= Rainer Werner Fassbinder filmography =

Rainer Werner Fassbinder (31 May 1945 – 10 June 1982) was a German filmmaker.

== Short films ==
| Year | English title | Original title | Role | Notes |
|---|---|---|---|---|
| 1965 | This Night | This Night | | Lost |
| 1966 | The City Tramp | Der Stadtstreicher | Mann auf toiletten | Uncredited |
| 1967 | The Little Chaos | Das kleine Chaos | Franz | |
| 1978 | Germany in Autumn | Deutschland im Herbst | | Segment of omnibus film |

== Feature films ==
| Year | English title | Original title | Notes |
|---|---|---|---|
| 1969 | Love Is Colder Than Death | Liebe ist kälter als der Tod | |
| 1969 | Katzelmacher | Katzelmacher | |
| 1970 | Why Does Herr R. Run Amok? | Warum läuft Herr R. Amok? | According to Hanna Schygulla, Fassbinder had no part in the making in this; it was realized from his idea by Michael Fengler, his assistant. |
| 1970 | The American Soldier | Der amerikanische Soldat | |
| 1971 | Whity | Whity | |
| 1971 | Beware of a Holy Whore | Warnung vor einer heiligen Nutte | |
| 1972 | The Merchant of Four Seasons | Händler der vier Jahreszeiten | |
| 1972 | The Bitter Tears of Petra von Kant | Die bitteren Tränen der Petra von Kant | |
| 1974 | Ali: Fear Eats the Soul | Angst essen Seele auf | |
| 1974 | Effi Briest | Fontane – Effi Briest oder: Viele, die eine Ahnung haben von ihren Möglichkeiten und Bedürfnissen und dennoch das herrschende System in ihrem Kopf akzeptieren durch ihre Taten und es somit festigen und durchaus bestätigen | |
| 1975 | Fox and His Friends | Faustrecht der Freiheit | Co-written with Christian Hohoff |
| 1975 | Mother Küsters' Trip to Heaven | Mutter Küsters Fahrt zum Himmel | Co-written with Kurt Raab |
| 1976 | Satan's Brew | Satansbraten | |
| 1976 | Chinese Roulette | Chinesisches Roulette | |
| 1978 | Despair | Despair – Eine Reise ins Licht | |
| 1978 | In a Year of 13 Moons | In einem Jahr mit 13 Monden | |
| 1979 | The Marriage of Maria Braun | Die Ehe der Maria Braun | Co-written with Pea Fröhlich and Peter Märthesheimer |
| 1979 | The Third Generation | Die dritte Generation | |
| 1981 | Lili Marleen | Lili Marleen | Co-written with Manfred Purzer and Joshua Sinclair |
| 1981 | Theater in Trance | Theater in Trance | Documentary |
| 1981 | Lola | Lola | Co-written with Pea Fröhlich and Peter Märthesheimer |
| 1982 | Veronika Voss | Die Sehnsucht der Veronika Voss | Co-written with Pea Fröhlich and Peter Märthesheimer |
| 1982 | Querelle | Querelle | Co-written with Burkhard Driest |

=== Acting roles ===
| Year | English title | Role | Notes |
|---|---|---|---|
| 1968 | With Oak Leaves and Fig Leaf | Festnehmender Soldat | |
| 1969 | Love Is Colder Than Death | Franz Walsch | Uncredited |
| 1969 | Katzelmacher | Jorgos | Uncredited |
| 1970 | Gods of the Plague | Pornokunde | Uncredited |
| 1970 | The American Soldier | Franz Walsch | Uncredited |
| 1971 | Mathias Kneissl | Flecklbauer | |
| 1971 | Whity | Saloon guest | Uncredited |
| 1971 | Beware of a Holy Whore | Sascha, Herstellungsleiter | |
| 1972 | The Merchant of Four Seasons | Zucker / Hans's friend | Uncredited |
| 1973 | The Tenderness of Wolves | Wittowski | |
| 1974 | Ali: Fear Eats the Soul | Eugen, Krista's husband | Uncredited |
| 1974 | Effi Briest | Narrator | Uncredited |
| 1975 | Fox and His Friends | Franz Biberkopf | |
| 1976 | Shadow of Angels | Raoul | |
| 1977 | Adolfo & Marlene | Hermann | |
| 1978 | Der kleine Godard an das Kuratorium junger deutscher Film | 2nd Director | |
| 1979 | The Third Generation | Peddler | |
| 1981 | Lili Marleen | Günther Weissenborn | Uncredited |
| 1981 | Heute spielen wir den Boß | Man | Uncredited |
| 1982 | Veronika Voss | Kinobesucher | Uncredited |
| 1982 | Kamikaze 1989 | Polizeileutnant Jansen | |
| 1983 | Die Erbtöchter | | Segment "Flüchtige Umarmungen" |

== Television films and miniseries ==
| Year | English title | Original title | Notes |
|---|---|---|---|
| 1970 | The Coffee Shop | Das Kaffeehaus | |
| 1970 | The Niklashausen Journey | Die Niklashauser Fahrt | Co-directed with Michael Fengler |
| 1970 | Baal | Baal | |
| 1971 | Rio das Mortes | Rio das Mortes | |
| 1971 | Pioneers in Ingolstadt | Pioniere in Ingolstadt | |
| 1972–73 | Eight Hours Don't Make a Day | Acht Stunden sind kein Tag | 5 episodes |
| 1972 | Bremen Freedom | Bremer Freiheit | |
| 1972 | Jail Bait | Wildwechsel | |
| 1973 | World on a Wire | Welt am Draht | 2 episodes |
| 1974 | Nora Helmer | Nora Helmer | |
| 1974 | Martha | Martha | |
| 1975 | Like a Bird on a Wire | Wie ein Vogel auf dem Draht | Co-written with Christian Hohoff and Anja Hauptmann |
| 1975 | Fear of Fear | Angst vor der Angst | |
| 1976 | I Only Want You To Love Me | Ich will doch nur, daß ihr mich liebt | |
| 1977 | Women in New York | Frauen in New York | |
| 1977 | The Stationmaster's Wife | Bolwieser | |
| 1980 | Berlin Alexanderplatz | Berlin Alexanderplatz | 14 episodes |

=== Acting roles ===
| Year | English title | Role | Notes |
|---|---|---|---|
| 1970 | The Niklashausen Journey | Black Monk | |
| 1970 | Baal | Baal | |
| 1971 | Rio das Mortes | Hannas Tanzpartner | |
| 1972 | Bremen Freedom | Rumpf | |
| 1980 | Berlin Alexanderplatz | Erzähler | |

== Films about Fassbinder ==
- Rainer Werner Fassbinder (1977) – German documentary made by Florian Hopf and Maximiliane Mainka. (29 minutes)
- Life Stories: A Conversation with RWF (German title: Lebensläufe – Rainer Werner Fassbinder im Gespräch, 1978) – German TV documentary made by Peter W. Jansen as part of a regular series. Contains an in-depth interview given by RWF in his Paris home. Originally aired on 18 March 1978. (48 minutes)
- RWF Last Works (German title: RWF Letzte Arbeiten, 1982) – German TV documentary made by Wolf Gremm during the shooting of Kamikaze 1989 and Querelle.
- Room 666 (German title: Chambre 666, 1982) – Along with a number of his peers, Fassbinder participated in this Wim Wenders documentary project. (50 minutes)
- A Man Like E.V.A. (German title: Ein Mann wie E.V.A., 1984) – Eva Mattes plays a fictionalized version of Fassbinder in this film directed by Radu Gabrea.(92 minutes)
- I Don't Just Want You to Love Me (1992) – German feature-length documentary on Fassbinder's career. (90 minutes)
- The Women of Fassbinder (German title: Frauen über R. W. Fassbinder 1992) – German television documentary made by Thomas Honickel. Margit Carstensen, Irm Hermann, Hanna Schygulla and (briefly) Rosel Zech are interviewed. (60 minutes)
- The Many Women of Fassbinder (1997)
- Life, Love and Celluloid (1998) – English language documentary film by Juliane Lorenz centring on the 1997 Museum of Modern Art retrospective in New York. Gottfried John and Günter Lamprecht are featured. (90 minutes)
- Fassbinder in Hollywood (2002) – Documentary made by Robert Fischer (mainly in English) and co-written by Ulli Lommel, who also appears. Michael Ballhaus, Hanna Schygulla and Wim Wenders are interviewed. (57 minutes)
- Fassbinder's Women (2005) – French thematic anthology of film clips. (25 minutes)
- Enfant Terrible, 2020 film directed by Oskar Roehler
