= Fassbinder's Women =

- Theatrical release poster
- Directed by: Rosa von Praunheim
- Written by: Rosa von Praunheim
- Produced by: Gerold Hofmann; Holger Prebe
- Starring: Brigitte Mira; Irm Hermann; Hanna Schygulla; Barbara Valentin; Ingrid Caven; Jeanne Moreau; Michael Ballhaus; Harry Baer
- Cinematography: Elfi Mikesch
- Edited by: Mike Shepard
- Music by: Peer Raben
- Production company: ZDF / ARTE
- Release date: 10 November 2000
- Running time: 90 minutes
- Country: Germany
- Language: German
- Box office: $160,854 (USA)

Fassbinder's Women (German: Für mich gab's nur noch Fassbinder) is a 2000 German documentary film directed by Rosa von Praunheim. The film was shown at the Locarno Festival in 2000 and at the Outfest in Los Angeles in 2001.

== Plot ==
The film consists of several interviews with men and women from the private and professional environment of the German film director Rainer Werner Fassbinder. Rosa von Praunheim gets to the bottom of her relationship with the director, who is said to have been a difficult and eccentric man who never went easy on his actors and often treated them badly. Fassbinder's companions usually had an ambivalent relationship with him, since they admired him on the other hand and often had him to thank for their success.

== Reception ==
"As in many of his films, Praunheim's documentary gaze exposes the cliché and thus makes it possible to see the 'Fassbinder phenomenon' in a new way. Praunheim's examination of Fassbinder thus becomes an important piece of German film history." (Prisma Magazin)
