= Armin Meier (actor) =

German actor (1943–1978)

Armin Meier (1943 – 31 May 1978) was a German actor, best known for his performances in films of Rainer Werner Fassbinder.

According to the documentary film Fassbinder: To Love Without Demands (2015) directed by Christian Braad Thomsen, Meier was one of Fassbinder's many lovers. He killed himself hours after Fassbinder's 33rd birthday party. Meier's body later was found in Fassbinder's apartment.

== Filmography ==
Year	Title	Role	Notes
1975	Mother Küsters' Trip to Heaven	Ernst	
1975	Fear of Fear	Karli	TV movie
1976	I Only Want You To Love Me	Polier	TV movie
1976	Satan's Brew	Stricher	
1976	Chinese Roulette	Man at service station	uncredited
1977	Petty Thieves		
1977	Adolf and Marlene		
1977	The Stationmaster's Wife	Scherber	TV movie
1978	Flaming Hearts	Fahrer	
1978	Despair	Silverman/Sergeant Brown/Foreman	
1978	Game of Losers	Charly	
1978	Germany in Autumn	himself	documentary
2015	Fassbinder: To Love Without Demands	himself	(archive footage)
