= Alexander Allerson =

German film and television actor (born 1930)

- Born: 19 May 1930 (age 96); Osterode, East Prussia, Prussia, Germany
- Occupation: Actor
- Years active: 1961–1997

Alexander Allerson (born 19 May 1930) is a German film and television actor.

== Partial filmography ==
- Man and Beast (1963), as SS-Man Goldap
- Encounter in Salzburg (1964), as Mahlke
- The Upper Hand (1966)
- The Trap Snaps Shut at Midnight (1966), as Husky
- The Alley Cats (1966)
- I Deal in Danger (1966), as Draus
- The Death of a Double (1967), as Joe
- Vengeance (1968)
- Assignment K (1968)
- The Duck Rings at Half Past Seven (1968)
- Battle of Britain (1969), as Major Brandt
- The McKenzie Break (1970), as Lieutenant Wolff
- Slaughterhouse-Five (1972)
- Tears of Blood (1972)
- Temptation in the Summer Wind (1972)
- ... All the Way, Boys! (1973), as Saluds brother
- Ludwig (1973), as Secretary of State
- My Name Is Nobody (1973), as Rex
- Who? (1974), as Dr. Korthu
- The Odessa File (1974), as Dr. Ratinger
- The Secret Carrier (1975)
- I Only Want You to Love Me (1976), as Peter’s father
- Satan's Brew (1976), as Publisher
- Chinese Roulette (1976), as Gerhard Christ
- Shadow of Angels (1976), as Hans von Gluck
- Despair (1978), as Mayer
- Lili Marleen (1981), as Goedecke

== Voice filmography ==
- 1994: Asterix Conquers America as Senator (uncredited) (German Dub)

== Bibliography ==
- Wallace Steadman Watson. Understanding Rainer Werner Fassbinder: Film as Private and Public Art. Univ of South Carolina Press, 1996.
