= Michael Ballhaus =

German cinematographer (1935–2017)

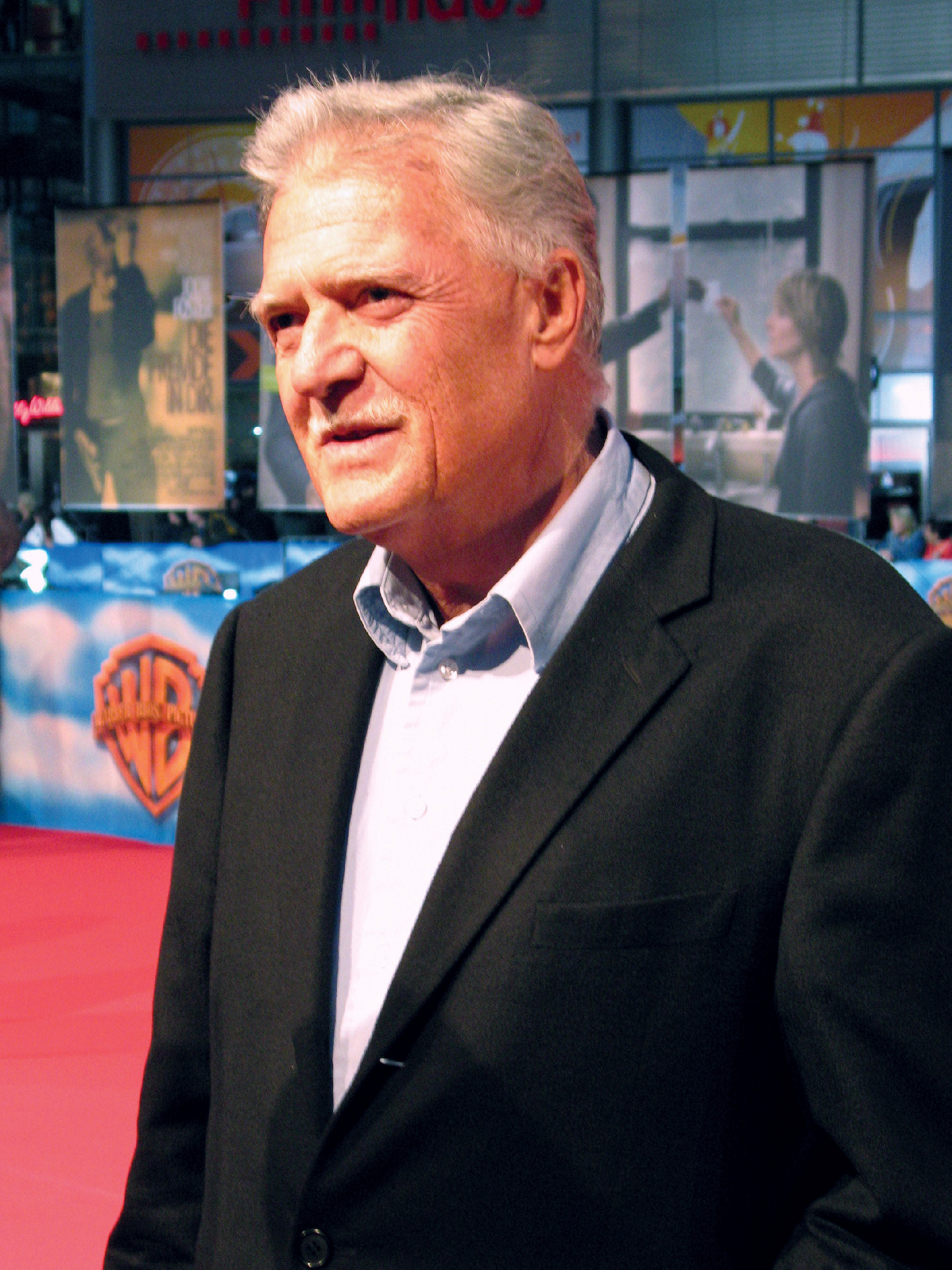
- Ballhaus in 2007
- Born: 5 August 1935; Berlin, Nazi Germany
- Died: 12 April 2017 (aged 81); Berlin, Germany
- Occupations: Cinematographer, film director, producer, screenwriter, editor
- Years active: 1959–2013
- Spouses: Helga Betten (m. 1958; died 2006) Sherry Hormann (m. 2011)
- Children: 2, including Florian
- Parent(s): Oskar Ballhaus; Lena Hutter
- Relatives: Carl Balhaus (uncle)
- Awards: See below

Michael Ballhaus, ASC (5 August 1935 – 12 April 2017) was a German cinematographer and filmmaker, known for his collaborations with directors Rainer Werner Fassbinder, Martin Scorsese, Mike Nichols, and James L. Brooks. He was nominated three times each for the Academy Award and BAFTA Award for Best Cinematography, and won two German Film Awards.

== Early life ==
Ballhaus was born on 5 August 1935 in Berlin, to actors Lena Hutter and Oskar Ballhaus. His uncle was actor and director Carl Ballhaus.

He was influenced by family friend Max Ophüls, and appeared as an extra in Ophüls' last film Lola Montès (1955).

== Career ==
Ballhaus came to prominence with his work with Rainer Werner Fassbinder beginning with Whity (1971), in addition to The Bitter Tears of Petra von Kant (1972), Chinese Roulette (1976) and The Marriage of Maria Braun (1978). In 1990, he was the head of the jury at the 40th Berlin International Film Festival.

After settling in the United States, he worked on many American films, such as Goodfellas (1990), Bram Stoker's Dracula (1992), Wild Wild West (1999) and Gangs of New York (2002).

Ballhaus also made an appearance in Rosa von Praunheim's film Fassbinder's Women (2000).

He was nominated three times for the Academy Award for Best Cinematography, but never won. He did win awards at the Chicago Film Critics Association, the Boston Society of Film Critics, and twice at the Los Angeles Film Critics Association.

His documentary In Berlin, made with Ciro Cappellari, was released in May 2009.

Ballhaus's final film was Sherry Hormann's 3096 Days in 2013.

In 1993, Ballhaus joined the Academy of Arts, Berlin. He was also a member of the Freie Akademie der Künste Hamburg, and was a co-founding member of the Deutsche Filmakademie in 2003.

== Personal life ==
Ballhaus was married to actress and art director Helga Maria Betten from 1958 until her death in 2006. They had two sons, Florian, who is also a cinematographer, and Jan Sebastian, an assistant director.

In 2011, Ballhaus married German-American director Sherry Hormann.

=== Death ===
Ballhaus died at his home in Berlin at the age of 81 on 12 April 2017, after a short illness.

== Filmography ==
=== Feature film ===
Cinematographer

Year	Title	Director	Notes
1969	Mehrmals täglich	Ralf Gregan	
1969	Your Caresses	Peter Schamoni; Herbert Vesely	
1970	We Two	Ulrich Schamoni	
1971	Whity	Rainer Werner Fassbinder	
1971	Beware of a Holy Whore	Rainer Werner Fassbinder	
1972	The Bitter Tears of Petra von Kant	Rainer Werner Fassbinder	
1972	Tödlicher Poker	Ulli Lommel	
1973	Tschetan, der Indianerjunge	Hark Bohm	
1973	Das sündige Bett	Ralf Gregan	Credited as "Michael Alexander"
1974	Made in Germany und USA	Rudolf Thome	With Martin Schäfer
1975	Fox and His Friends	Rainer Werner Fassbinder	
1975	Mother Küsters' Trip to Heaven	Rainer Werner Fassbinder	
1975	Das Amulett des Todes	Ralf Gregan; Günter Vaessen	
1976	Summerfolk	Peter Stein	
1976	Satan's Brew	Rainer Werner Fassbinder	With Jürgen Jürges
1976	Chinese Roulette	Rainer Werner Fassbinder	
1977	Adolf und Marlene	Ulli Lommel	
1978	Despair	Rainer Werner Fassbinder	
1979	The Marriage of Maria Braun	Rainer Werner Fassbinder	
1979	The First Polka	Klaus Emmerich	
1980	Der Aufstand	Peter Lilienthal	
1980	Big and Little	Peter Stein	
1981	Lili Marleen	Rainer Werner Fassbinder	Uncredited
1981	Malou	Jeanine Meerapfel	
1981	Looping	Walter Bockmayer; Rolf Bührmann	With Horst Knechtel
1981	Heute spielen wir den Boß	Peer Raben	
1982	The Magic Mountain	Hans W. Geißendörfer	
1982	Dear Mr. Wonderful	Peter Lilienthal	
1983	Sheer Madness	Margarethe von Trotta	
1983	Baby It's You	John Sayles	
1983	Edith's Diary	Hans W. Geißendörfer	
1984	Old Enough	Marisa Silver	
1984	Reckless	James Foley	
1984	Das Autogramm	Peter Lilienthal	
1984	Heartbreakers	Bobby Roth	
1985	After Hours	Martin Scorsese	
1986	Under the Cherry Moon	Prince	
1986	The Color of Money	Martin Scorsese	
1987	The Glass Menagerie	Paul Newman	
1987	Broadcast News	James L. Brooks	
1988	The House on Carroll Street	Peter Yates	
1988	The Last Temptation of Christ	Martin Scorsese	
1988	Dirty Rotten Scoundrels	Frank Oz	
1988	Working Girl	Mike Nichols	
1989	The Fabulous Baker Boys	Steve Kloves	
1990	Goodfellas	Martin Scorsese	
1990	Postcards from the Edge	Mike Nichols	
1991	Guilty by Suspicion	Irwin Winkler	
1991	What About Bob?	Frank Oz	
1992	The Mambo Kings	Arne Glimcher	
1992	Bram Stoker's Dracula	Francis Ford Coppola	
1993	The Age of Innocence	Martin Scorsese	
1994	I'll Do Anything	James L. Brooks	
1994	Quiz Show	Robert Redford	
1995	Outbreak	Wolfgang Petersen	
1996	Sleepers	Barry Levinson	
1997	Air Force One	Wolfgang Petersen	
1998	Primary Colors	Mike Nichols	
1999	Wild Wild West	Barry Sonnenfeld	
2000	What Planet Are You From?	Mike Nichols	
2000	The Legend of Bagger Vance	Robert Redford	
2002	Gangs of New York	Martin Scorsese	
2003	Uptown Girls	Boaz Yakin	
2003	Something's Gotta Give	Nancy Meyers	
2005	Sonntagsluft	Frank A. Buecheler	
2006	The Departed	Martin Scorsese	
2013	3096 Days	Sherry Hormann	

Executive producer

- The Thirteenth Floor (1999)

Associate producer

- Remembrance (2011)

=== Short film ===
Cinematographer

Year	Title	Director	Notes
1978	Teile I	Valie Export	Segment of I (Beat (It))
1979	Bourbon Street Blues	Hans Schönherr; Tilman Taube	
2001	Gone Underground	Su Turhan	
2002	Mutti	Su Turhan	
2007	Die sanfte Schminke des Lichts	Alexander Kluge	
2007	Nachts träumen die Lampen des Ateliers von ihrem wahren Leben	Alexander Kluge	
2009	Purple Sunrise	Nina Vukovic	With Armin Dierolf
2013	First Fassbinder	Matthew Cheney	

Producer

- Last Night (2004)

=== Television ===
Cinematographer

Year	Title	Director	Notes
1958–70	Sie schreiben mit		
1960	Die Nachbarskinder	Peter Lilienthal	
1961	Die Kassette	Rudolf Noelte	
1963	Der Klassenaufsatz	Harald Benesch	
1964	Die Wohnung	Harald Benesch	
1964	Das Martyrium des Peter O'Hey	Peter Lilienthal	
1965	Der große Wildenberg – Ein Feuilleton	Herbert Vesely	
1966	Ein Haus aus lauter Liebe	Herbert Vesely	
1966	Große Liebe	Johannes Schaaf	
1966	Abschied	Peter Lilienthal	
1968	Ganze Tage in den Bäumen	Tom Toelle	
1968	Gold für Montevasall	Thomas Engel	
1969	Der Kidnapper	Tom Toelle	
1971	Sand	Peter Palitzsch	
1972	Der Marquis von Keith	Hans Lietzau	
1972	Der Held	Hagen Müller-Stahl	
1972	Adele Spitzeder	Peer Raben	
1973	World on a Wire	Rainer Werner Fassbinder	Miniseries
1973	Tatort	Wolfgang Staudte	Episode "Tote brauchen keine Wohnung"
1974	Martha	Rainer Werner Fassbinder	
1974	Rosenmontag	Peter Beauvais	
1974	Ein Haus für uns	Wim Wenders	Episodes "Aus der Familie der Panzerechsen" and "Die Insel"
1974–76	Unter einem Dach		
1976	Die Wahl	Rainer Boldt	
1976	I Only Want You to Love Me	Rainer Werner Fassbinder	With Ernst Schmid
1976	Dorothea Merz	Peter Beauvais	
1976	Sonntag	Niels-Peter Rudolph	
1977	Auf dem Chimborazo	Peter Beauvais	
1977	Frauen in New York	Rainer Werner Fassbinder	
1977	The Stationmaster's Wife	Rainer Werner Fassbinder	
1977	Also es war so...	Karin Thome	with Lothar E. Stickelbrucks
1978	Der Gehilfe	Ludwig Cremer	
1979	Trilogie des Wiedersehens	Botho Strauß	
1979	Die Alpensaga	Dieter Berner	Episode "Der deutsche Frühling"
1980	Weihnacht '80 – Drei geschichten	Wilhelm Pevny; Dieter Berner	Segments "Das Menschenkindl" and "Maria und Josef"
1982	Der Auslöser	Maria Neocleous	
1985	Death of a Salesman	Volker Schlöndorff	
1986	Landscape with Waitress	Jeffrey Townsend	
1988	Baja Oklahoma	Bobby Roth	

=== Documentary works ===
Cinematographer

Year	Title	Director	Notes
1961	Traumland der Sehnsucht	Wolfgang Müller-Sehn	With Wolfgang Müller-Sehn
1971	Berlin – Anhalter Bahnhof – XXV Jahre danach	Leonid Wawiloff	
1973	Ich bin ein Bürger der DDR	Erika Runge	
1977	Nur zum Spaß, nur zum Spiel	Volker Schlöndorff	
1977	Curd Jürgens	Bernhard Wicki	With Xaver Schwarzenberger
1978	Germany in Autumn	Rainer Werner Fassbinder	
1978	Venedig – Die Insel der Glückseligen am Rande des Untergangs	Christian Rischert	
1981	Oye Raimundo, adónde vas?	Jaime Carrasco; Francisco Chavez; Luis Lupone; Jesús Sánchez	

Director

Year	Title	Notes
1971	Die Verabredung mit der Wirklichkeit	
1971	Fassbinder produziert: Film Nr. 8	With Dietmar Buchmann
2009	In Berlin	Also writer and editor
2011	Unser Franken	With Ulla Ballhaus

== Awards and nominations ==
Michael Ballhaus awards and nominations
Award	Wins	Nominations
Academy Awards	N/A	3
BAFTA Film Awards	N/A	3
German Film Award	3	N/A
Independent Spirit Awards	N/A	1

=== Academy Awards ===
Year	Category	Title	Result
1988	Best Cinematography	Broadcast News	Nominated
1990	Best Cinematography	The Fabulous Baker Boys	Nominated
2003	Best Cinematography	Gangs of New York	Nominated

=== British Academy Film Awards ===
Year	Category	Title	Result
1991	Best Cinematography	Goodfellas	Nominated
1994	Best Cinematography	The Age of Innocence	Nominated
2003	Best Cinematography	Gangs of New York	Nominated

=== German Film Awards ===
Year	Category	Title	Result
1973	Best Cinematography	The Bitter Tears of Petra von Kant	Won
1978	Best Cinematography	Despair	Won
2012	Honorary Award	—N/a	Won

=== Independent Spirit Awards ===
Year	Category	Title	Result
1986	Best Cinematography	After Hours	Nominated

=== Critics awards ===
Institution	Year	Category	Title	Result
Boston Society of Film Critics	1989	Best Cinematography	The Fabulous Baker Boys	Won
Chicago Film Critics Association	1992	Best Cinematography	Bram Stoker's Dracula	Won
Chicago Film Critics Association	2002	Best Cinematography	Gangs of New York	Nominated
Chicago Film Critics Association	2006	Best Cinematography	The Departed	Nominated
Los Angeles Film Critics Association	1989	Best Cinematography	The Fabulous Baker Boys	Won
Los Angeles Film Critics Association	1990	Best Cinematography	Goodfellas	Won
National Society of Film Critics	1986	Best Cinematography	After Hours	Nominated
National Society of Film Critics	1989	Best Cinematography	The Fabulous Baker Boys	Won
National Society of Film Critics	1994	Best Cinematography	The Age of Innocence	Nominated
New York Film Critics Circle	1989	Best Cinematographer	The Fabulous Baker Boys	2nd place
New York Film Critics Circle	1990	Best Cinematographer	Goodfellas	Nominated
New York Film Critics Circle	1993	Best Cinematographer	The Age of Innocence	Nominated
New York Film Critics Circle	2002	Best Cinematographer	Gangs of New York	Nominated
Seattle Film Critics Society	2002	Best Cinematography	Gangs of New York	Nominated
St. Louis Film Critics Association	2006	Best Cinematography	The Departed	Nominated

=== Film festivals ===
Institution	Year	Category	Title	Result
Berlin International Film Festival	2006	Berlinale Camera	—N/a	Won
Berlin International Film Festival	2016	Honorary Golden Bear	—N/a	Won
Camerimage	1993	Golden Frog	The Age of Innocence	Nominated
Camerimage	2006	Golden Frog	The Departed	Nominated
Camerimage	2010	Lifetime Achievement Award	—N/a	Won
Manaki Brothers Film Festival	2006	Golden Camera 300	—N/a	Won
Shanghai International Film Festival	2001	Best Technology	The Legend of Bagger Vance	Won

=== Other accolades ===
Institution	Year	Category	Title	Result
American Society of Cinematographers	2003	Outstanding Achievement in Cinematography in Theatrical Releases	Gangs of New York	Nominated
American Society of Cinematographers	2007	International Award	—N/a	Won
Bambi Awards	2009	Honorary Award	—N/a	Won
Bavarian Film Awards	2007	Honorary Award	—N/a	Won
British Society of Cinematographers	1990	Best Cinematography in a Theatrical Feature Film	Goodfellas	Nominated
European Film Awards	2007	Outstanding Achievement in World Cinema	—N/a	Won
Goldene Kamera	1996	Honorary Award	—N/a	Won
MTV Video Music Awards	1987	Best Cinematography	Papa Don't Preach	Nominated
Raymond Loewy Foundation	2001	Lucky Strike Designer Award	—N/a	Won
Romy Award	2013	Best Cinematography	3096 Days	Won
Satellite Awards	2000	Best Cinematography	The Legend of Bagger Vance	Nominated
Satellite Awards	2002	Best Cinematography	Gangs of New York	Nominated

== See also ==
- List of German-speaking Academy Award winners and nominees
