= Annemarie Wendl =

German actress (1914–2006)

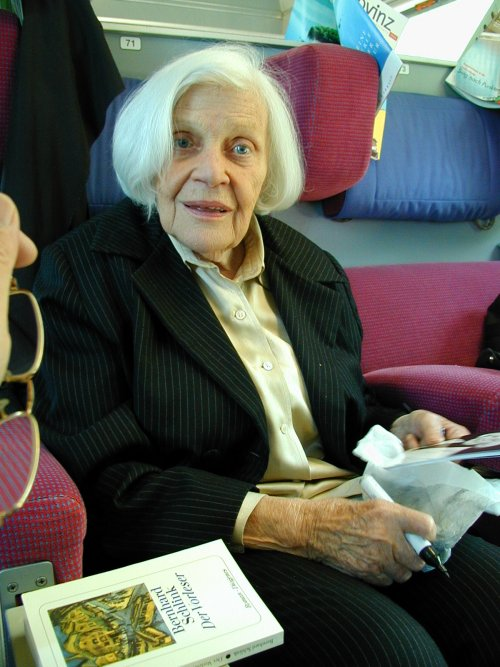
Annemarie Wendl

Annemarie Wendl (26 December 1914 – 3 September 2006) was a German actress.

== Early life and education ==
Annemarie Wendl's birthday was initially given as 26 December 1921 or 1922 on the Lindenstraße homepage, until she turned 90 in 2004. An official correction was published, revealing that Wendl was somewhat older than her character (Else Kling was born on 14 May 1922, and died on 25 May 2006 at the age of 84).

Wendl was born into an upper-class family in Bavaria and began her training as an actress in Berlin at Lucie Höflich's seminar.

== Career ==
Wendl played classical roles on stage in Berlin, Bonn, Augsburg, Innsbruck, Munich, Meiningen, Bamberg, and Ingolstadt. In her youth, she played "all sentimental characters", such as Faust's Gretchen and Emilia Galotti. Later she played character roles, such as Adelheid in Götz von Berlichingen, Blanche DuBois in A Streetcar Named Desire, Maria Stuart in the play by Schiller and the title role in Brecht's Mother Courage. Her last theatrical works were The Widow in the Green Tree (1997) and Sanssouci in 2001.

Wendl began working in film in 1961 and made more than 35 films and TV productions.

During her long career on the big screen, Wendl was seen in some of Rainer Werner Fassbinder's films (including I Only Want You To Love Me, 1976). Her television work includes series like Die fünfte Kolonne, Meister Eder und sein Pumuckl and Der Kommissar, where she made guest appearances in a few episodes.

Wendl was best known for her role as "Else Kling" in the German weekly soap opera Lindenstraße, which started in December 1985. She appeared in the first episode Herzlich Willkommen and remained in the series' cast until May 2006. Her character, Else Kling, lost her husband, Egon Kling, in a car accident in Paris, France, in 1998. Kling died in the episode "Abschied und Ankunft" (#1069).

== Later life and death ==
In 2005, Wendl suffered a stroke and had three bouts of pneumonia, which caused her to cease work on Lindenstraße. After her character's death, Wendl received coverage in the yellow press quite regularly, most notably about her health.

Wendl, who was married to Siegmar Kleinschmidt from 1942 until his death in 1944, lived in Munich and died at age 91 on 5 September 2006. She was survived by her son.
