= Brigitte Mira =

German actress

- Born: 20 April 1910; Hamburg, German Empire
- Died: 8 March 2005 (aged 94); Berlin, Germany
- Occupation: Actress

Brigitte Mira (German: [bʁiˈɡɪ.tə ˈmi.ʁaː̯], 20 April 1910 – 8 March 2005) was a German actress. She worked in both theater and film, and on many occasions, with Rainer Werner Fassbinder.

Believed to have been born in Hamburg, she moved when young to Berlin. Mira's mother was German, and her father was Russian Jewish. During the Nazi era, Mira took part in the propaganda series Liese und Miese. She played Miese (germ. bad one): the bad role model, according to Nazi ideology, who listened to enemy radio stations and stockpiled rationed food. However, her acting skills turned the "bad" character she portrayed into a likeable one. The series was cancelled for being counterproductive. The propaganda directors did not know that Mira was half-Jewish because she had false papers. Although she insisted on her naivete as a young woman and that she had to conceal her origins, she was criticized later by some for taking part in these ads at all.

Notable performances include Emmi Kurowski in Ali: Fear Eats the Soul (1974), a role for which she won a German Film Award. In the 1980s, Mira achieved another big success with the television series Drei Damen vom Grill. She appeared in the 1991 stage production of Stephen Sondheim's Follies in Berlin.

== Partial filmography ==
- The Berliner (1948) as Dirne
- Und abends in die Scala (1958) as Frau Mertens
- Münchhausen in Afrika (1958, voice) as Karla Mai
- When She Starts, Look Out (1958) as Frau Knax
- The Star of Santa Clara (1958) as Tante Theresa
- So ein Millionär hat's schwer (1958) as Madame Pillard
- Schlag auf Schlag (1959) as Sophie Hinze
- Melodie und Rhythmus (1959) as Pensionsleiterin
- Du bist wunderbar (1959) as Madame Dupont
- Im Namen einer Mutter (1960) as Mutter Reitner, Strafgefangene
- Geschminkte Jugend (1960)
- Ich kann nicht länger schweigen (1962) as Frau Ohl
- So toll wie anno dazumal (1962) as Frau Sommer
- Jack and Jenny (1963) as Thea
- Der Partyphotograph (1968) as Frau Bütow
- Hotel by the Hour (1970) as Rose Schuh
- Twenty Girls and the Teachers (1971) as Wirtin
- Wir hau'n den Hauswirt in die Pfanne (1971) as Mutti Bauer
- Eight Hours Don't Make a Day (1973, TV series, directed by Rainer Werner Fassbinder) as Marions Mutter, Frau Andreas
- The Tenderness of Wolves (1973, directed by Ulli Lommel) as Louise Engel
- 1 Berlin-Harlem (1974)
- Ali: Fear Eats the Soul (1974, directed by Rainer Werner Fassbinder) as Emmi
- The Enigma of Kaspar Hauser (1974, directed by Werner Herzog) as Kathe, Servant
- Fox and His Friends (1975, directed by Rainer Werner Fassbinder) as Shopkeeper #2
- Mother Küsters Goes to Heaven (1975, directed by Rainer Werner Fassbinder) as Emma Küsters
- Fear of Fear (1975, TV film, directed by Rainer Werner Fassbinder) as Mutter
- The Secret Carrier (1975)
- Everyone Dies Alone (1976) as Frau Häberle
- Anita Drögemöller und die Ruhe an der Ruhr (1976) as Oma Wuttke
- Satan's Brew (1976, directed by Rainer Werner Fassbinder) as Mutter Kranz
- Chinese Roulette (1976, directed by Rainer Werner Fassbinder) as Kast
- Adolf & Marlene (1977)
- Liebe das Leben, lebe das Lieben (1977) as Hauswartfrau
- Drei Damen vom Grill (1977–1992, TV series, 140 episodes) as Margarete Färber
- The Woman Across the Way (1978) as Simons Mutter
- Iron Gustav (1979, TV miniseries) as Frau Pauli
- Derrick (1979, Season 6, Episode 12: "Ein Todesengel") as Frau Tobbe
- Primel macht ihr Haus verrückt (1980) as Frau Kulicke
- Fabian (1980) as Frau Hohlfeld
- Berlin Alexanderplatz (1980, TV miniseries) as Frau Bast / Wirtin Bast
- Lili Marleen (1981, directed by Rainer Werner Fassbinder) as Nachbarin
- After Midnight (1981) as Denunziantin
- Kamikaze 1989 (1982) as Personaldirektorin
- The Roaring Fifties (1983) as Frau Willmsen
- Siggi, the Street Cleaner (1984) as Frau Niendorf
- Girl in a Boot (1985) as Toilettenfrau
- Schwarzer Lohn und weiße Weste (1985) as Gemüsefrau
- Spreepiraten (1989–1990, TV series, 21 episodes) as Gundula Brachvogel
- Fassbinder's Women (2000, documentary by Rosa von Praunheim) as Herself

== Dubbing roles ==
- Widow Tweed - Disney's The Fox and the Hound (1981)
