= Why Does Herr R. Run Amok? =

1969 film

- Film poster
- Directed by: Michael Fengler; Rainer Werner Fassbinder
- Written by: Rainer Werner Fassbinder; Michael Fengler
- Produced by: Michael Fengler
- Starring: Lilith Ungerer
- Cinematography: Dietrich Lohmann
- Edited by: Rainer Werner Fassbinder; Michael Fengler
- Release date: 28 June 1970
- Running time: 90 minutes
- Country: West Germany
- Language: German

Why Does Herr R. Run Amok? (German: Warum läuft Herr R. Amok?) is a 1970 West German drama film directed by Michael Fengler and Rainer Werner Fassbinder. It was entered into the 20th Berlin International Film Festival.

== Plot ==
Herr Rabb has worked for 18 months at a small architectural firm and displays loyalty and respect for his colleagues. He and his wife harmoniously attend a parent-teacher conference, watch television and plan for the future. They visit his parents, where his mother seems slightly overbearing. He was rebuked at work and his son could be doing better at school, but these do not seem to be serious issues. His wife tells friends that he is anticipating promotion to another office. Rabb is at work, getting his health check-up with few issues apart from slightly raised blood pressure and persistent headaches, and later making an embarrassingly tipsy speech at a dinner-party for his colleagues and boss, after which his wife calls him fat and stupid. Herr R. watches television with his wife and a talkative neighbor. After listening to the neighbor talking about her skiing trip, Herr R. gets up and silently bludgeons to death the neighbor, his wife and son, Amadeus, with a large candlestick. The next day, he reports to work on time. When the police arrive, they find he has hanged himself in the bathroom.

== Cast ==
- Lilith Ungerer - Frau R.
- Kurt Raab - Herr R.
- Lilo Pempeit - Kollegin im Büro
- Franz Maron - Chef
- Harry Baer - Kollege im Büro
- Peter Moland - Kollege im Büro
- Hanna Schygulla - Schulfreundin von Frau R.
- Ingrid Caven - Nachbarin
- Irm Hermann - Nachbarin
- Doris Mattes - Nachbarin
- Hannes Gromball - Nachbar
- Vinzenz Sterr - Opa Raab (as Herr Sterr)
- Maria Sterr - Oma Raab (as Frau Sterr)
- Peer Raben - Schulfreund von Herrn R.
- Eva Pampuch - Schallplattenverkäuferin
- Carla Egerer - Schallplattenverkäuferin (as Carla Aulaulu)
