= Katzelmacher =

1969 film

- Theatrical release poster
- Directed by: Rainer Werner Fassbinder
- Written by: Rainer Werner Fassbinder
- Produced by: Peer Raben
- Starring: Hanna Schygulla; Lilith Ungerer; Rudolf Waldemar Brem; Elga Sorbas; Rainer Werner Fassbinder
- Cinematography: Dietrich Lohmann
- Music by: Peer Raben
- Release date: 8 October 1969 (West Germany)
- Running time: 88 minutes
- Country: West Germany
- Language: German
- Budget: ~ DEM 80,000

Katzelmacher is a 1969 West German film written and directed by Rainer Werner Fassbinder, based on his own play. The film centers on an aimless group of friends whose lives are shaken up by the arrival of an immigrant Greek worker, Jorgos (played by Fassbinder himself).

== Cast ==
- Hanna Schygulla: Marie
- Lilith Ungerer: Helga
- Rudolf Waldemar Brem: Paul
- Elga Sorbas: Rosy
- Doris Mattes: Gunda
- Irm Hermann: Elisabeth
- Peter Moland: Peter
- Hans Hirschmüller: Erich
- Rainer Werner Fassbinder: Jorgos
- Harry Baer: Franz
- Hannes Gromball: Klaus
- Katrin Schaake: Woman

== Reception ==
When the film was released in America in 1977, Vincent Canby in The New York Times called it "extraordinarily stylish... quite unlike anything else I've seen... an early glimpse of his [Fassbinder's] dazzling talent and the talents of the stock company of performers and technicians who, with him, have created a body of film work unique in any country in recent years".
