= The American Soldier =

1970 film

- Theatrical release poster
- Directed by: Rainer Werner Fassbinder
- Written by: Rainer Werner Fassbinder
- Produced by: Rainer Werner Fassbinder
- Starring: Karl Scheydt; Elga Sorbas; Jan George; Hark Bohm; Marius Aicher
- Cinematography: Dietrich Lohmann
- Edited by: Thea Eymesz
- Music by: Peer Raben
- Production company: Antiteater
- Release date: 9 October 1970 (International Filmfestival Mannheim-Heidelberg)
- Running time: 80 minutes
- Country: West Germany
- Language: German
- Budget: DEM 280,000 (estimated)

The American Soldier (German: Der amerikanische Soldat) is a 1970 West German film written and directed by Rainer Werner Fassbinder. The film stars Karl Scheydt.

== Plot ==
Ricky, a German-American Vietnam veteran, takes a job as a hired assassin on behalf of three renegade policemen to do away with a number of undesirables in Munich.

== Cast ==
- Karl Scheydt as Ricky
- Elga Sorbas as Rosa von Praunheim
- Jan George as Jan
- Hark Bohm as Doc
- Marius Aicher as Cop
- Margarethe von Trotta as Chambermaid
- Ulli Lommel as Gypsy
- Katrin Schaake as Magdalena Fuller
- Ingrid Caven as Bar Singer
- Eva Ingeborg Scholz as Ricky's mother
- Kurt Raab as Ricky's brother
- Irm Hermann as Whore
- Gustl Datz as Chief of police
- Rainer Werner Fassbinder as Franz Walsch
