= Whity =

1971 film

- DVD cover
- Directed by: Rainer Werner Fassbinder
- Written by: Rainer Werner Fassbinder
- Produced by: Peter Berling; Peer Raben; Ulli Lommel
- Starring: Günther Kaufmann; Hanna Schygulla
- Cinematography: Michael Ballhaus
- Edited by: Rainer Werner Fassbinder; Thea Eymèsz
- Music by: Peer Raben
- Release date: 2 June 1971 (Berlinale)
- Running time: 95 minutes
- Country: West Germany
- Languages: German; English

Whity is a 1971 West German film, written and directed by Rainer Werner Fassbinder and starring Günther Kaufmann and Hanna Schygulla. Shot in Spain, it is a melodrama in the form of a Spaghetti Western which addresses some of Fassbinder's recurrent themes such as dysfunctional families, sexual diversity and the struggle of the individual to find a place in society. Though entered into the 21st Berlin International Film Festival, it was never distributed theatrically and only much later achieved a DVD release.

== Plot ==
In 1878 in the south west of the US, Ben Nicholson is the richest rancher of the area. A tough man who strikes a hard bargain, he has been outwitted by his second wife Katherine, a flirtatious intriguer. Of his two sons from the previous marriage, Frank is gay and the unfortunate David is a half-wit. There is a third son in the house however, born from the black cook Marpessa, who acts as butler: this is Whity.

Despite his capability, Whity gets humiliated and whipped. His only hope of any decency lies in his friendship with the town's saloon singer and whore, Hanna. She has landed a job back in the east and offers to take Whity with her, but he says he must stay with his family.

To trap Katherine, Ben arranges for a Mexican called Garcia to pretend he is a physician and to seduce her, confiding to her that Ben has not long to live. The plot succeeds but, rather than pay what he promised, Ben kills Garcia. When he learns that Hanna witnessed the murder, he pays her for her silence.

Excited by the prospect of inheriting the ranch, both Frank and Katherine try to get Whity to kill Ben. In the end, after repeated humiliations in a household where everybody is trying to seduce or kill each other, Whity decides he must at last act. He shoots all four Nicholsons and flees into the desert with Hanna, whose money he had earlier stolen and gambled away. When they eventually run out of water, they dance together as the sun sets behind them.

== Cast ==
- Günther Kaufmann as Whity
- Hanna Schygulla as Hanna
- Katrin Schaake as Katherine Nicholson
- Harry Baer as Davy Nicholson
- Ulli Lommel as Frank Nicholson
- Tomas Blanco as Fake Mexican physician
- Stefano Capriati as Judge
- Elaine Baker as Marpessa, Whity's mother
- Mark Salvage as Sheriff
- Helga Ballhaus as Judge's wife
- Ron Randell as Benjamin Nicholson
