= Drei Damen vom Grill =

- Created by: Heinz Oskar Wuttig
- Starring: Brigitte Mira; Brigitte Grothum; Gabriele Schramm
- Country of origin: Germany

Original release
- Network: NDR Fernsehen
- Release: 16 October 1978 – 22 January 1992

Drei Damen vom Grill is a German television series that aired from 1978 to 1992 on Germany's public television station, ARD.

The series revolved around the Färber family (grandmother Margarete, mother Magda and daughter Margot Färber) who ran a snack bar in West Berlin. The show not only depicts their lives and work, but also reflects the division of Berlin and later the German Reunification.

== International Syndication ==
The series aired in several countries with the original German audio, but with English subtitles. It ran in Australia on SBS for many years under the title "Three Ladies and Their Hot Dog Stand." In France, it aired as "Les aventures de trois filles au grill" on FR3. It also ran in Portugal as "3 Garotas na Terra de Salsicha" on RTP2.

== Cast ==
- Brigitte Mira as Margarete Färber
- Brigitte Grothum as Magda Färber / Marion Mann
- Gabriele Schramm as Margot Färber
- Günter Pfitzmann as Otto Krüger
- Harald Juhnke as Ottmar Kinkel
