= I Only Want You to Love Me =

- Written by: Rainer Werner Fassbinder
- Directed by: Rainer Werner Fassbinder
- Starring: Vitus Zeplichal; Elke Aberle; Alexander Allerson; Erni Mangold; Johanna Hofer
- Music by: Peer Raben
- Country of origin: West Germany
- Original language: German

Production
- Cinematography: Michael Ballhaus; Ernst Schmid
- Running time: 104 minutes

Original release
- Release: 23 March 1976

I Only Want You to Love Me (German: Ich will doch nur, daß ihr mich liebt) is a 1976 West German television movie written and directed by Rainer Werner Fassbinder, and starring Vitus Zeplichal and Elke Aberle.

== Plot ==
Peter Trepper (Vitus Zeplichal) is a young man who is serving ten years in prison for committing an impulsive murder. A psychologist (Erika Runge) interviews him to learn his motive and life history. Peter has a loveless childhood in the home of his innkeeper parents (Alexander Allerson and Erni Mangold). Despite his obedience and good works, he fails to win their acceptance. Hastily, Peter marries his girlfriend Erika (Elke Aberle) and relocates to Munich, where he continues his quixotic efforts to gain approval, especially from his new wife. He pressures himself to work long hours while spending money lavishly, leading to constant stress over debts. When Peter loses his job, he finally snaps, striking and strangling a bartender (Janos Gönczöl) who reminds him of his own father.

== Cast ==
- Vitus Zeplichal : Peter
- Elke Aberle : Erika
- Alexander Allerson : Peter's father
- Erni Mangold : Peter's mother
- Johanna Hofer : Erika's grandmother
- Katharina Buchhammer : Ulla
- Wolfgang Hess : Construction foreman
- Armin Meier : Construction company manager
- Erika Runge : Psychologist
- Ulrich Radke : Erika's father
- Annemarie Wendl : Erika's mother
- Janos Gönczöl : Bartender
- Edith Volkmann : Bartender's wife
- Robert Naegele : Apartment manager
- Axel Ganz : Usher
- Inge Schulz : Mrs. Emmerich
- Heinz H. Bernstein : Furniture salesman
- Helga Bender : Saleswoman
- Adi Gruber : Postal clerk
- Heide Ackermann : Knitting machine saleswoman
- Sonja Neudorres : Jeweler
- Reinhard Brex : Businessman
- Lilo Pempeit : Elderly woman at post office

== Production ==
The film was shot in 25 days between November and December 1975 and broadcast by the ARD television network on March 23, 1976. The movie was commissioned by ARD's affiliate Westdeutsche Rundfunk Köln (WDR) and produced by Bavaria Atelier GmbH, the predecessor of Bavaria Film. The production of I Only Want You to Love Me cost roughly 800,000 Deutsche Marks.

The screenplay is based on a true story from the book Lebenslänglich - Protokolle aus der Haft (English: Life – Transcripts Behind Bars) by Klaus Antes, Christiane Ehrhardt, and Heinrich Hannover (Munich, 1972).
