= Rio das Mortes (film) =

1971 film

- Written by: Rainer Werner Fassbinder
- Directed by: Rainer Werner Fassbinder
- Starring: Hanna Schygulla; Michael König; Günther Kaufmann
- Music by: Peer Raben
- Country of origin: Germany
- Original language: German

Production
- Cinematography: Dietrich Lohmann
- Running time: 84 minutes

Original release
- Release: 15 February 1971

Rio das Mortes is a 1971 color film written and directed by Rainer Werner Fassbinder. One of the early Fassbinder films, it stars Hanna Schygulla as Hanna, Michael König as Michael/Mike and Günther Kaufmann as Gunther.

== Plot summary ==
Mike and Gunther lead a boring life in Munich. Hanna, Mike's girl friend, wants to get married but he is not interested. The two friends get hold of a treasure map of the Rio das Mortes area and decide to set out to find it in Peru. They are looking for freedom and adventure. Against Hanna's opposition, the car is sold, and the two men try to raise money. Their ignorance and clumsiness seems to lead to failure, but eventually, by luck, they find a sponsor. In the final scene, at the Munich airport, a rejected Hanna is about to shoot them as they walk to the airplane.

== Comments ==
This is Fassbinder's 8th film, one that as a TV film did not receive much attention. It is listed as a comedy and gives a biting commentary about the lives of common people in urban West Germany at that time. Fassbinder gives credit to Volker Schlöndorff for the idea of the plot. The film has been criticized for sloppiness and poor character development while the acting is commended. In a memorable scene Schygylla dances with Fassbinder who plays an unidentified stranger.

The ignorance of the two adventurers is underlined by the fact that there are two Rio Das Mortes', both in Brazil, not in Peru: there is a Rio das Mortes in Mato Grosso and a Rio das Mortes in Minas Gerais. Further, they try to find Mayan treasure in South America.

The film was filmed for TV on 16 mm and later released on DVD.
