= Fear of Fear =

- Directed by: Rainer Werner Fassbinder
- Written by: R. W. Fassbinder based on the story by Asta Scheib
- Produced by: Peter Märthesheimer (WDR)
- Cinematography: Jürgen Jürges
- Edited by: Liesgret Schmitt-Klink, Beate Fischer-Weiskirch
- Music by: Peer Raben
- Release date: 1975
- Country: West Germany
- Language: German

Fear of Fear (German: Angst vor der Angst) is a 1975 West German drama film by Rainer Werner Fassbinder starring Margit Carstensen. Fear of Fear is the fifth film by R. W. Fassbinder for the WDR in cooperation with editor Peter Märthesheimer.

== Plot ==
Margot, a woman in her mid-thirties, lives with her husband Kurt and their young daughter Bibi in their mother-in-law's house. Kurt's sister and her husband live above them. When Margot becomes pregnant, she begins to have anxiety attacks that are incomprehensible to herself and those around her. Her husband Kurt is caring, but only thinks about his exam and cannot help her. Her mother-in-law and sister-in-law, Lore, are ashamed of Margot's behavior. The pharmacist primarily has a relationship with her in mind and prescribes Valium for her without a prescription so she cannot get more later without going back to him.

Margot tries various distractions like swimming, shopping, and doing her hair, but continues to be plagued by anxiety. She becomes addicted to valium, drinks cognac like an addict and suddenly makes a suicide attempt. The doctors are at a loss: one diagnoses schizophrenia, in a psychiatric clinic a deep depression is diagnosed and work is prescribed as therapy.

Only two people, on the fringes of society, seek contact with the increasingly isolated Margot: her daughter Bibi and a mysterious neighbor. This latter is rejected by Margot and is found dead shortly afterwards, having hanged himself.

== Cast ==
- Margit Carstensen: Margot
- Ulrich Faulhaber: Kurt
- Brigitte Mira: Mother
- Irm Hermann: Lore
- Armin Meier: Karli
- Adrian Hoven: Dr. Merck
- Kurt Raab: Mr. Bauer
- Ingrid Caven: Edda
- Lilo Pempeit (R. W. Fassbinder's mother): Frau Schall
- Helga Märthesheimer: Dr. von Unruh
- Hark Bohm: Dr. Rozenbaum
- Herbert Steinmetz: Dr. Auer
- Constanze Haas: Bibi

== Background ==
FEAR OF FEAR isn't really about mental illness, it's a film about the 'normal' human condition. Mental illness is an essential part of a society like the one we live in. I only show the life of a completely normal person, not an extreme situation. (...) The film shows how someone who tries to lead a life that is alien to himself, alienated from the true self, is inevitably shattered. The life this woman has to lead is not her life. Your unconscious begins to realize that she is leading a life that really has nothing to do with her. This type of 'illness' sets in with anyone who begins to realize that the life they are leading may not be the life they would like to lead, and that most people are simply playing roles in their lives that are not theirs. This is how you get 'sick'. (...)

— R. W. Fassbinder in 'The Death of the Family' - Conversation with John Hughes and Ruth McCormick

The original script for the film was written by Asta Scheib in the form of the story "Langsame Tage" and sent to R. W. Fassbinder, whose films she admired. Asta Scheib was 35 years old at the time, a housewife and mother of two children. Until then, she had occasionally written articles for a local newspaper and a women's magazine. The story was her first film template. Fassbinder used it almost unchanged for his script.

== Reviews ==
Fassbinder, it seems, opens up a perspective on the social and psychological case history that is no longer so drastic with 'Fear of Fear', but he delivers differently than with 'Warum läuft Herr R. Amok?'. He makes it clear visually what is going on in Margot's head by repeatedly illustrating her subjects with blurred images. The eloquent camerawork with which Fassbinder is accustomed does the rest to stage Margot's gradual disappearance from normality: she often stands behind half-open doors, her face half outside, half in the room; the camera observes her through mirrors, which Margot has hung up all over the apartment, or provides extreme close-ups of her face as it drifts from one wordless hysteria to the next in all its wakefulness. 'Fear of fear' is therefore much more verbose than Fassbinder's previous psychological and social collapse studies and ends that phase of the director that was brought about by films such as 'Ali: Fear Eats the Soul', 'Martha' and 'Mutter Küsters' Fahrt zum Himmel' - films that only seemed to be interested in the consequences and not in the symptoms of the downfall.

— Stefan Höltgen

The regulated, 'normal', the familiar, the obvious, the visible, haptic stays with itself like fear stays with itself. Like the dark side of the moon, others will never see them. But Margot lives on with this dark side of the moon. The normality of the bourgeoisie has caught up with them, 'integrated' - as it is called so pretty and ugly in New High German. The fear of the abysmal remains. The tablets 'reconcile' their fear with normalcy. A flimsy solution.

— Ulrich Behrens
