= Margit Carstensen =

German actress (1940–2023)

- Born: 29 February 1940; Kiel, Gau Schleswig-Holstein, Germany
- Died: 1 June 2023 (aged 83); Heide, Schleswig-Holstein, Germany
- Occupation: Actress
- Awards: German Film Award (Gold) (1973); Bavarian Film Award (2002)

Margit Carstensen (29 February 1940 – 1 June 2023) was a German theatre and film actress, best known outside Germany for roles in the works of film director Rainer Werner Fassbinder. She appeared in films of directors Christoph Schlingensief and Leander Haußmann and on television in Tatort.

== Theater career ==
Carstensen, the daughter of a physician, was born and raised in the northern German city of Kiel. Upon graduation from the local high school in 1958 (Abitur), she studied acting at the Hochschule für Musik und Theater Hamburg. This education led to her first stage appearances in Kleve, Heilbronn, Münster, and Braunschweig. In 1965, Carstensen began a four-year engagement with the Deutsches Schauspielhaus (German Playhouse) in Hamburg. There she played leading roles in plays by John Osborne and the classical Spanish playwright Lope de Vega.

In 1969, she gained a local profile for her work in the Theater am Goetheplatz in Bremen, where she first met director Rainer Werner Fassbinder. She then worked under his direction in a comedy by the 18th-century Venetian Carlo Goldoni, The Coffee Shop (which was recorded for television in 1970), bringing her national attention in West Germany. She subsequently played the role of serial murderess Geesche Gottfried in the premiere of Fassbinder's own play Bremen Freedom (also televised, in 1972), and then in the title role of his Henrik Ibsen adaptation Nora Helmer (televised in 1974) derived from A Doll's House.

From 1973 to 1976, Carstensen held a steady acting engagement in Darmstadt. In 1977, she moved to what was then West Berlin where she performed on the highly regarded Staatliche Schauspielbühnen. In 1982, she moved to Stuttgart in order to work with director Hansgünther Heyme, where she appeared in a series of plays directed by him. Over the years she also performed in many smaller roles on the most important of the German-language stages, for example making several appearances in the Munich Kammerspiele.

By the late 1980s, she had developed ongoing working relationships with German directors Werner Schroeter, Christoph Schlingensief, and Leander Haußmann. In 1995 she followed Haußmann to Bochum, in order to work with him there. For the 2003–04 season, Carstensen appeared in the Vienna Burgtheater, in the premiere of Elfriede Jelinek's play Bambiland under the direction of Schlingensief.

In 2008, she appeared in the Schauspielhaus Bochum (Playhouse Bochum), in Shakespeare's As You Like It.

== Film and television ==
Carstensen is best known outside Germany for the many film and television productions of Rainer Werner Fassbinder in which she participated. She played leading roles in the Fassbinder films The Bitter Tears of Petra von Kant (1972), her best-known role for Fassbinder; Martha (1974), with Karlheinz Böhm, analysing a traditional marriage in a contemporary setting; Fear of Fear (1975); Mother Küsters' Trip to Heaven (1975); Satan's Brew (1976); Chinese Roulette (1976) and Women in New York (1977). She also appeared in individual episodes of two Fassbinder television productions: Eight Hours Don't Make a Day (1972), and Berlin Alexanderplatz (1980).

Carstensen also worked in international productions. In the fifth film made by Polish director Andrzej Żuławski, Possession (1981), a French-German coproduction, she performed together with Isabelle Adjani, Sam Neill and Heinz Bennent. Four years later she worked with Polish-born director Agnieszka Holland on her film Angry Harvest (1985), together with Armin Mueller-Stahl. This film was nominated for an Academy Award for Best Foreign Language Film.

Her artistic collaboration with director Christoph Schlingensief began with two of his film projects. In his 100 Years of Adolf Hitler: The Last Hour in the Führerbunker (1989), she played the part of Magda Goebbels. In his satirical political spoof Terror 2000: Germany Out of Control (1992), she played the role of a detective.

Carstensen appeared in films by directors such as Leander Haußmann (Sonnenallee, 1999); Romuald Karmakar (Manila, 2000); Chris Kraus (Scherbentanz, 2002, a role for which she won the Bavarian Film Award for Best Actress); Oskar Roehler (Agnes and His Brothers, 2004) and Detlev Buck (Hands off Mississippi, 2007).

During the 2007–08 season Carstensen assisted with the Austrian-German TV documentary Mr. Karl – A Person for People, directed by Kurt Mayer.

In 2016, she was still on television, appearing in the longrunning series Tatort.

== Death ==
Carstensen died in Heide, Schleswig-Holstein, on 1 June 2023, at age 83.

== Awards ==
Carstensen received many awards in her career. Among these were the 1973 German Film Awards (Gold), for her acting in The Bitter Tears of Petra von Kant, and the 2002 Bavarian Film Award, for her acting in Scherbentanz. In 1972 she was chosen by the German Film Critics Guild as Best Actress of the Year. In 2019, she was awarded the Götz-George-Preis for her life's work.

== Filmography ==
- The Coffee Shop (1970, TV film, based on a play by Carlo Goldoni), as Vittoria
- The Niklashausen Journey (1970, TV film), as Margarete
- Die Ahnfrau – Oratorium nach Franz Grillparzer (1971, TV film, based on a play by Franz Grillparzer), as Berta
- The Bitter Tears of Petra von Kant (1972), as Petra von Kant
- Bremen Freedom (1972, TV film), as Geesche Gottfried
- Eight Hours Don't Make a Day: Oma und Gregor (1972, TV), as Housewife
- The Tenderness of Wolves (1973), as Mrs. Lindner
- World on a Wire (1973, TV film, based on the novel Simulacron-3), as Maya Schmidt-Gentner
- Nora Helmer (1974, TV film, based on the play A Doll's House), as Nora Helmer
- Martha (1974, TV film, based on a story by Cornell Woolrich), as Martha
- Mother Küsters' Trip to Heaven (1975), as Marianne Thälmann
- Fear of Fear (1975, TV film), as Margot
- Satan's Brew (1976), as Andrée
- Chinese Roulette (1976), as Ariane Christ
- Adolf and Marlene (1977), as Marlene
- Women in New York (1977, TV film, based on the play The Women), as Sylvia Fowler
- Game of Losers (1978), as Miss Rosner
- The Third Generation (1979), as Petra Vielhaber
- Cold Homeland (1979, TV film), as Mrs. Lukaschewski
- Berlin Alexanderplatz: Epilogue (1980, TV series, based on the novel Berlin Alexanderplatz), as Terah, Angel
- Possession (1981), as Margit Gluckmeister
- The Council of Love (1982, based on a play by Oskar Panizza), as Prosecutor
- The Roaring Fifties (1983, based on a novel by Johannes Mario Simmel), as Secretary
- An Ideal Husband (1984, TV film, based on the play An Ideal Husband), as Lady Markby
- Emilia Galotti (1984, TV film, based on the play Emilia Galotti), as Countess Orsina
- Angry Harvest (1985), as Eugenia
- Half of Love (a.k.a. La Moitié de l'amour, 1985)
- 100 Years of Adolf Hitler: The Last Hour in the Führerbunker (1989), as Magda Goebbels
- Underground (1989, TV film), as Krista/Tina
- Derrick (1991, TV series, episode "Wer bist du, Vater?"/"Who are you, Father?"), as Mrs. Hauser
- Terror 2000: Germany Out of Control (1992), as Margret
- Anwalt Abel (1997, TV series, episode "Das schmutzige Dutzend"), as Mrs. Nussbauer
- Gesche's Poison (1997), as Mrs. Timm
- The 120 Days of Bottrop (1997), as Margit
- Rider of the Flames (1998), as Mrs. von Proeck
- Sonnenallee (1999), as Direktorin
- John Gabriel Borkman (2000, TV film, based on the play John Gabriel Borkman), as Gunhild Borkman
- Manila (2000), as Regine Görler
- The Fool and His Wife This Evening in Pancomedia (2002, TV film, based on a play by Botho Strauß)
- Shattered Glass (2002), as Käthe
- Agnes and His Brothers (2004), as Roxy
- The Captain from Köpenick (2005, TV film, based on the play The Captain of Köpenick), as Marie Hoprecht
- It Is Fine! Everything Is Fine. (2007), as Linda Barnes
- Hands off Mississippi (2007), as Mrs. Strietzel
- Mr. Karl – A Person for People (2008, TV documentary)
- Eine Kirche der Angst vor dem Fremden in mir (2009, TV film)
- Finsterworld (2013), as Mrs. Sandberg
- Tatort (2016, TV series, episode "Wofür es sich zu leben lohnt"), as Margarethe Weißkopf
