= Martha (1974 film) =

1974 film by Rainer Werner Fassbinder

- Theatrical release poster
- Based on: For the Rest of Her Life by Cornell Woolrich
- Screenplay by: Rainer Werner Fassbinder
- Directed by: Rainer Werner Fassbinder
- Starring: Margit Carstensen; Karlheinz Böhm; Gisela Fackeldey; Adrian Hoven; Barbara Valentin
- Country of origin: West Germany
- Original language: German

Production
- Producer: Peter Märthesheimer
- Cinematography: Michael Ballhaus
- Editor: Liesgret Schmitt-Klink
- Running time: 116 min

Original release
- Release: 28 May 1974

Martha is a 1974 drama film made for West German television directed by Rainer Werner Fassbinder. It features Margit Carstensen in the title role with Karlheinz Böhm as her abusive husband. It is one of the earliest of Fassbinder's films to be influenced by the American work of Douglas Sirk. The plot was loosely based on the short story For the Rest of Her Life by Cornell Woolrich.

== Plot ==
Martha Heyer, a virginal 31-year-old librarian, is on vacation in Rome with her cold father, a fastidious man who refuses to be touched. At their first stop while touring the city, the Spanish Steps, he suffers a heart attack and dies. Martha soon discovers that her purse, containing all of her money, has been stolen in the confusion. She reaches for help at the German embassy and phones her mother giving her the bad news. Leaving the embassy, Martha crosses the path of a gentleman, who catches her eye – and she his. They are mutually mesmerized but keep going their own ways.

Back in her hometown, Constance, Martha is ill-received by her mother, who blames her for her father's death. Martha's mother, an alcoholic, takes openly to drinking, tranquilizers and drawing mustaches on old photographs of her deceased husband. Martha turns down an offer of marriage from her boss at the library, who immediately proposes to her colleague, Erna. During the wedding celebration, Martha is formally introduced to Helmut Salomon, a wealthy civil engineer, who was the man with whom she crossed glances leaving the German embassy. On their first conversation outside the party, Helmut insults her by detailing her physical shortcomings, and Martha meekly accepts these as fact and rewards him with a kiss.

Helmut takes her to an amusement park and insists that they take a ride together on the roller coaster, despite Martha being terrified of the idea. After the ride, she vomits and he proposes marriage. Martha, her face streaked with tears and vomit, thanks him and gleefully accepts. Martha's mother, in a hysterical reaction to the news that her daughter intends to marry, swallows an overdose of pills and collapses to the floor. Helmut takes the opportunity to have Martha's mother institutionalized.

The couple goes on honeymoon to the Italian coast. Helmut, in addition to starting to control Martha's diet, refuses to allow her to apply suntan oil, which results in her getting severely sunburned. Once in their hotel room he forces himself upon the painfully sunburned Martha who screams. Upon their return to Constance, Helmut proves to be both sadistic and domineering. He bites on her neck and shoulders and becomes aroused whenever she is in emotional or physical pain. Martha reaches out tentatively for guidance from her friend Marianne, but is unable to explain Helmut's behavior. Marianne in any case is not much of a help.

Helmut insists that they move out of Martha's childhood home so that they can start anew. Without consulting her, he arranges for her to leave her job; he works at changing her musical tastes; he insists on her reading an engineering text related to his work; he tries controlling her contact with the outside world, finally having their telephone disconnected and not allowing her to leave the house anymore. Martha submits to her husband's will with increasing reluctance. His violent sexuality is not stopped by her hysterical acts of resistance. When she tries to please him with some spontaneous gesture of giving, such as his favorite dinner or a new hairdo, she is ridiculed for her foolishness. Helmut frustrates Martha's hopes at every turn. She wants to start a family but her husband refuses to have children citing her mother's derangement. After much begging Helmut allows her to have a pet cat, but shortly afterwards she finds the cat dead.

One day, Martha finds Helmut waiting at home for her, and he announces that he has a present for her in the bedroom. She interprets this as his intending to kill her. She runs away, ultimately ending up seeking help from Mr. Kaiser, a friend and colleague who she had trained at the library. He agrees to take her for a car ride. She has become so paranoid, now, that she imagines that the car behind them is Helmut in pursuit. She grabs the wheel of the vehicle, causing the car to crash. Martha wakes up in the hospital and learns that Kaiser died in the accident and that she herself will be paralyzed for life in her lower body. She is told not to worry, however. Helmut is not the kind of man to abandon her in need. Helmut takes Martha out the hospital in her wheelchair.

== Cast ==
- Margit Carstensen – Martha
- Karlheinz Böhm – Helmut Salomon
- Gisela Fackeldey – Martha's mother
- Peter Chatel – Mr. Kaiser
- Adrian Hoven – Martha's father
- Barbara Valentin – Marianne, Martha's friend
- Ingrid Caven – Ilse
- Kurt Raab – the embassy secretary
- Ortrud Beginnen – Erna von Scratch
- Wolfgang Schenk – Herr Meister
- Günter Lamprecht – Dr. Herbert Salomon, Helmut's brother

== Production ==
Martha was filmed in 1973 immediately before the shooting of Fear Eats the Soul but broadcast after the latter's theatrical release. Shot in the summer of 1973, during the last three months of a year-long break from filming Effi Briest. It was produced by WDR television network at a cost of approximately 500.000 DM. Fassbinder had more than his usual budget and this allowed him to film the Italian scenes and to incorporate an elaborate camera style with some creative visual effects like the circular dolly shot, when Martha and Helmut first cross paths in Rome. Martha was shot on 16 mm film stock and broadcast on ARD television on May 28, 1974. The film has since been restored and had its theatrical premiere in 35 mm at the Venice Film Festival in September 1994 and was re-released in Germany on 18 November 1994.

== DVD release ==
The film was released on Region 1 DVD in the US on 13 April 2004 with English subtitles. The extras include the documentary Fassbinder in Hollywood. A Region 2 release followed in 2007 as part of a boxset.

== Bibliography ==
- Thomsen, Christian Braad, Fassbinder: Life and Work of a Provocative Genius, University of Minnesota Press, 2004, ISBN 0-8166-4364-4
- Watson, Wallace Steadman, Rainer Werner Fassbinder: Film as Private and Public Art, University of South Carolina Press, 1996, ISBN 1-57003-079-0
