= Michael Fengler =

German film director (born 1940)

- Born: 14 November 1940 (age 85); Königsberg, East-Prussia, Germany (now Kaliningrad, Russia)
- Occupations: Film producer, director, screenwriter
- Years active: 1970-2001

Michael Fengler (born 14 November 1940) is a German film producer, director and screenwriter. In 1970, along with Rainer Werner Fassbinder, he co-directed the film Why Does Herr R. Run Amok?. It was entered into the 20th Berlin International Film Festival.

== Selected filmography ==
- Why Does Herr R. Run Amok? (1970, directed by Rainer Werner Fassbinder and Michael Fengler)
- The Niklashausen Journey (1970, directed by Rainer Werner Fassbinder and Michael Fengler)
- Weg vom Fenster (1971, directed by Michael Fengler) (TV film)
- The Bitter Tears of Petra von Kant (1972, directed by Rainer Werner Fassbinder)
- Output (1974, directed by Michael Fengler)
- Shadow of Angels (1976, directed by Daniel Schmid)
- Chinese Roulette (1977, directed by Rainer Werner Fassbinder)
- Petty Thieves (1977, directed by Michael Fengler)
- Orchestra Rehearsal (1978, directed by Federico Fellini)
- The Marriage of Maria Braun (1979, directed by Rainer Werner Fassbinder)
- Traffic Jam (1979, directed by Luigi Comencini)
- Ernesto (1979, directed by Salvatore Samperi)
