= The Stationmaster's Wife =

- Based on: Bolwieser: The Novel of a Husband by Oskar Maria Graf
- Screenplay by: Rainer Werner Fassbinder
- Directed by: Rainer Werner Fassbinder
- Starring: Elisabeth Trissenaar; Kurt Raab; Udo Kier; Volker Spengler; Gottfried John
- Music by: Peer Raben
- Country of origin: West Germany
- Original language: German

Production
- Producers: Herbert Knopp; Willi Segler
- Cinematography: Michael Ballhaus
- Editors: Rainer Werner Fassbinder; Juliane Lorenz; Ila von Hasperg
- Running time: 201 minutes
- Production companies: Bavaria Atelier; Bavaria Film
- Budget: DEM 1.8 million

Original release
- Release: 31 July 1977

The Stationmaster's Wife (German: Bolwieser) is a 1977 German television serial directed and edited by Rainer Werner Fassbinder. It was made for German television and originally aired in 1973 as a two-part miniseries. It was based on the 1931 novel Bolwieser: The Novel of a Husband by Oskar Maria Graf.

The plot revolves around railway station master Xaver Ferdinand Maria Bolwieser, who is unwittingly cuckolded by the town butcher and a hairdresser. Critic Vincent Canby, in his 1982 New York Times review, said the story, which is set in the fictional Bavarian town of Werburg in the 1920s, was reminiscent of Madame Bovary.

The 1983 theatrical release was 90 minutes shorter than the 201 minute TV version. The theatrical cut had been finalized and approved in 1977, but the release was postponed due to legal and commercial reasons.

== Notes ==
In the credits, Fassbinder, who edited the film with Juliane Lorenz and Ila von Hasperg, was billed as a cutter under the stage name "Franz Walsch".
