= Spreepiraten =

- Country of origin: Germany

Spreepiraten is a German television series.

== See also ==
- List of German television series
