= Shadow of Angels =

1976 film

- Directed by: Daniel Schmid
- Screenplay by: Daniel Schmid; Rainer Werner Fassbinder
- Based on: Der Müll, die Stadt und der Tod by Rainer Werner Fassbinder
- Produced by: Michael Fengler
- Starring: Ingrid Caven
- Cinematography: Renato Berta
- Edited by: Ila von Hasperg
- Release date: 31 January 1976
- Running time: 101 minutes
- Country: Switzerland
- Language: German

Shadow of Angels (German: Schatten der Engel) is a 1976 Swiss drama film directed by Daniel Schmid and written by Schmid and Rainer Werner Fassbinder. Adapted from Fassbinder's play Der Müll, die Stadt und der Tod, the film stars Ingrid Caven and was screened in competition at the 1976 Cannes Film Festival.

== Synopsis ==
The film tells the story of a prostitute who lives with her pimp until she meets a man who advises her not to speak and pays for her silence. From then on, she listens to powerful men and later becomes rich and powerful herself, but can no longer endure her situation. She then begins searching for the person who can understand her story and kill her.

== Cast ==
The cast includes:

- Ingrid Caven as Lily Brest
- Rainer Werner Fassbinder as Raoul
- Klaus Löwitsch as Jude
- Annemarie Düringer as Frau Müller
- Adrian Hoven as Herr Müller

== Production ==
Shadow of Angels was adapted from Rainer Werner Fassbinder's play Der Müll, die Stadt und der Tod. Fassbinder had originally tried to film the play himself, but the project failed to secure financing. Daniel Schmid then directed the adaptation. The source play sparked debate over alleged antisemitic tendencies. It was Schmid's first film based on a screenplay by another writer.

== Festival screenings ==
The film premiered in 1976 and had festival screenings including an in-competition screening at the Festival international du film de Cannes in 1976, the Festival International du film de La Rochelle in 1994, the 37th Kyiv International Film Festival Molodist in 2007, the 64th Festival del film Locarno in 2011, the 30th Filmfest München in 2012, the 24th Ankara International Film Festival in 2013, the 50th Solothurner Filmtage in 2015, and the 35th FID Festival international de cinéma Marseille in 2024.
