= Satan's Brew =

1976 film

- DVD cover
- Directed by: Rainer Werner Fassbinder
- Written by: Rainer Werner Fassbinder
- Starring: Kurt Raab; Margit Carstensen
- Release date: October 7, 1976
- Country: West Germany
- Language: German

Satan's Brew (German: Satansbraten) is a 1976 German film directed by Rainer Werner Fassbinder.

== Plot ==
The poet Walter Kranz and his wife Luise live with Walter's mentally disabled brother Ernst. They have money problems, as the formerly successful "poet of the revolution" has not written anything in two years. His bank account is overdrawn, his publisher refuses to give him an advance, and he has already accumulated too many debts with his friends Lisa and Rolf. One of Walter's mistresses, Irmgard von Witzleben, writes him a check, but he shoots her while roleplaying with a gun.

Walter gets the idea to write about a prostitute and begins to interview Lana von Meyerbeer, but soon runs out of questions and has sex with her. Luise watches and complains that he has not had sex with her in seventeen days. Meanwhile, Ernst is increasing his collection of dead flies. While a policeman comes to ask for Walter's alibi for Irmgard's supposed murder, movers come to repossess his furniture. Walter visits his lover Lisa, whose husband does not mind. Lisa agrees to give an alibi.

In search of money, Walter sends for his admirer Andrée, who has been writing letters to him for years. She happily moves in with Walter, Luise, and Ernst. Andrée makes all her savings available to him, is devoted to Walter, and lets herself be repeatedly humiliated by him. She is even raped in the coal cellar by Ernst at Walter's suggestion.

Walter writes a poem, which his wife realizes that he has plagiarized from Stefan George. Walter uses Andrée's money to have a suit tailored, puts on a wig, and – like George – begins to read his texts to a small group of followers.

When Andrée's savings run out, Walter's audience also fails to return, because he was paying them to attend his lectures. With the exception of Andrée, Walter's only remaining disciple is a young man named Urs, who promises to bring his brother. When Luise points out that Stefan George was a homosexual, Walter goes cruising in a men's toilet. He meets a gigolo, but cannot go through with having gay sex, and the prostitute proves incapable of assisting with his readings. Walter eventually declares Stefan George to be dead.

The lack of money drives Walter to visit his aging parents, whom he cons out of their meager funeral savings. Andrée, who constantly follows him, is shocked to find out Walter's parents are not as wealthy and educated as he had made it seem.

Soon, Walter's creative crisis is over: he is writing again and reading to Andrée and his two disciples. However, he still lacks money, which brings him to surprise the prostitute Lana in her apartment. When he realizes that she is married, he uses blackmail to demand her savings. Lana's protectors later savagely beat him up in front of Andrée. When Walter smiles, Andrée takes this to mean that he is weak and renounces her belief in him.

Walter eventually finishes his book No Celebration for the Führer's Dead Dog, and the publisher is satisfied: it is now "no more cramped left kitsch", but has "power" and "size". Walter returns home to find out that Luise has been hospitalized. All this time, he had never paid attention to her appearance or her comments on her declining health. When he arrives at the hospital with the two remaining disciples, Luise has already died. He collapses theatrically, disappointing the disciples, before whom Walter has always sworn to be strong.

He declares everything to be acting to the doctor. Upon hearing about his new work, he calls Walter lucky. Walter later calls the policeman and accuses Ernst of Irmgard's murder. Ernst overhears this and shoots Walter with the gun; the latter falls unconscious to the floor. The policeman soon arrives to the apartment with Irmgard, who only pretended to be dead. The gun, as it turns out, only shoots blanks. Irmgard pours a bucket of water over Walter and lets him stand up again. Confused, Walter then asks, "Is this paradise?" The policeman and Irmgard start laughing and, after realizing what is going on, Walter laughs as well.

== Cast ==
- Kurt Raab : Walter Kranz
- Margit Carstensen - Andrée
- Helen Vita - Luise Kranz
- Volker Spengler - Ernst Kranz
- Ingrid Caven - Lisa
- Marquard Bohm - Rolf
- Y Sa Lo - Lana von Meyerbeer
- Ulli Lommel - Lauf
- Brigitte Mira - Mrs. Kranz
- Katherina Buchhammer - Irmgart von Witzleben
- Armin Meier - Hustler

== Reception ==
The film was turned down for an official screening at the Berlin Film Festival. It divided critics, with some in Berlin not finding the film funny.
