= Rainer Werner Fassbinder =

German filmmaker (1945–1982)

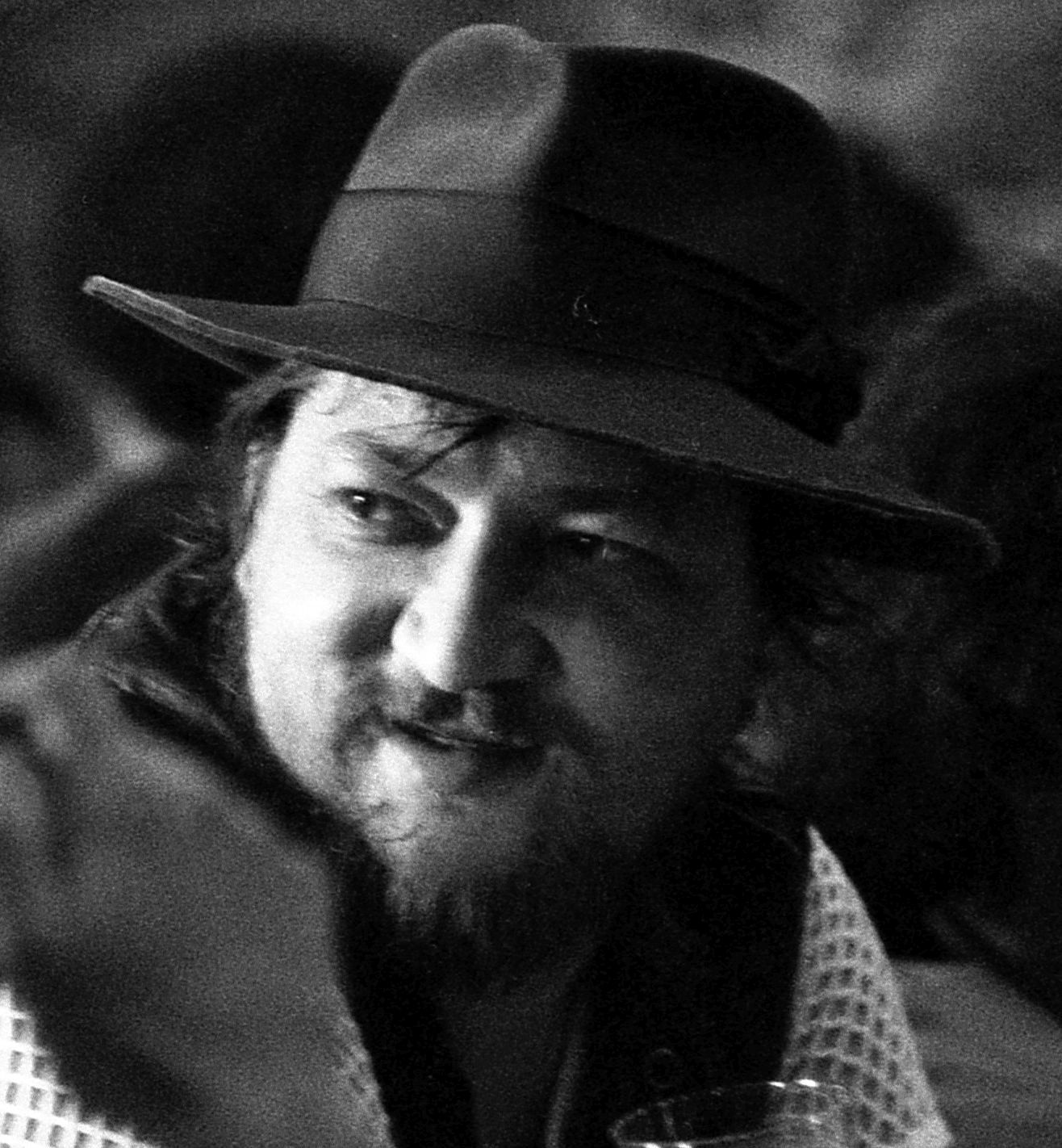
- Fassbinder in 1980
- Born: 31 May 1945; Bad Wörishofen, Germany
- Died: 10 June 1982 (aged 37); Munich, West Germany
- Resting place: Bogenhausen Cemetery, Munich, Germany
- Other name: Franz Walsch
- Occupations: Director; screenwriter; producer; dramatist; actor
- Years active: 1965–1982
- Movement: New German Cinema
- Spouse: Ingrid Caven (m. 1970; div. 1972)
- Partner: El Hedi ben Salem (1971-1974)
- Parent: Lilo Pempeit
- Website: fassbinderfoundation.de

Signature
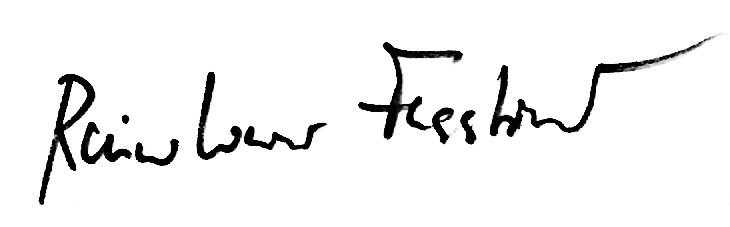

Rainer Werner Fassbinder (German: [ˈʁaɪnɐ ˈvɛʁnɐ ˈfasbɪndɐ]; 31 May 1945 – 10 June 1982), sometimes credited as R. W. Fassbinder, was a German filmmaker, dramatist and actor. He is widely regarded as one of the major figures and catalysts of the New German Cinema movement. He directed over 40 films that span a variety of genres; frequently his work blends elements of Hollywood melodrama with social criticism and avant-garde techniques. His films, according to him, explored "the exploitability of feelings". His work was deeply rooted in post-war German culture: the aftermath of Nazism, the German economic miracle and the Red Army Faction. Early on, Fassbinder focused on marginalized figures in the city—migrant workers, prisoners, and gay people. He worked with a company of actors and technicians who frequently appeared in his projects.

Fassbinder began leading the acting troupe Anti-Theater in 1967, with whom he staged some of his earliest productions. His first feature-length film was a gangster movie called Love Is Colder Than Death (1969); he scored his first domestic commercial success with The Merchant of Four Seasons (1972) and his first international success with Ali: Fear Eats the Soul (1974), both of which are considered masterpieces by contemporary critics. Big-budget projects such as Despair (1978), Lili Marleen and Lola (both 1981) followed. His greatest success came with The Marriage of Maria Braun (1979), chronicling the rise and fall of a German woman in the wake of World War II. Other notable films include the lesbian chamber drama The Bitter Tears of Petra von Kant (1972), Fox and His Friends (1975), Satan's Brew (1976), In a Year of 13 Moons (1978) and Querelle (1982), all of which dealt with homoerotic themes. He also directed the TV series World on a Wire (1973) and Berlin Alexanderplatz (1980).

Fassbinder died on 10 June 1982, aged 37, from a lethal cocktail of cocaine and barbiturates. His career lasted less than two decades, but he was extremely prolific; between 1967 and 1982, he completed over 40 feature films, 24 plays, two television serials, three short films and four video productions, winning five of the most prestigious prizes for feature film in Germany, including the Golden Bear and multiple German Film Awards. His premature death is often considered the end of the New German Cinema timeframe.

== Early life ==
Fassbinder was born in the small town of Bad Wörishofen on 31 May 1945. He was born three weeks after US Army occupied the town and the unconditional surrender of Germany. The aftermath of World War II deeply marked his childhood and the lives of his family. In compliance with his mother's wishes, Fassbinder later claimed he was born on 31 May 1946, to more clearly establish himself as a child of the post-war period; his real age was revealed shortly before his death. He was the only child of Liselotte Pempeit (1922–93), a translator, and Helmut Fassbinder, a doctor who worked from the couple's apartment in Sendlinger Straße, near Munich's red light district. When he was three months old, he was left with a paternal uncle and aunt in the country, since his parents feared he would not survive the winter with them. He was one year old when he was returned to his parents in Munich. Fassbinder's mother came from the Free City of Danzig (now Gdańsk, Poland), whence many Germans had fled following World War II. As a result, a number of her relatives came to live with them in Munich.

Fassbinder's parents were cultured members of the bourgeoisie. His father concentrated on his career, which he saw as a means to inspire his passion for writing poetry. His mother largely ignored him as well, spending the majority of her time with her husband working on his career. In 1951, Liselotte Pempeit and Helmut Fassbinder divorced. Helmut moved to Cologne while Liselotte raised her son as a single parent in Munich. To support herself and her child, Pempeit took in boarders and found employment as a German to English translator. When she was working, she often sent her son to the cinema to pass time. Later in life, Fassbinder claimed that he saw at least one film a day, sometimes as many as four per day. During this period, Pempeit was often away from her son for long periods while she recuperated from tuberculosis. In his mother's absence, Fassbinder was looked after by his mother's tenants and friends. As he was often left alone, he became used to the independence and later became a juvenile delinquent. He clashed with his mother's younger lover Siegfried, who lived with them when Fassbinder was around eight or nine years old. He had a similar difficult relationship with the much older journalist Wolff Eder (c.1905–71), who became his stepfather in 1959. Early in his adolescence, Fassbinder came out as bisexual.

As a teen, Fassbinder was sent to boarding school. His time there was marred by his repeated escape attempts, and he eventually left school before any final examinations. At the age of 15, he moved to Cologne with his father. Though they argued constantly, Fassbinder stayed with his father for a couple of years while attending night school. To earn money, he worked small jobs; he also helped his father, who rented apartments to migrant workers. During this time, Fassbinder began to immerse himself in his father's world of culture, writing poems, short plays, and stories.

== Beginnings ==
In 1963, aged 18, Fassbinder returned to Munich with plans to attend night school with the idea to eventually study drama. Following his mother's advice, he took acting lessons and from 1964 to 1966 attended the Fridl-Leonhard Studio for actors in Munich. There, he met Hanna Schygulla, who would become one of his most important actors. During this time, aged 20, he made his first 8mm short films, worked as a sound man in student films and as an assistant director or in small acting roles in theatre. During this period, he also wrote the tragic-comic play: Drops on Hot Stones. To gain entry to the Berlin Film School, Fassbinder submitted a film version of his play Parallels. He also entered several 8 mm films including This Night (now considered lost), but he was turned down for admission, as were Werner Schroeter and Rosa von Praunheim who would also have careers as film directors.

He returned to Munich where he continued with his writing. He also made two short films, The City Tramp (Der Stadtstreicher, 1966) and The Little Chaos (Das Kleine Chaos, 1967). Shot in black and white, they were financed by Fassbinder's lover, Christoph Roser, an aspiring actor from a wealthy family, in exchange for leading roles. Fassbinder acted in both of these films, which also featured Irm Hermann. In the latter, his mother – under the name of Lilo Pempeit – played the first of many parts in her son's films.

== Theatre career ==
At the age of 22, Fassbinder joined the now defunct Munich Action-Theatre in 1967; there, he was active as actor, director and scriptwriter. After two months he became the theatre's leader. In April 1968, he directed the production of his play Katzelmacher, which tells the story of a foreign worker from Greece who becomes the object of intense racial, sexual, and political hatred among a group of Bavarian "slackers". A few weeks later, in May 1968, the Action-Theatre was disbanded after its theatre was wrecked by one of its founders, while Fassbinder was imprisoned in France, at the Fresnes prison, after being arrested at a gay sauna. It promptly reformed as the Anti-Theatre under Fassbinder's direction. The troupe lived and performed together. This close-knit group of young actors included among them Fassbinder, Peer Raben, Harry Baer and Kurt Raab, who along with Hanna Schygulla and Irm Hermann became the most important members of his cinematic stock company. Working with the Anti-Theatre, Fassbinder continued writing, directing and acting. In the space of 18 months he directed 12 plays. Of these 12 plays, four were written by Fassbinder; he rewrote five others.

The style of his stage directing closely resembled that of his early films, a mixture of choreographed movement and static poses, taking its cues from musicals, cabaret, films and the student protest movement.

After he made his earliest feature films in 1969, when he was 24, Fassbinder centered his career on directing films but maintained an intermittent foothold in the theater until his death. He worked in various productions throughout Germany and made a number of radio plays in the early 1970s. In 1974, aged 29, he took directorial control over the Theater am Turm (TAT) of Frankfurt; when this project ended in failure and controversy, he became less interested in theatre.

In honor of Rosa von Praunheim, Fassbinder staged the play Dedicated to Rosa von Praunheim.

== Early films and acclaim ==
Fassbinder used his theatrical work as a springboard for making films; and many of the Anti-Theater actors and crew worked with him throughout his entire career (for instance, he made 20 films each with actresses Hanna Schygulla and Irm Herrmann). He was strongly influenced by Brecht's Verfremdungseffekt (alienation effect) and the French New Wave cinema, particularly the works of Jean-Luc Godard. He also praised The Damned (1969) by Luchino Visconti as his favorite movie. Other filmmakers who influenced Fassbinder included Howard Hawks, Michael Curtiz, Raoul Walsh, and Nicholas Ray.

Fassbinder developed his rapid working methods early. Because he knew his actors and technicians so well, Fassbinder was able to complete as many as four or five films per year on extremely low budgets. This allowed him to compete successfully for the government grants needed to continue making films.

Unlike the other major auteurs of the New German Cinema, Volker Schlöndorff, Werner Herzog and Wim Wenders, who started out making movies, Fassbinder's stage background was evident throughout his work. Additionally, he learned how to handle all phases of production, from writing and acting to direction and theater management. This versatility surfaced in his films too where, in addition to some of the aforementioned responsibilities, Fassbinder served as composer, production designer, cinematographer, producer and editor. He also appeared in 30 projects of other directors.

By 1976, Fassbinder had gained international prominence, prizes at major film festivals, premieres and retrospectives in Paris, New York and Los Angeles, and a study of his work by Tony Rayns had been published. All these factors helped make him a familiar name among cinephiles and campus audiences throughout the world. He lived in Munich when not traveling, rented a house in Paris with ex-wife Ingrid Caven. He was often seen in gay bars in New York, earning him cult hero status, but also a controversial reputation in and out of his films. His films were a fixture in art houses of the time after he became internationally known with Ali: Fear Eats the Soul. In 1977, he was a member of the jury at the 27th Berlin International Film Festival.

== Film career ==
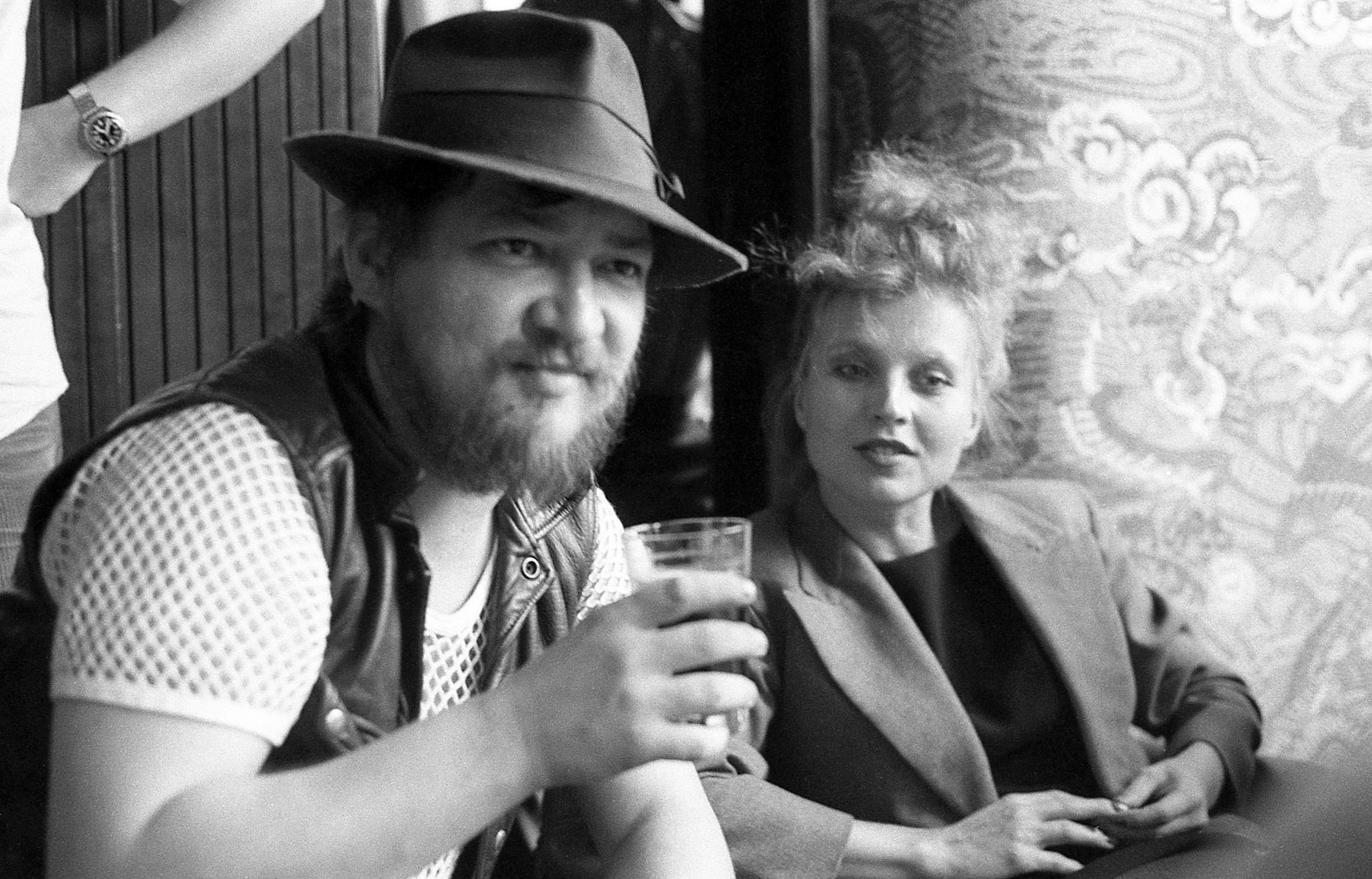
Fassbinder and Hanna Schygulla at the 1980 Venice Film Festival

Beginning at the age of 21, Fassbinder made forty-four films and television dramas in 15 years, along with directing 15 plays for the theatre. These films were largely written or adapted for the screen by Fassbinder. He was also art director on most of the early films, editor or co-editor on many of them (often credited as Franz Walsh, though the spelling varies), and he acted in 19 of his own films as well as for other directors. He wrote 14 plays, created new versions of six classical plays, and directed or co-directed 25 stage plays. He wrote and directed four radio plays and wrote song lyrics. In addition, he wrote 33 screenplays and collaborated with other screenwriters on 13 more. On top of this, he occasionally performed many other roles such as cinematographer and producer on a small number of them. Working with a regular ensemble of actors and technicians, he was able to complete films ahead of schedule and often under budget and thus compete successfully for government subsidies. He worked fast, typically omitting rehearsals and going with the first take.

Fassbinder's first ten films (1969–1971) were said to be an extension of his work in the theater, shot usually with a static camera and with deliberately unnaturalistic dialogue.

In 1971 through 1977, his films brought him international attention, with films modeled, to ironic effect, on the melodramas Douglas Sirk made in Hollywood in the 1950s. In these films, Fassbinder explored how deep-rooted prejudices about race, sex, sexual orientation, politics and class are inherent in society, while also tackling his trademark subject of the everyday fascism of family life and friendship.

The final films, from around 1977 until his death, were more varied, with international actors sometimes used and the stock company disbanded, although the casts of some films were still filled with Fassbinder regulars. He became increasingly idiosyncratic in terms of plot, form and subject matter in movies like The Marriage of Maria Braun (1979), The Third Generation (1979) and Querelle (1982). He also articulated his themes in the bourgeois milieu with his trilogy about women in post-fascist Germany: The Marriage of Maria Braun (1979), The Angst of Veronica Voss and Lola.

"I would like to build a house with my films", Fassbinder once remarked. "Some are the cellars, others the walls, still others the windows. But I hope in the end it will be a house."

Fassbinder's work as a filmmaker was honored in the 2007 exhibition Fassbinder: Berlin Alexanderplatz, which was organized by Klaus Biesenbach at the Museum of Contemporary Art together with Kunst-Werke Institute for Contemporary Art, Berlin. For his exhibition at MoMA, Klaus Biesenbach received the International Association of Art Critics (AICA) award.

=== Avant-garde films (1969–1971) ===
Working simultaneously in theater and film, Fassbinder created his own style from a fusion of the two artforms. His ten early films are characterized by a self-conscious and assertive formalism. Influenced by Jean-Luc Godard, Jean-Marie Straub and the theories of Bertolt Brecht, these films are austere and minimalist in style. Although praised by many critics, they proved too demanding and inaccessible for a mass audience. Fassbinder's rapid working methods had begun by this stage.

==== Love Is Colder Than Death (1969) ====
Shot in black-and-white with a shoestring budget in April 1969, Fassbinder's first feature-length film, Love Is Colder Than Death (1969) (Liebe ist kälter als der Tod), was a deconstruction of the American gangster films of the 1930s, 1940s and 1950s. Fassbinder plays the lead role of Franz, a small-time pimp who is torn between his mistress Joanna, a sex worker played by Hanna Schygulla, and his friend Bruno, a gangster sent after Franz by the syndicate that he has refused to join. Joanna informs the police of a bank robbery the two men have planned. Bruno is killed in the shootout, but Franz and Joanna escape.

Love Is Colder Than Death is a low-key film with muted tone, long sequences, non-naturalistic acting and little dialogue. Success was not immediate. Love Is Colder Than Death was ill-received at its premiere at the Berlin Film Festival. The film, however, already displays the themes that were to remain present through the director's subsequent work: loneliness, the longing for companionship and love, and the fear and reality of betrayal.

==== Katzelmacher (1969) ====
Fassbinder's second film, Katzelmacher (1969; the title is a Bavarian pejorative slang term for a foreign worker from the Mediterranean), was received more positively, garnering five prizes after its debut at Mannheim. It features a group of rootless and bored young couples who spend much of their time in idle chatter, empty boasting, drinking, playing cards, intriguing or simply sitting around. The arrival of Jorgos, a guest worker from Greece, leads to a growing curiosity on the part of the women and the antagonism among the men living in a suburban block of apartments in Munich. This kind of social criticism, featuring alienated characters unable to escape the forces of oppression, is a constant throughout Fassbinder's oeuvre. Katzelmacher was adapted from Fassbinder's first produced play – a short piece that was expanded from forty minutes to feature length, moving the action from a country village to Munich and delaying the appearance of Jorgos.

==== Gods of the Plague (1970) ====
Gods of the Plague (Götter der Pest) is a bleak gangster film with a winter setting, shot mostly indoors and at night. The character of Franz (from Fassbinder's first film, but now played by Harry Baer) is released from prison, but falls back with the wrong crowd. He teams up with his best friend, a black Bavarian criminal who killed his brother, to raid a supermarket. Both men are betrayed by Franz's jilted lover Joanna who tips off the police. Franz is killed, and the film ends at his laconic funeral.

Similar in plot and characters to both Love is Colder than Death (1969) and The American Soldier (1970), Gods of the Plague's theme of homoerotic love would reappear repeatedly in the director's films.

==== Why Does Herr R. Run Amok? (1970) ====
The last of the four films Fassbinder shot in 1969, was his first in color, Why Does Herr R. Run Amok? (Warum läuft Herr R. Amok?). It was co-directed by Michael Fengler (the friend who had been his cameraman on the short film The Little Chaos in 1967). Only the outlines of the scenes were sketched by Fassbinder. Fengler and the cast then improvised the dialogue. Fassbinder asserted that this was really Fengler's work rather than his. Nevertheless, the two were jointly given a directorial award for the project in the 1971 German Film prize competition, and Why Does Herr R. Run Amok? has always been considered among Fassbinder's films.

Why Does Herr R. Run Amok? portrays the life of Herr Raab, a technical draughtsman married and with a small child. The pressures of middle-class life take a toll on him. A visit by a woman neighbor occasions the incident that gives the film its title. Irritated by the incessant chat between his wife and her friend while he tries to watch TV, Herr Raab kills the neighbor with a blow to the head with a candle stick and then kills both his wife and their son. Herr Raab is later found hanged in an office restroom.

==== The American Soldier (1970) ====
The main theme of the gangster film The American Soldier (Der Amerikanische Soldat) is that violence is an expression of frustrated love. A sudden frenzied outburst of repressed passion, the revelation of desire and a need for love that has been thwarted and comes too late is central here. The eponymous hit man of the title (actually a German, played by Karl Scheydt) is a cold-blooded contract killer, who returns from Vietnam to his native Munich, where he is hired by three renegade policemen to do away with a number of undesirables. Eventually he ends up killing the girlfriend of one of the policemen with his friend Franz Walsh (Fassbinder). The film closes with the music of the song "So much tenderness", written by Fassbinder and sung by Gunther Kaufmann. The American Soldier is the third and final installment of Fassbinder's loose trilogy of gangster pictures formed by Love Is Colder Than Death and Gods of the Plague. It pays homage to the Hollywood gangster genre, and also alludes to Southern Gothic race narratives.

==== The Niklashausen Journey (1970) ====
In The Niklashausen Journey (Die Niklashauser Fahrt), Fassbinder co-writes and co-directs with Michael Fengler. This avant-garde film, commissioned by the WDR television network, was shot in May 1970 and it was broadcast in October the same year.The Niklashausen Journey was loosely based on the real-life of Hans Boehm, a shepherd who in 1476 claimed that the Virgin Mary called him to foment an uprising against the church and upper classes. Despite a temporary success, Boehm's followers were eventually massacred and he was burned at the stake. Fassbinder's intention was to show how and why revolutions fail. His approach was to compare the political and sexual turmoil of feudal Germany with that of the contraculture movement and the protests of 1968. Fassbinder did not clarify the time frame of the action, mixing medieval elements (including some costumes, settings, speech and music) with those from other time periods, like the Russian Revolution, the Rococo period, postwar Germany and the Third World.

The Niklashausen Journey, influenced by Jean-Luc Godard's Weekend and Glauber Rocha's Antonio das Mortes, consists of only about a dozen or so scenes, most of which are either theatrical tableaux where there is no movement of the characters and the camera darts from speaker to speaker or are shots where characters pace back and forth while giving revolutionary speeches about Marxist struggles and debates on economic theories.

==== Whity (1970) ====
Set in 1876, Whity centers on the title character, a mulatto who works as the obsequious servant in the mansion of a dysfunctional family in the American South. He is the illegitimate son of the family patriarch and the black cook. Whity tries to carry out all their orders, however demeaning until several of the family members ask him to kill some of the others. He eventually kills them all and runs away to the desert with a prostitute from the local bar.

The film was shot in Almeria, Spain, in widescreen, on locations built for the Westerns made by Sergio Leone. Its production was particularly traumatic for cast and crew. Whity, a mixture of Euro-western and American South melodrama, was badly received by the critics and became Fassbinder's biggest flop. The film was neither picked up for theatrical release, nor was there interest for broadcasting it on television. As a result, Whity was only seen as its premiere. It remained unavailable until the 1990s, when it began to be screened; now, like almost all of Fassbinder's films, it is available on DVD.

==== Rio das Mortes (1971) ====
A whimsical comedy, Rio das Mortes follows two young men without prospects who try to raise money to realize their dream of finding a buried treasure in Peru using a map of the Rio das Mortes. The girlfriend of one of them finds the notion stupid and wants to put a stop to it, but eventually the two friends find a patroness to finance their adventure.

Based on an idea by Volker Schlondorff, Rio das Mortes was shot in January 1970 following Why Does Herr R. Run Amok?, but was broadcast on television a year later in February 1971. The film feels casually constructed; the humor is bland and the plot has been criticized for its sloppiness and poor character development. Rio das Mortes is best remembered for a scene unrelated to the plot, as the girlfriend, played by Schygulla, dances to Elvis Presley's "Jailhouse Rock" on the jukebox in the company of an oafish leather-jacketed youth, played by Fassbinder.

==== Pioneers in Ingolstadt (1971) ====
Pioneers in Ingolstadt (Pioniere in Ingolstadt) was adapted from an eponymous play by Marieluise Fleißer written in 1927. It follows two young women whose lives are transformed when army engineers (the pioneers of the title) arrive to their town to build a bridge. One of the women flirts from soldier to soldier, but her friend falls in love only to be abandoned.

Shot in November 1970, Pioneers in Ingolstaldt was commissioned for television. Fassbinder wanted to bring the plot from the 1920s to contemporary Germany, but the producers, fearing to offend the German army, refused. A compromise did not satisfy any of the parties, and midway through the project Fassbinder lost interest in it. The film suffered as a consequence, and it ranks among Fassbinder's weakest films.

The tensions and bitterness that had surrounded the making of Whity led Fassbinder to dismantle the collective project of the Anti-Theater as a production company. Instead, he founded his own production company: Tango films. Pioneers in Ingolstadt, although broadcast before the theatrical release of Beware of a Holy Whore, was the last film made by Fassbinder during his formative period. In the following year, 1971, Fassbinder shot only one film: The Merchant of Four Seasons.

==== Beware of a Holy Whore (1971) ====
Beware of a Holy Whore was based, like many of Fassbinder's films, on a personal experience – the shooting of his earlier film, the revisionist western Whity (1970). The film shows an egomaniacal director, beset by a stalled production, temperamental actors, and a frustrated crew. When asked what the movie he is making is about, he replies: "brutality." The film ends with a typical Fassbinder-esque irony, as the crew gang up on the director. Beware of a Holy Whore marked the end of Fassbinder's avant-garde period. It presented such an embittered and radical self-critique that his future films would have to be quite different from the ones made before. After spinning out ten films in not much more than a year (this film was shot only a few months after Whity) in a frenzied burst of creativity, his anti-film anti-theater drive seemed to conclude.

=== German melodramas (1971–1976) ===
After Pioneers in Ingolstadt, Fassbinder took an eight-month break from filmmaking. During this time, he turned for a model to Hollywood melodrama, particularly the films German émigré Douglas Sirk made in Hollywood for Universal-International in the 1950s: All That Heaven Allows, Magnificent Obsession and Imitation of Life. Fassbinder was attracted to these films not only because of their entertainment value, but also for their depiction of various kinds of repression and exploitation.

==== The Merchant of Four Seasons (1971) ====
Fassbinder scored his first domestic commercial success with The Merchant of Four Seasons (Händler der vier Jahreszeiten, 1971). The film portrays a married couple who are fruit sellers. Hans faces rejection from his family after he violently assaults his wife for not bending to his will. She leaves him, but after he suffers a heart attack they reunite, though he now has to employ other men. His restricted ability to function leads him to ponder his own futility. He literally drinks himself to death.

The Merchant of Four Seasons uses melodrama as a style to create critical studies of contemporary German life for a general audience. It was Fassbinder's first effort to create what he declared he aspired to: a cinematic statement of the human condition that would transcend national boundaries as the films of Michelangelo Antonioni, Ingmar Bergman and Federico Fellini had done. It is also his first realization of what he learned from Sirk: that people, however small they may be, and their emotions, however insignificant they may seem, could be big on the movie screen.

==== The Bitter Tears of Petra von Kant (1972) ====
Loneliness is a common theme in Fassbinder's work, together with the idea that power becomes a determining factor in all human relationships. His characters yearn for love, but seem condemned to exert an often violent control over those around them. A good example is The Bitter Tears of Petra von Kant (Die bitteren Tränen der Petra von Kant, 1972) which was adapted by Fassbinder from his plays. The title character is a fashion designer who lives in a self-created dreamland and the action is restricted mostly to her lavish bedroom. After the failure of her second marriage, Petra falls hopelessly and obsessively in love with Karin, a cunning young working-class woman who wants a career in modeling. The model's exploitation of Petra mirrors Petra's extraordinary psychological abuse of her silent assistant, Marlene. Fassbinder portrays the slow meltdown of these relationships as inevitable, and his actresses (there are no men in the film) move in a slow, trance-like way that hints at a vast world of longing beneath the beautiful, brittle surface.

==== Jail Bait (1972) ====
Jail Bait (Wildwechsel, 1972), also known as Wild Game, is a bleak story of teenage angst, set in industrial northern Germany during the 1950s. As in many other of his films, Fassbinder analyses lower middle class life with characters who, unable to articulate their feelings, bury them in inane phrases and violent acts. Love turns into a power struggle of deception and betrayal. The story centers on Hanni, a precocious 14-year-old schoolgirl who starts a relationship with Franz, a 19-year-old worker in a chicken processing plant. Their romance faces the opposition of the girl's conservative parents. Franz is sentenced to nine months in prison for having sex with a minor. When he is released on probation, they continue their relationship and Hanni becomes pregnant. Afraid of her father's anger, she persuades Franz to kill him. When Franz returns to prison for this murder, Hanni tells him that their child died at birth and that their love was "only physical".

Originally made for German television, Jail Bait was based on a play by Franz Xaver Kroetz, who violently disagreed with Fassbinder's adaptation, calling it pornographic. The luridness of its theme furthered the controversy.

==== World on a Wire (1973) ====
His only science fiction film, World on a Wire (Welt am Draht, 1973), was a departure for Fassbinder. An adaptation of the pulp sci-fi novel Simulacron-3 by Daniel F. Galouye, it was made as a two-part, 205-minute production for television using 16mm film stock during a hiatus from the lengthy production of Effi Briest and in the same year as Martha and Ali: Fear Eats the Soul.

A story of realities within realities, World on a Wire follows a researcher, working at the institute of cybernetics and future science, who begins to investigate the mysterious death of his mentor. He falls deep into the cover up behind a computer capable of creating an artificial world with units living as human beings unaware that their world is just a computer projection. Made in contemporary Paris, the film was stylistically inspired by Jean-Luc Godard's Alphaville (1965) and in its theme of artificial humans wanting to reach real life anticipated Ridley Scott's Blade Runner (1982).

==== Ali: Fear Eats the Soul (1974) ====
Fassbinder first gained international success with Fear Eats the Soul (Angst essen Seele auf, 1974). This film was shot in 15 days in September 1973 with a very low budget, ranking among Fassbinder's quickest and cheapest. Nevertheless, the impact on Fassbinder's career and in overseas release remains cemented as a great and influential work. It won the International Critics Prize at Cannes and was acclaimed by critics everywhere as one of 1974's best films.

Fear Eats the Soul was loosely inspired by Sirk's All That Heaven Allows (1955). It details the vicious response of family and community to a lonely aging white cleaning lady who marries a muscular, much younger black Moroccan immigrant worker. The two are drawn to each other out of mutual loneliness. When their relationship becomes known, they experience various forms of hostility and public rejection. Gradually, their relationship is tolerated, not out of real acceptance, but because those around the good-hearted old lady realize their ability to exploit her is threatened. As the external pressures over the couple begin to subside, internal conflicts surface.

==== Martha (1974) ====
Fassbinder's main characters tend to be naifs, either men or women, who are rudely, sometimes murderously, disabused of their romantic illusions. Shot on 16mm film and made for television, Martha (1974) is a melodrama about cruelty in a traditional marriage.

The plot focuses on the title character, a spinster librarian. Soon after the death of her father while on vacation in Rome, Martha meets a wealthy civil engineer, who sweeps her off her feet. They encounter each other again at a wedding in her hometown of Constance and soon marry. However, their married life becomes an exercise for her husband to express his sadism and for Martha to endure her masochism. Her husband shows his desire for her violently, leaving marks on her body. He obsessively controls her life, her diet, her taste in music and her interests, until she is confined to their house. Martha's initially positive wish to be liked by her oppressive and abusive husband pushes her to such an extreme that she becomes deranged, leading to her own permanent physical paralysis.

==== Effi Briest (1974) ====
Effi Briest was Fassbinder's dream film and the one in which he invested the most work. While he normally took between nine and 20 days to make a film, this time it required 58 shooting days, dragged out over two years. The film is a period piece adapted from Theodor Fontane's classic novel of 1894, concerning the consequences of betrayed love. Set in the closed, repressive Prussian society of the Bismarck era, the film paints a portrait of a woman's fate completely linked to an unbending and utterly unforgiving code of social behavior. The plot follows the story of Effi Briest, a young woman who seeks to escape her stifling marriage to a much older man by entering into a brief affair with a charming soldier. Six years later, Effi's husband discovers her affair with tragic consequences.

The film served as a showpiece for Fassbinder's muse and favorite actress Hanna Schygulla, whose detached acting style fitted the roles the director created for her. Fassbinder made her a star, but artistic differences while making Effi Briest created a split that lasted for some years, until Fassbinder called her back to take the role of Maria Braun.

==== Like a Bird on a Wire (1975) ====
Like a Bird on a Wire (Wie ein Vogel auf dem Draht) is a forty-minute television production featuring Brigitte Mira, the main actress in Fear eats the Soul, singing cabaret songs and love ballads from the 1940s and 1950s. Between songs, she drinks and talks about her husbands. The title is borrowed from Leonard Cohen's song "Bird on the Wire", with which the program ends.

Fassbinder considered this project "an attempt to do a show about the Adenauer era. For us it certainly wasn't entirely successful. But the film does reveal the utter repulsiveness and sentimentality of the time" he explained.

==== Fox and His Friends (1975) ====
Many of Fassbinder's films deal with homosexuality, in keeping with his interest in characters who are social outsiders, but he drew away from most representations of homosexuals in films. In an interview at the 1975 Cannes Film Festival, Fassbinder said about Fox and His Friends: "It is certainly the first film in which the characters are homosexuals, without homosexuality being made into a problem. In films, plays or novels, if homosexuals appear, the homosexuality was the problem, or it was a comic turn. But here homosexuality is shown as completely normal, and the problem is something quite different, it's a love story, where one person exploits the love of the other person, and that's the story I always tell".

In Fox and His Friends (Faustrecht der Freiheit, 1974) a sweet but unsophisticated working-class homosexual wins the lottery and falls in love with the elegant son of an industrialist. His lover tries to mold him into a gilt-edged mirror of upper-class values, all the while appropriating Fox's lottery winnings for his own ends. He ultimately destroys Fox's illusions, leaving him heartbroken and destitute.

Fassbinder worked within the limits of Hollywood melodrama, though the film is partially based on the plight of his then lover Armin Meier (to whom the film is dedicated). The film is notable for Fassbinder's performance as the unlucky Fox, in a self-directed starring role.

Fox and His Friends has been deemed homophobic by some and overly pessimistic by others. The film's homosexuals are not, surprisingly, any different from the film's equally lecherous heterosexuals. The film's pessimism is far outweighed by Fassbinder's indictment of Fox as an active participant in his own victimization, a familiar critique found in many of the director's films.

==== Mother Küsters Goes to Heaven (1975) ====
In Mother Küsters' Trip to Heaven (Mutter Küsters Fahrt zum Himmel), a melodrama, Emma Küsters becomes the center of media and political attention after her husband, a factory worker, killed his supervisor or his supervisor's son and then himself when lay offs were announced. The film drew on both Sirk's melodramas and Weimar-era workers' films, connecting the genres to tell a political coming-of-age story about Mother Küsters, who seeks to understand what led to her husband's actions and how to respond. The film is very critical of the era's politics and media, as the people to whom Emma Küsters turns all exploit her and her experience. The media, communists, anarchists and even her own family members all take advantage of Mother Küsters's tragedy to advance their own agendas.

==== Fear of Fear (1975) ====
Made for German television, Fear of Fear (Angst vor der Angst) is a psychological drama about a middle-class housewife, locked into a dull life with a distracted husband, two small children, and openly hostile in-laws. She becomes addicted to valium and alcohol overwhelmed by an irrational anxiety and fear of her inexorable descent into madness.

Fear of Fear is similar in theme to Martha, which also portrays the effect of a dysfunctional marriage on an oppressed housewife. The central role was again played by Margit Carstensen.

==== I Only Want You to Love Me (1976) ====
I Only Want You to Love Me (Ich will doch nur, daß ihr mich liebt, 1976) tells the story of Peter, a construction worker in jail for manslaughter. His life is recounted in a series of flashbacks. A hard working man, Peter spends his spare time building a house for his cold unloving parents. He marries and finds a job in another city, but in his desperate yearning for affection he tries to buy the love of those around him with expensive gifts which soon makes him fall into a spiral of debt. When he sees his own unrequited love for his parents reflected during an argument in a bar, he kills a man who serves as a proxy for his father.

The film was made for television and shot during a pause while making Satan's Brew. Based on a true account taken from For Life, a book of interviews edited by Klaus Antes and Christiane Erhardt, it was Fassbinder's personal reflections on childhood and adolescence.

==== Satan's Brew (1976) ====
In a time of professional crisis, Fassbinder made Satan's Brew (Satansbraten, 1976) a bleak amoral comedy that pays homage to Antonin Artaud's theatre of cruelty. Stylistically far from the melodramas that made him known internationally, Satan's Brew gave way to a new phase in his career. In Satan's Brew, a neurotic poet suffering from writer's block struggles to make ends meet while dealing with a frustrated long suffering wife, a half witted brother and various prostitutes and masochist women who drift in and out of his life. He convinces himself to be the reincarnation of the gay romantic poet Stefan George (1868–1933) after he plagiarizes his poem The Albatros.

=== International films (1976–1982) ===
Enthusiasm for Fassbinder's films grew quickly after Fear Eats the Soul. Vincent Canby paid tribute to Fassbinder as "the most original talent since Godard". In 1977, the New Yorker Theater in Manhattan held a Fassbinder Festival.

However, as enthusiasm for Fassbinder grew outside of Germany, his films still failed to impress the native audience. At home, he was better known for his television work and for his open homosexuality. Coupled with the controversial issues of his films – terrorism, state violence, racism, sexual politics – it seemed that everything Fassbinder did provoked or offended someone.

After completing in 1978 his last low-budget and very personal ventures (In a Year of 13 Moons and The Third Generation) he would concentrate on making films that were becoming increasingly garish and stylized. However, his TV series Berlin Alexanderplatz was a naturalistic adaptation of the two-volume novel by Alfred Döblin, which Fassbinder had read many times.

==== Chinese Roulette (1976) ====
Chinese Roulette (Chinesisches Roulette) is a gothic thriller with an ensemble cast. The film follows a twelve-year-old crippled girl, Angela, who, due to her parents' lack of affection, arranges an encounter between them with their respective lovers at the family country estate. The film climaxes with a truth-guessing game. The players divide into two teams, which take it in turn to pick out one member of the other side and ask them question about people and objects. The game is played at the suggestion of Angela, who plays against her mother. When the mother asks: "In the Third Reich, what would that person have been?", Angela's answer is "Commandant of the concentration camp at Bergen Belsen"; it is her mother she is describing.

==== The Stationmaster's Wife (1977) ====
There are no happy endings in Fassbinder's films. His protagonists, usually weak men or women with masochistic tendencies, pay a heavy price for their victimization. The Stationmaster's Wife (Bolwieser) is based on a 1931 novel, Bolwieser: The Novel Of a Husband by the Bavarian writer Oskar Maria Graf. The plot follows the downfall of Xaver Bolwieser, a railway stationmaster submitted to the will of his domineering and unfaithful wife, whose repeated infidelities completely ruin Bolwieser's life. Broadcast initially as a two-part television series, The Stationmaster's Wife was shortened to a 112-minute feature film and released in the first anniversary of Fassbinder's death. The film stars Kurt Raab, Fassbinder's close friend whom the director usually cast as a pathetic man. Raab was also set designer of Fassbinder's films until their friendship and professional relationship broke up after making this film.

==== Germany in Autumn (1978) ====
Germany in Autumn (Deutschland im Herbst) is an omnibus film, a collective work of eight German filmmakers including Fassbinder, Alf Brustellin, Volker Schlöndorff, Bernhard Sinkel and Alexander Kluge, the main organizer behind the project. They took a look at the wave of guilt and paranoia that afflicted West Germany's society and its authorities in the months between the kidnapping and murder of industrialist Hanns Martin Schleyer by Red Army Faction members and the deaths of Andreas Baader, Gudrun Ensslin and Jan-Carl Raspe in Stammheim Prison. The film is a document about terrorism and its sociopolitical aftermath. It begins with Schleyer's wake, a segment filmed by Alexander Kluge and Volker Schlöndorff, and it ends with the tumultuous joint funeral of Baader, Ensslin, and Raspe in Stuttgart.

==== Despair (1978) ====
Fassbinder made three films in English, a language in which he was not proficient: Despair (1978), Lili Marleen (1980) and Querelle (1982). All three films have international actors and are very ambitious, yet each faced artistic and commercial problems. Despair is based upon the 1936 novel of the same name by Vladimir Nabokov, adapted by Tom Stoppard and featuring Dirk Bogarde. It was made on a budget of 6,000,000 DEM, exceeding the total cost of Fassbinder's first 15 films.

Despair – A Journey into the Light (Despair – Eine Reise ins Licht) tells the story of Hermann Hermann, an unbalanced Russian émigré and chocolate magnate, whose business and marriage have both grown bitter. The factory is close to bankruptcy, and his vulgar wife is chronically unfaithful. He hatches an elaborate plot to take a new identity in the belief it will free him of all his worries. The story of Hermann's descent into madness is juxtaposed against the rise of National Socialism in the Germany of the 1930s.

==== In a Year of Thirteen Moons (1978) ====
In a Year of Thirteen Moons (In einem Jahr mit 13 Monden, 1978) is Fassbinder's most personal and bleakest work. The film follows the tragic life of Elvira, a transsexual formerly known as Erwin. In the last few days before her suicide, she decides to visit some of the important people and places in her life. In one sequence, Elvira wanders through the slaughterhouse where she worked as Erwin, recounting her history amid the meat-hooked corpses of cattle whose slit throats rain blood onto the floor. In another scene, Elvira returns to the orphanage where she was raised by nuns and hears the brutal story of her childhood. Fassbinder's camera tracks the nun (played by his mother) telling Elvira's story; she moves with a kind of military precision through the grounds, recounting the story in blazing detail, unaware that Elvira had collapsed and can no longer hear it.

In a Year of Thirteen Moons was explicitly personal, a reaction to his former lover Armin Meier's suicide. In addition to writing, directing, and editing, Fassbinder also designed the production and worked as the cameraman. When the film played in the New York Film Festival in October 1979, critic Vincent Canby (who championed Fassbinder's work in the United States) wrote, "Its only redeeming feature is genius."

==== The Marriage of Maria Braun (1979) ====
With The Marriage of Maria Braun (Die Ehe der Maria Braun), his greatest success, Fassbinder finally attained the popular acceptance he sought with German audiences. The title character is an ambitious and strong-willed woman separated from her husband towards the end of World War II. The plot follows Maria Braun's steady rise as a successful businesswoman during the Adenauer era. Maria's dream of a happy life with her husband remains unfulfilled. Her professional achievements are not accompanied by personal happiness. The film, constructed in the Hollywood tradition of "women's pictures" presenting a woman overcoming hardships, serves also as a parable of the West Germany economic miracle embodied in the character of Maria Braun. Her story of manipulation and betrayal parallels Germany's spectacular postwar economic recovery in terms of its cost in human values.

The film was the first part of a trilogy centered on women during the post-war "economic miracle" which was completed with Lola (1981) and Veronika Voss (1982).

==== The Third Generation (1979) ====
The economic success of The Marriage of Maria Braun allowed Fassbinder to pay his debts and to embark on a personal project, The Third Generation (Die Dritte Generation, 1979), a black comedy about terrorism. Fassbinder found financial backing for this film difficult to acquire and it was ultimately made on a small budget and borrowed money. As he did with In a Year of Thirteen Moons, Fassbinder worked again as the film's cameraman.

The film concerns a group of aspiring terrorists from leftist bourgeois backgrounds who kidnap an industrialist during carnival season unaware that they have been manipulated by the capitalist and the authorities whose hidden agenda is for terrorism to create a demand for security hardware and to gain support for harsher security measures. The actions of the ineffectual cell of underground terrorists are overlaid with a soundtrack filled with newscast, voiceovers, music and gibberish. The political theme of the film aroused controversy.

==== Berlin Alexanderplatz (1980) ====
Returning to his explorations of German history, Fassbinder finally realized his dream of adapting Alfred Döblin's 1929 novel Berlin Alexanderplatz. A television series running more than 13 hours, with a two-hour coda (released in the U.S. as a 15-hour feature), it was the culmination of the director's inter-related themes of love, life, and power.

Berlin Alexanderplatz centers on Franz Biberkopf, a former convict and minor pimp, who tries to stay out of trouble but is dragged down by crime, poverty and the duplicity of those around him. His best friend, Reinhold, makes him lose an arm and murders Franz' prostitute girlfriend, Mieze. The love triangle of Franz, Reinhold and Mieze is staged against the rising tide of Nazism in Germany. The film emphasized the sadomasochist relationship between Biberkopf and Reinhold stressing its homoerotic nature. Fassbinder had read the book at age 14; later claiming that it helped him survive a "murderous puberty". The influence of Döblin's novel can be seen in many of Fassbinder's films most of whose protagonists are named Franz, some with the surname Biberkopf like the naïve working class lottery winner in Fox and His Friends, who is played by Fassbinder. He also took the pseudonym of Franz Walsch for his work as editor on his own films: Walsch was an oblique homage to director Raoul Walsh.

==== Lili Marleen (1981) ====
Fassbinder took on the Nazi period with Lili Marleen, an international co production, shot in English and with a large budget. The script was vaguely based on the autobiography of World War II singer Lale Andersen, The Sky Has Many Colors. The film is constructed as a big, tear-jerking Hollywood melodrama in its depiction of the unfulfilled love story between a German variety singer separated by the war from a Swiss Jewish composer. Central to the story is the song that gives the film its title.

Fassbinder presents the period of Nazi Germany as a predictable development of German history that was staged as spectacle supported by hate. Filmed with a morbid nostalgia for swastikas, showbiz glitz and as a cloak-and-dagger romance, the main theme of Lili Marleen is the question: is it morally justifiable to survive under National Socialism, as the naïve singer does by having a successful career?

==== Theater in Trance (1981) ====
Theater in Trance is a documentary which Fassbinder shot in Cologne in June 1981 at the "Theaters of the World" Festival. Over scenes from groups such as the Squat Theatre and the Tanztheater Wuppertal Pina Bausch Fassbinder spoke passages from Antonin Artaud as well as his own commentary.

==== Lola (1981) ====
Lola tells the story of an upright, new building commissioner who arrives in a small town. He falls in love with Lola, innocently unaware of the fact that she is a famed prostitute and the mistress of an unscrupulous developer. Unable to reconcile his idealistic image of Lola with reality, the commissioner spirals into the very corruption he had sought to fight out.

==== Veronika Voss (1982) ====
Fassbinder won the Golden Bear at the 32nd Berlin International Film Festival for Veronika Voss. The original German title, Die Sehnsucht der Veronika Voss, translates as "The longing of Veronika Voss". Set in the 1950s, the film depicts the twilight years of the title character, a faded Nazi starlet. A sports reporter becomes enthralled by the unbalanced actress and discovers that she is under the power of a villainous doctor who supplies her with the drugs she craves so long as she can pay the exorbitant fee. Despite the reporter's best attempts, he is unable to save her from a terrible end.

==== Querelle (1982) ====
Fassbinder did not live to see the premiere of his last film, Querelle, based on Jean Genet's novel Querelle de Brest. The plot follows the title character, a handsome sailor who is a thief and hustler. Frustrated in a homoerotic relationship with his own brother, Querelle betrays those who love him and pays them even with murder.

== Personal life ==
Fassbinder had relationships with both men and women. He rarely kept his professional and personal life separate, and was known to cast family, friends and lovers in his films. Early in his career he had a lasting but fractured relationship with Irm Hermann, a former secretary whom he forced to become an actress. Fassbinder usually cast her in unglamorous roles, most notably as the unfaithful wife in The Merchant of Four Seasons and the silent abused assistant in The Bitter Tears of Petra von Kant.

Hermann idolized him, but Fassbinder tormented and tortured her for over a decade. This included domestic violence: "He couldn't conceive of my refusing him, and he tried everything. He almost beat me to death on the streets of Bochum ..." In 1977, Hermann became romantically involved with another man and became pregnant by him. Fassbinder proposed to her and offered to adopt the child; she turned him down.

In 1969, while portraying the lead role in the TV film Baal under the direction of Volker Schlöndorff, Fassbinder met Günther Kaufmann, a black Bavarian actor who had a minor role in the film. Despite the fact that Kaufmann was married and had two children, Fassbinder fell madly in love with him. The two began a turbulent affair which ultimately affected the production of Baal. Fassbinder tried to buy Kaufmann's love by casting him in major roles in his films and buying him expensive gifts.

Kaufmann relished the attention and became more demanding. Fassbinder bought him four Lamborghinis over the period of a year; Kaufmann wrecked one and sold the others if they failed to meet his expectations. The relationship came to an end when Kaufmann became romantically involved with composer Peer Raben. After the end of their relationship, Fassbinder continued to cast Kaufmann in his films, albeit in minor roles. Kaufmann appeared in 14 of Fassbinder's films, with the lead role in Whity (1971).

Although he claimed to be opposed to matrimony as an institution, in 1970 Fassbinder married Ingrid Caven, an actress who regularly appeared in his films. Their wedding reception was recycled in the film he was making at that time, The American Soldier. Their relationship of mutual admiration survived the complete failure of their two-year marriage. "Ours was a love story in spite of the marriage", Caven explained in an interview, adding about her former husband's sexuality: "Rainer was a homosexual who also needed a woman. It's that simple and that complex." The three most important women of Fassbinder's life, Irm Hermann, Ingrid Caven and Juliane Lorenz, his last partner, were not disturbed by his romantic and sexual involvement with men.

In 1971, Fassbinder began a relationship with El Hedi ben Salem, a Moroccan Berber who had left his wife and five children the previous year, after meeting him at a gay bathhouse in Paris. Over the next three years, Salem appeared in several Fassbinder productions. His best-known role was as Ali in Ali: Fear Eats the Soul (1974). Their three-year relationship was punctuated with jealousy, violence and heavy drug and alcohol use. Fassbinder finally ended the relationship in 1974, due to Salem's chronic alcoholism and tendency to become violent when he drank. Shortly after the breakup, Salem stabbed three people (none fatally) in Berlin and had to be smuggled out of the city. Salem eventually made his way to France where he was arrested and imprisoned. He hanged himself while in custody in 1977. News of Salem's suicide was kept from Fassbinder for years. He eventually found out about his former lover's death shortly before his own death in 1982 and dedicated his last film, Querelle, to Salem.

Fassbinder's next lover was Armin Meier. Meier was a near-illiterate former butcher who had spent his early years in an orphanage. He also appeared in several Fassbinder films in this period. A glimpse into their troubled relationship can be seen in Fassbinder's episode for Germany in Autumn (1978). Fassbinder ended the relationship in April 1978. During the week of Fassbinder's birthday (31 May), Meier deliberately consumed four bottles of sleeping pills and alcohol in the kitchen of the apartment he and Fassbinder had previously shared. His body was found a week later.

In the last four years of Fassbinder's life, his companion was Juliane Lorenz (born 1957), the editor of his films during the last years of his life. She can be seen in a small role as the film producer's secretary in Veronika Voss. According to Lorenz, they considered getting married but never did so. Although they were reported as drifting apart in his last year, an accusation Lorenz has denied, they were still living together at the time of his death.

== Controversies ==
Media scandals and controversies ensured that in Germany, Fassbinder was frequently in the news, making calculatedly provocative remarks in interviews. His work often received mixed reviews from the national critics, many of whom only began to take him seriously after the foreign press had hailed him as a major director.

There were frequent exposés of his lifestyle in the press, and attacks on all sides from the groups his films offended. His television series Eight Hours Don't Make a Day was cut from eight to five episodes after pressure from conservatives. The playwright Franz Xaver Kroetz sued over Fassbinder's adaptation of his play Jail Bait, alleging that it was obscene. Lesbians and feminists accused Fassbinder of misogyny (in presenting women as complicit in their own oppression) in his 'Women's Pictures'. The Bitter Tears of Petra von Kant has been cited by some feminist and gay critics as both homophobic and sexist.

Gay critics also criticized Fox and His Friends for not positively depicting homosexuality in bourgeois society, feeling Fassbinder had betrayed them. Conservatives attacked him for his association with the far-left. Marxists said he had sold out his political principles in his depictions of left-intellectual manipulations in Mother Küsters' Trip to Heaven and of a late-blooming terrorist in The Third Generation. Berlin Alexanderplatz was moved to a late-night television slot amid widespread complaints that it was unsuitable for children. The most heated criticism came for his play Trash, the City and Death, whose scheduled performance at the Theater am Turm in Frankfurt was cancelled early in 1975 amid accusations of antisemitism. In the turmoil, Fassbinder resigned from his directorship of that prestigious theater complex, complaining that the play had been misinterpreted. The play is about an unscrupulous and very greedy Jewish businessman in Frankfurt who ruthlessly uses German guilt over the Holocaust to make himself rich. Though published at the time, and quickly withdrawn, the play was not performed until five years after Fassbinder's death by Thieves Theatre in 1987 at ABC No Rio.

== Death ==
By the time he made his last film, Querelle (1982), Fassbinder was consuming significant quantities of drugs and alcohol. On the night of 9–10 June 1982, Wolf Gremm, director of the film Kamikaze 1989 (1982), which starred Fassbinder, was staying in his apartment. Early that evening, Fassbinder retired to his bedroom. He was working on notes for a future film, Rosa L, based on the life of Polish-German revolutionary socialist Rosa Luxemburg. Fassbinder was watching television while reading when, shortly after 1 am, he received a phone call from his friend and assistant Harry Baer. At 3:30 am, when Juliane Lorenz arrived home, she heard the noise of the television in Fassbinder's room, but she could not hear him snoring. Though not allowed to enter the room uninvited, she went in, and discovered his lifeless body with a cigarette still between his lips. A thin ribbon of blood trickled from one nostril.

Fassbinder died from an overdose of cocaine and barbiturates. The notes for Rosa L were found next to his body. His remains were interred at Bogenhausener Friedhof in Munich.

== Filmography ==
Selected credits:

- Love Is Colder Than Death (1969)
- Katzelmacher (1969)
- Gods of the Plague (1970)
- Why Does Herr R. Run Amok? (1970)
- The American Soldier (1970)
- The Niklashausen Journey (1970)
- Baal (1970)
- Rio das Mortes (1970)
- Mathias Kneissl (1971)
- Whity (1971)
- Beware of a Holy Whore (1971)
- The Merchant of Four Seasons (1972)
- The Bitter Tears of Petra von Kant (1972)
- Eight Hours Don't Make a Day (1972–1973)
- The Tenderness of Wolves (1973)
- World on a Wire (1973)
- Ali: Fear Eats the Soul (1974)
- Martha (1974)
- Effi Briest (1974)
- Fox and His Friends (1975)
- Mother Küsters' Trip to Heaven (1975)
- Shadow of Angels (1976)
- I Only Want You to Love Me (1976)
- Satan's Brew (1976)
- Chinese Roulette (1976)
- The Stationmaster's Wife (1977)
- Germany in Autumn (1978)
- Despair (1978)
- In a Year of 13 Moons (1978)
- The Marriage of Maria Braun (1979)
- The Third Generation (1979)
- Berlin Alexanderplatz (1980)
- Lili Marleen (1981)
- Lola (1981)
- Veronika Voss (1982)
- Kamikaze 1989 (1982, posthumous, actor only)
- Querelle (1982, posthumous, final role as an actor)

== Plays ==
- 1965: Nur eine Scheibe Brot (1995, Volkstheater Wien as part of the Bregenzer Festspielen)
- 1966: Tropfen auf heiße Steine (1985, Theaterfestival München; filmed in 2000 by François Ozon as Gouttes d'eau sur pierres brûlantes)
- 1968: Katzelmacher (Action-Theater in Munich, filmed by Fassbinder 1969; received Gerhart-Hauptmann-Preis)
- 1968: Der amerikanische Soldat (Antiteater in Munich, filmed by Fassbinder 1970)
- 1969: Preparadise sorry now (based on the case of Myra Hindley and Ian Brady, Antiteater in München)
- 1969: Anarchie in Bayern (Antiteater in Munich)
- 1969: Gewidmet Rosa von Praunheim (Antiteater in Munich)
- 1969: Das Kaffeehaus (based on Carlo Goldoni's La bottega del caffè, Schauspielhaus Bremen. Filmed by Fassbinder 1970)
- 1969: Werwolf (in collaboration with Harry Baer's Antitheather in Berlin)
- 1970: Das brennende Dorf (based on Fuente Ovejuna by Lope de Vega, Schauspielhaus Bremen)
- 1971: Blut am Hals der Katze (Antiteater in Nürnberg)
- 1971: Die bitteren Tränen der Petra von Kant (Deutsche Akademie der Darstellenden Künste or Experimenta in Frankfurt am Main. Filmed by Fassbinder 1972)
- 1971: Bremer Freiheit (based on the case of Gesche Gottfried, Schauspielhaus Bremen. Filmed by Fassbinder 1972)
- 1973: Bibi (based on the play Bibi - Seine Jugend in drei Akten by Heinrich Mann, Theater Bochum)
- 1975: Der Müll, die Stadt und der Tod (German premiere in 2009 at the Theater an der Ruhr in Mülheim; filmed in 1976 as Schatten der Engel by Daniel Schmid)
