= Peer Raben =

German composer, director and actor (1940–2007)

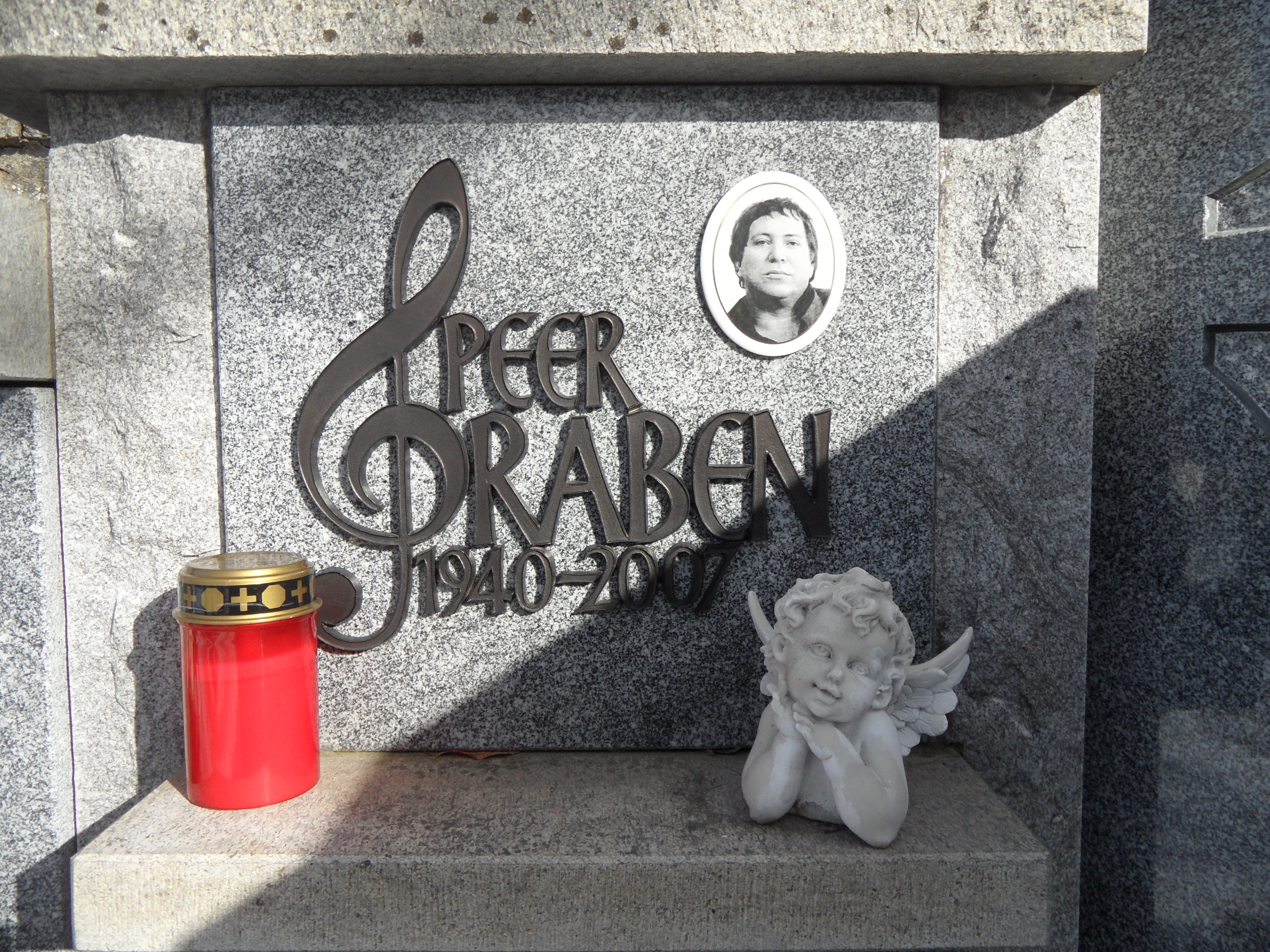
- Raben's tombstone
- Born: Wilhelm Rabenbauer; 3 July 1940; Viechtafell, Bavaria, Germany
- Died: 21 January 2007 (aged 66); Mitterfels, Germany
- Occupation: Composer

Peer Raben (born Wilhelm Rabenbauer; 3 July 1940 – 21 January 2007) was a German composer who worked with German filmmaker Rainer Werner Fassbinder.

== Early and personal life ==
Raben was born in Viechtafell, Bavaria, and attended Musische Gymnasium Straubing. Raben was Fassbinder's lover for a short time when they shared an apartment with Irm Hermann. He died of cancer in Mitterfels, Bavaria, Germany.

== Career ==
In 1966, Raben, together with several others, founded the Action Theatre in Munich, which led to the Anti Theatre in 1968, where he was active as writer, composer and director. In 1969 and 1970 he produced Fassbinder’s first films. After working on a film of his own (Die Ahnfrau), he concentrated on composing for theatre and films.

He directed three films himself: Die Ahnfrau - Oratorium nach Franz Grillparzer (1971), Adele Spitzeder (1972) and Heute spielen wir den Boß (1981), for which he also composed the music.

In addition to Fassbinder, Raben composed music for Robert van Ackeren, Barbet Schroeder, Daniel Schmid, Bernhard Sinkel, Peter Zadek, Doris Dörrie, Hansgünther Heyme, Ulrike Ottinger, Werner Schroeter, Tom Toelle, Dan Polsby, Percy Adlon, Wong Kar-wai and Sergej Stanojkovski.

In 2006 he was awarded the Lifetime Achievement Award from the World Soundtrack Academy.
