= Lilo Pempeit =

German actress and translator

- Born: Liselotte Irmgard Pempeit; 6 October 1922; Free City of Danzig (now Gdańsk, Poland)
- Died: 7 May 1993 (aged 70); Munich, Germany
- Other names: Liselotte Eder
- Occupations: Actress, translator
- Years active: 1966–1982
- Notable work: Angst essen Seele auf, Die Ehe der Maria Braun, Berlin Alexanderplatz
- Spouse(s): Helmut Fassbinder (m. 1945; div. 1951); Wolff Eder (m. 1959)
- Children: Rainer Werner Fassbinder

Lilo Pempeit (born Liselotte Irmgard Pempeit; 6 October 1922 – 7 May 1993) was a German film and stage actress and literary translator. She is best known for her recurring appearances in the films of her son, New German Cinema director Rainer Werner Fassbinder, and for her early German translations of Truman Capote’s prose.

== Early life and education ==
Pempeit was born in the Free City of Danzig (today Gdańsk, Poland) on 6 October 1922. During the final years of the Second World War she studied history and German philology at LMU Munich, later describing herself as “a refugee on the run who hid in libraries.”

In Munich she met medical officer Helmut Fassbinder, whom she married in 1945; their only child, Rainer Werner, was born the same year in Bad Wörishofen.

== Career ==
After her 1951 divorce, Pempeit supported herself as a freelance translator of English and French fiction, beginning with Capote’s story collection Baum der Nacht for Limes Verlag in 1957, work that established her reputation in German publishing. By the late 1960s, she also held a bookkeeping post at Munich’s Society for Radiation Research (today part of Helmholtz Zentrum München) while assisting her son’s cooperatively run Antiteater troupe.

Pempeit’s screen debut came in Fassbinder’s short Das kleine Chaos (1966), and between 1969 and 1982 she acted in twenty of his films and television productions, usually cast as waitresses, neighbours or mothers whose understated presence grounded his melodramas in everyday realism. Her spare, undemonstrative style drew critical notice in Why Does Herr R. Run Amok? (1969) and Ali: Fear Eats the Soul (1974), and she later appeared in international festival successes such as The Marriage of Maria Braun (1978) and Veronika Voss (1982).

Following Fassbinder’s death in 1982 Pempeit ended her acting career, remarking that “the roles had always belonged to him.”

== Filmography ==
- 1967– Das kleine Chaos
- 1970– Götter der Pest
- 1970– Warum läuft Herr R. Amok?
- 1971– Rio das Mortes
- 1971– Händler der vier Jahreszeiten
- 1972– Bremer Freiheit: Frau Geesche Gottfried – Ein bürgerliches Trauerspiel
- 1972– Oma und Gregor
- 1973– Welt am Draht
- 1974– Fontane Effi Briest
- 1974– Martha
- 1974– Nora Helmer
- 1974– Angst essen Seele auf
- 1975– Faustrecht der Freiheit
- 1975– Mutter Küsters' Fahrt zum Himmel
- 1975– Angst vor der Angst
- 1976– Satansbraten
- 1977– Bolwieser (TV version)
- 1978– Despair – Eine Reise ins Licht
- 1978– Deutschland im Herbst
- 1978– In einem Jahr mit 13 Monden
- 1978– Die Ehe der Maria Braun
- 1979– Die dritte Generation
- 1980– Berlin Alexanderplatz (14-part miniseries)
- 1980– Lili Marleen
- 1980– Das Äußere und das Innere und das Geheimnis der Angst vor dem Geheimnis
- 1980– Mein Traum vom Traum des Franz Biberkopf von Alfred Döblin – Ein Epilog
- 1980– Wissen ist Macht und Morgenstund hat Gold im Mund
- 1980– Merke – einen Schwur kann man amputieren
- 1980– Eine Liebe, das kostet immer viel
- 1982– Die Sehnsucht der Veronika Voss
- 1983– Bolwieser (theatrical cut)
- 1988– Das andere Ufer
- 2015– Fassbinder – Lieben ohne zu fordern (archive footage)

== Personal life ==
Following her 1959 marriage to Munich journalist Wolff Eder, she published under the name Liselotte Eder and continued translating, often collaborating with her husband. In 1986, she founded the non-profit Rainer Werner Fassbinder Foundation to administer her son’s intellectual property.

Pempeit died of cancer in Munich on 7 May 1993 at the age of 70.
