= Volker Spengler =

German actor (1939–2020)

- Born: 16 February 1939; Bremen, Germany
- Died: 8 February 2020 (aged 80); Berlin, Germany
- Years active: 1966–2004 (film and TV)

Volker Spengler ([ˈfɔlkɐ ˈʃpɛŋlɐ]; 16 February 1939 – 8 February 2020) was a German stage and film actor. Spengler was best known to international audiences as a member of director Rainer Werner Fassbinder's acting ensemble, including his role as the transsexual Erwin/Elvira of Fassbinder's In a Year of 13 Moons (1978). Spengler appeared in about 40 film and television productions between 1966 and 2004, also working with other directors such as Christoph Schlingensief and Volker Schlöndorff. On stage, he performed at Berlin's Volksbühne and with the Berliner Ensemble.

== Life ==
Born in Bremen, Spengler began a commercial apprenticeship at age 18. From 1959 to 1961, he attended the Schauspielschule in Salzburg and the Vienna Reinhardt-Seminar. He played boulevard theatre from 1965, alongside Heinz Erhardt in Stuttgart, with Ida Ehre in Hamburg, and with Fritz Rémond in Frankfurt. Spengler was discovered for the Schiller Theater by director Fritz Kortner in 1967.

Spengler played in many films by Rainer Werner Fassbinder. His most noted role with him was the transsexual Erwin/Elvira in In a Year of 13 Moons in 1978. Spengler played the lead role with Ingrid Caven, Eva Mattes and Elisabeth Trissenaar. He participated in productions of Pina Bausch's Tanztheater in Wuppertal.

Spengler appeared in about 40 film and television productions between 1966 and 2004, working also with directors such as Christoph Schlingensief and Volker Schlöndorff. In Schlöndorff's Der Unhold, he played Hermann Göring, alongside Gottfried John and John Malkovich.

With Schlingensief, he played on stage at Berlin's Volksbühne, such as in Rosebud. He was a long-standing veteran at the Volksbühne and also the Berliner Ensemble. On stage, he worked with directors such as Frank Castorf, Peter Palitzsch and René Pollesch. In Heiner Müller's last production, Brecht's Der aufhaltsame Aufstieg des Arturo Ui with the Berliner Ensemble, he played Giri together with Martin Wuttke.

His trademark was his raspy voice. His longtime partner Bob died on 20 April 1994 of AIDS. Spengler died on 8 February 2020, eight days shy of his 81st birthday.

== Filmography ==
Spenglers's films include:

- Fassbinder
  - Mother Küsters' Trip to Heaven (Mutter Küsters' Fahrt zum Himmel, 1975)
  - Satan's Brew (Satansbraten, 1976)
  - Chinese Roulette (Chinesisches Roulette, 1976)
  - The Stationmaster's Wife (TV film, 1977)
  - Despair (1978)
  - In a Year of 13 Moons (In einem Jahr mit 13 Monden, 1978)
  - The Marriage of Maria Braun (Die Ehe der Maria Braun, 1979)
  - The Third Generation (Die dritte Generation, 1979)
  - Berlin Alexanderplatz (TV miniseries, 1980)
  - Veronika Voss (Die Sehnsucht der Veronika Voss, 1982)
- Ticket of No Return (Bildnis einer Trinkerin, 1979)
- Bang! You're Dead! (1987)
- Schlingensief
  - 100 Years of Adolf Hitler: The Last Hour in the Führerbunker (1989)
  - The German Chainsaw Massacre (Das deutsche Kettensägenmassaker, 1991)
  - The 120 Days of Bottrop (1997)
- Schlöndorff
  - The Ogre (Der Unhold, 1996)
- Off Beat (Kammerflimmern, 2004)
