= The Marriage of Maria Braun =

1979 film by Rainer Werner Fassbinder

- Theatrical poster
- Directed by: Rainer Werner Fassbinder
- Written by: Peter Märthesheimer; Pea Fröhlich; Rainer Werner Fassbinder
- Produced by: Michael Fengler
- Starring: Hanna Schygulla; Klaus Löwitsch; Ivan Desny; Gisela Uhlen
- Cinematography: Michael Ballhaus
- Edited by: Franz Walsch; Juliane Lorenz
- Music by: Peer Raben
- Production companies: Albatros Filmproduktion; Westdeutscher Rundfunk; Trio Film
- Distributed by: United Artists
- Release dates: 20 February 1979 (Berlinale); 23 March 1979 (West Germany)
- Running time: 120 minutes
- Country: West Germany
- Languages: German; English
- Budget: 1.975 million DM
- Box office: $5.6 million $1.1 million (US/Canada)

The Marriage of Maria Braun (German: Die Ehe der Maria Braun) is a 1979 West German drama film directed by Rainer Werner Fassbinder. The film stars Hanna Schygulla as Maria, who marries German soldier Hermann Braun during World War II. The couple spend over a decade apart due to forces largely beyond Maria's control. To survive in postwar Germany, Maria becomes a sex worker, a wealthy industrialist's mistress, and eventually a ruthless capitalist during the German economic miracle, while still asserting her loyalty to Hermann.

The Marriage of Maria Braun was one of Fassbinder's more successful works and shaped the image of the New German Cinema. It has also been acclaimed by many critics as one of Fassbinder's most profound films. It is the first installment of his BRD Trilogy, followed by Lola (1981) and Veronika Voss (1982).

== Plot ==
During an Allied bombing raid in 1943, Maria Berger and Hermann Braun get married. The next day, Hermann returns to the Eastern front. When the war ends, Maria is told that Hermann died. She clings to his memory.

The war devastates Germany's economy. To support herself and her family, Maria takes a job in a seedy underground bar for Allied soldiers. Her boss asks her for a doctor's medical certificate, tipping off her longtime doctor that the job involves sex work. Due to the psychological strain of seeing his female patients forced into sex work, the doctor becomes a morphine addict.

Maria starts a relationship with Bill, a Black American soldier she meets at the bar. Although Maria's main motive is to get Bill to financially support her family, and she refuses to marry him out of devotion to Hermann, they develop a mutual affection, and she gets pregnant. Hermann unexpectedly returns from a Soviet POW camp and catches Bill in bed with Maria. Maria rushes to him, but he coldly slaps her. Bill and Hermann start fighting. To break up the brawl, Maria smashes a beer bottle over Bill's head, killing him. Hermann takes the fall for Maria and is sent to prison, leaving Maria alone again. Maria and Bill's child is stillborn.

On the train home from her doctor, after seducing a train conductor to get into a first-class train car, Maria charms a wealthy passenger, textile industrialist Karl Oswald. Oswald offers Maria a job as his personal advisor.

Back in her apartment, Maria tells her mother and roommates that she now needs to move into her own apartment. In voiceover, Konrad Adenauer publicly says that West Germany will not rearm.

At the prison, Maria tells Herman about taking the job with Oswald so she can build a house for the two of them, promising Hermann, "My time's just beginning."

To support the family, Maria falls back on her cunning and cynicism. She becomes Oswald's mistress, translator, and personal secretary. Despite the misgivings of Oswald's lawyer, Senkenberg, she displays ruthless business instincts, using her sexual wiles to close deals and charm a union organizer. During a celebratory dinner, Senkenberg angrily complains that Oswald deserted Germany and his firm during the war and came back only after Germany lost. Still, he stays with the firm.

Although Maria's financial situation improves, she grows concerned about her lack of agency. She pushes Oswald to recognize her as a valuable businesswoman. She tells Hermann that she welcomed the affair with Oswald, explaining that her emotional coldness is an asset in modern Germany, although her facade occasionally cracks. After Oswald meets Hermann in prison without Maria's knowledge, Hermann emotionally withdraws from her. Upon his release, Hermann emigrates to Canada, telling Maria that he still loves her and that they will reunite at a later date.

Maria buys a large house in the suburbs. As Maria is devastated by Hermann's disappearance, she starts treating people rudely, including the hired help, her family, her coworkers, and Oswald. She refuses to let her family move in with her in the house. Oswald dies three years later, prompting Maria to go on a bender. Adenauer announces the rearmament of Germany.

Hermann shows up at Maria's house on the day West Germany plays Hungary in the 1954 World Cup Final. Maria lights a cigarette at the stove but blows out the flame instead of turning off the gas, causing a gas leak. Hermann remains emotionally withdrawn, despite Maria's efforts at romance. They remind each other that they have both sacrificed for each other. Senkenberg arrives to give Maria Oswald's will-reading. She expects to inherit a great deal but receives only half of the estate. In the will, Oswald reveals that he promised Hermann the other half if Hermann agreed to let the terminally ill Oswald spend the rest of his life with Maria. Maria lights a cigarette, igniting the gas leak from the stove and killing herself and Hermann; whether it was an accident or a suicide is left ambiguous. Senkenberg discovers her corpse just as Germany becomes world champion.

After the end credits, ominous photo negatives of postwar West German Chancellors (Adenauer, Erhard, Kiesinger, and Schmidt) are shown. (Note: Fassbinder omitted Willy Brandt from the ending montage, explaining that while "fascist technocrats" prevented Brandt from reforming Germany, "he still differs from the other chancellors". In addition, the film opens with a photo of Adolf Hitler, which is promptly blown up by an Allied bomb.)

== Cast ==
- Hanna Schygulla as Maria Braun
- Klaus Löwitsch as Hermann Braun
- Ivan Desny as Karl Oswald
- Gisela Uhlen as Mother
- Elisabeth Trissenaar as Betti Klenze
- Gottfried John as Willi Klenze
- Hark Bohm as Senkenberg
- George Byrd as Bill
- Claus Holm as Doctor
- Günter Lamprecht as Hans Wetzel
- Anton Schiersner as Grandpa Berger
- Sonja Neudorfer as Red Cross nurse
- Volker Spengler as Train conductor
- Isolde Barth as Vevi
- Lilo Pempeit as Mrs. Ehmke
- Bruce Low as American at the conference
- Günther Kaufmann as American on the train
- Karl-Heinz von Hassel as Prosecuting attorney
- Hannes Kaetner as Justice of the Peace
- Kristine de Loup as Notary

== Production ==
=== Writing and pre-production ===
The idea for The Marriage of Maria Braun can be traced to Fassbinder's collaboration with Alexander Kluge on the unrealized television project The Marriage of our Parents (Die Ehen unserer Eltern), which was developed after the critical success of the omnibus film Germany in Autumn. Fassbinder worked on a draft screenplay with Klaus-Dieter Lang and Kurt Raab and presented it in the summer of 1977 to his longtime collaborator Peter Märthesheimer, who at that time was working as a dramaturge at the Bavaria Film Studios. In August 1977, Märthesheimer and his partner Pea Fröhlich, a professor of psychology and pedagogics, were commissioned to write a screenplay based on the draft. Although it was Märthesheimer's and Fröhlich's first screenplay, their knowledge of Fassbinder's works allowed them to match his characteristic style and structure. Fassbinder changed only a few details in their screenplay, including some dialogue and the ending. Instead of committing suicide via a car accident, Maria dies in a gas explosion, leaving it unclear whether it was intentional.

The film's producer was Fassbinder's longtime collaborator Michael Fengler and his production company Albatros Filmproduktion. Fengler planned to start shooting the film in the first half of 1978, as Fassbinder's next project Berlin Alexanderplatz was scheduled for June. Fassbinder was embroiled in a controversy over his stage play Der Müll, die Stadt und der Tod and was not ready to start shooting the film, so he withdrew to Paris, where he worked on the screenplay for Berlin Alexanderplatz. Fengler was dreaming of an international star cast for the film. On his suggestion, Fassbinder and Fengler visited Romy Schneider and asked her to play Maria. Due to Schneider's alcohol problems, fickleness, and demands, the role was then given to Hanna Schygulla, her first collaboration with Fassbinder in several years. Yves Montand also showed interest in the film, but wanted to play Hermann and not, as Fassbinder and Fengler suggested, Oswald. As the role of Hermann was already promised to Klaus Löwitsch, Montand was ultimately not offered a role.

=== Production ===
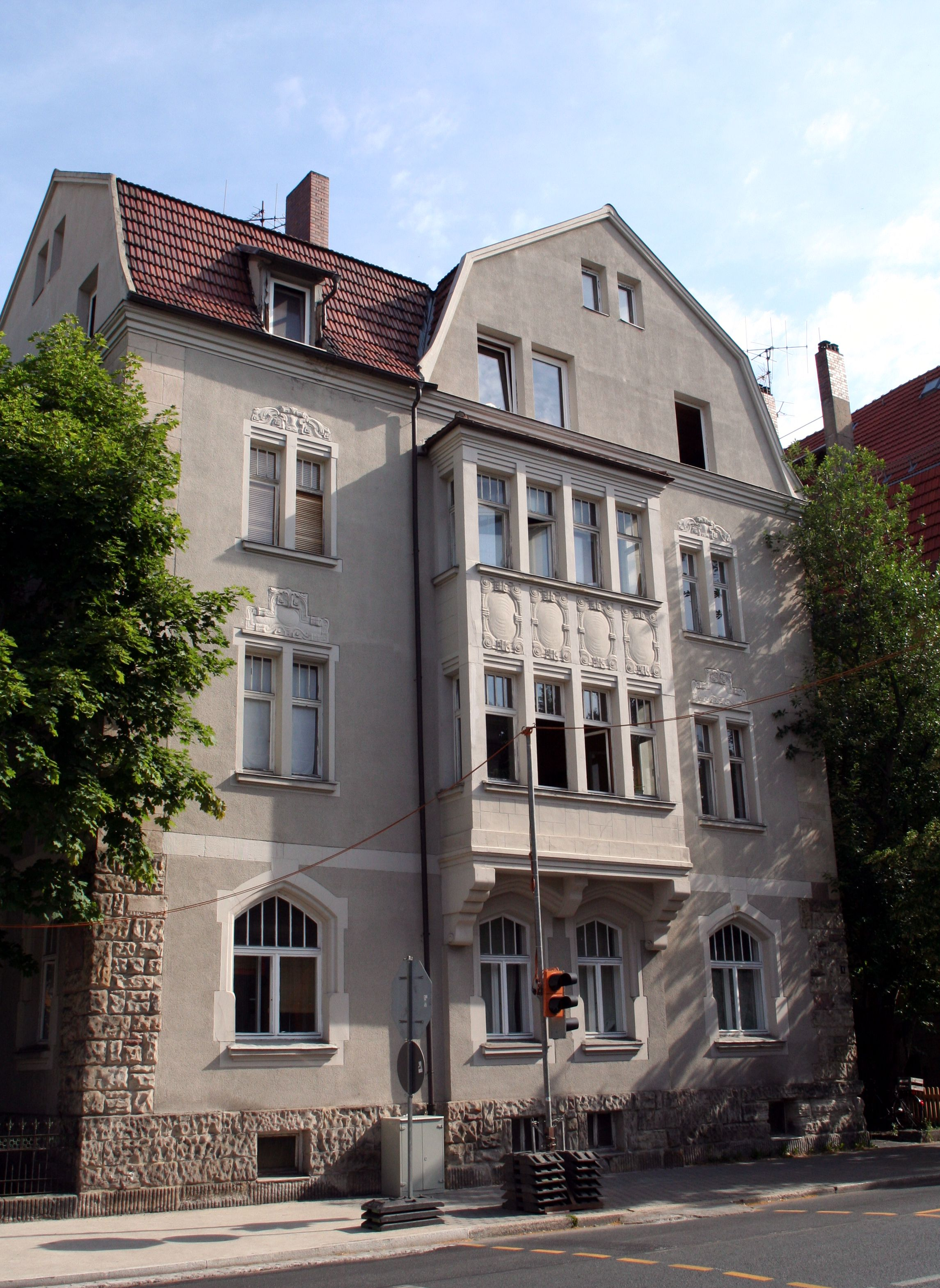
Mohrenstraße 1 in Coburg was one of the locations where The Marriage of Maria Braun was shot.

From the start, the financing of The Marriage of Maria Braun was precarious. Albatros Filmproduktion contributed only 42,500 DM, the public broadcaster Westdeutscher Rundfunk 566,000, the German Federal Film Board 400,000, and the distributor 150,000. This forced Fengler to find another financing partner. He offered Hanns Eckelkamp's Trio-Film a share in the film in December 1977. Fengler had promised Fassbinder's Tango-Film 50% of the film profits, but by offering Trio-Film a share in the film, he effectively oversold the rights; only 15% remained with Fassbinder. Fassbinder subsequently called Fengler a gangster and litigation against Fengler continued even after Fassbinder's death.

Shooting began in January 1978 in Coburg. Bad-tempered and quarrelsome, Fassbinder shot the film during the day and worked on the Berlin Alexanderplatz script at night. To sustain this schedule he consumed large quantities of cocaine, supplied by the production manager Harry Baer and the actor Peter Berling. According to Berling this was the main reason the film went over budget, as the cash for the cocaine was coming from Fengler.

In February the budget was reaching 1.7 million DM, and the two most expensive scenes, the explosions at the beginning and at end of the film, had not yet been shot. By this time Fassbinder had learned about Fengler's deal with Eckelkamp and the overselling of the film rights. He felt deceived and broke with Fengler. He demanded the status of co-producer, obtained an injunction against Fengler and Eckelkamp, fired most of the film crew, ended the shooting in Coburg at the end of February, and moved to Berlin, where he shot the last scenes. The biographer Thomas Elsaesser called the production of the film "one of Fassbinder's least happy experiences" and Berlin "one of the decisive self-destructive episodes in Rainer's life".

== Distribution and reception ==
=== Release ===
While also preparing for the production of Berlin Alexanderplatz, Fassbinder worked with film editor Juliane Lorenz on the editing and post-production of The Marriage of Maria Braun. The failure of Despair at the 1978 Cannes Film Festival spurred him to prepare an answer print overnight and to present the film on 22 May to German film producers in a private screening. The screening, attended by Horst Wendlandt, Sam Waynberg, Karl Spiehs, Günter Rohrbach, and Filmverlag der Autoren's majority shareholder Rudolf Augstein, among others, was a success. Eckelkamp invested a further 473,000 DM to pay the film production's debts and became the sole owner of the rights to the film. He negotiated a distribution deal with United Artists, outmaneuvering the Filmverlag der Autoren, which usually distributed Fassbinder's films.

Hoping that The Marriage of Maria Braun might be successful at the 1979 Berlin International Film Festival, Eckelkamp started a marketing campaign and decided to release the film theatrically in March. Commissioned by Eckelkamp, the author Gerhard Zwerenz novelized the film. It was published in several weekly installments in the magazine Der Stern over three months beginning in March, increasing public interest in the film. The film's official premiere was on 20 February at the 29th Berlin International Film Festival. The West German theatrical release was on 23 March. At the Berlin festival, Hanna Schygulla won the Silver Bear for Best Actress, which did not satisfy Fassbinder, who expected to win the Golden Bear.

=== Contemporary reception ===
German film critics responded very favorably to the film, praising its combination of artistic value with mass appeal. In the weekly newspaper Die Zeit Hans-Christoph Blumenberg called it "the most accessible (and thus most commercial) and mature work of the director". Karena Niehoff wrote in the Süddeutsche Zeitung that The Marriage of Maria Braun "is a charming and even amusing film, at the same time extraordinarily artful, artificial and full of twists and turns".

Many critics praised Schygulla. In the Süddeutsche Zeitung Gottfried Knapp wrote that Fassbinder gave her a magnificent opportunity to display her talent, and that her character, emotions, charm, and energy had an enormous effect. Foreign critics also praised Schygulla. In The New Yorker, David Denby called her "an improbable cross between Dietrich and Harlow". She was the runner-up for the National Society of Film Critics Award for Best Actress that year, losing to Sally Field.

François Truffaut wrote in 1980 in Cahiers du cinéma that with this film Fassbinder "has broken out of the ivory tower of the cinephiles", that the film is "an original work of epic and poetic qualities" influenced by Godard's Contempt, Brecht, Wedekind, and Douglas Sirk, and that its idea of a man who looks on men and women with equal fondness is particularly touching. The French critic Jean de Baroncelli discussed the film's allegorical qualities in Le Monde, writing that it presents Maria with "shining simplicity" as an allegory of Germany, "a character who wears flashy and expensive clothes but has lost her soul".

Roger Ebert added the film to his Great Movies collection.

The New York Times placed the film on its Best 1000 Movies Ever list.

=== Commercial success and aftermath ===
The Marriage of Maria Braun was also a commercial success. From its release until October 1979 more than 900,000 tickets were sold in West Germany, and it ran for up to 20 weeks in some theaters. In West Germany alone the film grossed more than $3 million. In the same year of its German release the distribution deals for 25 countries were negotiated. In August 1981 the film was Fassbinder's first to run in East German theaters. In the United States, the film was the highest-grossing German film ever and grossed $2.6 million.

The film was not the official German submission to the 51st Academy Awards for Best Foreign Language Film. Instead Hans W. Geißendörfer's The Glass Cell was chosen. Almost a year later the film was nominated for a Golden Globe Award for Best Foreign Language Film at the 37th Golden Globe Awards, but this was overshadowed by the success of Volker Schlöndorff's The Tin Drum at the 52nd Academy Awards. The commercial success of The Marriage of Maria Braun strengthened Fassbinder's negotiation position in his subsequent projects. He received a financing agreement for one of his favorite projects, based on Pitigrilli's novel Cocaine, and was able to increase the budget for Berlin Alexanderplatz. Several German commercial film producers expressed interest in making films with him. Luggi Waldleitner produced Fassbinder's Lili Marleen with Schygulla in the main role. Horst Wendlandt produced the two other films in the BRD Trilogy, Lola and Veronika Voss. Fassbinder's success also allowed him to realize his last project, Querelle, which was co-financed by Gaumont.

As Fengler had oversold the rights to the film, Fassbinder's profit share was an open question. Eckelkamp saw himself as the sole owner of all rights, but sent Fassbinder 70,000 DM in 1982 to appease him. After Fassbinder's death, his mother and heiress Liselotte Eder revived his claims, but Eckelkamp was unsympathetic. In the course of legal proceedings Eckelkamp was ordered in 1986 to disclose the film's finances to the newly founded Rainer Werner Fassbinder Foundation. Eckelkamp's Trio Film disclosed a budget of almost 2 million DM, additional marketing costs of 1 million and a net profit of 1 million. When Trio-Film was ordered to pay Fassbinder's heirs 290,000 DM, Eckelkamp refused. At the Rainer Werner Fassbinder Foundation's request, Trio Film had to declare bankruptcy in 1988. In the course of the continuing legal proceedings, the Oberlandesgericht Düsseldorf certified in 1990 that Fassbinder was not a co-producer of the film. The Federal Court of Justice upheld that ruling, but also ruled that Fassbinder's heirs were entitled to a share of the film's profits. Today the Rainer Werner Fassbinder Foundation owns all rights to the film.
