= Peter Märthesheimer =

Peter Märthesheimer (Kiel, 9 July 1937 – Berlin, 18 June 2004) was a German screenwriter, producer and author.

== Early years ==
Märthesheimer studied economics and sociology in Frankfurt am Main. From 1964 onwards he was editor and dramaturge at WDR for ten years, then at Bavaria Film until 1981. In 1994 he became professor for screenplay and dramaturgy at the Film Academy Baden-Württemberg. He was also a dramaturgy consultant at the University of Television and Film Munich and the BKM.

In collaboration with Pea Fröhlich he wrote the screenplays for the Rainer Werner Fassbinder films The Marriage of Maria Braun and Veronika Voss. He was a producer for the film Martha. The TV series Eight Hours Don't Make a Day and Berlin Alexanderplatz he cooperated with Fassbinder. In collaboration with Wolfgang Menge he created the sensational television productions Das Millionenspiel and Smog as well as the unconventional family series Ein Herz und eine Seele.

In 2000 he published the novel Ich bin die Andere. In the book he dealt with the subject of multiple personalities.

His written legacy can be found in the archive of the Academy of Arts in Berlin.

== Filmography ==
=== Production ===
- 1969: The Arsonists (TV film)
- 1970: Mein schönes kurzes Leben (TV film)
- 1970: Das Millionenspiel (TV film)
- 1971: Das Messer (TV miniseries)
- 1972/73: Eight Hours Don't Make a Day (TV series, 5 episodes)
- 1973: Smog (TV film)
- 1973: World on a Wire (TV film)
- 1973: Ein Herz und eine Seele (TV series, 3 episodes)
- 1974: Martha (TV film)
- 1975: Fear of Fear (TV film)
- 1975: Lina Braake
- 1976: I Only Want You to Love Me (TV film)
- 1978: The Other Smile (TV film)
- 1978: Despair
- 1978: Amore (TV film)
- 1978: Game of Losers
- 1980: Berlin Alexanderplatz (TV miniseries)
- 1981: Taunusrausch (TV film)
- 1982: The Confessions of Felix Krull (TV miniseries)

=== Screenplay ===
- 1967: Tag der offenen Tür (short TV film; with Günter Herburger)
- 1979: The Marriage of Maria Braun
- 1981: Lola
- 1981: Looping
- 1982: Veronika Voss
- 1985: The Cop and the Girl
- 1987: The Cry of the Owl (TV film)
- 1989: Radiofieber (TV miniseries)
- 1991: Haus am See
- 1991: The Indecent Woman
- 1994: Weihnachten mit Willy Wuff (TV film)
- 1995: Weihnachten mit Willy Wuff: Eine Mama für Lieschen (TV film)
- 1996: Deutschlandlied (TV film)
- 1996: Tatort: Das Mädchen mit der Puppe (TV series)
- 1997: Weihnachten mit Willy Wuff: Mama braucht einen Millionär (TV film)
- 2002: Was ist bloß mit meinen Männern los? (TV film)
- 2002–2005: Bloch (TV series)
- 2006: I Am the Other Woman

== Audio drama ==
- Krupp oder die Erfindung des bürgerlichen Zeitalters (Production: WDR 2002)
- Lenz oder Das richtige Leben (Production: WDR 2005)

== Awards ==
- 1973: Special honour at the Adolf Grimme Preis for Eight Hours Don't Make a Day
- 1978: Goldene Kamera
- 1981: Honourable Mention at the Adolf Grimme Preis für Berlin Alexanderplatz (along with Günter Rohrbach)
- 2000: Mara-Cassens-Preis of the Literature House Hamburg for Ich bin die Andere
