= In a Year of 13 Moons =

1978 West German film

- Theatrical release poster
- German: In einem Jahr mit 13 Monden
- Directed by: Rainer Werner Fassbinder
- Written by: Rainer Werner Fassbinder
- Produced by: Rainer Werner Fassbinder
- Starring: Volker Spengler; Ingrid Caven; Gottfried John
- Cinematography: Rainer Werner Fassbinder
- Edited by: Rainer Werner Fassbinder; Juliane Lorenz
- Music by: Peer Raben
- Distributed by: Tango-Film; Filmverlag der Autoren
- Release date: 17 November 1978
- Running time: 124 minutes
- Country: West Germany
- Language: German

In a Year of 13 Moons (German: In einem Jahr mit 13 Monden) is a 1978 West German drama film written, produced and directed by Rainer Werner Fassbinder. It stars Volker Spengler, Ingrid Caven, Gottfried John, Elisabeth Trissenaar, Eva Mattes and Günther Kaufmann.

The film was made three months after the suicide of Fassbinder's lover at the time, Armin Meier. There are some real life details from Meier's life that are incorporated into Elvira's character.

== Plot ==
The story takes place in a year with 13 moons, with the following title card shown at the beginning of the movie:

Every seventh year is a year of the moon. People whose lives are strongly influenced by their emotions suffer more intensely from depression in these years. To a lesser degree this is also true of years with 13 moons. When a moon year also has 13 moons, inescapable personal tragedies may occur.

Elvira Weishaupt was a butcher named Erwin, who was happily married, and loved his wife and daughter. Then one day Erwin met Anton Saitz and fell in love with him, but Anton nonchalantly said he would only be interested if Erwin were a woman. Erwin took the statement literally, and gave up his entire life, work and family, and had a sex change operation, becoming Elvira.

But she soon finds out that Anton has moved on and abandoned her, and now she revisits her past life in order to make sense of her new identity, in an effort to put her life back together. In the end, she commits suicide.

== Cast ==
- Volker Spengler as Erwin / Elvira Weishaupt
- Ingrid Caven as Rote Zora
- Gottfried John as Anton Saitz
- Elisabeth Trissenaar as Irene Weishaupt
- Eva Mattes as Marie-Ann Weishaupt
- Günther Kaufmann as J. Smolik
- Lilo Pempeit as Sister Gudrun
- Isolde Barth as Sybille
- Karl Scheydt as Christoph Hacker
- Walter Bockmayer as Soul-Frieda
- Peter Kollek as alcoholic
- Bob Dorsay as city tramp
- Gerhard Zwerenz as Burghard Hauser

== Reception ==
On the review aggregator website Rotten Tomatoes, the film has a score of 76%, based on 17 film critic's reviews. Film critic Jay Scott said "the movie is a relentlessly uncompromising, keening cri de coeur, a movie that has turned a wake into a work of art." He went on to say that "never before has the intense, depressive, claustrophobic interior world of the potential suicide been brought to the screen with such force."

Film critic Vincent Canby wrote it is "not a film to recommend to anyone who isn't familiar with other work by this director; without adequate preparation, the uninitiated movie patron might think he was having a nightmare about a nightmare; the movie is grotesque, arbitrary, sentimental and cold as ice."

Richard Brody commented that "Fassbinder has Elvira revisit the stages of her life with raucous humor and hysterical melodrama, and Volker Spengler throws himself into the role with heartbreaking abandon." In her review for Film Comment, Violet Lucca observed the movie "is elegiac and complex, allowing a panoply of potential readings; it's the most elegant release of grief transfigured into film, embodying its indiscriminate effects."

== See also ==
- Cinema of West Germany
- List of German films of 1978
- List of LGBTQ-related films of 1978
- List of feature films with transgender characters
