= BRD Trilogy =

Three films (1979–1982) by Rainer Werner Fassbinder

The BRD Trilogy (German: BRD-Trilogie) consists of three films directed by Rainer Werner Fassbinder: The Marriage of Maria Braun (1979), Lola (1981) and Veronika Voss (1982). The films are connected in a thematic rather than in a narrative sense. All three deal with different characters (though some actors recur in different roles) and plotlines, but each one focuses on the story of a specific woman in West Germany after World War II. The three letter acronym "BRD" stands for Bundesrepublik Deutschland, the official name of West Germany and of the united contemporary Germany.

== Films ==
=== The Marriage of Maria Braun ===
The Marriage of Maria Braun (1979) begins in the last days of World War II during the rushed marriage ceremony of Maria Braun, after which her husband is sent to battle the advancing Allies. After Maria later hears that he has been killed, she becomes the mistress of an African-American soldier. When Maria's husband unexpectedly returns alive, she kills the soldier in a scuffle, but her husband takes the blame. Maria becomes the self-centered assistant and lover of a wealthy industrialist and a model of post-war recovery.

=== Veronika Voss ===
Veronika Voss (1982) depicts the twilight years of film actress Veronika Voss in stark black-and-white. A sports reporter becomes enthralled by the unbalanced actress and discovers that she is under the power of a villainous doctor who keeps her addicted to opiates in order to steal her wealth. Despite his best attempts, he is unable to save her from a terrible end. The original German title, Die Sehnsucht der Veronika Voss, translates as "The longing of Veronika Voss".

=== Lola ===
Lola (1981) is loosely based on Josef von Sternberg's The Blue Angel and its source novel Professor Unrat by Heinrich Mann. It tells the story of an upright building commissioner, Von Bohm, who comes to a small town. He falls in love with Lola, ignorant of the fact that she is a famed prostitute and the mistress of Shuckert, an unscrupulous developer. Unable to reconcile his idealistic images of Lola with reality, Von Bohm spirals into the very corruption he had sought to fight.

== Background and structure ==
Fassbinder had the idea of making a series of films that focus on West Germany during the "economic miracle" of the 1950s. The main characters are all women, representing different people in different circumstances. Fassbinder developed the original treatments and stories, but Peter Märthesheimer wrote the detailed scripts for the films. He had worked with Fassbinder as a commissioning producer and script editor of some of his TV projects, with the help of his then partner Pea Fröhlich.

The films were shot and released in a slightly different order from their accepted numbering. Maria Braun, released in 1979, is the earliest in terms of both production and the chronology of the plot, beginning in 1945, but became part of the trilogy only retrospectively, when Fassbinder added the caption "BRD 3" to Lola in 1981. Veronika Voss, released a year later, included the caption "BRD 2" and is set in a slightly earlier period than Lola. Fassbinder did not intend the series to end as a trilogy but his plans to make further films in the same mould were cut short by his death.

The Criterion Collection released the trilogy in a DVD box set in September 2003.

== Unifying elements ==
Aside from Fassbinder's intention to make films about West Germany after World War II and during the "economic miracle", there are other threads that tie the three films together. One is the issue of "forgetting the past for the sake of moving to a brighter future". All the films' main characters are trying to overcome their circumstances, largely created by past experiences. Fassbinder depicts West Germany in the 1950s and afterward as attempting to forget its Nazi period, even allowing former Nazi officials to hold political power, and move ahead as a country, regaining international respectability and prestige. The painful past is neither acknowledged nor confronted.

A second parallel is the question of who exactly benefited from West Germany's economic progress. Fassbinder's view was that some Germans advanced during the "economic miracle" but others fell by the wayside. For everyone who has a better life (more wealth, security, and peace), someone else suffers and loses. Veronika Voss is an example of someone who does not benefit, because her acting career was most prominent during the Third Reich. Maria Braun tries to advance economically for her and her husband's sakes, but hurts others in the process and in the end is emotionally distant from her husband and her family. Lola tries to take advantage of economic progress and use her position for advancement, but others who surround her attempt the same, with mixed results.

An additional commonality is the inclusion of African-American soldiers in all three films. In The Marriage of Maria Braun there are two, a gentlemanly soldier who becomes Maria's lover and another who drunkenly accosts her on a train. The latter is played by Günther Kaufmann, who also plays African-American soldiers in the other two films. It is unclear whether the soldier is supposed to be the same person in all three. He can be taken as a representation of the influence of the American occupation on postwar Germany, though the fact that he is African-American could have other implications.

Each film has a distinctive style (especially in its cinematography) to better reflect the characters. The Marriage of Maria Braun appears with much of its color drained. Veronika Voss uses a very rich black and white, similar to film noir or German Expressionist films of the 1920s. Lola is influenced by Josef von Sternberg's The Blue Angel and uses very bold colors in a manner similar to Technicolor.
