= Hanna Schygulla =

German actress and chanson singer (born 1943)

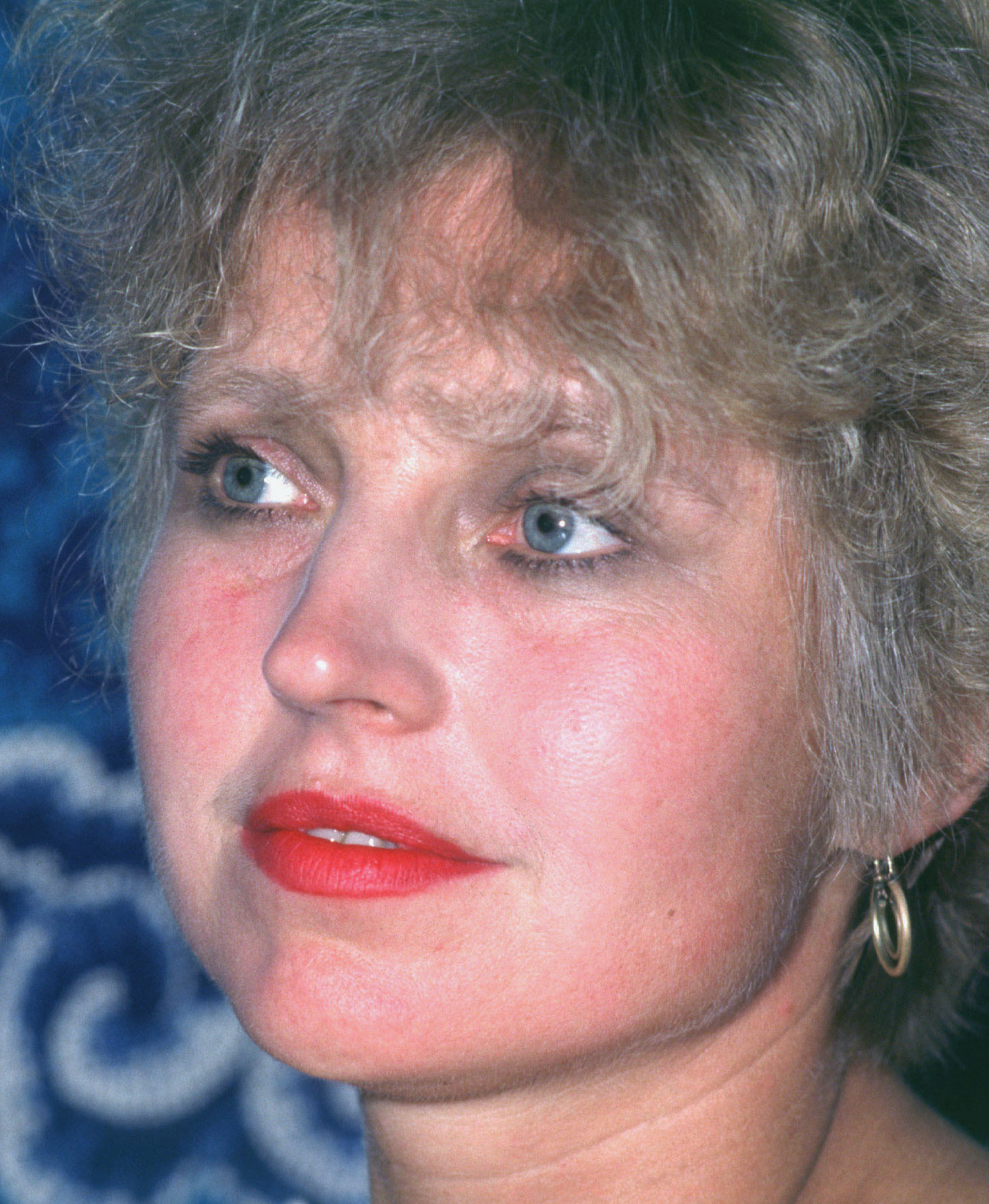
- Schygulla in 1982
- Born: 25 December 1943 (age 82); Königshütte, Silesia (later Chorzów, Poland)
- Occupations: Actress, singer
- Years active: 1968–present

Hanna Schygulla (German: [ˈhana ʃyˈɡʊla]; born 25 December 1943) is a German actress and chanson singer best known for her work with director Rainer Werner Fassbinder. She first worked with Fassbinder in 1965 and became an active participant in the New German Cinema. Schygulla won the 1979 Silver Bear for Best Actress for Fassbinder's The Marriage of Maria Braun, and the 1983 Cannes Film Festival Award for Best Actress for the Marco Ferreri film The Story of Piera.

== Early life ==
Schygulla was born in Königshütte (later Chorzów, Poland) to German parents Antonie (née Mzyk) and Joseph Schygulla. Both the names Schygulla (also spelled Szyguła) and Mzyk are of Polish/Silesian origin. Her father, a timber merchant by profession, was drafted as an infantryman in the German Army and was captured by American forces in Italy, subsequently being held as a prisoner of war until 1948. In 1945, Schygulla and her mother arrived as refugees in Munich, following the expulsion of the majority German-speaking population of Königshütte by Communist Poland. Much later, in the 1960s, Schygulla studied Romance languages and German studies, while taking acting lessons in Munich during her spare time.

== Career ==
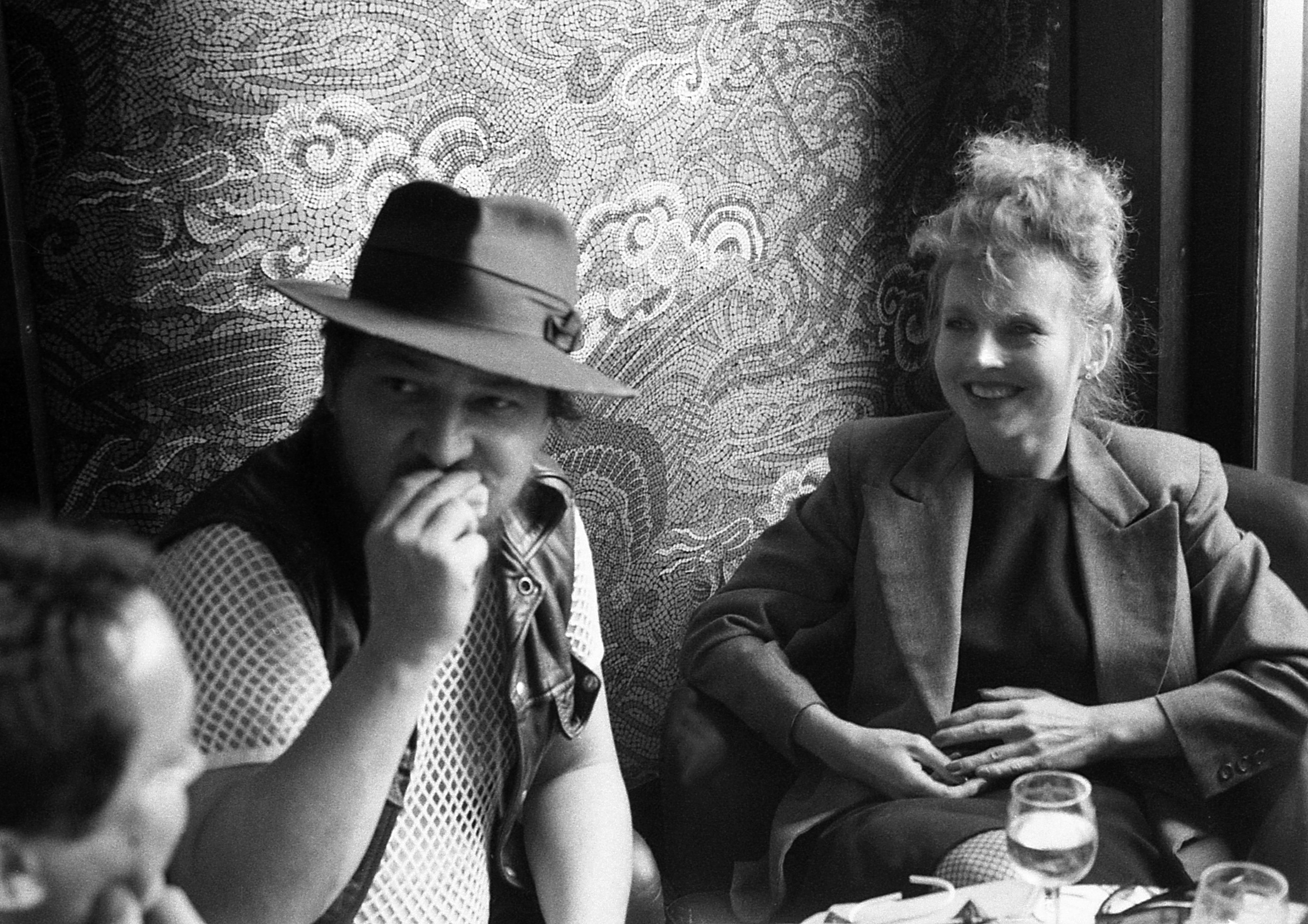
Schygulla with Fassbinder in 1980

Acting eventually became her focus, and she became particularly known for her film work with Rainer Werner Fassbinder. During the making of Effi Briest (1974), an adaptation of a German novel by Theodor Fontane, Fassbinder and Schygulla fell out over divergent interpretations of the character. Another issue for Schygulla was low pay, and she led a revolt against Fassbinder during the making of Effi Briest, shot in September 1972 some time before its commercial release. His response was typically blunt: "I can't stand the sight of your face any more. You bust my balls". They did not work together again for several years until The Marriage of Maria Braun in 1978. The film was entered into the 29th Berlin International Film Festival, where she won the Silver Bear for Best Actress for her performance. In 1980 she acted in Fassbinder's miniseries adaptation of Berlin Alexanderplatz.

Schygulla starred alongside Bruno Ganz in Volker Schlöndorff's Circle of Deceit (1981), and with Isabelle Huppert in Jean-Luc Godard's Passion (1982). She was a member of the jury at the 15th Moscow International Film Festival in 1987.

In the 1990s, she became a Chanson singer. In Juliane Lorenz's documentary film Life, Love and Celluloid (1998), on Fassbinder and related topics, Schygulla performs several songs.

Schygulla appeared in the Béla Tarr film Werckmeister Harmonies (2000), and in VB51 (2002), a performance by the artist Vanessa Beecroft. Five years later, she appeared in the film The Edge of Heaven, directed by Fatih Akın. She also appeared in Rosa von Praunheim's film Fassbinder's Women (2000).

In 2007, she received the Honorary Award from the Antalya Golden Orange Film Festival and in 2010 she received the Honorary Golden Bear from the Berlin Film Festival. She acted in the Alexander Sokurov film Faust (2011) and in the French drama film The Prayer (2018) by Cédric Kahn. It was screened in the main competition section at the 68th Berlin International Film Festival.

Schygulla lived in Paris from 1981 to 2014, then moved to Berlin.

== Filmography ==
- Hunting Scenes from Bavaria (1969), as Paula
- Love is Colder than Death (1969), as Johanna
- Katzelmacher (1969), as Marie
- Kuckucksei im Gangsternest (1969), as Maria
- Gods of the Plague (1970), as Johanna Reiher
- Why Does Herr R. Run Amok? (1970), as Hanna
- The Niklashausen Journey (1970, TV film), as Johanna
- Rio das Mortes (1971, TV film), as Hanna
- Mathias Kneissl (1971), as Mathilde Schreck
- Pioneers in Ingolstadt (1971, TV film), as Berta
- Whity (1971), as Hanna
- Beware of a Holy Whore (1971), as Hanna, actress
- Jakob von Gunten (1971, TV film), as Lisa Benjamenta
- The Merchant of Four Seasons (1972), as Anna Epp / Hans's single sister
- The Bitter Tears of Petra von Kant (1972), as Karin Thimm
- Eight Hours Don't Make a Day (1972–1973, TV miniseries), as Marion Andreas
- Effi Briest (1974), as Effi Briest
- The Wrong Move (1975), as Therese Farner
- The Clown (1976), as Marie
- The Marriage of Maria Braun (1979), as Maria Braun
- The Third Generation (1979), as Susanne Gast
- The Great Runaway (1979, TV miniseries), as Frau Piesch
- Berlin Alexanderplatz (1980, TV miniseries), as Eva
- Lili Marleen (1981), as Willie
- Circle of Deceit (1981), as Ariane Nassar
- That Night in Varennes (1982), as Countess Sophie de la Borde
- Passion (1982), as Hanna
- Antonieta (1982), as Anna
- The Story of Piera (1983), as Eugenia
- Sheer Madness (1983), as Olga
- A Love in Germany (1983), as Paulina Kropp
- The Future is Woman (1984), as Anna
- Peter the Great (1986, TV miniseries), as Catherine Skevronskaya
- The Delta Force (1986), as Ingrid Harding (Stewardess)
- Barnum (1986, TV Film) as Jenny Lind
- Casanova (1987, TV film), as Casanova's Mother
- Forever, Lulu (1987), as Elaine
- Miss Arizona (1988), as Rozsnyai Mici
- The Summer of Miss Forbes (1989, TV film), as Mrs. Forbes
- Abraham's Gold (1990), as Barbara 'Bärbel' Hunzinger
- Aventure de Catherine C. (1990), as Fanny Hohenstein
- Dead Again (1991), as Inga
- Golem, l'esprit de l'exil (1992), as L'Esprit de l'Exil
- Warsaw – Year 5703 (1992), as Stefania Bukowska
- Gibellina, Metamorphosis of a Melody (1992)
- Madame Bäurin (1993), as Tante Agathe
- The Blue Exile (1993), as The Actress
- Golem, le jardin pétrifié (1993), as Michelle
- Aux petits bonheurs (1993), as Lena
- Hey Stranger (1994), as Tania
- A Hundred and One Nights (1995), as La seconde ex-épouse de M. Cinéma
- Pakten (1995), as Ewa Loehwe
- Lea (1996), as Wanda
- Metamorphosis of a Melody (1996), as Spirit of Exile
- Chronique (1997), as La femme du restaurant
- The Girl of Your Dreams (1998), as Magda Goebbels
- Black Out p.s. Red Out (1998), as Martha
- Hanna Schygulla Sings (1999)
- Werckmeister Harmonies (2000), as Tünde Eszter
- Promised Land (2004), as Hanna
- A Quiet Love (2005), as Frau Marx
- Vendredi ou un autre jour (2005), as La dame patronnesse de l'équipage
- Winter Journey (2006), as Martha "Mucky" Brenninger
- The Edge of Heaven (2007), as Susanne / Lotte's mother
- Faust (2011), as Moneylender's 'Wife'
- Avanti (2002), as Suzanne
- Lullaby to My Father (2012)
- Vijay and I (2013), as Will's mother
- The Quiet Roar (2014), as Eva
- Things to come (2014)
- Unless (2016), as Danielle Westerman
- Fortunata (2017), as Lotte
- The Prayer (2018), as Soeur Myriam
- The Mystery of Henri Pick (2019), as Ludmila Blavitsky
- Everything Went Fine (2021)
- Peter von Kant (2022)
- Poor Things (2023), as Martha Von Kurtzroc
- Yunan (2025) as Valeska
