= Karl-Heinz von Hassel =

German actor

- Born: 8 February 1939; Hamburg, Germany
- Died: 19 April 2016 (aged 77); Hamburg, Germany
- Occupation: Actor
- Years active: 1960–2012

Karl-Heinz von Hassel (8 February 1939 – 19 April 2016) was a German actor. He appeared in more than 100 films and television shows between 1960 and 2012.

Born in Hamburg, he trained for a business career and also took acting lessons. From 1960 he made stage appearances at various theatres and from 1966 he appeared regularly on television and he later had significant roles in films directed by Rainer Werner Fassbinder. Hassel was a tall man who was often cast as police officers, but he also portrayed industrial workers.

He died in Hamburg died aged 77 after a short illness.

== Filmography ==
Year	Title	Role	Notes
1960	Faust	Engel Michael	
1968	Mord in Frankfurt	Ehlers, Taxi Driver	TV film
1977	The Stationmaster's Wife	Windegger	TV film
1978	Alcaptar	Kapitän Cuyp	
1979	The Marriage of Maria Braun	Prosecuting counsel	
1979	Das Ding	Bundeswehrkommandant	TV film
1980	Die kleine Figur meines Vaters	Albert Princz	
1981	Lili Marleen	Henkel	
1981	Lola	Timmerding	
1982	Veronika Voss	Asylum doctor	Uncredited
1983	Kiez	Charly	
1983	Due to an Act of God	Gerd Wiechmann	TV film
1986	The Summer of the Samurai	Heidemann	
1986	Manuel	Manuel's Father	
1988	The Vulture Wally	Stromminger	
1993	Just a Matter of Duty	Direktor der Deutschen Bank	
1996	Brennendes Herz	Stabsarzt	
