= Hanns Eckelkamp =

German film producer and businessman (1927–2021)

- Born: 28 February 1927; Münster, Germany
- Died: 5 August 2021 (aged 94); Berlin, Germany
- Occupations: Film producer, businessman
- Notable work: Rosa Luxemburg; Eréndira; The Marriage of Maria Braun

Hanns Eckelkamp (28 February 1927 – 5 August 2021) was a German film producer and founder of Atlas Filmverleih. He produced over 20 films between the 1960s and early 1990s, including three for director Rainer Werner Fassbinder − Satan's Brew, The Marriage of Maria Braun, and Lola. He also formed film distribution companies and a cinema chain.
