= Günter Lamprecht =

German actor (1930–2022)

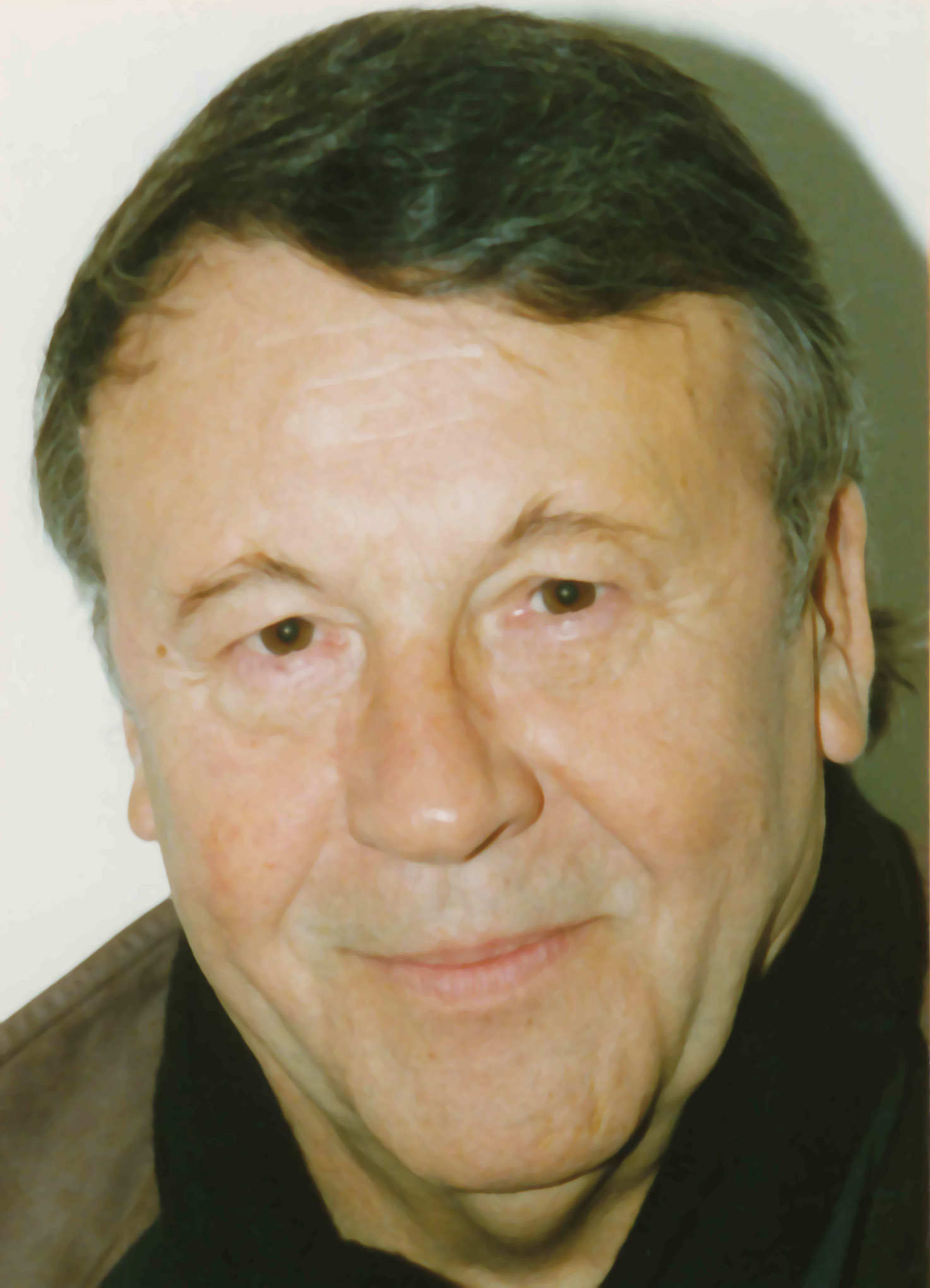
- Born: Günter Hans Lamprecht; 21 January 1930; Berlin, Brandenburg, Prussia, Germany
- Died: 4 October 2022 (aged 92); Bad Godesberg, North Rhine-Westphalia, Germany
- Occupation: Actor
- Years active: 1959–2022

Günter Hans Lamprecht (21 January 1930 – 4 October 2022) was a German film and stage actor, best-known internationally for his leading role in the Fassbinder miniseries Berlin Alexanderplatz (1980) and as a ship captain in the epic war film Das Boot (1981).

== Life and career ==
Lamprecht was born in Berlin, the son of a taxi driver. After training at the Max Reinhardt Seminar, he had his first theatre engagement at the Schauspielhaus Bochum. He joined the Theater Oberhausen in 1959, and remained with them until 1961. His roles there included Stanley Kowalski in A Streetcar Named Desire and John in Gerhart Hauptmann's The Rats.

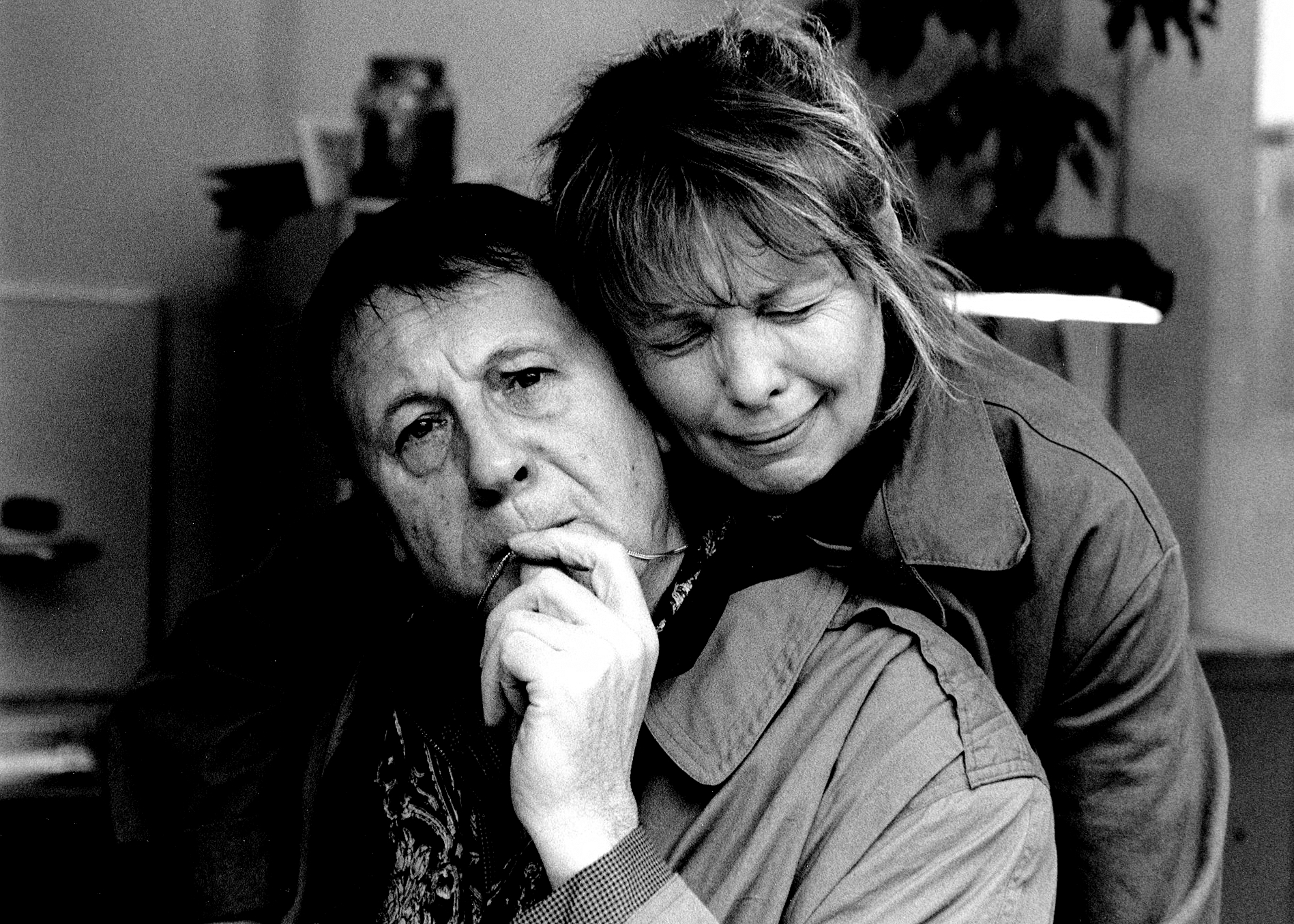
Lamprecht in the television film Der Tod zu Basel (1990), with Hilde Ziegler

Lamprecht began appearing on television in the 1960s. He was cast in the series Kara Ben Nemsi Effendi, which ran from 1973 to 1975. His first film role was in Ottokar Runze's Knife in the Back (1975). In 1976, Lamprecht won the Ernst Lubitsch Award for his performance in Baker's Bread, and in 1978 won the Goldene Kamera award for Best German Actor for Rückfälle. He played the leading role in the 1979 TV movie Frontiers of Darkness (Schattengrenze).

In 1973, filmmaker Rainer Werner Fassbinder cast Lamprecht in his series World on a Wire. He recruited him again for The Marriage of Maria Braun (1979). Fassbinder then gave Lamprecht the lead role of Franz Biberkopf in his acclaimed 1980 miniseries Berlin Alexanderplatz, based on Alfred Döblin's 1929 novel of the same name. Turner Classic Movies wrote of his performance: "Lamprecht was quite extraordinary as the hapless center of gravity as Biberkopf is drawn into and betrayed by Berlin's underworld in the days spanning from the end of WWI to the Nazi era." The role won him Best Actor at the Munich Film Festival, and he came in third place at the American National Society of Film Critics Awards.

Lamprecht had a role in the World War II submarine film Das Boot (1981), playing the captain of the SS Weser, and continued to appear regularly on German television. In the 1990s, he gained further popularity while playing the police commissioner Franz Markowitz in the Berlin episodes of the long-running crime series Tatort. One of his last roles was Paul von Hindenburg in the German TV production Babylon Berlin in 2017.

=== Personal life ===
In 1999, Lamprecht and his partner, actress Claudia Amm, were badly injured in a mass shooting.

Lamprecht's memoirs, And Sadly I'm Still: A Youth in Berlin was published in 2000, where he discusses his experiences in Nazi Germany and the postwar years. His second book, A Hellish Thing, Life was published in 2007. He died on 4 October 2022 in Bad Godesberg at the age of 92.

== Filmography ==
Year	Title	Role	Notes
1960	Die Brücke des Schicksals	Schläger in Tanzbar	
1973	World on a Wire	Fritz Walfang	TV film
1974	Martha	Dr. Herbert Salomon	TV film
1975	The Unguarded House	The Baker	TV film
1975	Stellenweise Glatteis	Karl Maiwald	TV film
1975	Knife in the Back	Schöffe	
1976	Der Stumme	Kahlmann	
1976	Die Ilse ist weg	Kurt	TV film
1976	Baker's Bread	Georg Baum	
1977	Planübung	Bundeswehr Officer	TV film
1977	Rückfälle	Manfred Burger	TV film
1978	The Marriage of Maria Braun	Hans Wetzel	
1979	Frontiers of Darkness	Matthias Berger	TV film
1979	The Great Runaway	Piesch	TV miniseries
1980	Das gefrorene Herz	Gwerder	
1980	Berlin Alexanderplatz	Franz Biberkopf	his magnum opus
1981	Das Boot	Captain of the 'Weser'	
1982	Fleeting Acquaintances	Walter	TV film
1983	Milo Barus, the Strongest Man in the World	Milo Barus	
1984	Love Is Not an Argument	Felix	
1984	What's Up, Chancellor?	Chef	
1984	Ein Mann namens Parvus	Alexander Parvus	TV film
1984	Super	Kuballa	
1984	After Your Decrees	Sergeant Kleinschmidt	
1984	Silent Poison	Philipp Fäsch	TV film
1984	Gnadenlos	Jakob	TV film
1985	Liebfrauen	Philipp	TV film
1985	Die Komplizen	Joseph Lambert	TV film
1985	Red Kiss	Herschel	
1987	Gegen die Regel	Klaus Weber	TV film
1991	Amaurose		
1992	Herzsprung	Vater	
1992	Moebius	Arnold	
1993	Gefährliche Verbindung	Kiefer	TV film
1993	Engel ohne Flügel	Paul	
1997	Berlin – Moskau	Jürgen Schröder	TV film
1997	Friedrich und der verzauberte Einbrecher	Fischer	
1997	Comedian Harmonists	Erik Charell	
1998	Black Ice	Jupp Scholten	TV film
2002	Epstein's Night	Groll / Giesser	
2013	Wir	Sprecher	voice
2017	Babylon Berlin	President Hindenburg	TV series
