= Despair (film) =

1978 film by Rainer Werner Fassbinder

- Theatrical release poster
- Directed by: Rainer Werner Fassbinder
- Screenplay by: Tom Stoppard
- Based on: Despair (1934 novel) by Vladimir Nabokov
- Starring: Dirk Bogarde; Andréa Ferréol; Klaus Löwitsch; Volker Spengler; Bernhard Wicki
- Cinematography: Michael Ballhaus
- Edited by: Juliane Lorenz; Franz Walsch; Reginald Beck
- Music by: Peer Raben
- Production company: Bavaria Atelier; Filmverlag der Autoren; NF Geria Filmgesellshaft; Société française de production
- Distributed by: Filmverlag der Autoren (West Germany); Pari Films (France)
- Release dates: 19 May 1978 (Cannes); May 1978 (West Germany); 20 September 1978 (France)
- Running time: 119 minutes
- Countries: West Germany; France
- Language: English
- Budget: 6 million DM (US$2.6 million)

Despair (German: Despair – Eine Reise ins Licht, lit. 'Despair – A Journey into the Light') is a 1978 psychological historical-drama film directed and co-edited by Rainer Werner Fassbinder, adapted by Tom Stoppard from Vladimir Nabokov's 1934 novel. It stars Dirk Bogarde, Andréa Ferréol, Klaus Löwitsch, Volker Spengler and Bernhard Wicki.

The film follows a wealthy chocolatier in Weimar Germany (Bogarde), who plots to kill and impersonate his own apparent doppelgänger in order to escape his life. The tone of the film, like that of the novel is satiric and ironic. The plot is mostly similar to the novel, although one of the key characters is significantly altered in the adaptation.

Despair was a West German and French co-production, and was Fassbinder's first English-language film. It premiered at the 1978 Cannes Film Festival, where it was nominated for the Palme d'Or. It won in three categories at the 1978 German Film Awards, including Best Director for Fassbinder.

== Plot ==
Hermann Hermann lives in Berlin during the Weimar Republic. A refugee from Soviet Russia, with a Baltic German father and a wealthy Jewish mother, he has inherited a business making chocolates. His Jewish wife Lydia, voluptuous but not intelligent, has an over-close relationship with her bachelor cousin, a painter called Ardalion. As the Great Depression bites and Nazi thugs start targeting Jewish businesses, with his firm becoming less profitable and Germany less hospitable, Hermann starts dreaming of escape. He already has moments of leaving his body, for example to watch himself having sex with his wife, and consults a man he believes to be a Viennese psychiatrist but is in fact a life insurance salesman, who sells Hermann a policy.

After watching a film which features a doppelgänger, he sees an unemployed drifter called Felix, who he decides is his double. Felix, bemused as there is no resemblance between them, goes along with the idea when Hermann promises him a job. The work, it emerges, is to act as Hermann's double for a substantial lump sum.

Hermann is now able to finalize his plan, which is to erase all traces of his unwelcome existence. After getting Ardalion to write a letter that demands money to leave Lydia and go painting in Switzerland, he shows the letter to the insurance salesman as evidence that he is being blackmailed. Then he tells Lydia that he has a troubled twin brother who is contemplating suicide. He will change clothes with his brother, so that the corpse is taken as his, and lie low in Switzerland. When Lydia has been paid the insurance money, she is to join him there.

Having lured Felix to a secluded place in the woods, Hermann dresses Felix up in his own clothes, shaves his facial hair, adjusts his hairstyle and files his nails. Hermann then shoots him dead. Dressed as Felix and with Felix's passport, he goes to a Swiss hotel, where he learns from newspapers that Berlin police are seeking the murderer and suspect it is him. Moving in increasing desperation from village to village, in the end he is spotted by Ardalion and armed police close in. He explains that he is an actor making a film and they must stand aside to let him go on.

== Cast ==
- Dirk Bogarde as Hermann Hermann
- Andréa Ferréol as Lydia Hermann
- Klaus Löwitsch as Felix Weber
- Volker Spengler as Ardalion
- Peter Kern as Müller
- Alexander Allerson as Mayer
- Gottfried John as Perebrodov
- Hark Bohm as Doctor
- Bernhard Wicki as Orlovius
- Adrian Hoven as Inspector Schelling
- Roger Fritz as Inspector Braun
- Y Sa Lo as Elsie
- Armin Meier as Silverman/Braun/Foreman
- Lilo Pempeit as Ms. Schmidt
- Ingrid Caven as Hotel receptionist
- Voli Geiler as Madam
- Isolde Barth as Landlady
- Harry Baer as Innkeeper

== Production ==
The film was Fassbinder's first English language film and his most expensive to date, with a cost of $2.6 million, compared to his earlier films which had budgets below $300,000. Shooting took place at Bavaria Studios and on-location in Munich, Hamburg, Lübeck, and Mölln.

Fassbinder dedicated the film to "Antonin Artaud, Vincent van Gogh and Unica Zürn".

== Home media ==
Despair was released to region 1 DVD and Blu-Ray in 2011.
