= Berlin Alexanderplatz (miniseries) =

German television miniseries

- US theatrical poster (with prominent misspelling)
- Based on: Berlin Alexanderplatz by Alfred Döblin
- Screenplay by: Rainer Werner Fassbinder
- Directed by: Rainer Werner Fassbinder
- Starring: Günter Lamprecht; Hanna Schygulla; Barbara Sukowa; Elisabeth Trissenaar; Gottfried John
- Narrated by: Rainer Werner Fassbinder
- Music by: Peer Raben
- Country of origin: West Germany
- Original language: German

Production
- Producers: Peter Märthesheimer; Günter Rohrbach; Gunther Witte
- Cinematography: Xaver Schwarzenberger
- Editor: Juliane Lorenz
- Running time: 894 minutes
- Production companies: Bavaria Film; RAI; WDR
- Budget: DM 13 million (USD$7.1 million)

Original release
- Release: 12 October – 29 December 1980

Berlin Alexanderplatz (German: [bɛʁˈliːn ʔalɛkˈsandɐˌplats]), originally broadcast in 1980, is a 14-part West German crime television miniseries, set in 1920s Berlin and adapted and directed by Rainer Werner Fassbinder from Alfred Döblin's 1929 novel of the same name. It stars Günter Lamprecht, Hanna Schygulla, Barbara Sukowa, Elisabeth Trissenaar and Gottfried John. The complete series is 15 hours (NTSC and home media releases expand the runtime by half an hour).

In 1983, it was released theatrically in the United States by TeleCulture, where a theater would show two or three parts per night. It garnered a cult following there and was eventually released on VHS and broadcast on PBS and then Bravo. In 1985, it was transmitted in the United Kingdom on Channel 4.

== Episodes ==
Episode Guide
No.	Title	First aired	Runtime (mins.)
1	"The Punishment Begins" "Die Strafe beginnt"	12 October 1980	82
2	"How Is One to Live if One Doesn’t Want to Die?" "Wie soll man leben, wenn man nicht sterben will"	13 October 1980	60
3	"A Hammer Blow to the Head Can Injure the Soul" "Ein Hammer auf den Kopf kann die Seele verletzen"	20 October 1980	59
4	"A Handful of People in the Depths of Silence" "Eine Handvoll Menschen in der Tiefe der Stille"	27 October 1980	59
5	"A Reaper with the Power of Our Lord" "Ein Schnitter mit der Gewalt vom lieben Gott"	3 November 1980	60
6	"Love Has Its Price" "Eine Liebe, das kostet immer viel"	10 November 1980	59
7	"Remember — An Oath Can Be Amputated" "Merke: Einen Schwur kann man amputieren"	17 November 1980	58
8	"The Sun Warms the Skin, but Burns It Sometimes Too" "Die Sonne wärmt die Haut, die sie manchmal verbrennt"	24 November 1980	59
9	"About the Eternities Between the Many and the Few" "Von den Ewigkeiten zwischen den Vielen und den Wenigen"	1 December 1980	59
10	"Loneliness Tears Cracks of Madness Even in Walls" "Einsamkeit reißt auch in Mauern Risse des Irrsinns"	8 December 1980	60
11	"Knowledge Is Power and the Early Bird Catches the Worm" "Wissen ist Macht und Morgenstund hat Gold im Mund"	15 December 1980	59
12	"The Serpent in the Soul of the Serpent" "Die Schlange in der Seele der Schlange"	22 December 1980	60
13	"The Outside and the Inside and the Secret of Fear of the Secret" "Das Äußere und das Innere und das Geheimnis der Angst vor dem Geheimnis"	29 December 1980	59
14	"My Dream of the Dream of Franz Biberkopf by Alfred Döblin, an Epilogue" "Mein Traum vom Traum des Franz Biberkopf von Alfred Döblin - Ein Epilog"	29 December 1980	112

== Synopsis ==
=== "The Punishment Begins" ===
Berlin, 1928. Franz Biberkopf is released after serving four years in Tegel prison for killing his girlfriend Ida. After settling into his old apartment he visits Minna, Ida's sister, and rapes her. In a flashback we see Franz kill Ida with a cream whip after correctly suspecting she was about to leave him. Franz later runs into his old friend Meck and has a drink with him in Max's bar, a local place. There he meets Lina Przybilla, a young Polish woman, who moves in with him. He receives notification from the Berlin police that he is barred from living in certain Berlin districts and surrounding municipalities, under the threat of a fine or imprisonment. Biberkopf places himself under the supervision of a charity called Prisoners' Aid, to which he must report once a month while remaining in employment. By doing this, he is able to remain in Berlin.

=== "How Is One to Live if One Doesn’t Want to Die?" ===
Franz is self-employed hawking necktie holders on the street, but has trouble making enough money and does not consider himself an orator. After turning down the opportunity to sell sex education manuals, he is talked into selling the Nazi newspaper Völkischer Beobachter and wearing a swastika armband. In the subway, Franz is confronted by a Jewish man selling hot sausages, but denies being antisemitic. He also meets Dreske with two other men also known to Franz. Dreske admires Lenin and the Soviet Union, but Franz responds by decrying revolution and 'their' Weimar Republic. At Max's bar, Dreske and his friends sing "The Internationale” to provoke Franz, to which he responds by singing the 19th-century patriotic songs "The Watch on the Rhine and "Ich hatt' einen Kameraden". At the top of his voice, Franz accuses them of being loudmouths and crooks, before almost collapsing. The other men return to their table. Outside, Franz meets Lina. He rambles about what has just happened, claiming that the men he has just met cannot understand life and do not know what it is like to be in prison.

=== "A Hammer Blow to the Head Can Injure the Soul" ===
Lina is now troubled by the dubious nature of the job Franz is fulfilling. She introduces him to a family friend, Otto Lüders, who turns out to be an ex-con he knows from prison, but Franz thinks Otto is a good man. With him, Franz begins selling shoelaces door-to-door. In the first apartment, Franz spends time with a widow whose deceased husband he closely resembles. Later, to Otto, he reports having sex with the widow. The next day, Otto goes to the widow's home and expects the same, but she feels threatened and rejects him. Otto demands money and steals from her. When Franz goes back to the widow, happily expecting another tryst, she slams the door on him. Franz vanishes. Lina distraught, searches for him with Meck. They wake Otto in the early morning, but Meck recognises that his account is full of lies and hits him. Franz is found in a flophouse by Otto, who is immediately threatened with a chair. Otto offers him a share of the money Franz realises has been extorted from the widow, but wanting to go straight, he pours the contents of a chamber pot over Otto. Meck gets Franz's location out of Otto, but Franz had left soon after the earlier incident. Meck persuades Lina that Franz wishes to be left alone, and suggests she live with him.

=== "A Handful of People in the Depths of Silence" ===
Franz goes on an alcohol binge as a former medical orderly, Baumann, looks after him in rooms in a building opposite the one occupied by the prisoners' charity on which he depends for his liberty in Berlin. Franz wanders the streets in a delirious state; outside a church he takes a coal delivery man for a pastor. When he comes round after another binge, Baumann tells him he has been lying in a stupor for three days. Franz now feels that neither God, Satan, angels or other people can help him. After various thefts in the building become known, Baumann tells Franz he will not be with him for much longer, though the occupants of the neighbouring rooms are soon arrested. Franz strikes up a conversation with the vendor who offered him the sex education manuals, and discovers Meck is now selling clothes on the street and apparently doing well. Meck admits to Franz that he had been living with Lina until she left him.

=== "A Reaper with the Power of Our Lord" ===
Franz, after several fleeting encounters, has finally become reacquainted with Eva. Eva, for whom he used to pimp, feels a deep affection for him, and has paid the rent for his old rooms in his absence. At Max's, Meck introduces Franz to Pums, the ringleader of an illegal enterprise. He also meets Reinhold, one of Pums's men. Reinhold is tired of his woman, Fränze, and wants Franz to take her off his hands. Franz has her come over and has sex with her. She returns to him after she cannot find Reinhold. Reinhold then employs the same plan with his current woman, Cilly, whom Franz accommodates after provoking a row with Fränze. Reinhold, after contact with the Salvation Army, has had enough of "broads" and is desperate to end his involvement with his current woman, Trude, but Cilly is angry when this is explained to her by Franz, and she briefly considers Franz worse in his treatment of women than Reinhold, possibly unaware of Ida's murder, but she persuades Franz to tell Trude about Reinhold's nature. They are reconciled.

=== "Love Has Its Price" ===
Franz explains to Reinhold that he wants Cilly to remain with him. Franz gets sucked into Pums's gang when he is drafted for a job as a last-minute replacement for Bruno, who gets beaten in the street. Franz ends up as a lookout as Pums, Reinhold, and Meck pull a robbery. In the getaway truck, Reinhold becomes suspicious of Franz because of a car that seems to be following them. Reinhold throws Franz out of the back of the truck.

=== "Remember — An Oath Can Be Amputated" ===
Franz has survived the car accident, but his right arm has been amputated. He recuperates for a time with Eva and Eva's lover Herbert. Herbert agitates against Pums's syndicate, so the boss decides to take up a collection to help with Franz's medical costs. Franz goes to a red light district and encounters a pimp who offers him a woman he calls the whore of Babylon.

=== "The Sun Warms the Skin, but Burns It Sometimes Too" ===
Franz gets involved in an illegal enterprise with Willy, whom he met at a cabaret. Eva and Herbert drop by to see Franz and bring a young woman, Emilie Karsunke, whom they offer as a new lover. Franz and the tender-hearted woman, whom he nicknames Mieze, fall for each other. However, their spell of love is broken when Franz finds a love letter from another man.

=== "About the Eternities Between the Many and the Few" ===
Eva explains to Franz that Mieze just wants to work to support him as Franz cannot do so due to his missing arm. He reconciles with Mieze. Franz goes to Reinhold's and tells him how he has become a pimp. Reinhold is disgusted by Franz's stump of an arm. Franz is inspired by a communist rally, during which Franz daydreams. After the meeting, Franz and Willy playfully debate a militant worker about the merits of their "dishonest" work. The two then meet Eva and Herbert, wherein Franz mockingly recounts the lessons he's learned about power and the state at the meeting, before more seriously soliliquizing about the role of order and authority versus a more limitless power.

=== "Loneliness Tears Cracks of Madness Even in Walls" ===
As Mieze cannot have children, Eva tells her she will have a child with Franz that Mieze can then raise. Mieze is delighted, to the point that Eva asks if she is a lesbian. Eva also tells Mieze she's concerned that Franz is getting into trouble with "rogue" Willy, when he should be attending to those who took his arm. At Max's bar, Franz listens as Willy espouses Nietzschean ideas while Max pleads with a Marxist to keep politics out of the bar. Franz drunkenly wanders the streets at night repeating snippets of the conversation before declaring he has no use for politics. Franz takes a taxi to the Tegel prison, where he falls asleep on a park bench before being accosted by a police officer and, now very drunk, making his way back home. The next day, Mieze asks Franz to stay out of politics, and he again declares he has no interest. Mieze admits she has taken a rich client and; Franz is horrified as he thinks Mieze wants to be rid of him, until Mieze describes the agreement made with Eva for Franz's baby. After Mieze leaves, Eva arrives and asks if Franz wants to have the baby, and the two have sex. Responding negatively to a lecture from Herbert on his increasing drunkenness, Franz returns home and Mieze and he agree to get drunk. Mieze's rich client arrives. Franz finds out that she is going away with him for three days and weeps in despair.

=== "Knowledge Is Power and the Early Bird Catches the Worm" ===
Franz goes to Reinhold and tells him he wants to get involved with Pums again. Reinhold still has his suspicions but Franz is allowed to assist the gang with a job. Mieze is upset that Franz is earning money because she thinks Franz wants to be independent of her, but Franz reassures her. Franz brags to Reinhold about Mieze's devotion and decides to show him what a fine woman she is. In the apartment, Franz has Reinhold hide in the bed when Mieze arrives. She reveals she is in love with another man. Franz is angered and beats her cruelly, but Reinhold saves her and Franz throws Reinhold out. Mieze goes out to Franz and the two reconcile, though she has been bloodied by him. Franz and Mieze take a trip outside Berlin, where he explains to her he simply wanted Reinhold to see a true woman.

=== "The Serpent in the Soul of the Serpent" ===
Franz introduces Mieze to Meck. Reinhold blackmails Meck to set up a meeting for him with Mieze. Meck takes Mieze on a drive to Bad Freienwalde and delivers her to Reinhold. Reinhold takes her for a walk in the woods, where she resists his advances. Mieze wants to know more about Franz, and Reinhold reveals it is because of him that Franz lost his arm. Mieze is horrified at this revelation. Reinhold strangles her and leaves her in the woods.

=== "The Outside and the Inside and the Secret of Fear of the Secret" ===
Franz tells Eva that Mieze has left him. Eva reassures him, though she is a bit concerned herself. A robbery pulled off by Pums's gang goes wrong and Meck burns himself with a welding torch. Franz takes Meck to his apartment to bandage his wound. Meck tells Franz that Reinhold is a bad guy, but Franz claims he has a good heart. Meck takes the police out into the woods and helps them find Mieze's strangled body, telling them he helped to bury her. Eva brings Franz a newspaper that relates Mieze's murder. Franz lapses into demented laughter, claiming he is pleased that at least Mieze did not leave him as he had thought. Once he stops laughing, he vows to kill Reinhold.

=== "My Dream of the Dream of Franz Biberkopf by Alfred Döblin, an Epilogue" ===
In a fantasy sequence, Franz walks along a street of the dead with two angels. He finds Mieze, but she disappears from his arms. Reinhold is in prison for the crimes committed by a man whose identity he has acquired. He is anguished that his cellmate and lover is being released. Franz is taken to an asylum. Much of the rest of the episode takes place in his imagination. Franz's being run over by the car is re-enacted with different characters taking on the roles of victim and driver. In a striking sequence, Franz and Mieze are treated like animals being slaughtered in an abattoir. On a nativity set, Franz is raised on a cross as the other characters watch. An atom bomb goes off in the background and the angels clear the dead. The surreal imagery ceases suddenly and Franz is at Reinhold's trial testifying to his good character. Reinhold is sentenced to 10 years for manslaughter. Eva tells Franz she has lost the baby. The film concludes with Franz as an assistant gatekeeper at a factory. He is alert to his job but not to war on the horizon.

== Cast ==
- Günter Lamprecht as Franz Biberkopf
- Hanna Schygulla as Eva
- Barbara Sukowa as Emilie "Mieze" Karsunke
- Gottfried John as Reinhold Hoffmann
- Franz Buchrieser as Meck
- Claus Holm as Max, bar-owner
- Brigitte Mira as Frau Bast
- Roger Fritz as Herbert
- Elisabeth Trissenaar as Lina Przybilla
- Barbara Valentin as Ida
- Hark Bohm as Otto Lüders
- Ivan Desny as Pums
- Jürgen Draeger as Sausage vendor
- Annemarie Düringer as Cilly
- Irm Hermann as Trude
- Fritz Schediwy as Willy
- Traute Hoess as Emmy
- Volker Spengler as Bruno
- Günther Kaufmann as Theo
- Peter Kollek as Nachum
- Margit Carstensen as Terah
- Helmut Griem as Sarug
- Karin Baal as Minna
- Axel Bauer as Dreske
- Helen Vita as Fränze
- Vitus Zeplichal as Rudi
- Gerhard Zwerenz as Baumann
- Lilo Pempeit as Frau Pums
- Elma Karlowa as Frau Greiner
- Y Sa Lo as Ilse
- Rainer Werner Fassbinder as Narrator / Himself
- Raul Gimenez as Konrad
- Mechthild Großmann as Paula, prostitute
- Peter Kuiper as Bald man
- Angela Schimd as the widow
- Udo Kier as Young man in the bar
- Klaus Höhne as Newspaper vendor
- Herbert Steinmetz as Newspaper vendor in the subway
- Karl Scheydt as Oskar

== Production ==
Berlin Alexanderplatz was a co-production between the German Westdeutscher Rundfunk (WDR), Bavaria Film GmbH and the Italian network RAI.

Production took place at the Bavaria Film Studios for nearly a year.

Fassbinder imagined making a "parallel" film which he would make specifically for theatrical distribution after completion. His fantasy cast included Gérard Depardieu as Franz and Isabelle Adjani as Mieze.

== Reception ==
On the review aggregator website Rotten Tomatoes, 94% of 34 critics' reviews are positive The website's consensus reads: "Rainer Werner Fassbinder's mammoth-length passion project demands a lot of patience, but viewers willing to take the plunge into this dense character study will emerge feeling like they've truly walked in the shoes of another person." The film tied at #202 on the 2012 Sight and Sound Critics Poll.

Film critic Vincent Canby wrote "Fassbinder has created a huge, magnificent melodrama that has the effective shape of a film of conventional length." Critic Richard Corliss said "as it cranes down Berlin boulevards or creeps toward two people in bed, Fassbinder's camera is a most fastidious voyeur, observing every ruction of sexual violence with a clinical sympathy."

Andrew Pulver of The Guardian stated "it isn't especially stylish to look at: much of it is rudimentary, even stagey; but it's the murderous intensity with which Fassbinder bears down on Biberkopf's experience that makes it so compelling." Critic Geoffrey O'Brien commented the series "turned out to be a belated Expressionist masterpiece, harsh and unforgiving in its delineation of Franz's inevitable undoing, implacable in its air of nocturnal gloom."

Slant Magazine opined "the film's two-hour epilogue is ingenious, a descent into absolute hysteria and madness wherein Biberkopf wanders through a politically and spiritually charged psychosexual dreamscape, complete with anachronistic musical cues from the likes of Janis Joplin, Lou Reed, and Kraftwerk." Critic Steve Weintraub opined that "the sad irony of this titanic undertaking is that it would do quite nicely as a two or three hour feature."

== Restoration ==
Theatrical poster for Berlin Alexanderplatz: Remastered (2007)

In 2005, the German Cultural Institute, having completed the reconstruction and restoration of Sergei Eisenstein's Battleship Potemkin, decided to restore Berlin Alexanderplatz, stating that the original 16 mm film negative was in "catastrophic physical condition" and that it "must be restored".

Beginning in 2006, the series underwent restoration and remastering to 35 mm. Berlin Alexanderplatz: Remastered received its world premiere on 9 February 2007 at the Berlin International Film Festival where episodes 1 and 2 were shown. The restoration was completed in early 2007, exactly 25 years after Fassbinder's death. The entire series ran on 11 February 2007 in five instalments. The re-release was accompanied by a book that includes the screenplay, drawings, selections from Döblin's novel, as well as selected reviews.

A DVD set containing additional material was released in Germany on 10 February 2007, and was released in America through The Criterion Collection in November 2007. Richard Corliss of Time named it one of the Top 10 DVDs of 2007, ranking it at No. 9.

== See also ==
- List of longest films by running time
