= Lullaby to My Father =

- Directed by: Amos Gitai
- Written by: Amos Gitai
- Produced by: Amos Gitai; Laurent Truchot; Alex Iordachescu
- Starring: Jeanne Moreau; Hanna Schygulla; Hanna Maron
- Cinematography: Gabriele Basilico; Giora Bejach; Renato Berta; Richard Copans; Amos Gitai
- Edited by: Isabelle Ingold
- Music by: Zoë Keating
- Release dates: 1 September 2012 (Venice Film Festival); 16 January 2013 (France)
- Running time: 87 minutes
- Countries: Israel; France; Switzerland
- Language: French

Lullaby to My Father is a 2012 documentary film directed by Amos Gitai that premiered at the Venice Film Festival.

The film relates the story of Gitai's father, Munio Weinraub (1909-1970), an eminent Israeli architect. Weinraub was a student at the Bauhaus design and architecture school in the city of Dessau when Hitler closed the school in 1933. In May 1933, Weinraub was accused of "treason against the German people", sent to prison and later expelled from Germany. The film traces Munio's route from Poland to Germany, from Switzerland to Palestine.

Gitai has written that his film "is a voyage searching for the relationships between a father and his son, architecture and movies, the history of a journey and intimate memories. Like in my movie Carmel, based on my mother, Efratia's, letters, there is no chronological sequence of events. It is not a reconstituted biography, but a mosaic. The story comes together piece by piece, as a poetical association of pictures, faces, voyages, real architecture and snippets of fiction."

== Cast ==
- Jeanne Moreau
- Hanna Schygulla
- Hanna Maron
