= Lola (1981 film) =

- Theatrical release poster
- Directed by: Rainer Werner Fassbinder
- Written by: Peter Märthesheimer; Pea Fröhlich; Rainer Werner Fassbinder
- Produced by: Horst Wendlandt
- Starring: Barbara Sukowa; Armin Mueller-Stahl; Mario Adorf
- Cinematography: Xaver Schwarzenberger
- Edited by: Juliane Lorenz
- Music by: Peer Raben
- Production companies: Rialto Film; Trio Film
- Distributed by: Tobis
- Release date: 20 August 1981 (West Germany)
- Running time: 113 minutes
- Country: West Germany
- Language: German

Lola is a 1981 West German drama film directed by Rainer Werner Fassbinder, the third in his BRD Trilogy, preceded by The Marriage of Maria Braun (1978) and followed by Veronika Voss (1982). It is a loose adaptation of Heinrich Mann's Professor Unrat (1905), which had previously been adapted for Josef von Sternberg's The Blue Angel (1930).

== Plot ==
In 1957, in the town of Coburg, as in most of West Germany, reconstruction is the watchword, and Coburg's elite all benefit: the mayor, the police chief, the bank president, the newspaper editor and, above all, Schuckert, a property developer who owns the brothel the other men frequent. His favourite employee is its singer, Lola.

This cosy arrangement is threatened by the arrival of the high-minded and cultured von Bohm, a refugee from East Prussia, as the new building commissioner. Divorced, he hires a woman with a young granddaughter as his housekeeper and devotes himself to his new job. One day, while he is out at work, his housekeeper shows her daughter his house. It is Lola, who decides she wants to know this interesting man and soon attracts his attention under her real name, Marie-Luise. Unaware of her night job or that Schuckert is her daughter's father, von Bohm proposes to her, but she warns him off. When he is finally taken to the brothel, he discovers the truth about her.

In the meantime von Bohm has been collecting evidence of Coburg's widespread corruption, including building permits masterminded by Schuckert, and decides to put a stop to it, but nobody is interested. Unable to change the system, and still in love with Lola, he marries her with Schuckert's blessing. As a wedding gift, Schuckert gives the pair the deed to the brothel and, while von Bohm is taking a walk after the church ceremony, takes the bride to bed.

== Cast ==
- Barbara Sukowa as Lola
- Armin Mueller-Stahl as Von Bohm
- Mario Adorf as Schukert
- Matthias Fuchs as Esslin
- Helga Feddersen as Miss Hettich
- Karin Baal as Lola's mother
- Ivan Desny as Wittich
- Elisabeth Volkmann as Gigi
- Hark Bohm as Völker
- Karl-Heinz von Hassel as Timmerding
- Rosel Zech as Mrs. Schuckert
- Christine Kaufmann as Susi
- Y Sa Lo as Rosa
- Günther Kaufmann as G.I.
- Isolde Barth as Mrs. Völker
- Karsten Peters as editor
- Harry Baer as first demonstrator
- Rainer Will as second demonstrator
- Sonja Neudorfer as Mrs. Fink
- Nino Korda as TV delivery man
- Herbert Steinmetz as doorman
- Udo Kier as waiter (uncredited)

== Critical reception ==
The New Yorker's Richard Brody wrote of the film in 2021: "[Fassbinder's] self-aware sense of performance carries political implications. The self-aware candor of the actors' efforts converges with Fassbinder's cinema of consciousness, not cynical or knowing cinema but a critical one—one that's critical, in particular, of the history and the condition of West Germany at large. His gimlet eye for the vanity of mythologies and grandiloquence puts him a step ahead of his New German Cinema colleagues Wim Wenders and Werner Herzog." On the review aggregator website Rotten Tomatoes, 93% of 15 critics' reviews are positive.

== Home media ==
In 2003, The Criterion Collection released Lola on DVD in a set of Fassbinder's BRD Trilogy. In 2017, StudioCanal released it on Blu-ray in restored 4K.In 2019, Criterion released it on Blu-ray as part of another BDR trilogy set.
