= Eight Hours Don't Make a Day =

- Created by: Rainer Werner Fassbinder
- Starring: Gottfried John; Hanna Schygulla; Luise Ullrich; Werner Finck; Wolfgang Schenck; Kurt Raab; Renate Roland; Irm Hermann; Rudolf Waldemar Brem
- Composer: Fuzzy
- Country of origin: West Germany
- No. of seasons: 1
- No. of episodes: 5

Production
- Producer: Peter Märthesheimer
- Cinematography: Dietrich Lohmann
- Editor: Marie Anne Gerhardt
- Running time: 478 minutes

Original release
- Network: Westdeutscher Rundfunk
- Release: 29 October 1972 – 18 March 1973

Eight Hours Don't Make a Day (German: Acht Stunden sind kein Tag) (also translated as (Eight Hours Are Not a Day) is a West German television miniseries written and directed by Rainer Werner Fassbinder. Commissioned by Westdeutscher Rundfunk, it was broadcast in five episodes between 1972 and 1973. The story follows a group of working-class people in Cologne, West Germany.

== Episodes ==
Episode guide
No.	Title	First aired	Runtime (mins.)	Synopsis
1	"Jochen and Marion" "Jochen und Marion"	29 October 1972	107	A love affair blossoms between middle-class tool factory employee Jochen and office advertiser Marion.
2	"Grandma and Gregor" "Oma und Gregor"	27 December 1972	105	Jochen's grandmother searches for an affordable apartment to share with Gregor, a gentleman she picked up in a park. When Grandma comes across an abandoned library space, she and Gregor decide to become do-it-yourself squatters and turn it into a kindergarten.
3	"Franz and Ernst" "Franz und Ernst"	21 January 1973	97	After the death of the foreman, the tool factory comrades hope that Franz will get promoted. However, tensions rise when the manager instead brings in an outsider.
4	"Harald and Monika" "Harald und Monika"	18 February 1973	95	Following a visit from Marion's strict mother, Jochen is pressured into proposing. Meanwhile, growing strained relations between Monika and the overbearing Harald start Monika on thoughts of divorce.
5	"Irmgard and Rolf" "Irmgard und Rolf"	18 March 1973	94	Upon discovering that the tool factory is being relocated, Jochen and Marion seek a new place while the workers list demands for their growing impatience.

== Cast ==
All episodes

- Gottfried John as Jochen Epp
- Hanna Schygulla as Marion Andreas
- Luise Ulrich as Oma Krüger
- Werner Finck as Gregor Mack
- Irm Hermann as Irmgard Erlkönig
- Wolfgang Schenck as Franz Miltenberger
- Wolfgang Zerlett as Manfred Müller
- Rudolf Waldemar Brem as Rolf Schwein
- Grigorios Karipidis as Giuseppe Giuliano
- Wolfried Lier as Wolf Epp
- Hans Hirschmüller as Jürgen Graf
- Renate Roland as Monika
- Anita Bucher as Käthe Epp
- Karl Scheydt as Arbeiter Peter
- Rainer Hauer as Werkshallenleiter Volkmar Gross
- Andrea Schober as Sylvia
- Herb Andress as Rüdiger
- Thorsten Massinger as Manni Andreas
- Kurt Raab as Harald (4 episodes)
- El Hedi ben Salem (uncredited) as Dunkelhäutiger Arbeiter (4 episodes)
- Ruth Drexel as Frau Miltenberger (3 episodes)
- Christine Oesterlein as Tante Klara (2 episodes)
- Brigitte Mira as Marions Mutter, Frau Andreas (1 episode)
- Peter Gauhe as Ernst Friedrich (1 episode)
- Victor Curland as Meister Fritz Kretzschmer (1 episode)
- Klaus Löwitsch as Dr. Betram (1 episode)
- Rudolf Lenz as Vermieter Mattes (1 episode)
- Hans Gromball as Betrüger (1 episode)
- Valeska Gert as Die andere Oma (1 episode)
- Margit Carstensen as Hausfrau (1 episode)
- Ulli Lommel as Peter (1 episode)
- Eva Mattes as Beschwippste Freundin (1 episode)
- Lilo Pempeit as Hausfrau Müller (1 episode)
- Heinz Meier as Beamter Meier (1 episode)
- Ursula Strätz (uncredited) as Peters Frau (1 episode)
- Peter Chatel as Mann in der Anzeigenannahme (1 episode)

== Restoration ==
In December 2016, it was announced that the restored version would have its world premiere in the Berlinale Special section of the 67th Berlin International Film Festival. In September 2017, Arrow Films released this version in a limited edition dual-format DVD and Blu-ray box set in the UK. The UK release runs at the original speed of 25 frames per second. In October 2018, The Criterion Collection released it on DVD and Blu-ray in the USA, slowed to 24 frames per second.
