= Elisabeth Trissenaar =

Austrian actress (1944–2024)

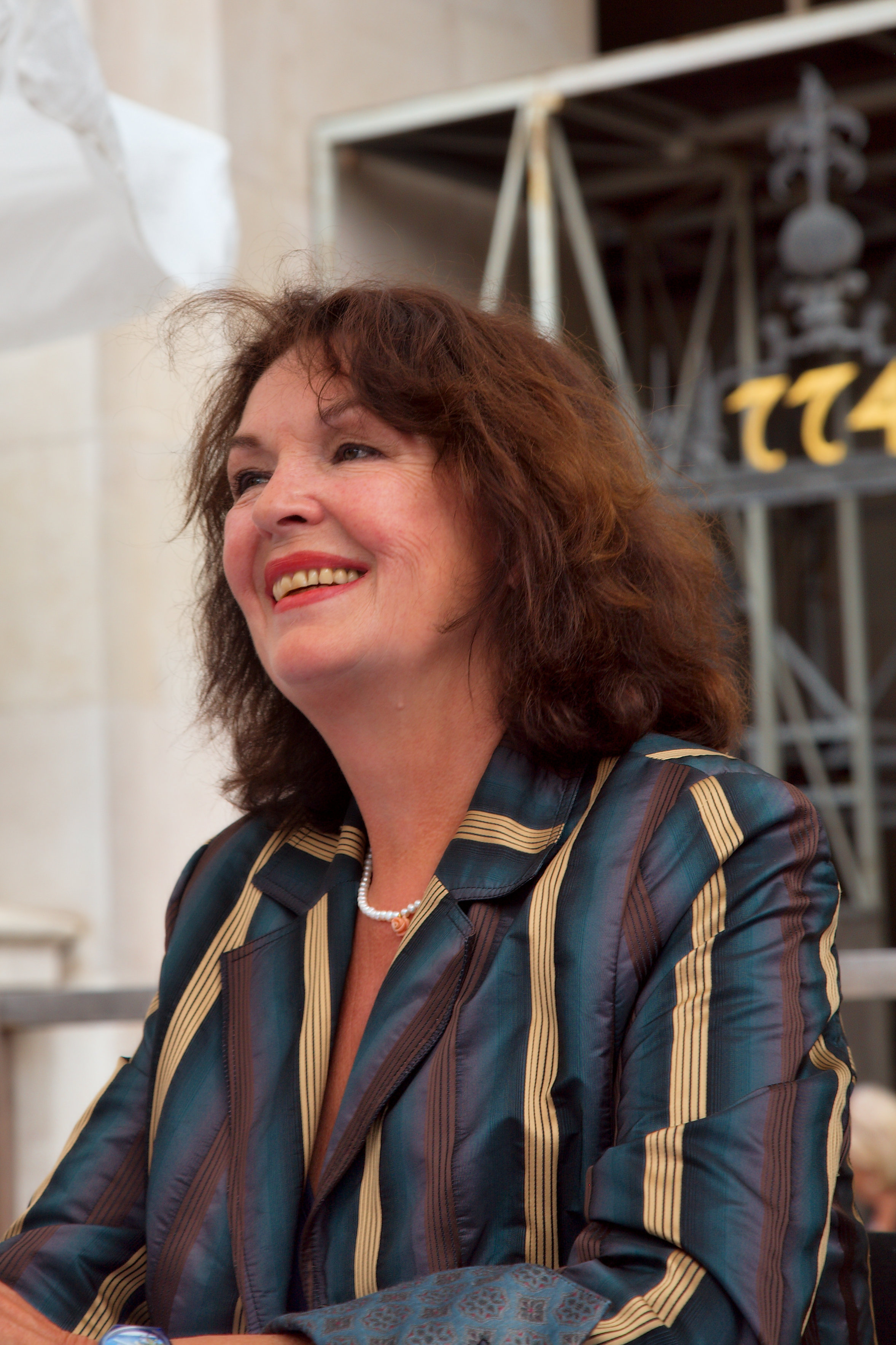
- Born: 13 April 1944; Vienna, Austria
- Died: 14 January 2024 (aged 79); Berlin, Germany
- Occupation: Actress
- Years active: 1964–2010
- Spouse: Hans Neuenfels (until his death in 2022)
- Website: http://elisabeth-trissenaar.com/

Elisabeth Trissenaar (13 April 1944 – 14 January 2024) was an Austrian actress.

== Life and career ==
Trissenaar's father was the Dutchman Frans Trijssenaar. After studying at the Max-Reinhardt-Seminar in Vienna, she was cast in her first role at the Bern Theatre in 1964. Between 1972 and 1981, she had great success at the Schauspiel Frankfurt, especially in the roles of Nora Helmer in A Doll's House and in the title role of Hedda Gabler (both plays by Ibsen), as well as Medea by Euripides.

During this time, Trissenaar began her collaboration with Rainer Werner Fassbinder, under his direction she was in works such as The Stationmaster's Wife (Bolwieser, 1977), In a Year of 13 Moons (1978), The Marriage of Maria Braun (1979), and in the television series of Alfred Döblin's Berlin Alexanderplatz (1980). Also, she played leading roles in Robert van Ackeren's films The Other Smile (1978) and Purity of Heart (Die Reinheit des Herzens, 1980), in the Oscar-nominated film Angry Harvest (Bittere Ernte, 1985), and in Xaver Schwarzenberger's Franza (1987).

Trissenaar was married to the director Hans Neuenfels until his death in 2022; they had a son, the film director Benedict Neuenfels. Trissenaar died in Berlin on 14 January 2024, at the age of 79.

== Awards ==
- 1981: German critics' award (Deutscher Kritikerpreis)

== Selected filmography ==
- Miss Julie (1971, TV film, based on the play Miss Julie), as Miss Julie
- A Doll's House (1973, TV film, based on the play A Doll's House), as Nora Helmer
- Hedda Gabler (1974, TV film, based on the play Hedda Gabler), as Hedda Gabler
- Dorothea Merz (1976, TV film, based on a novel by Tankred Dorst), as Bella Schedewy
- Und Rosa und Marilyn und ... (1977, TV film, based on the play Étoiles rouges by Pierre Bourgeade), as Marilyn
- The Stationmaster's Wife (1977 TV film and 1983 theatrical release, based on a novel by Oskar Maria Graf), as Hanni Bolwieser
- Das Ende einer Karriere (1978, TV film), as Karla
- The Other Smile (1978, TV film), as Ellen
- In a Year of 13 Moons (1978), as Irene Weishaupt
- When Hitler Stole Pink Rabbit (1978, TV film, based on the novel When Hitler Stole Pink Rabbit), as Anna's Mother
- The Marriage of Maria Braun (1979), as Betti
- Purity of Heart (1980), as Lisa
- Das Käthchen von Heilbronn (1980, TV film, based on the play Das Käthchen von Heilbronn), as Kunigunde von Thurneck
- Berlin Alexanderplatz (1980, TV miniseries, based on the novel Berlin Alexanderplatz), as Lina Przybilla
- Charlotte (1981), as Paulinka
- Heinrich Penthesilea von Kleist (1983, based on the play Penthesilea), as Penthesilea
- A Love in Germany (1983, based on a novel by Rolf Hochhuth), as Elsbeth Schnittgens
- Bluebeard (1984, TV film, based on the novel Bluebeard), as Andrea
- Angry Harvest (1985, based on a novel by Hermann Field and Stanislaw Mierzenski), as Rosa Eckart
- Franza (1986, TV film, based on a novel by Ingeborg Bachmann), as Franza
- The Winner Takes All (1987, TV film, based on a novel by Dieter Wellershoff), as Elisabeth Vogtmann
- Erloschene Zeiten (1987, TV film), as Alma Mahler
- Mario and the Magician (1994, based on the novella Mario and the Magician), as Sofronia Angiolieri
- Nobody Loves Me (1994), as Madeleine
- Der Hauptmann von Köpenick (1997, TV film, based on the play The Captain of Köpenick), as Mathilde Obermüller
- The Bubi Scholz Story (1998, TV film), as Renate
- Cold Is the Evening Breeze (2000, based on a novel by Ingrid Noll), as Charlotte's Mother
- SOKO Kitzbühel - Der Ring der Toten (2004, TV series based on a book by Martin Ambrosch), as Sofia von Schöll
- Under the Dark Sun of Africa (2005, TV film), as Ingrid, Catherine's Mother
- I've Never Been Happier (2009), as Fritzi
- The Devil from Milan (2012, TV film), as Maman
