= Pea Fröhlich =

German screenwriter and psychologist

Pea Fröhlich (1943–2022) was a German screenwriter and psychologist, best known for co-writing all three films of the BRD Trilogy: The Marriage of Maria Braun, Veronika Voss and Lola. She also wrote for Bloch.

== Filmography ==
- 1979: The Marriage of Maria Braun (dir. Rainer Werner Fassbinder)
- 1981: Looping (dir. Walter Bockmayer)
- 1981: Lola (dir. Rainer Werner Fassbinder)
- 1982: Veronika Voss (dir. Rainer Werner Fassbinder)
- 1985: The Cop and the Girl (dir. Peter Keglevic)
- 1987: The Cry of the Owl (dir. Tom Toelle), TV film
- 1989: Radiofieber (dir. Dietrich Haugk), TV miniseries
- 1991: The Indecent Woman (dir. Ben Verbong)
- 1992: Haus am See (dir. Ilse Hofmann), TV series
- 1994: Weihnachten mit Willy Wuff (dir. Maria Theresia Wagner), TV film
- 1995: Deutschlandlied (dir. Tom Toelle), TV miniseries
- 1996: Tatort: Das Mädchen mit der Puppe (dir. Markus Fischer), TV
- 2002: Was ist bloß mit meinen Männern los? (dir. Reto Salimbeni), TV film
- 2002–2005: Bloch, TV series, 7 episodes
- 2006: I Am the Other Woman (dir. Margarethe von Trotta)
