= Veronika Voss =

- Theatrical release poster by Vincent Topazio
- Directed by: Rainer Werner Fassbinder
- Written by: Rainer Werner Fassbinder; Pea Fröhlich; Peter Märthesheimer
- Produced by: Thomas Schühly
- Starring: Rosel Zech; Hilmar Thate; Cornelia Froboess
- Cinematography: Xaver Schwarzenberger
- Music by: Peer Raben
- Production companies: Laura Film; Tango Film; Rialto Film; Trio Film; Maran Film; Süddeutscher Rundfunk
- Distributed by: Filmverlag der Autoren
- Release date: 18 February 1982
- Running time: 104 minutes
- Country: West Germany
- Language: German

Veronika Voss (German: Die Sehnsucht der Veronika Voss, lit. "The Longing of Veronika Voss") is a 1982 West German black-and-white drama film directed by Rainer Werner Fassbinder, and starring Rosel Zech, Hilmar Thate, and Cornelia Froboess. Loosely based on the career of actress Sybille Schmitz, the film follows the titular Veronika Voss, a morphine-addicted film star in 1955 Munich who begins an affair with a sports journalist; soon after, he discovers that Veronika is under the control of a corrupt neurologist scheming to bleed her of her wealth.

Veronika Voss is the second film of his BRD Trilogy, but was chronologically made last, after The Marriage of Maria Braun and Lola. It is also the penultimate film of his career (preceding Querelle) and the last film released during Fassbinder's lifetime.

== Plot ==
In 1955 Munich, Veronika Voss is a neurotic, faded UFA film star who is said to have slept with Joseph Goebbels but is now struggling to get roles. While riding the U-Bahn, she meets sports reporter Robert Krohn and is intrigued that he does not know who she is. The two have lunch together, and Veronika is recognized in a jewelry shop by two older women who ask for her autograph, and comment on the death of Veronika's husband during World War II.

Veronika and Robert begin a love affair, even though Robert already lives with his girlfriend Henriette, who nevertheless realizes that Veronika has an irresistible allure. When Veronika arrives at their apartment asking to spend the night with Robert at her large house outside of the city, Henriette passively allows Robert to go with her. During their rendezvous, Veronika awakens in a manic and confused state, which startles Robert.

Veronika's behavior becomes erratic and increasingly desperate, and her faltering career sends her into a downward spiral, as she finds herself being passed over for roles which are given to younger actresses. Robert decides to write a story about aging movie stars that were once popular and now go unnoticed, using Veronika as a case study. As Robert delves into her life he discovers that she is essentially a captive to a corrupt neurologist named Dr. Marianne Katz. Dr. Katz keeps Veronika addicted to morphine and uses her power to give or deny drugs as a means to bleed the actress of her wealth.

To verify his suspicions, Robert has Henriette approach Dr. Katz and pretend to be a rich woman in need of psychiatric care. Dr. Katz writes Henriette a prescription for an opiate but immediately afterwards sees her making a call from a phone booth across the street. Dr. Katz has Henriette killed and with Veronika's help covers up the crime when Robert arrives with the police.

The film ends tragically as Dr. Katz and her cohorts have Veronika sign over all that she owns and leave her with a fatal dose of pills. After Veronika's death, Robert observes the villains celebrating their victory and is unable to do a thing.

== Cast ==
- Rosel Zech as Veronika Voss
- Hilmar Thate as Robert Krohn
- Cornelia Froboess as Henriette
- Annemarie Düringer as Dr. Marianne Katz
- Armin Mueller-Stahl as Max Rehbein
- Doris Schade as Josefa
- Erik Schumann as Dr. Edel
- Peter Berling as Film producer
- Günther Kaufmann as G.I.
- Sonja Neudorfer as Saleswoman
- Lilo Pempeit as Manageress
- Volker Spengler as Film director #1
- Herbert Steinmetz as Gardner
- Elisabeth Volkmann as Grete
- Hans Wyprächtiger as Editor-in-chief
- Peter Zadek as Film director #2
- Johanna Hofer and Rudolf Platte as the old married couple
- Juliane Lorenz as a secretary

== Comment ==
The film is loosely based on the career of actress Sybille Schmitz and is influenced by Billy Wilder’s Sunset Boulevard.

Fassbinder has a cameo role in the beginning of the film sitting behind Voss in a movie theatre and watching her old movie. Lilo Pempeit (also Liselotte Eder), who plays the manager of a jewelry store, was Fassbinder's mother. Günther Kaufmann, one of Fassbinder's former lovers, plays in all three films of the cycle. In this one he is an enigmatic African-American G.I. Juliane Lorenz, who's seen in the brief role of a secretary, was a close associate of Fassbinder and the editor of this film. Lorenz had spotted an article in Die Zeit about Schmitz's legal troubles and brought it to Fassbinder's attention. She became the chief executive of Fassbinder's estate, the Rainer Werner Fassbinder Foundation.

== Music ==
Several American country music songs appear on the soundtrack throughout the film, including Sanford Clark's version of Lee Hazlewood's "Run Boy Run"; Johnny Horton's "The Battle of New Orleans"; Tennessee Ernie Ford's "Sixteen Tons"; and Tommy Collins's "High on a Hilltop" performed by The Berlin Ramblers. Zech as Voss also performs a version of Dean Martin's "Memories Are Made of This" in the manner of Marlene Dietrich.

== Reception and awards ==
The film was entered into the 32nd Berlin International Film Festival, where it won the Golden Bear. However, the film failed to get 1981 German Film Award nomination in the Best (feature) film category.

Roger Ebert added the film to his Great Movies collection.

In 2012, filmmaker Ashim Ahluwalia included the film in his personal top ten (for The Sight & Sound Top 50 Greatest Films of All Time poll), writing: "Fassbinder's opiated take on Sunset Boulevard, Veronika Voss makes Billy Wilder's movie look like a children's special. Voss's drug overdose/suicide eerily foreshadows Fassbinder's own later that same year infusing deep tragedy and new meaning to the term 'a film about film'".

== Legacy ==
Veronika Voss inspired Lucile Hadžihalilović's 2025 fantasy drama film The Ice Tower. Hadžihalilović said: "A woman unraveling—an actress lost to morphine and memory. The blend of realism and theatricality feels dreamlike. The film within a film, the enigmatic storytelling, and the striking nods to German Expressionism continue to intrigue me."

== See also ==
- List of German language films
- List of recent films in black-and-white
