= Gottfried John =

German actor and voice actor

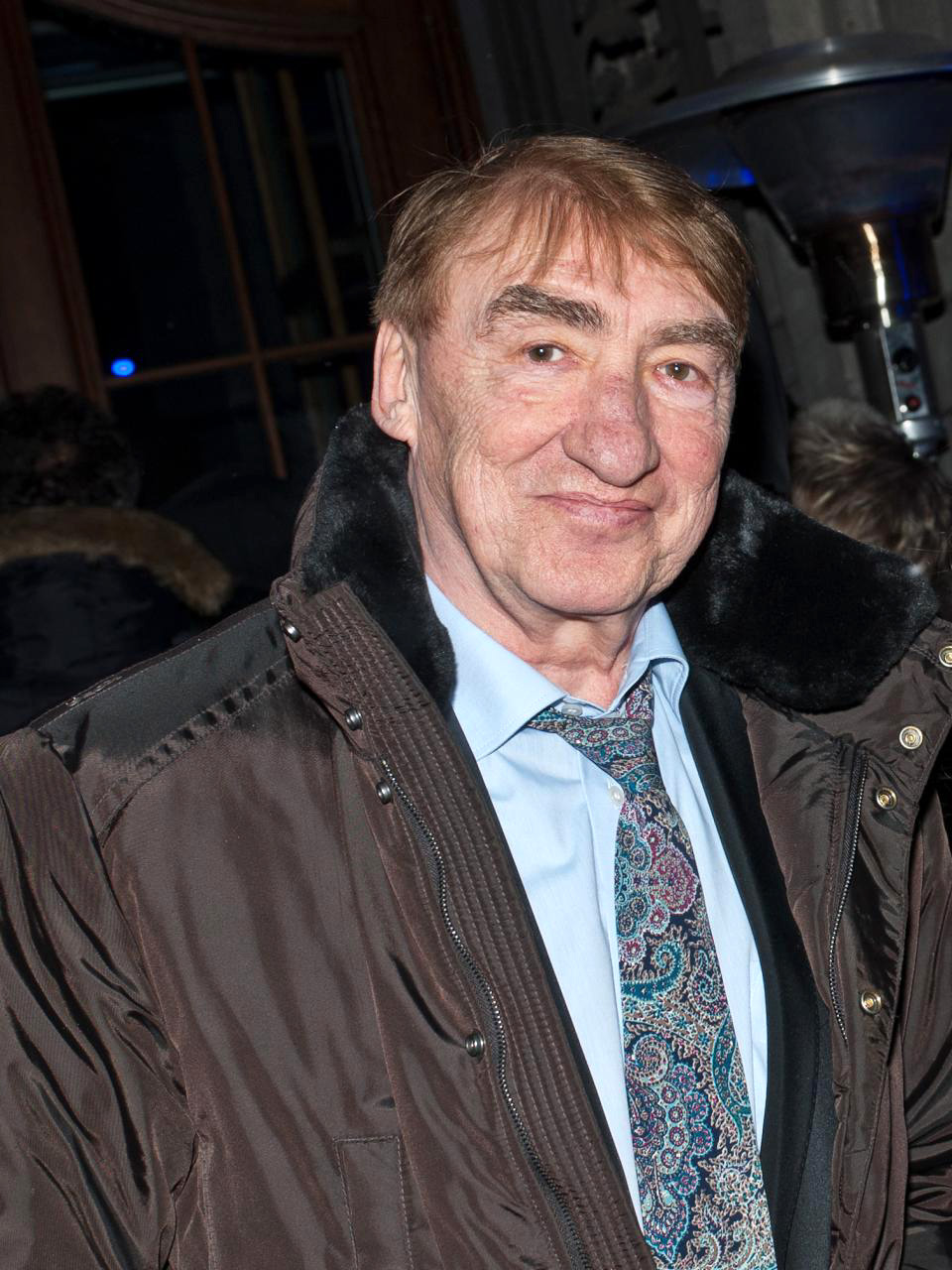
- Gottfried John at the 2012 Berlin International Film Festival
- Born: 29 August 1942; Berlin, Germany
- Died: 1 September 2014 (aged 72); Utting am Ammersee, Germany
- Occupation: Actor
- Years active: 1962–2014
- Spouse: Brigitte John (2004–2014; his death)

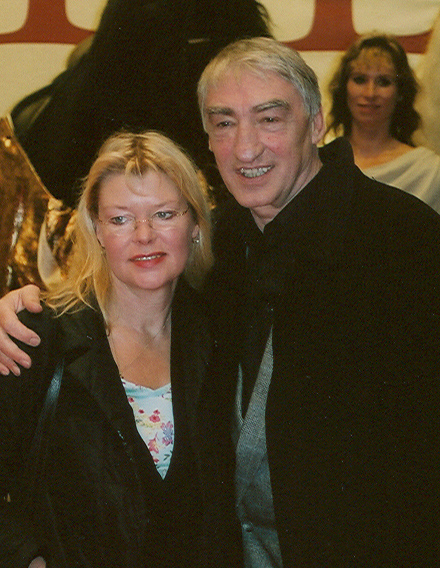
Gottfried and Brigitte John in 2004

Gottfried John (German: [ˈjoːn]; 29 August 1942 – 1 September 2014) was a German stage, screen, and voice actor. A longtime collaborator of Rainer Werner Fassbinder, John appeared in nine of his films between 1975 and 1981, the year before Fassbinder's death, including Eight Hours Don't Make a Day, Mother Küsters' Trip to Heaven, Despair, The Marriage of Maria Braun, and Berlin Alexanderplatz. His distinctive, gaunt appearance saw him frequently cast as villains, and he is best known to audiences for his role as the corrupt General Arkady Ourumov in the 1995 James Bond film GoldenEye and his comedic turn as Julius Caesar in Asterix and Obelix vs. Caesar (1999), for the latter of which he won the Bavarian Film Award for Best Supporting Actor.

== Early life ==
John was born in Berlin, Germany, on 29 August 1942. During World War II, he and his mother were evacuated to East Prussia; his father, whom he never met, was married to another woman. He grew up with his single-parent mother and in several protectories; John fled from one when he was 15 years old and returned to his mother, who was living in Paris, France.

In Paris, he earned a living as a pavement artist and construction worker, returning to Berlin in 1960.

== Career ==
During the 1970s and early 1980s, John was cast by director Rainer Werner Fassbinder in several of his projects, in particular as Reinhold in the Berlin Alexanderplatz (1980) miniseries.

He was internationally known for his portrayal of General Arkady Ourumov in the James Bond film GoldenEye (1995) and Julius Caesar in Asterix and Obelix vs. Caesar (1999).

== Personal life ==
For many years, he lived in Kelmis, Belgium, just over the border from Aachen, Germany, until 2008. John then lived with his wife, Brigitte, in Utting am Ammersee, near Munich, Germany, from 2008 until his death.

On 1 September 2014, it was announced that John had died in Utting am Ammersee of cancer aged 72.

== Works ==
=== Filmography ===
- Café Oriental (1962) (uncredited)
- Das Mädchen und der Staatsanwalt (1962), as Train passenger (uncredited)
- Jaider, der einsame Jäger (1971), as Jaider
- Carlos (1971, TV Movie), as Carlos
- Eight Hours Don't Make a Day (1972–1973, TV Series), as Jochen
- World on a Wire (1973, TV Movie), as Einstein
- Mother Küsters' Trip to Heaven (1975), as Niemeyer
- Der Kommissar: Der Held des Tages (1976, TV series episode), as Werner Stimmel
- Derrick: Das Superding (1976, TV series episode), as Krummbach
- Und Rosa und Marilyn und ... (1977, TV Movie)
- The Stationmaster's Wife (1977, TV Movie), as Divorce lawyer
- Edwards Film (1977, TV Movie)
- Despair (1978), as Perebrodov
- Fedora (1978), as Kritos
- Marija (1978, TV Movie), as Filipp
- 1982: Gutenbach (1978, TV Movie), as Peter Kessel
- In a Year of 13 Moons (1978), as Anton Saitz
- Die Ratten (1979, TV Movie), as Bruno Mechelke
- Wo die Liebe hinfällt (1979, anthology film, TV Movie)
- The Marriage of Maria Braun (1979), as Willi Klenze
- Theodor Chindler (1979, TV miniseries), as Clemens Koch
- The Great Runaway (1979, TV miniseries), as Mr. Adam
- Reiseabrechnung (1980, TV Movie)
- Berlin Alexanderplatz (1980, TV miniseries), as Reinhold
- Lili Marleen (1981), as Aaron
- Ente oder Trente (1982)
- Privalov's Millions (1982, TV miniseries), as Loskutow
- Die Matrosen von Kronstadt (1983, TV Movie), as Petritschenko
- Super (1984), as Police Officer Hilpert
- Chinese Boxes (1984), as Zwemmer
- Bartolome oder Die Rückkehr der weißen Götter (1985, TV Movie), as Bartolomé de las Casas
- Mata Hari (1985), as Wolff
- Verworrene Bilanzen (1985, TV Movie), as Karl M. Kronen
- Ein Fall für zwei: Fluchtgeld (1985, TV series episode), as Hans Beckers
- Die Mitläufer (1985)
- Otto – Der Film (1985), as Sonnemann
- Die Schwärmer (1985, TV Movie), as Stader
- Das Gehirn zu Pferde (1986, TV Movie), as The Playwright
- Of Pure Blood (1986, TV Movie), as Paul Bergmann
- Franza (1986, TV Movie), as Captain
- The Winner Takes All (1987, TV Movie), as Ulrich Vogtmann
- Game, Set and Match (1988, TV series), as Eric Stinnes
- Schön war die Zeit (1988), as Franz Bauer
- Ein Fall für zwei: Seitensprung (1989, TV series episode), as Markus Meyer
- Blaues Blut: Tödliches Wochenende (1990, TV series episode), as Mr. Mannheim
- Wings of Fame (1990), as Zlatogorski
- Drehort Pfarrhaus (1990, TV miniseries), as Pfarrer Achim Hollweg
- La piovra, season 5 (1990, TV miniseries), as Friar Gillo
- Frederick Forsyth Presents: Death Has a Bad Reputation (1990, TV Movie), as Rodimstev
- Night of the Fox (1990, TV Movie), as Hofer
- Elfenbein (1991, TV Movie), as Nicholas Messier
- Ich schenk dir die Sterne (1991), as Robert Dallburg
- The Mistake (1992), as Jacob Alain
- Die Zeit danach (1992)
- Space Rangers (1993, TV Series, 6 episodes), as Colonel Erich Weiss
- Colpo di coda (1993, TV miniseries), as Pierre
- Novalis: The Blue Flower (1993), as Sophie's Father
- Das Sahara-Projekt (1993, TV miniseries), as Collani
- Abraham (1993, TV miniseries), as Eliezer
- Polizeiruf 110: Arme Schweine (1994, TV Series episode), as Hannes Hellwig
- Beckmann und Markowski (1994–1999, TV Series, 3 episodes), as Beckmann
- Baldipata (1995, TV Movie), as Alexander
- Die Falle (1995, TV Movie), as Hasso
- Wolffs Revier: Taekwon-Do (1995, TV Series episode), as Johnny Reschke
- Ein letzter Wille (1995, TV Movie), as Paul Elling
- Institute Benjamenta (1995), as Johannes Benjamenta
- Tatort: Der König kehrt zurück (1995, TV Series episode), as Harry Mucher
- GoldenEye (1995), as General Arkady Ourumov
- Brüder auf Leben und Tod (1996, TV Movie), as Renato Calvi
- The Ogre (1996), as Chief Forester
- La casa dove abitava Corinne (1996, TV Movie), as Michele Wolf
- Millennium: The Hand of St. Sebastian (1997, TV Series episode), as Josef Heim
- Tales of the South Seas: Paradise Regained (1998, TV Series episode), as Gunter
- Am I Beautiful? (1998), as Herbert
- Die Fremde in meiner Brust (1998, TV Movie), as Richard Keller
- Black Ice (1998, TV Movie), as Kurt Wallmann
- Asterix and Obelix vs. Caesar (1999), as Julius Caesar
- Balzac (1999, TV Movie), as Count Hanski
- Teuflischer Engel (2000, TV Movie), as Henry Martens
- Mary Magdalene (2000, TV Movie), as Herod Antipas
- Proof of Life (2000), as Eric Kessler
- Die Cleveren: Arzt und Dämon (2002, TV Series episode), as Dr. Brendel
- Der Solist: In eigener Sache (2002, TV Series episode), as Martin Krohn
- The Gathering Storm (2002, TV Movie), as Friedrich von Schroder
- Nancy & Frank – A Manhattan Love Story (2002), as Paul von Bernwarth
- Entrusted (2003, TV Movie), as Thomas von Gall
- Imperium: Augustus (2003, TV Movie), as Cicero
- Sams in Gefahr (2003), as Schulrat Aschenbrenner
- Renzo e Lucia (2004, TV miniseries), as Count Sagrato
- Die schöne Braut in Schwarz (2004, TV Movie), as Aldo Caldini
- Julie, chevalier de Maupin (2004, TV Movie), as Duc d'Armagnac
- Donna Leon: Acqua Alta (2004, TV series episode), as Carmello La Capra
- Cowgirl (2004), as Hans Krahl
- The Piano Tuner of Earthquakes (2005), as Dr. Emmanuel Droz
- A Pirate's Heart (2006, TV Movie), as Konrad von Wallenrod
- Flood (2007), as Arthur Moyes
- Das zweite Leben (2007, TV Movie), as Robert Kreutzer
- Final Proclamation (2008, TV Movie), as Paolo Naldini
- John Rabe (2009), as Oskar Trautmann
- Flores negras (2009), as Curtis
- Rumpelstiltskin (2009, TV Movie), as King Gustav
- Aghet – Ein Völkermord (2010, docudrama, TV Movie), as General Kress von Kressenstein
- Life Is Too Long (2010), as Georg Maria Stahl
- Die Löwin (2012, TV Movie), as Jo
- A World Beyond (2013, TV Movie), as Dr. Jan Kersebohm
- Ruby Red (2013), as Dr. White (final film role)

=== Audiobooks ===
- Gottfried John reads: Die toten Seelen by Nikolai Gogol. 2006, ISBN 978-3-7831-2794-2.
- Gottfried John reads: Die Stunden by Michael Cunningham. 2007, ISBN 978-3-86604-759-4.

=== Written works ===
- Bekenntnisse eines Unerzogenen, autobiography, publisher: Econ, Berlin 2000, ISBN 978-3430151092.
- Das fünfte Wort, novel, publisher: Ullstein, Berlin 2003, ISBN 978-3550084270.

== Nominations and awards ==
- 1982: Großer Hersfeld-Preis for his role as Jago in Othello
- 1999: Bavarian Film Awards, Best Actor
- 2000: Bavarian Film Awards for Asterix & Obelix Take on Caesar (Bester Nebendarsteller)
- 2004: Euregio Filmball – Best Euregio-Actor
- 2006: DIVA-Award – European Award (Hall of Fame)
- 2017: RF Hall of Fame
