= Mother Küsters' Trip to Heaven =

1975 film by Rainer Werner Fassbinder

- Theatrical release poster
- Directed by: Rainer Werner Fassbinder
- Written by: Rainer Werner Fassbinder; Kurt Raab; Heinrich Zille
- Starring: Brigitte Mira; Ingrid Caven; Karlheinz Böhm; Margit Carstensen; Armin Meier; Irm Hermann
- Cinematography: Michael Ballhaus
- Edited by: Thea Eymesz
- Music by: Peer Raben
- Distributed by: Tango Film
- Release date: 7 July 1975
- Running time: 103 minutes
- Country: West Germany
- Language: German

Mother Küsters' Trip to Heaven (German: Mutter Küsters' Fahrt zum Himmel) is a 1975 German film written and directed by Rainer Werner Fassbinder. It stars Brigitte Mira, Ingrid Caven, Karlheinz Böhm and Margit Carstensen. The film was shot over 20 days between February and March 1975 in Frankfurt am Main. The film drew on both Sirk-style melodramas and Weimar era workers' films to tell a political coming of age story.

== Plot ==
Emma Küsters, a working-class woman, lives in Frankfurt with her son and daughter-in-law. While doing cottage industry work assembling electric plugs, Frau Küsters learns that her husband Hermann (a tire-factory worker for twenty years) has killed his supervisor or his supervisor's son and then committed suicide. It later becomes apparent that Mr. Küsters had become temporarily insane after hearing layoff announcements.

A group of reporters take advantage of the grieving Mother Küsters to sensationalize the deaths. Finding no solace from her son Ernst, daughter-in-law Helene, who promptly go on holiday, or daughter, Küsters turns to Karl and Marianne Thälmann, two members of what turns out to be the German Communist Party (DKP). They introduce themselves at Hermann's funeral, and invite her to their home, which Marianne had inherited.

The Communists see Küsters's husband as a 'revolutionary' and a misguided victim of capitalism, but she is initially unpersuaded; her husband saw communists as troublemakers. Her daughter Corinna advises her mother to have nothing to do with them, and points out the differing conditions enjoyed by the authorities and the people in the East. An article on the tragedy by Niemeyer, a photojournalist who had earlier shown a particular interest in the family, appears in a magazine. Emma finds the article objectionable, but her daughter, who has embarked on an affair with Niemeyer, defends him on 'earning a living' grounds. At the factory, Emma Küsters finds that the company pension scheme will not apply in her case; the workers' council and the company board are at one on the issue. Her daughter leaves, and Ernst and Helene, newly returned from holiday, announce they are to set up home on their own. Helene, expecting a child, does not get along with her sister-in-law.

Emma Küsters now joins the Communist Party, having found Karl's newspaper article more sympathetic, but after Küsters speaks at her first DKP political gathering she meets a young male paper seller who claims to really have her interests at heart in clearing her husband's name. He gives her his contact details. She quickly grows impatient with the communists' passive tactics; they have to campaign in the forthcoming elections, Karl explains. She connects with a small group of anarchists, who, though even smaller in number than the communists, claim to have more spirit.

There are two endings to the film:

- The anarchists' leading member, Horst Knab, demands to see Niemeyer at the magazine's offices but the secretary says he is unavailable. The editor suggests Küsters send in a letter which he might publish. The anarchists take the staff hostage at gunpoint, including Niemeyer, now living with Corinna, who arrives unaware how far the situation has developed. The anarchists demand the release of all political prisoners in West Germany, a Mercedes 600 to take them to the airport and a Boeing 707 to take them out of the country. Küsters looks horrified at the anarchists' demands but is killed in a subsequent clash with the police. Knab kills Linke (the editor) but Knab is also shot. (The last stages of the narrative are detailed with captions.)
- In another ending (primarily used for the American edition), Niemeyer is at the magazine offices but as the staff start to leave at the end of their working day, the two anarchists grow bored with the sit-down strike and leave with Küsters remaining. After being told by her daughter Corinna, clearly now living with Niemeyer who has 'phoned her, that she is making herself ridiculous, Emma Küsters meets the friendly janitor of the newspaper's offices, whose wife is dead. The widow and widower leave to have dinner together, apparently beginning a romantic relationship.

Fassbinder's film criticizes the bloodthirst of the 1970s German media in a similar manner to The Lost Honour of Katharina Blum (directed by Volker Schlöndorff and Margarethe von Trotta). However, Fassbinder's film goes further by criticizing the overwhelming selfishness present in contemporary society. Nearly everyone who Mother Küsters encounters is self-serving and unconcerned with comforting her. Fassbinder also clearly criticizes the small German Communist Party's moderation and "armchair activism".

== Cast ==
- Brigitte Mira – Emma Küsters
- Ingrid Caven – Corinna Corinne, aka Corinna Küsters
- Armin Meier – Ernst Küsters
- Irm Hermann – Helene Küsters
- Karlheinz Böhm – Karl Tillmann
- Margit Carstensen – Frau Marianne Tillmann
- Gottfried John – Niemeyer
- Matthias Fuchs – Horst Knab
- Kurt Raab as Gustav
- Peter Kern – Night club owner

== Bibliography ==
- Braad Thomsen, Christian, Fassbinder: Life and Work of a Provocative Genius, University of Minnesota Press, 2004, ISBN 0-8166-4364-4
- Gerhardt, Christina, "Fassbinder's Mother Küsters Goes to Heaven in a Genealogy of the Workers' Films," Film Criticism 41.1 (February–March 2017).
