= Lili Marleen (film) =

1981 film

- Theatrical release poster
- Directed by: Rainer Werner Fassbinder
- Screenplay by: Rainer Werner Fassbinder; Manfred Purzer; Joshua Sinclair; Werner Ushkurat
- Based on: The Heavens Have Many Colors by Lale Andersen
- Produced by: Luggi Waldleitner; Enzo Peri; Horst Wendlandt
- Starring: Hanna Schygulla
- Cinematography: Xaver Schwarzenberger; Michael Ballhaus
- Edited by: Rainer Werner Fassbinder; Juliane Lorenz
- Music by: Peer Raben
- Release date: 14 January 1981
- Running time: 120 minutes
- Country: West Germany
- Language: German

Lili Marleen is a 1981 West German drama film directed by Rainer Werner Fassbinder that stars Hanna Schygulla, Giancarlo Giannini, and Mel Ferrer. Set in the time of the Third Reich, the film recounts the love affair between a German singer who becomes the darling of the nation, based on Lale Andersen, and a Swiss conductor, based on Rolf Liebermann, who is active in saving his fellow Jews. Though the screenplay uses the autobiographical novel Der Himmel hat viele Farben (The Heavens Have Many Colors) by Lale Andersen, her last husband, Arthur Beul, said the film bears little relation to her real life.

== Plot ==
In Switzerland, an aspiring German singer called Willie is in love with Robert, a trainee conductor who is Jewish. His family are part of a network enabling Jews and their money to find safety in neutral Switzerland. Fearing that the network could be endangered by Robert's involvement with a German woman, his wealthy father has her deported.

Back in Germany, Willie comes under the protection of Henkel, a high Nazi official who advances her career. Her song “Lili Marleen” becomes the favourite of the armed forces, making her rich and famous. Under a false identity, Robert enters Germany to try and recruit her for the network. She still loves him and provides him with photo evidence of Nazi death camps in Poland. When he is caught by the Gestapo, she comes under suspicion but is cleared. Robert's father negotiates his return to Switzerland, where he is married to a suitable Jewish girl.

At the end of the war, Willie is able to get into Switzerland, where she is delighted to attend Robert's first concert, but there is no hope of renewing their romance.

== Cast ==
- Hanna Schygulla as Willie
- Giancarlo Giannini as Robert
- Mel Ferrer as David Mendelsson
- Karl-Heinz von Hassel as Roman Henkel
- Erik Schumann as Joachim von Strehlow
- Hark Bohm as Hugo Taschner
- Gottfried John as Aaron Nolte
- Karin Baal as Anna Lederer
- Christine Kaufmann as Miriam
- Udo Kier as Heinrich Drewitz
- Roger Fritz as Christoph Kauffmann
- Rainer Will as Edgar Bernt
- Raúl Gimenez as Emil Blonsky
- Adrian Hoven as Hellmuth Ginsberg
- Willy Harlander as Michael Prosel

== Awards and nominations ==
Of the 23 theatrical films that Fassbinder directed, Lili Marleen was the only one that Germany submitted to the academy to be considered for a Best Foreign Language Film nomination. While a German production, the film was one of the few that Fassbinder shot in English. Ultimately, the film was not nominated. It failed to receive 1981 German Film Award nomination in the Best (feature) film category.

== See also ==
- List of submissions to the 54th Academy Awards for Best Foreign Language Film
- List of German submissions for the Academy Award for Best Foreign Language Film
