= Isolde Barth =

German actress (born 1948)

- Born: Isolde Maria Theresia Barth; 24 August 1948; Maxdorf, Rhineland-Palatinate (Germany)
- Education: Folkwang University of the Arts
- Occupation: Actress
- Years active: since 1968
- Website: www.management-lautenbacher.de/isolde-barth.htm

Isolde Barth (born 24 August 1948) is a German movie, theater and television actress. She appeared in over 60 films between 1968 and 2013. In 1968 she first appeared in a minor role in the German comedy 24 Hour Lover. She also appeared in Group Portrait with a Lady (1977), directed by Aleksandar Petrović and starring Romy Schneider.

== Career ==
Isolde Maria Theresa Barth played already during her school time at Ursulinen-Gymnasium Mannheim small roles at National Theatre Mannheim. She began her acting training at Staatlichen Hochschule für Musik und darstellende Kunst (University of Music and Performing Arts) Stuttgart and then moved on to the Folkwang University of the Arts Essen. She graduated in summer 1970.

Barth is an internationally known actress. Among many movies she played in the mini-series Holocaust (1978) for American television. She played in Ingmar Bergman's The Serpent's Egg (1977), several productions by Rainer Werner Fassbinder, and in The Young Indiana Jones Chronicles (1991) which was created by George Lucas. In addition to her film roles Isolde Barth was also seen repeatedly in German and French TV productions and series.

In 2007 Isolde Barth was inducted into the Deutsche Filmakademie. Since 2009 she is a member of the jury of the Bavarian Film Awards.

== Personal life ==
Isolde Barth lives in Munich.

== Credits ==
=== Film ===
This is only a selection, not a complete list of Barth's movies:

Year	Title	Role	Director	Notes
1974	Schattenreiter	Schneewittchen	George Moorse	
1975	Flacons D'Or	Isolde	Werner Schroeter	
1977	The Serpent's Egg		Ingmar Bergman	
1978	The Unicorn	Maria	Peter Patzak	
1978	In a Year of 13 Moons	Sybille	Rainer Werner Fassbinder	
1980	Exit... nur keine Panik	Gerti	Franz Novotny	
1980	Purity of Heart		Robert van Ackeren	
1981	Lola	Mrs. Völker	Rainer Werner Fassbinder	
1989	Pestalozzi's Mountain	Rosalia	Peter von Gunten	
1990	Quiet Days in Clichy	Ania Regentag	Claude Chabrol	
1990	Dr. M	Mrs. Sehr	Claude Chabrol	
1991	Malina	Mother	Werner Schroeter	
1992	Long Conversation with a Bird	Aunt Mathilde	Krzysztof Zanussi	
2000	Merci pour le chocolat	Pauline	Claude Chabrol	

=== Television ===
Year	Title	Role	Director	Notes
1977	Holocaust	Eva	Marvin J. Chomsky	
1990	Touch and Die	Gina	Piernico Solinas	
1991	The Young Indiana Jones Chronicles	Helene Schweitzer	Simon Wincer / George Lucas	

=== Stage ===
Year	Title	Director	Notes
1975	Die bitteren Tränen der Petra von Kant & Karin	Rainer Werner Fassbinder	Schweizer Tournee Theater
2007–2008	Baal	Hans Neuenfels	Münchner Volkstheater
