= Juliane Lorenz =

German film editor (born 1957)

Juliane Lorenz (born 2 August 1957) is a German film editor best known for her work with and relationship to director Rainer Werner Fassbinder. Lorenz is the head of the Fassbinder Foundation, an organization that seeks to preserve and promote the filmmaker's legacy. She has authored or edited several books on the director's life and work, and has directed a documentary on the same subject.

== Biography ==
Lorenz was born in Mannheim, West Germany on 2 August 1957. Lorenz's stepfather was a filmmaker.

== The Fassbinder Foundation ==
Following Fassbinder's death, all the copyrights to Fassbinder's works were inherited by his mother, Liselotte Eder and Fassbinder's father Dr. Helmuth Fassbinder. Due to the large volume of works involved, including many plays and 40 films, Eder set up the Fassbinder Foundation in 1986. Helmut Fassbinder then gave his share of rights to the Foundation and received a compensation. Lorenz was chosen by Eder in 1991 to take over the Foundation and became in 1993 by will of Eder (after her death) the legal heir of the estate which is administrated by the Rainer Werner Fassbinder Foundation.

The organization seeks to protect and promote the director's legacy around the world. Lorenz has since authored or edited several books on the director's life and work, and directed a documentary, Life, Love & Celluloid, on the subject.

Her control over the organization, as well as statements she has made about the director's personal life, have made her a controversial figure. In particular, Lorenz and Ingrid Caven, briefly Fassbinder's legal wife, have been in conflict over their former partner for many years.
