= Fünf letzte Tage =

- Directed by: Percy Adlon
- Written by: Percy Adlon
- Based on: Lives of Sophie Scholl and Else Gebel
- Produced by: Eleonore Adlon
- Starring: Lena Stolze; Irm Hermann; Michael Cornelius
- Cinematography: Horst Lermer
- Edited by: Clara Fabry
- Music by: Franz Schubert
- Release date: 16 October 1982
- Running time: 112 minutes
- Country: West Germany
- Language: German

Fünf letzte Tage (Five Last Days) is a West German film about the last days in 1943 of Sophie Scholl. Scholl was a member of the anti-war group Weiße Rose. She was executed for her non-violent activities by the National Socialist regime during the Second World War. The film was directed by Percy Adlon, who also wrote the script. Eleonore Adlon was the producer, and Horst Lermer the cinematographer. The music was taken from Franz Schubert. It was released on 16 October 1982, and was first shown on public television on 20 February 1983. The film received national and international awards for actors and direction.

== Plot ==
While the later film Sophie Scholl – Die letzten Tage (2005) deals with the last days of Sophie Scholl from her own perspective, Percy Adlon looked at her last five days from the perspective of Else Gebel, a Christian socialist imprisoned with her. The film is focused on the women's situation, exhaustion and relationship, and not on the Gestapo interrogations and the court process.

== Roles ==
- Lena Stolze: Sophie Scholl
- Irm Hermann: Else Gebel
- Michael Cornelius: Hans Scholl
- Willi Spindler: Civil servant G.
- Hans Hirschmüller: Mahr
- Philip Arp: Philip
- Joachim Bernhard: Watchman 1
- Ossi Eckmüller
- Hans Stadlbauer: Watchman 2
- Gert Burkard: Public defender

== Reception ==
The Lexikon des internationalen Films noted: "Strict, reserved and detached, a character study in the style of a psychological chamber play that does without narrative embellishment and spectacular dramatisation." ("Streng, zurückhaltend und distanziert inszenierte Charakterstudie im Stil eines psychologischen Kammerspiels, die auf narrative Ausschmückung und spektakuläre Dramatisierung verzichtet.") The journal Cinema described the film as a "brittle chamber play in pale colours" ("... sprödes Kammerspiel in bleichen Farben").

== Awards ==
- Deutscher Filmpreis 1983:
  - Filmband in Gold in the category "Best acting" for Irm Hermann
  - Filmband in Gold in the category "Best acting" for Lena Stolze
  - Filmband in Silver in the category "Full-length drama film"
- Venice Film Festival 1982: OCIC-Preis
- Jugendfilmfestival Cannes 1983: Prix des Jeunes
- Bayerischer Filmpreis: Regiepreis

== See also ==
- Die Weiße Rose (film), released 24 September 1982, where Lena Stolze also portrayed Sophie Scholl
