= Irm Hermann =

German actress (1942–2020)

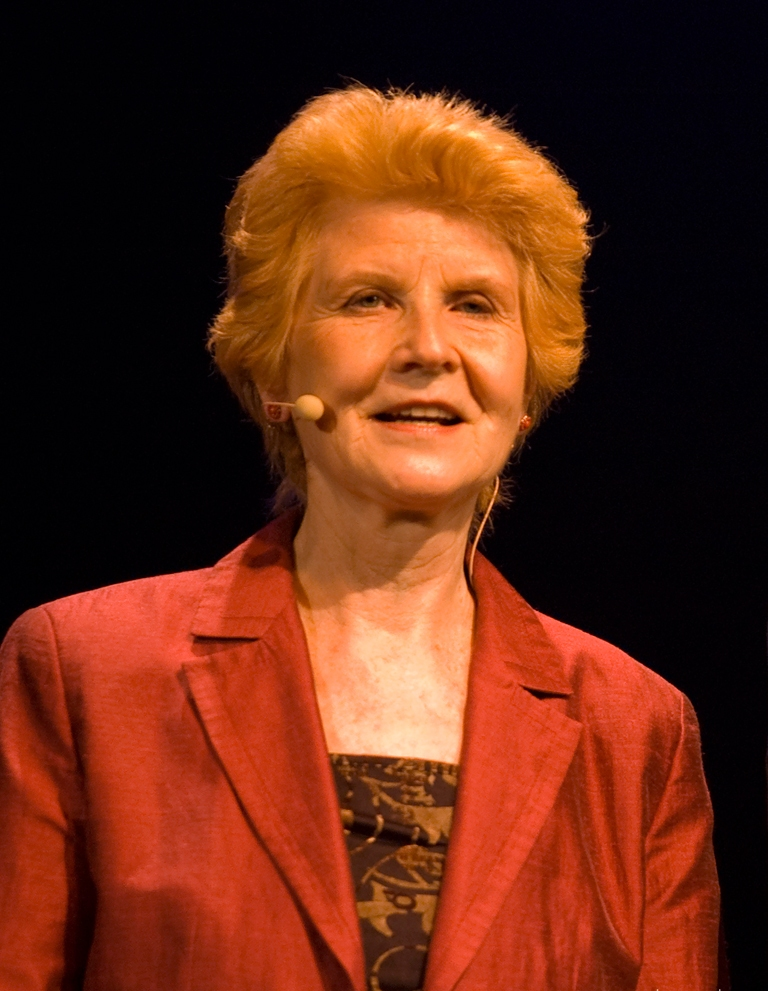
- Irm Hermann in 2008
- Born: 4 October 1942; Munich, German Reich
- Died: 26 May 2020 (aged 77); Berlin, Germany
- Occupations: Actress; Assistant director
- Years active: 1966–2018
- Awards: Deutscher Filmpreis

Irmgard Hermann (4 October 1942 – 26 May 2020) was a German actress. She worked in film, television, and the stage, appearing in over 160 film and television productions. She was discovered, without formal training, by Rainer Werner Fassbinder who cast her in many of his films. She was awarded the Deutscher Filmpreis for playing Irmgard Epp in Fassbinder's The Merchant of Four Seasons, and again for appearing as Else Gebel, a woman in prison with Sophie Scholl, in Percy Adlon's Fünf letzte Tage.

== Career ==
Born in Munich, Hermann became a publishing clerk after finishing school and worked as a secretary for ADAC. She met Rainer Werner Fassbinder in 1966, who convinced her to quit her job to work with him although she lacked formal training as an actress. The same year, Hermann made her debut in Fassbinder's short film The City Tramp (Der Stadtstreicher), and then went on to play in 19 of Fassbinder's films, including Die bitteren Tränen der Petra von Kant (The Bitter Tears of Petra von Kant, 1972). She was usually cast as a frustrated, stuffy (spießig) woman. Her one leading role in his films, Irmgard Epp in the 1971 Händler der vier Jahreszeiten (The Merchant of Four Seasons), won her the Deutscher Filmpreis award. She was a member of Fassbinder's complicated professional and personal entourage, and became one of his confidantes, but the relationship also involved abusive behaviour by Fassbinder towards her; after his death, she said he had been physically abusive.

In the mid-1970s, Hermann broke with Fassbinder and moved to Berlin, where her career developed. She played in numerous film and television productions with directors such as Tankred Dorst, Werner Herzog, Hans W. Geißendörfer and Christoph Schlingensief. Her performance as Else Gebel, a woman in prison with the resistance fighter Sophie Scholl, in Percy Adlon's 1982 Fünf letzte Tage (Last Five Days) was again honoured with a Deutscher Filmpreis in 1983. She liked to play in comedies such as Loriot's 1991 Pappa Ante Portas, Hape Kerkeling's 1996 Willi und die Windzors (as a fictionalized version of Queen Elizabeth II) and Rudolf Thome's 1999 Paradiso: Seven Days with Seven Women. Paradiso won a Silver Bear at the 2000 Berlinale for artistic achievement (künstlerische Leistung). She also appeared in Rosa von Praunheim's film Fassbinder's Women (2000).

Overall, she appeared in over 160 film and television productions until 2018. She played on stage at the Berlin Volksbühne, with the Berliner Ensemble, and at the Hamburger Schauspielhaus.

=== Personal life ===
Hermann was married to Dietmar Roberg, an author of children's books; they had two sons, Franz Tizian and Fridolin.

Hermann died on 26 May 2020 in Berlin, at the age of 77, after a short serious illness, according to her agent.

== Awards ==
- German Film Award
- German Audio Book Prize

== Filmography (selection) ==
Hermann's film appearances included:

=== Fassbinder ===
- Katzelmacher (1969) as Elisabeth
- Warum läuft Herr R. Amok?) (Why Does Herr R. Run Amok?, 1970) as Neighbour
- Der amerikanische Soldat (The American Soldier, 1970) as Whore
- Pioniere in Ingolstadt (Pioneers in Ingolstadt, after Marieluise Fleißer's play, 1972) as Irmgard Epp
- Händler der vier Jahreszeiten (The Merchant of Four Seasons, 1972) as Irmgard Epp
- Die bitteren Tränen der Petra von Kant (The Bitter Tears of Petra von Kant, 1972) as Marlene
- Jail Bait after the play by Franz Xaver Kroetz (1972) as police woman
- Acht Stunden sind kein Tag (Eight Hours Don't Make a Day, 1973, TV miniseries) as Irmgard Erlkönig
- Effi Briest (1974) as Johanna
- Faustrecht der Freiheit (Fox and His Friends, 1974) as Madame Cherie
- Angst essen Seele auf (Ali: Fear Eats the Soul, 1974) as Krista
- Mutter Küsters' Fahrt zum Himmel (Mother Küsters' Trip to Heaven, 1975) as Helene Küsters
- Angst vor der Angst (1975) as Lore
- Berlin Alexanderplatz (1980, TV miniseries) as Trude
- Lili Marleen (1980) as Nurse

=== Geißendörfer ===
- Sternsteinhof (The Sternstein Manor, 1976) as Sali
- Der Zauberberg after Thomas Mann's novel (1982) as Fräulein Engelhart

=== Werner Herzog ===
- Woyzeck after Büchner's drama (1979) as Margret

=== Percy Adlon ===
- Fünf letzte Tage (1982) as Else Gebel

=== Ulrike Ottinger ===
- Dorian Gray in the Mirror of the Yellow Press (1984) as Passat
- Joan of Arc of Mongolia (1989) as Fräulein Müller-Vohwinkel

=== Schlingensief ===
- Das deutsche Kettensägenmassaker (The German Chainsaw Massacre, 1990) as GDR borderwoman
- The 120 Days of Bottrop (1997) as Irm Hermann

=== Rudolf Thome ===
- Tiger-Stripe Woman Waits for Tarzan (1998) as Birgit Kirschstein
- Paradiso: Seven Days with Seven Women (2000) as Berenice

=== Other directors ===
- The Passenger – Welcome to Germany (1988) as concentration camp commander, directed by Thomas Brasch
- Pappa Ante Portas (1991) as Hedwig, directed by Loriot
- Zu treuen Händen (1995, TV film) as Isolde Krautinger
- Willi und die Windzors (1996, TV film) as Queen Elizabeth II, directed by Hape Kerkeling
- Die Affäre Semmeling (2002, TV mini series) as financial officer
- My Brother Is a Dog (2004) as Oma Gerda
- A Woman in Berlin (2008) as widow
- Faust Sonnengesang (2011) (voice)
- Vatertage – Opa über Nacht (2012) as Marianne Oberrotter
- Lotta (2012, TV series) as Frau Johansson
- The Rhino and the Dragonfly (2012) as Verlegerin
- Stuttgart Homicide (2012, TV series) as Ilse Vogelmann
- The Invention of Love (2012) as Johanna von Kirsch
- Fack ju Göhte 3 (2017) as Ploppi's grandma
- Labaule & Erben (2018, TV miniseries) as Marianne Labaule
