= Hilde Coppi =

German communist and resistance fighter

- Hilde Coppi in a humorous moment
- Born: Betti Gertrud Käthe Hilda Rake; 30 May 1909; Mitte, Berlin, German Empire
- Died: 5 August 1943 (aged 34); Plötzensee Prison, Berlin, Nazi Germany
- Occupation: Clerk
- Years active: 1933–1943
- Movement: Red Orchestra
- Spouse: Hans Coppi
- Children: 1 (Hans Coppi Jr.)

Betti Gertrud Käthe Hilda Coppi (née Rake; 30 May 1909 – 5 August 1943), known as Hilde Coppi, was a German communist in the resistance against the Nazi regime. She was a member of the anti-fascist resistance group that was called the Red Orchestra by the Abwehr. While she was pregnant in 1942, she was arrested and gave birth to her son in prison. She was sentenced to death by the secret People's Court in January 1943 and, after a seven month delay so that she could nurse her son, executed on 5 August 1943.

== Life ==
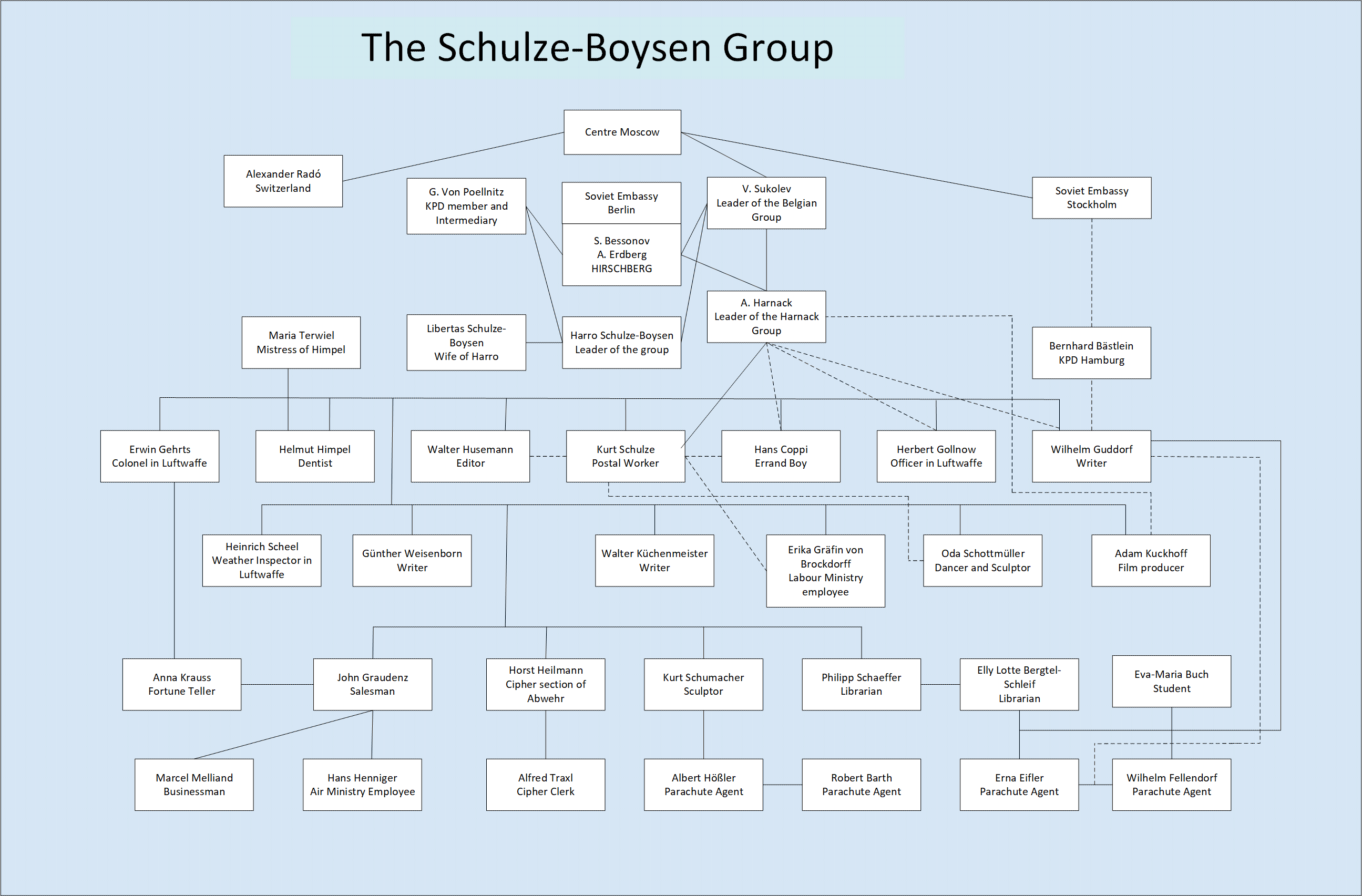
The Schulze-Boysen group in Germany

Betti Gertrud Käthe Hilda Rake was born in Berlin, and grew up in Mitte area of Berlin. Her mother ran a small leather shop. After finishing vocational school, she worked as a general practitioner's assistant through much of the 1930s.

== Career ==
Coppi was working in Berlin as a clerk at the Reich Insurance Institute for Clerical Workers when she got to know Hans Coppi, who had only just been released from prison. By 1933, Rake had contact with members of the Communist Party of Germany (KPD).

== Resistance ==
Together, Hilde and Hans Coppi – who wed on 14 June 1941 – hid persecution victims of the Nazi régime. During the war, Hilde Coppi listened to "Voice of Russia" (ie Radio Moscow) and shared the information broadcast over the radio with the Red Orchestra and other resistance groups. She also relayed greetings and any other signs of continued life heard on Radio Moscow from German prisoners of war to their kin. This was especially important, as Nazi propaganda had it that Soviet troops shot their enemies out of hand, and did not take prisoners. Moreover, she busied herself by broadcasting her group's messages through leaflets and stickers. She conducted a sticker campaign against the Nazis' anti-Soviet propaganda exhibition called The Soviet Paradise.

== Arrest ==
Coppi and her husband were both arrested on 12 September 1942, along with Hans' parents and brother, and Hilde's mother. Hilde was pregnant by this time, later giving birth to the couple's son at the Barnimstrasse women's prison on 27 November. On 22 December 1942, her husband was put to death, and Hilde, too, was sentenced to death in the new year, on 20 January. A petition for clemency was made in her case in July, but Hitler refused to grant it. The execution was delayed until August, so that she could nurse her child, Hans. On 5 August 1943, Hilde Coppi was beheaded at Plötzensee Prison in Berlin seven months after her husband.

After the end of the war, her son was raised by her husband's parents, Freda and Robert Coppi, in the garden colony Am Waldessaum. In 1950, the family moved to Karlshorst.

== In popular culture ==
Coppi was portrayed by Liv Lisa Fries in the 2024 film based on her life, From Hilde, With Love directed by Andreas Dresen. The film was screened at the 74th Berlin International Film Festival in February 2024, and released on 17 October 2024 in Germany.

== Awards and honours ==
- In the autobiographical novel, The Aesthetics of Resistance (1975-1981), German author Peter Weiss offers a portrayal a literary monument, in honour of the Coppi's.

== Gallery ==
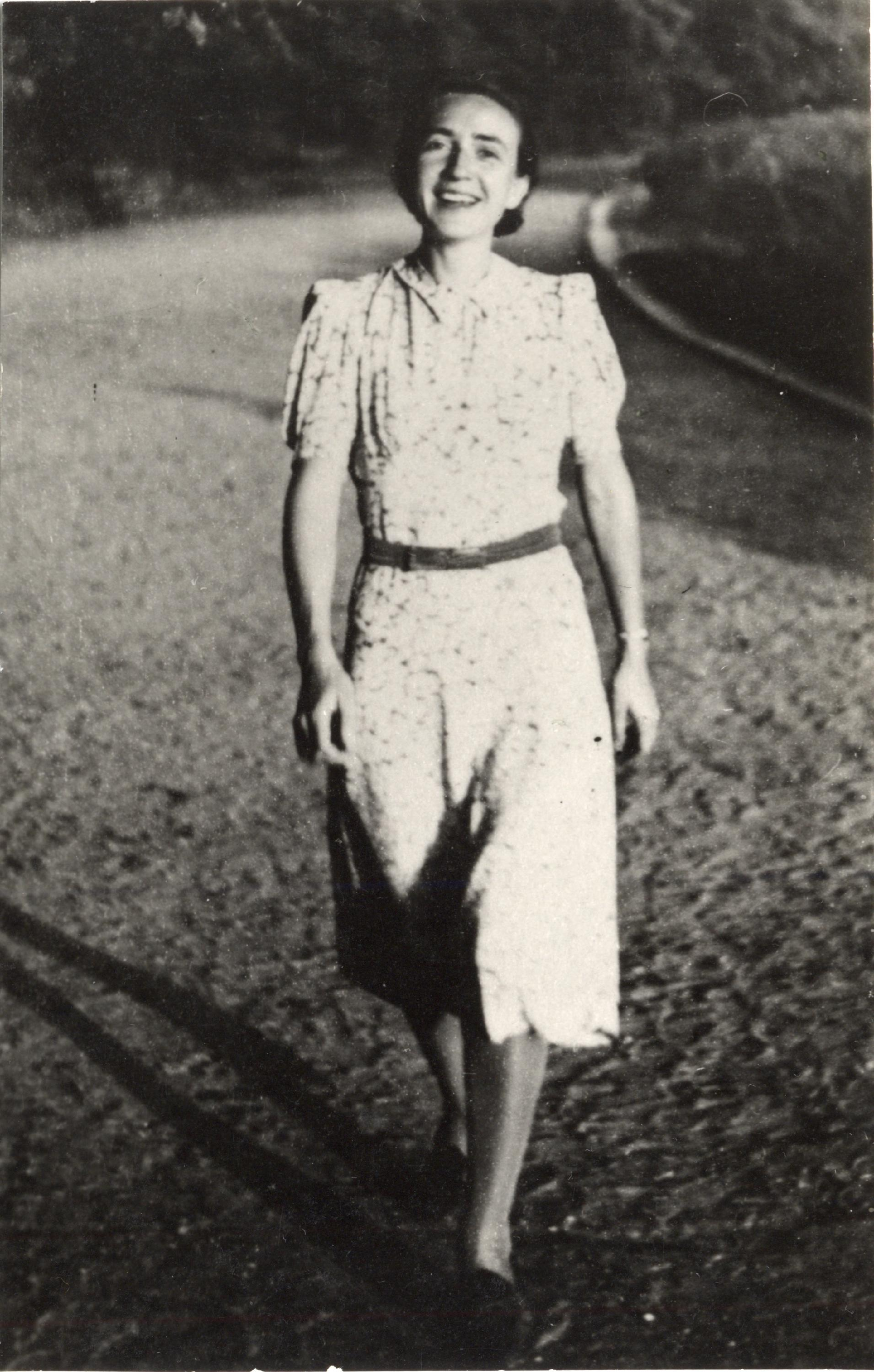
Hilde Coppi in happier times, walking in Treptower Park

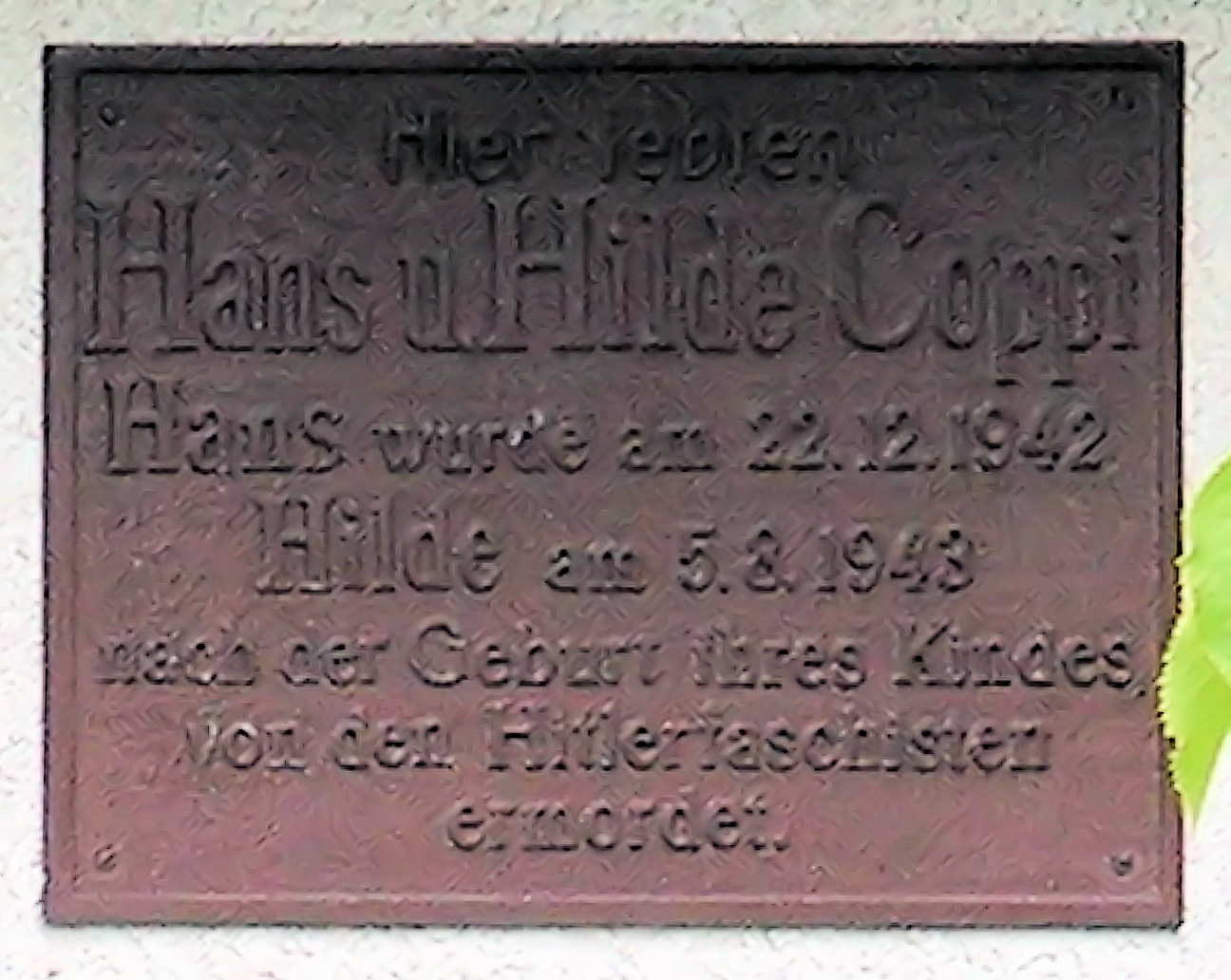
A memorial plaque for the couple Hans und Hilde Coppi at 23 Seidelstraße, Tegel

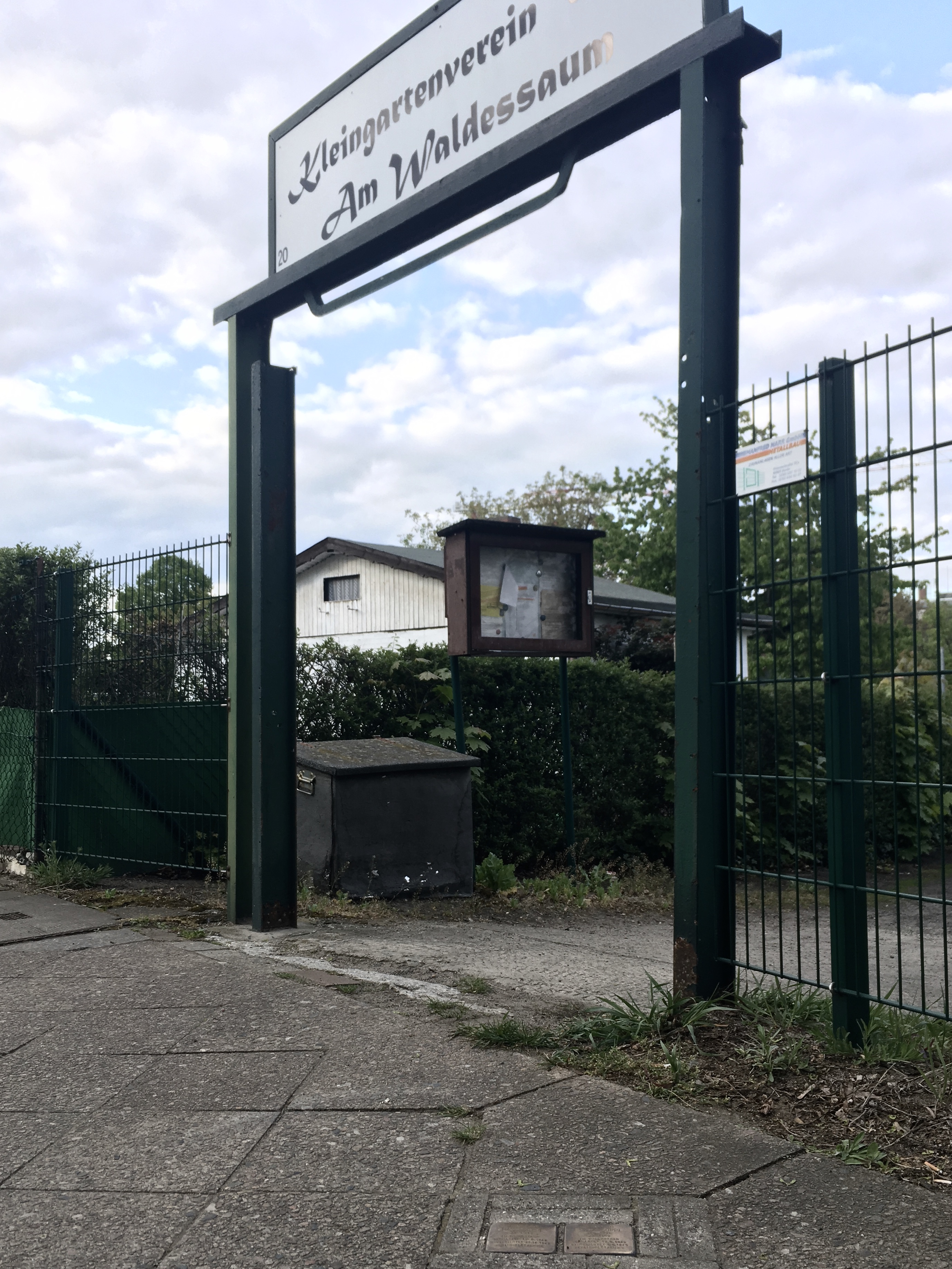
Stumbling block at the allotment gardens "Am Waldessaum" (close to lane 5) at 20 Seidelstraße, Tegel

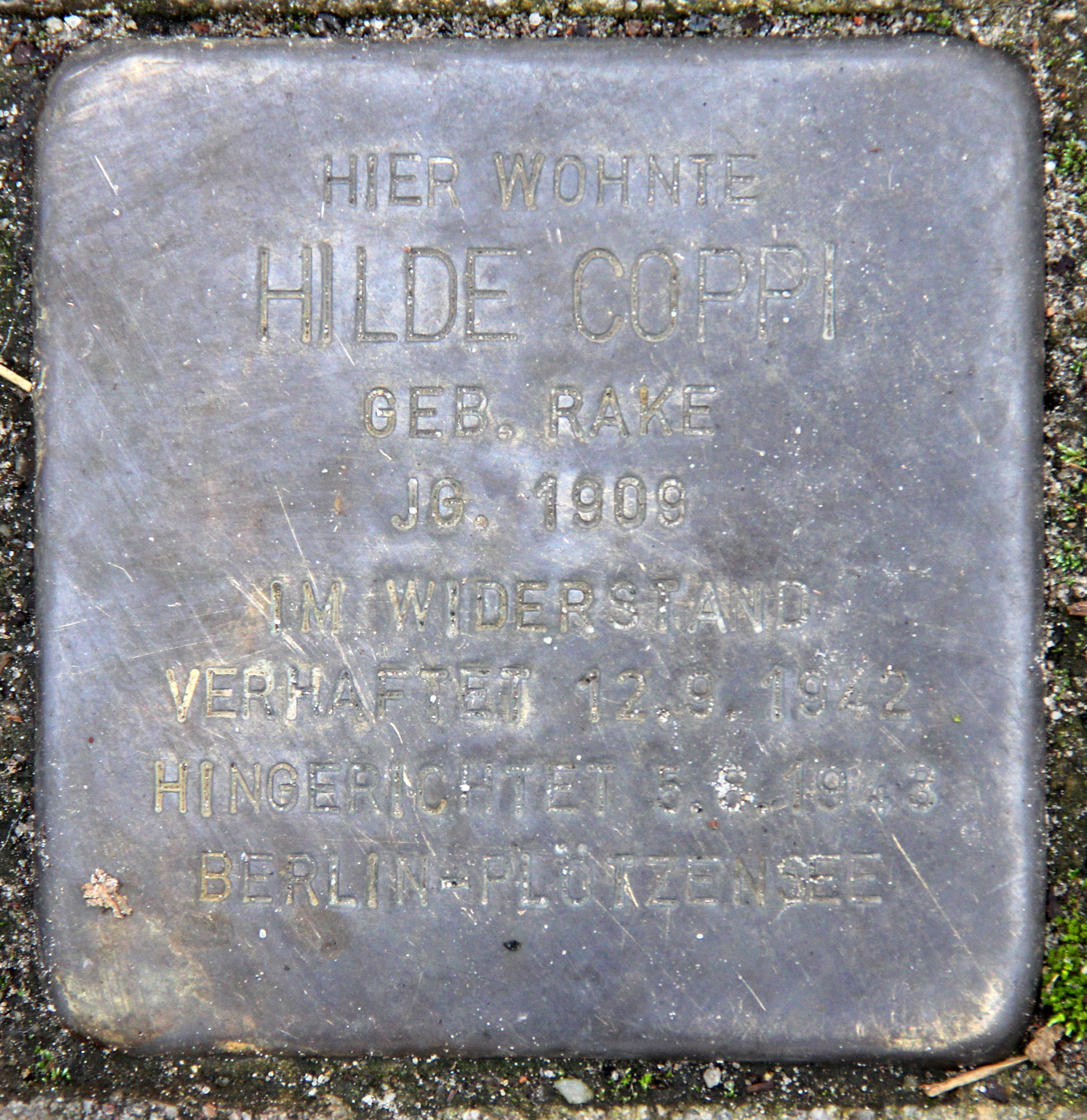
A closer look at the stumbling block

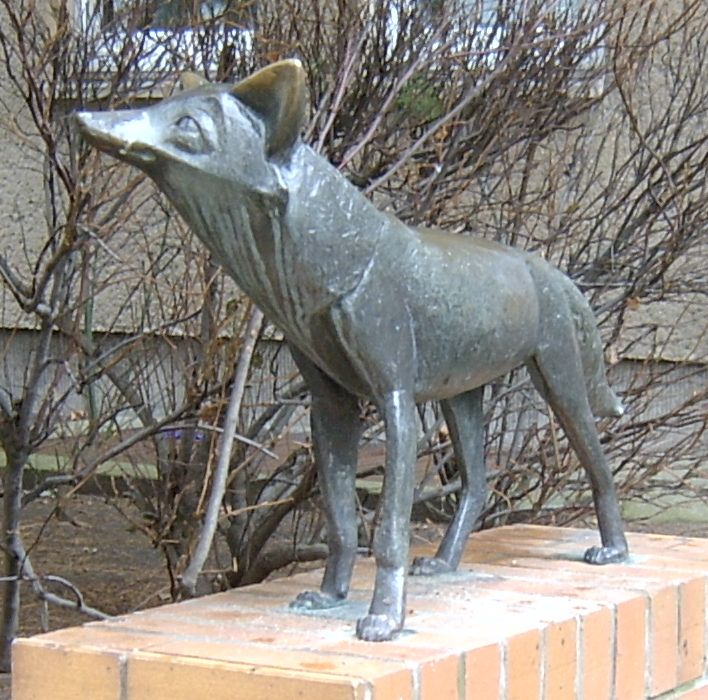
The fox by the sculptor Stephan Horota. It is located in front of the Hilde Coppi daycare centre in Rosengasse, Frankfurt. The sculpture, commission by the city council in the 1950s, is the only one the artist in Frankfurt

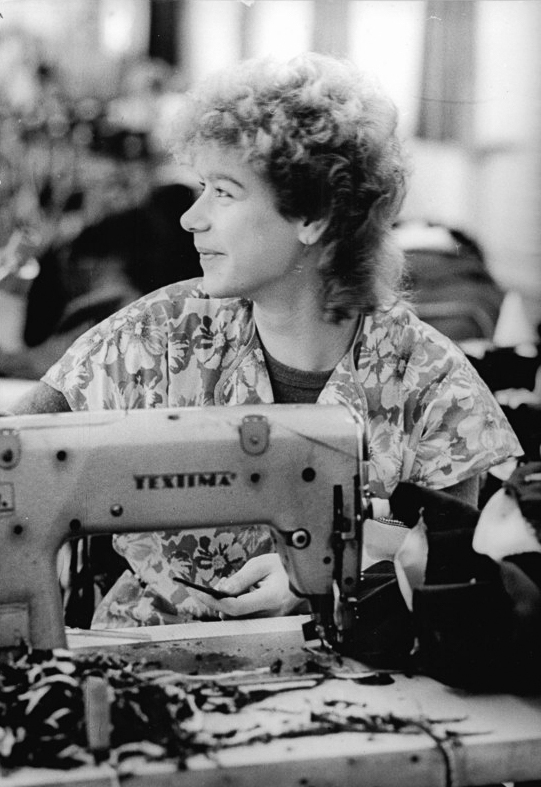
Andrea Schröter, one of the best seamstresses of the youth collective known as "Hilde Coppi"

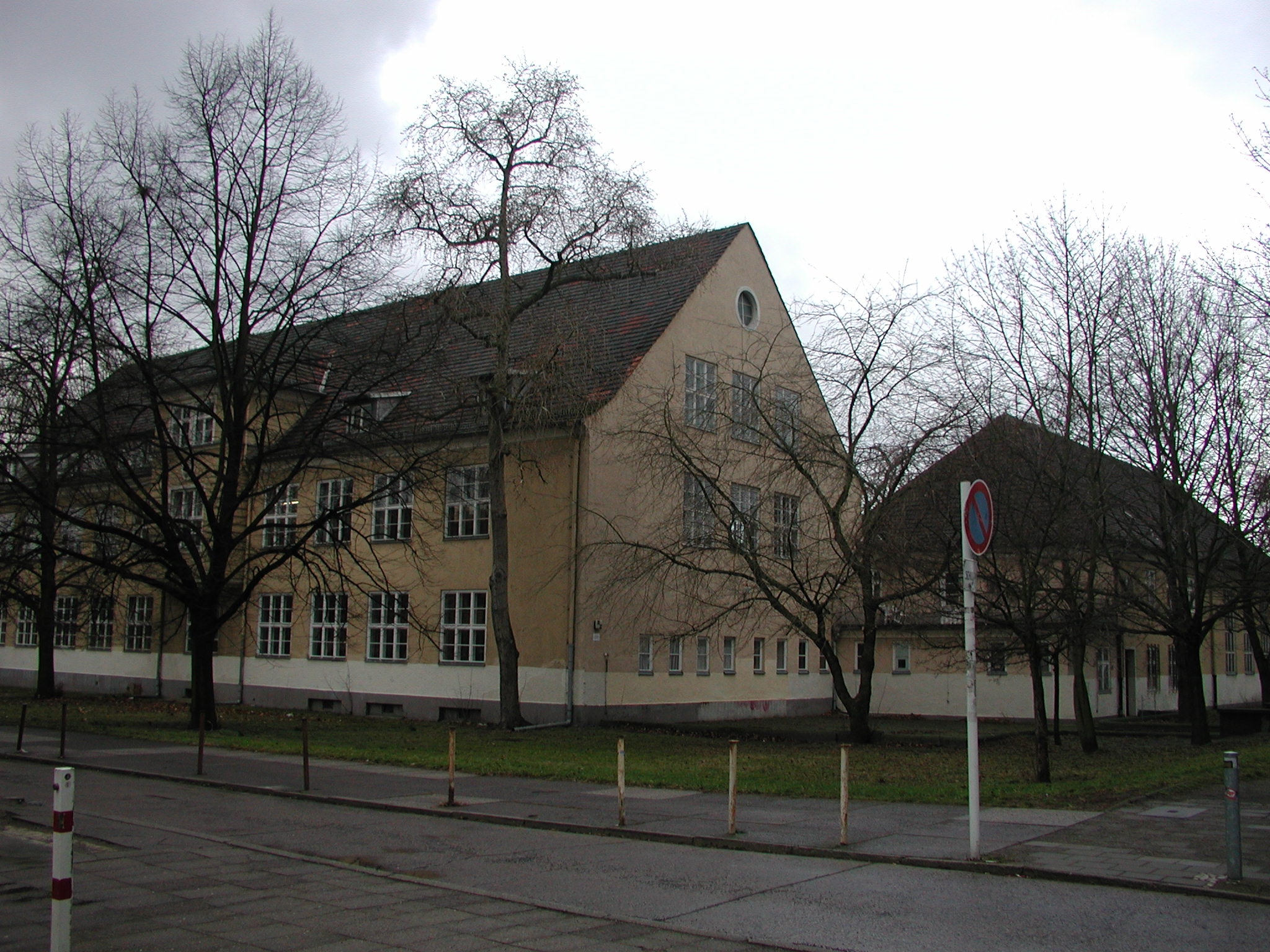
The Hans and Hilde High School ("Hans-und-Hilde-Coppi-Gymnasium") which was renamed in their honour in 1958

== See also ==
- Zentralfriedhof Friedrichsfelde The Socialist Memorial

== Literature ==
- Gilles Perrault: Auf den Spuren der Roten Kapelle. Rowohlt 1994.
- Rosiejka, Gert: Die Rote Kapelle. „Landesverrat“ als antifaschistischer Widerstand. – Mit einer Einführung von Heinrich Scheel. ergebnisse, Hamburg 1986, ISBN 3-925622-16-0.
- Peter Weiss setzte Hans und Hilde Coppi in seinem autobiographischen Roman [Die Ästhetik des Widerstands (1975–1981) ein literarisches Denkmal.
- Elfriede Brüning: … damit Du weiterlebst. Neues Leben, Berlin 1949, über die Geburt von Hans Coppi junior. Nemesis – Sozialistisches Archiv für Belletristik
- von Gélieu, Claudia: Frauen in Haft – Gefängnis Barnimstraße; eine Justizgeschichte. Elefanten-Press, Berlin 1994, ISBN 3-88520-530-0. (Nachdruck: Frauen in Haft. Gefängnis Barnimstraße. Eine Justizgeschichte. Espresso-Verlag, ISBN 3-88520-530-0)
