= Robert Mohr =

Gestapo interrogator (1897–1977)

Robert Mohr (5 April 1897 – 5 February 1977) was an interrogation specialist of the Gestapo. He headed the special commission responsible for the search and arrest of the White Rose, part of the German Resistance to Nazism.

== Early life ==
Robert Mohr was born in Bisterschied in the Palatinate in 1897 into the family of a Palatine-born master mason, one of six brothers and three sisters. Mohr completed an apprenticeship as a tailor, but never practiced this profession. He served in the German Army during the First World War and was awarded the Iron Cross Second Class before resigning in May 1919. In October 1919, Mohr entered the Bavarian police. In May 1933 he joined the Nazi Party. He also belonged to the National Socialist Motor Corps, the Reich Air Defense League, the Reich Colonial League, and the National Socialist People's Welfare organizations. In the 1930s he worked as a police chief in Frankenthal (Pfalz). From 1938 he worked for the Gestapo in Munich.

== The White Rose ==
Between 18 and 20 February 1943, Mohr interrogated Sophie Scholl and obtained her confession to the distribution of leaflets for the White Rose movement. In a 1951 report to Robert Scholl, Sophie's father, Mohr said he tried to save Sophie's life by leading her to testify against her brother Hans Scholl, to say she was under his influence and that they had different opinions on politics.

== Later life ==
After completion of the investigation into the White Rose, Mohr became chief of the Gestapo office in Mulhouse, occupied Alsace. Around 1947 he was interned by the French but was not tried for his service in the Gestapo. From 1948 he worked in the spa at Bad Dürkheim. He died in 1977 in Ludwigshafen.

== Media ==
=== Film ===
- Sophie Scholl – The Final Days, Director: Marc Rothemund.

Mohr was played by Alexander Held

=== Literature ===
- Inge Aicher-Scholl Die Weiße Rose. ISBN 3-596-11802-6 Mit Abdruck des Berichtes von Robert Mohr an Robert Scholl
