= Hinterland (2021 film) =

2021 Austrian anti-war thriller film

- Promotional poster
- Directed by: Stefan Ruzowitzky
- Written by: Robert Buchschwenter; Hanno Pinter; Stefan Ruzowitzky
- Produced by: Oliver Neumann; Sabine Moser; Bady Minck; Alexander Dumreicher-Ivanceanu; Geneviève Lemal; Robert Marciniak
- Starring: Murathan Muslu; Liv Lisa Fries; Marc Limpach
- Cinematography: Benedict Neuenfels
- Edited by: Oliver Neumann
- Music by: Kyan Bayani
- Production companies: FreibeuterFilm GmbH; AMOUR FOU; Scope Pictures; Lieblingsfilm
- Distributed by: Square One Entertainment; Constantin Movie
- Release dates: 6 August 2021 (Locarno); 7 October 2021 (Germany)
- Running time: 99 minutes
- Countries: Austria; Luxembourg
- Language: German

Hinterland is a 2021 Austrian-Luxembourgish crime thriller film directed by Stefan Ruzowitzky and starring Murathan Muslu and Liv Lisa Fries.

== Synopsis ==
The film is set in Vienna in 1920, after the fall of the Austro-Hungarian Empire. Former detective Peter Perg returns home after the end of World War I, having spent years as a prisoner of war. After a series of killings of other POWs, he joins forces with forensic doctor Theresa Körner to solve the crimes.

== Cast ==
- Murathan Muslu as Peter Perg
- Liv Lisa Fries as Dr. Theresa Körner
- Max von der Groeben as Kommissar Paul Severin
- Marc Limpach as Polizeirat Victor Renner
- Aaron Friesz as Kovacs
- Stipe Erceg as Bauer
- Margarethe Tiesel as Hausmeisterin Subotic
- Matthias Schweighöfer as Josef Severin
- Miriam Fontaine as Anna Perg
- Lukas Johne as Vorarbeiter
- Wolfgang Pissecker as Gefängniswärter
- Konstantin Rommelfangen as Sesta
- Fabian Schiffkorn as Polizist
- Eugen Victor as Portier
- Timo Wagner as Oberleutnant Krainer
- Lukas Walcher as Heresmaty
- Trystan Pütter as Rudolf Gerster
- Germain Wagner as Graf von Starkenberg

== Production ==
The film was shot to a large extent with the blue screen technology, the scenes were mainly created on the computer. In July 2021, a trailer of the film was released.

== Release ==
The film premiered at the 74th Locarno Film Festival on 6 August 2021 and won Prix du public UBS Award.

Its German premiere was on 7 October 2021.

== Awards and nominations ==
Year	Award	Category	Work	Result	Ref.
2021	74th Locarno Film Festival	Prix du public UBS Award	Hinterland	Won	
