= Alexander Held =

German actor (1958–2026)

- Held, c. 2010
- Born: Gerald Alexander Held; 19 October 1958; Munich, Bavaria, West Germany
- Died: 12 May 2026 (aged 67); Erl, Tyrol, Austria
- Education: Otto Falckenberg School of the Performing Arts
- Occupation: Actor
- Years active: 1980–2026
- Spouse: Patricia Gräfin Fugger von Babenhausen (m. 2005; died 2014)
- Parents: José Held (father); Sophie Held (mother)
- Awards: Bavarian TV Awards

Gerald Alexander Held (19 October 1958 – 12 May 2026) was a German actor. He was internationally best-known for his depictions of people involved in recent history, as Walther Hewel in the 2004 film Der Untergang, Robert Mohr in the 2005 film Sophie Scholl – Die letzten Tage and as state prosecutor Siegfried Buback in the 2008 film Der Baader Meinhof Komplex. He played the head commissioner in each of two German television crime series, Stralsund and München Mord, portraying two distinctly different characters.

== Life and career ==
Held was born in Munich on 19 October 1958. His father José Held, who died in 1974, was also an actor. During his school years, Held was a solo singer of the Regensburger Domspatzen from 1968 to 1970. He played football for 1860 Munich, winning five youth championships. An injury prevented a professional football career. Held finished an acting training at the Otto Falckenberg School of the Performing Arts in Munich, and then joined the Munich Kammerspiele in 1980. Further engagements followed at the Staatsschauspiel Hannover, then directed by Hans Neuenfels, the Volksbühne in Berlin until 1994, the Theater Basel, and the Salzburg Festival.

Held first appeared on television in 1974, in an episode of the Derrick crime series. In 1993, Held was cast by director Klaus Emmerich in Morlock in his first television film role. He then appeared in numerous cinema and TV productions, including Steven Spielberg's Schindler's List, Marc Rothemund's Sophie Scholl – The Last Days, and Oliver Hirschbiegel's Der Untergang) (Downfall). His declamation of German was unusually precise and sharp.

In 2007, he starred alongside Iris Berben as the greedy villain Heinrich von Strahlberg in the two-part TV film Afrika, mon amour. In 2008, he played Alois Kugler, the opponent of Brandner Kaspar, in Die Geschichte vom Brandner Kaspar, directed by Joseph Vilsmaier. In 2009, he played the politically tactical abbot Kuno in Margarethe von Trotta's film Vision alongside Barbara Sukowa, Heino Ferch, and Hannah Herzsprung, and the same year was seen in Sönke Wortmann's Pope Joan as the Frankish Emperor Lothar I. In 2010, he played the Attorney General Dr. Sasse alongside Ulrich Tukur in Dieter Wedel's two-part TV film Gier.

From 2010, he starred as the head police commissioner Karl Hidde in the crime series Stralsund. Beginning in 2014, he played the lead role of head commissioner Ludwig Schaller in the crime series München Mord. It earned him awards such as the Bavarian TV Award, and the jury wrote that in his role as a commissioner who takes unusual approaches and is regarded as crazy, Held portrayed him as "a level-headed, intelligent man who, at first, appears to resign himself to his fate. His composed demeanour gave rise to wonderfully comic moments, for which this magnificent actor barely needed to change his expression." He gave the two head commissioners distinctly different characters.

=== Personal life ===
From December 2005, Held was married to the actress Patricia Gräfin Fugger von Babenhausen, who died in 2014. His last residence was in Erl, Tyrol.

Held died in Erl after a short illness on 12 May 2026, at the age of 67.

== Selected filmography ==
Held played in more than 160 films and television series, including:

- 1974: Derrick (TV series) – Georg
- 1993: Schindler's List – SS bureaucrat
- 1993: Morlock (TV series) – Dr. Hagenberg
- 1996: Der kalte Finger (Deathline) – commissioner
- 1997: Die Musterknaben – Wempe
- 1998: Der Fahnder (TV Series) – Mackenrath
- 2000: Anatomy – police officer
- 2001: Der Schuh des Manitu (The Shoe of Manitou) – Karl May (cameo)
- 2001: 100 Pro – Drunk man
- 2001: Leo & Claire – Gauleiter
- 2002: Bibi Blocksberg – Dr. Buttkock
- 2003: Effroyables Jardins (Strange Gardens) – SS officer
- 2003–2009: Der Bulle von Tölz (TV series) – Hans Meidenbauer
- 2004: Before the Fall – Friedrich's father
- 2004: Der Untergang) (Downfall) – Walther Hewel
- 2005: Sophie Scholl – Die letzten Tage (Sophie Scholl – The Final Days) – Robert Mohr
- 2005: Der Schatz der weißen Falken – Carsten
- 2006: Wholetrain – Officer Steinbauer
- 2006: Das wahre Leben (Life-Actually) – Happy Krüger
- 2007: Afrika, mon amour (TV mini series) – Heinrich von Strahlberg
- 2008: Die Welle (The Wave) – Tim's Father
- 2008: The Baader Meinhof Complex – Siegfried Buback
- 2008: Die Geschichte vom Brandner Kaspar – Kugler Alois
- from 2008: Stralsund (TV series) – head commissioner Karl Hidde
- 2009: Vision – Kuno
- 2009: Die Päpstin (Pope Joan) – Lothar I
- 2010: Gier (Greed, TV series) – Dr. Saase
- 2010: Augustine: The Decline of the Roman Empire (TV film) – Older Valerius
- 2010: Nanga Parbat – Dr. Franz Burda (cameo)
- 2011: 4 Days in May – Colonel Wald
- 2013: Heute bin ich blond (The Girl with Nine Wigs) – Dr. Friedrich Leonhard
- from 2014: München Mord (TV series, 17 episodes) – Ludwig Schaller
- 2014: Die Seelen im Feuer (Burning Souls, TV film) – Bishop Friedrich Förner
- 2015: Sanctuary – Hausvater Brockmann
- 2015: Tannbach (TV series) – Franz Schober
- 2017: Mein Blind Date mit dem Leben (My Blind Date with Life) – Fried

== Awards ==
- 2014: Bavarian TV Awards as best actor in the category Series and Film Series for Ludwig Schaller in München Mord (ZDF)
- 2023: Honorary prize of Deutscher Fernsehkrimipreis for Ludwig Schaller in München Mord (ZDF)
