= Christoph Schlingensief =

German film and stage director (1960–2010)

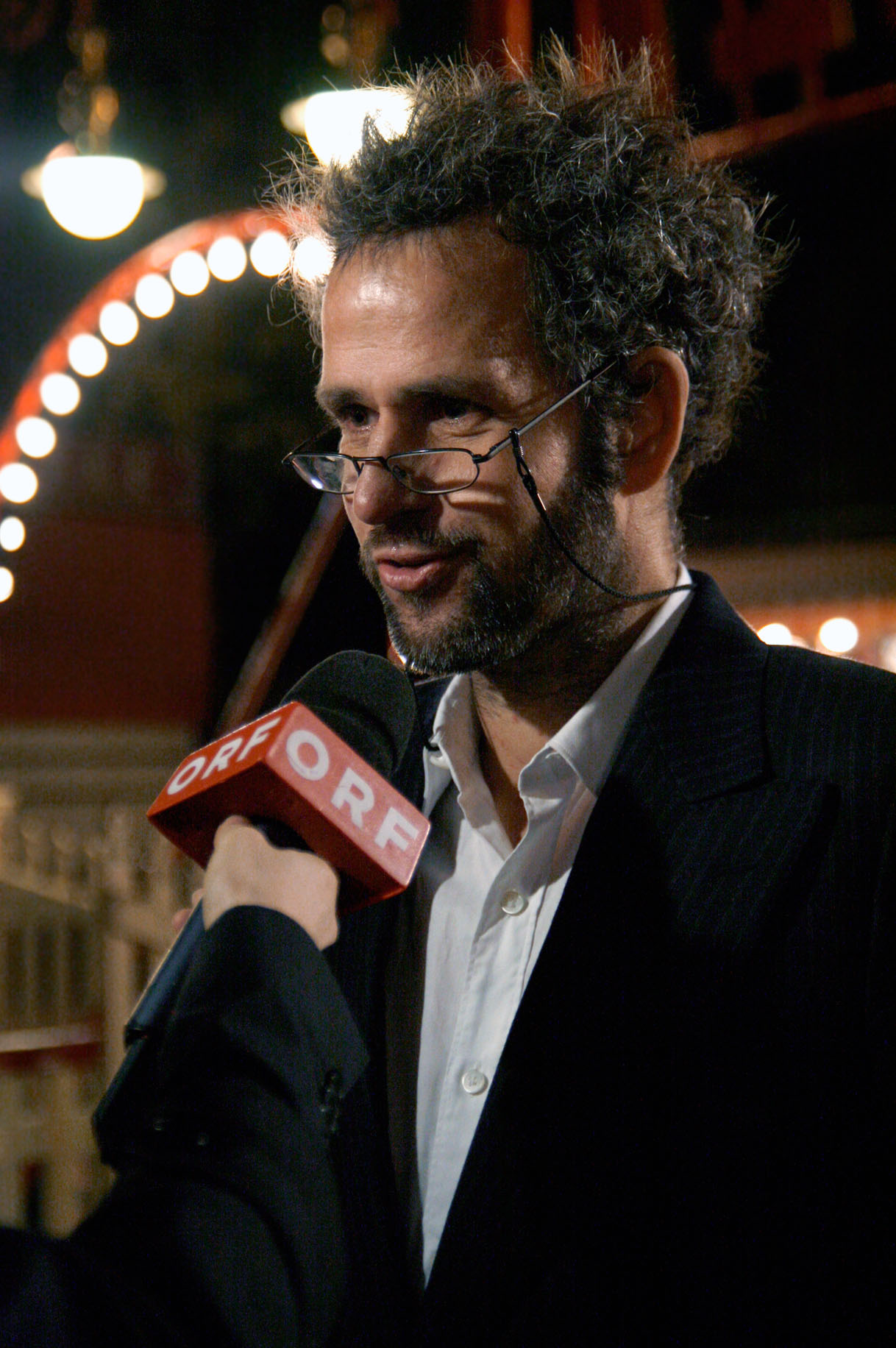
- Schlingensief in October 2009
- Born: Christoph Maria Schlingensief; 24 October 1960; Oberhausen, West Germany
- Died: 21 August 2010 (aged 49); Berlin, Germany
- Occupation: Director

Christoph Maria Schlingensief (24 October 1960 – 21 August 2010) was a German theatre director, performance artist, and filmmaker. Starting as an independent underground filmmaker, Schlingensief later staged productions for theatres and festivals, often accompanied by public controversies. In the final years before his death, he staged Wagner's Parsifal at the Bayreuth Festival and worked at several opera houses, establishing himself as a Regietheater artist.

== Early life and education ==
Schlingensief was born on 24 October 1960 in Oberhausen. His father was a pharmacist and his mother a pediatric nurse. As a child, he worked as an altar server and already made short films with a hand-held camera.

Having passed his Abitur exams, he twice failed to gain admission to the University of Television and Film Munich. From 1981 he studied German language and literature, philosophy and art history at Ludwig-Maximilians-Universität München, but also dabbled as a musician and finally dropped out in 1983 to work as an assistant to the experimental filmmaker Werner Nekes. After working as a teacher at Hochschule für Gestaltung Offenbach am Main and Kunstakademie Düsseldorf, he became a production manager on Hans W. Geißendörfer's TV series Lindenstraße.

== Career ==
Already as a young man Schlingensief had organized art events in the cellar of his parents' house, and local artists such as Helge Schneider or Theo Jörgensmann performed in his early short films. He considered himself a 'provocatively thoughtful' artist. He created numerous controversial and provocative theatre pieces as well as films, his former mentor being filmmaker and media artist Werner Nekes.

=== Film ===
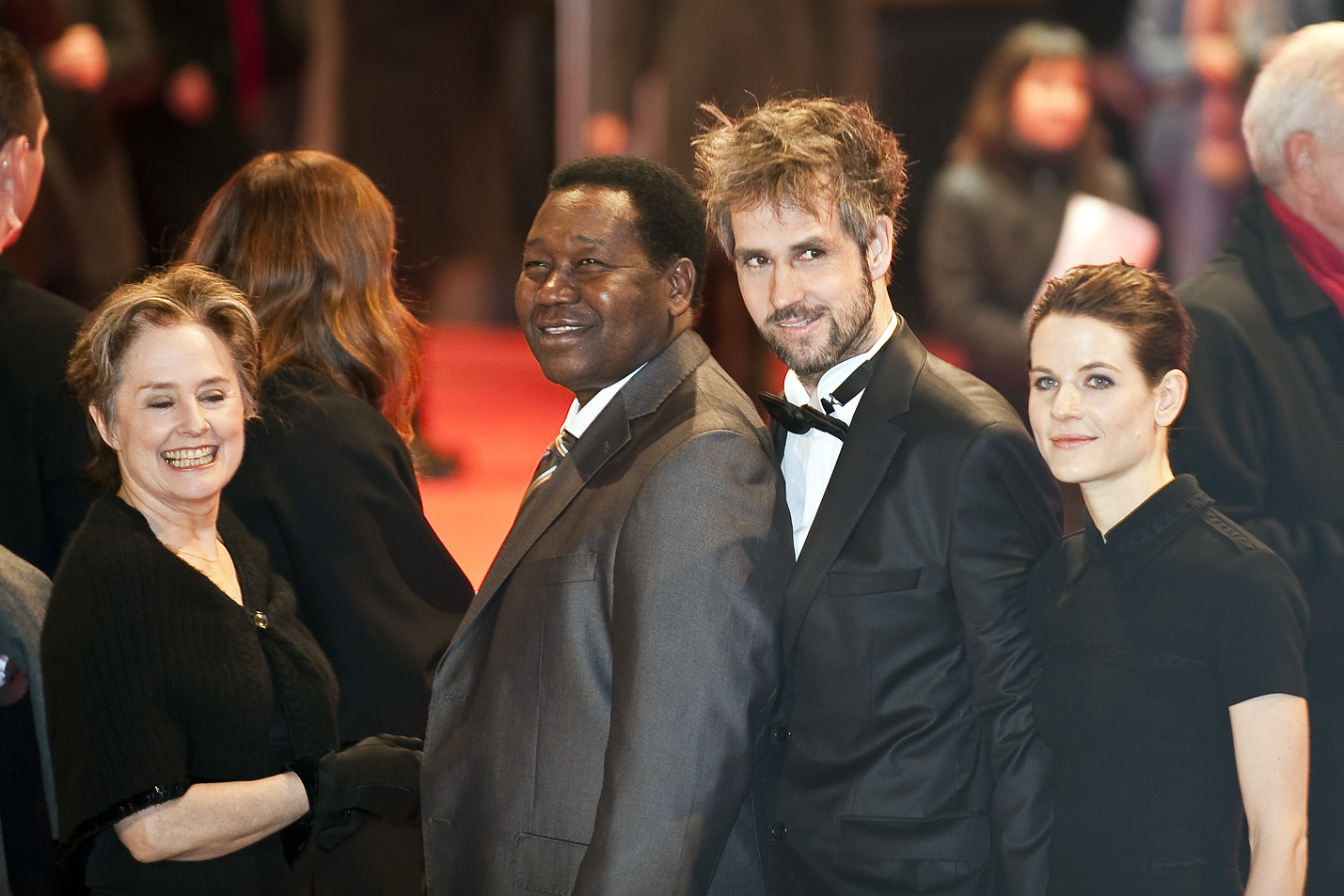
Schlingensief at the 2009 Berlinale reception, with his partner Aino Laberenz (right), Alice Waters and Gaston Kaboré

Already Schlingensief's debut feature film, the surreal, absurd experimental Tunguska – Die Kisten sind da! ("Tunguska – The Crates Are Delivered!", 1984) was well received by critics. Growing up in the shadow of the New German Cinema, Schlingensief was deeply influenced by the likes of Rainer Werner Fassbinder—many members of whose stock company of actors such as Udo Kier, Margit Carstensen, Irm Hermann or Volker Spengler became regulars in Schlingensief's films—or Alexander Kluge, with whom he collaborated on numerous occasions. To said period of film, Schlingensief delivered both a heartfelt homage as well as the final coup de grâce with The 120 Days of Bottrop—starring Helmut Berger, playing an inept director's effort to remake Pier Paolo Pasolini's Salò, or the 120 Days of Sodom (1975)—in much the same way he dealt with German avant-garde cinema 15 years earlier with his first feature film Tunguska – The Crates Are Delivered starring Alfred Edel. Drawing parallels to the work of British filmmaker Derek Jarman, Egomania – Island without Hope (1986) starred Kier and Tilda Swinton. Other influences include Luis Buñuel, Werner Schroeter or Herbert Achternbusch—and Schlingensief's filmic works have been compared to just as wide a range of filmmakers, from Jean-Luc Godard to Russ Meyer.

With his "Germany Trilogy", consisting of 100 Years of Adolf Hitler – The Last Hour in the Führerbunker, The German Chainsaw Massacre – The First Hour of the Reunification and Terror 2000 – Germany out of Control, Schlingensief came to prominence. Since then he shaped the cultural and political discourse in Germany for more than two decades and established himself as one of the country's most important and versatile artists. The "Germany Trilogy" deals with three turning points in 20th-century German history: the first movie Hundert Jahre Adolf Hitler ("A Hundred Years of Adolf Hitler", 1989) covers the last hours of Adolf Hitler, the second The German Chainsaw Massacre (1990), depicts the German reunification of 1990 and shows a group of East Germans who cross the border to visit West Germany and get slaughtered by a psychopathic West German family with chainsaws, and the third Terror 2000 (1992) focuses on xenophobic violence after the reunification process.

One of Schlingensief's central tactics was to call politicians' bluff in an attempt to reveal the inanities of their "responsible" discourse, a tactic he called "playing something through to its end". This strategy was most notable in his work Please Love Austria (alternately named Foreigners out! Schlingensiefs Container) at the time of the FPÖ and ÖVP coalition in Austria, a work which attracted international support, a media frenzy and countless debates about art practice.

In 2009, he joined the jury of the Berlin International Film Festival with Tilda Swinton as jury president.

=== Television ===
Schlingensief soon became a figure of considerable celebrity and notoriety in Germany, thanks to several popular television projects. Broadcast in 1997, Talk 2000 was a talk show with celebrity guests in which Schlingensief sometimes interrupted interviews to discuss his own personal problems. In U3000 (2000), he and his crew were filmed acting crazily on platforms and in cars of the Berlin subway system; the program aired on MTV Germany. In Freakstars 3000 (2003), a six-part American Idol-style parody, two dozen people from an assisted-living home for the mentally disabled competed for spots in a new band.

=== Art ===
In 1997, Schlingesief staged an art action at the documenta X exhibition in Kassel as part of the performance space "Hybrid WorkSpace", which was curated by Klaus Biesenbach, Nancy Spector and Hans-Ulrich Obrist. During the performance, Schlingensief was arrested for carrying a placard with the words "Kill Helmut Kohl!". In November 1999, invited by P.S.1 Contemporary Art Center and organized by Klaus Biesenbach, Schlingensief carried out a performance at the Statue of Liberty in New York City, where, kneeling down at the foot of the statue, he handed Germany over to globalization.

His exhibition The Last Hour, with its twisted metalwork from a crashed car, footage of a long tunnel and paparazzi pictures of Princess Diana, was in 2006 rejected by the Frieze Art Fair in London's Regent's Park and instead ended up in a little-known gallery space in Bethnal Green. He later joined the Hauser & Wirth gallery. In 2007, the Haus der Kunst, Munich, mounted an exhibition of Schlingensief's work; it presented African Twin Towers and short films that have been shot while the artist directed The Flying Dutchman at the Teatro Amazonas in Manaus, Brazil.

=== Theatre ===
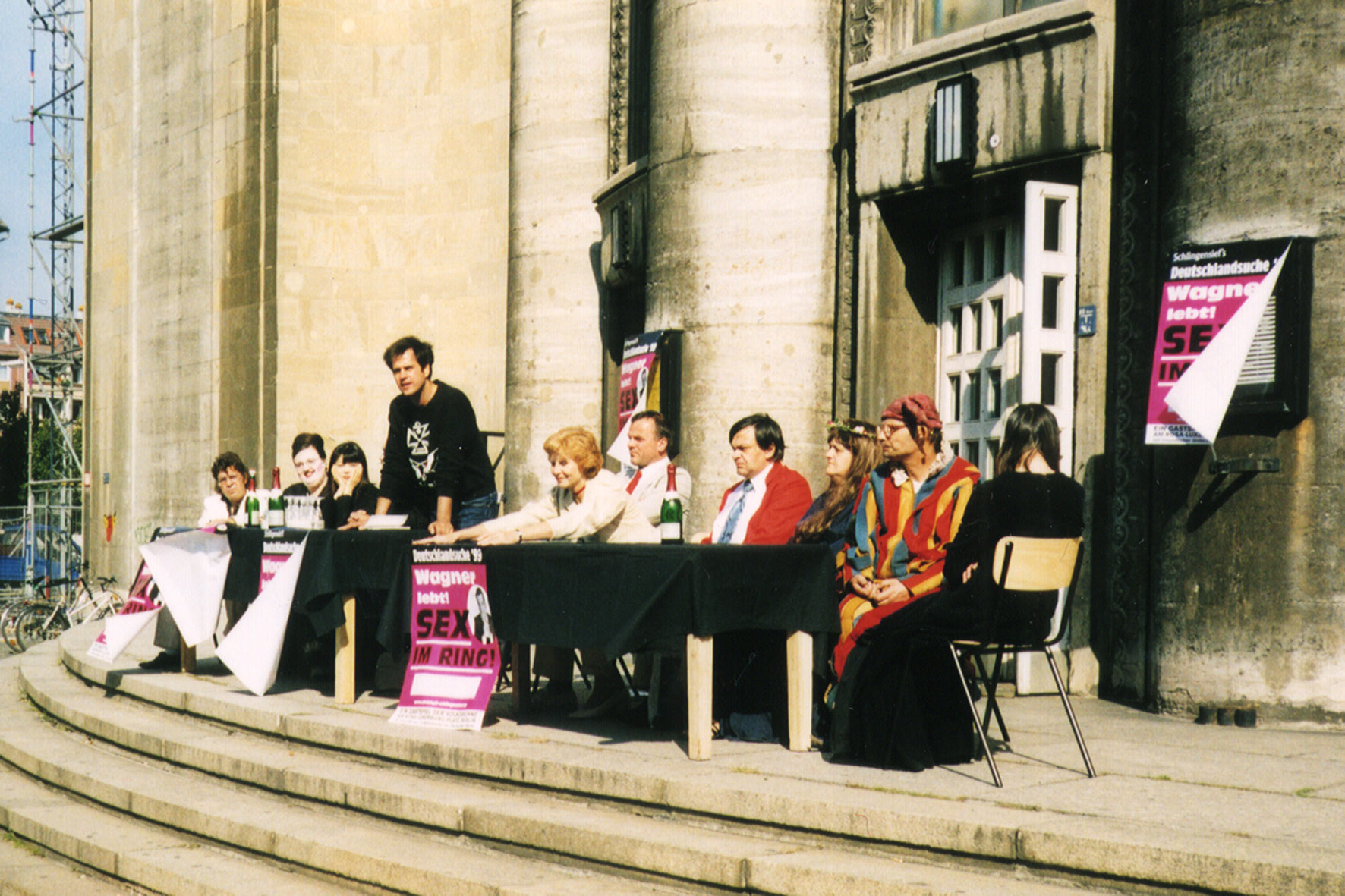
Schlingensief speaking at the Deutschlandsuche 99 performance in front of the Volksbühne, 1999

In the 1990s, Schlingensief directed a series of chaotic, satirical productions at the Volksbühne theatre in Berlin. He also directed a version of Hamlet, subtitled, This is your Family, Nazi~Line, which premiered in Switzerland, the so-called neutral territory equated with the Denmark of the opening line in Shakespeare's play where there is something foul afoot. Events around the piece questioned and attacked Switzerland's 'neutrality' in the face of growing racism and extreme right wing movements. The artist duo Ubermorgen provided the Internet platform Nazi~Line for the project, where former members of Neo Nazi groups were sought and then cast as actors to play characters in the drama on stage as a way of re-integrating the ex-Neo-Nazis with the common workforce of the theatre.

Schlingensief's work covered a variety of media, including installation and the ubiquitous 'talk show' and has in many cases led to audience members leaving the theatre space with Schlingensief and his colleagues to take part in events such as Passion Impossible, Wake Up Call for Germany 1997 or Chance 2000, Vote for Yourself in which he formed the Last Chance Party where anyone could become a candidate themselves in the run up to the federal election of 1998 in Germany.

The same year he made a performance project for an Austrian festival for new art Steirischer Herbst called Chance 2000 for Graz: eight pillars were built at the central Marienplatz square, where homeless people were invited to sit on, and the deal was that the one who sat there longest could win 7,000 shillings, plus every day the artist threw 20,000 shillings on passers-by in front of the eyes of those who sat on the pillars. The project was interrupted with help of the right-wing Freedom Party of Austria, that collected 10,000 signatures against it.

With his demands for people to "prove they exist" in an age of total TV coverage and "act, act, act" in the sense of becoming active not 'actors', his work could be considered a direct legacy of Bertolt Brecht, as it demands involvement as opposed to passivity and merely looking on as is the case in traditional text-based theatre. In an age of extreme media fatigue, his was a fresh voice albeit and undisputedly containing echoes of the past, often humorous and subversive yet never cynical. His influences included Joseph Beuys and his idea of social sculpture, and artists Allan Kaprow and Dieter Roth. At the time of his death, he was involved in productions for the Ruhrtriennale and for the Berlin Staatsoper's "Metanoia".

=== Opera ===
In 2004, at the invitation of Wolfgang and Katharina Wagner, he staged Wagner's Parsifal for the Bayreuth Festival. When he accepted the Wagner family's invitation, it caused surprise because of his iconoclasm and his well-known aversion to all things tainted by association with Hitler; however, he had been invited to the festival before in 1991. Film clips and costumes focused the action on the conflict between Christianity and Islam. The production, in the first years conducted by Pierre Boulez, was revived in 2005 and 2006, but unlike other Bayreuth Festival stagings it was not filmed.

In his last productions, such as the fluxus oratorio Church of Fear and the ready made opera Mea culpa, he staged his own cancer experience, and related it to his first 'stage experience' as a young altar boy.

=== Opera Village Africa ===
Schlingensief's commitment to developing nations later took him to Burkina Faso, where he was awarded a concession to build an opera house, arguably his most ambitious project. The project, which received funding from the German government, was also to include a theater and film school, and an infirmary. Construction began in January 2010, near Ouagadougou, and was later continued under the guidance of Schlingensief's wife and long-time assistant Aino Laberenz, whom he married in 2009. In 2012, numerous internationally renowned artists have donated works for a fundraising auction at the Hamburger Bahnhof, among them Marina Abramović, Pipilotti Rist, Georg Baselitz, Christo, Olafur Eliasson, Andreas Gursky, Wolfgang Tillmans and Günther Uecker. Patti Smith, a friend of Schlingensief for many years, contributed a drawing that she made in the summer of 2010 during a joint exhibition in Munich.

== Death ==
After learning he had lung cancer in early 2008, Schlingensief wrote about his illness and in 2009 published Heaven Could Not Be as Beautiful as Here: A Cancer Diary. Also, he already organised part of his estate and entrusted it for archiving to the Berlin Academy of the Arts. He died on 21 August 2010 in Berlin, Germany, at age 49. In a note to his death in the Süddeutsche Zeitung, Literature Nobel Prize Laureate Elfriede Jelinek wrote:

Schlingensief was one of the greatest artists who ever lived. I always thought one like him cannot die. It is as if life itself had died. He was not really a stage director (in spite of Bayreuth and Parsifal), he was everything: he was the artist as such. He has coined a new genre that has been removed from each classification. There will be nobody like him.

== Venice Biennale ==
In 2011, the jury of the 54th Venice Biennale awarded the international exhibition's highest honor, the "Golden Lion for best national pavilion", to Germany for its display of work by Christoph Schlingensief. Organized by curator Susanne Gaensheimer, who completed the exhibition after Schlingensief's death, the German pavilion was transformed into a replica of the church where the artist spent his teenage years as an altar boy in order to present Fluxus Oratorio, the second of his three-part final work, created after he had undergone surgery to remove a lung. The exhibition presented multimedia documents—from videos to x-rays—relating to his battle with terminal cancer. A side room showed footage and a maquette made as part of Schlingensief's project to build an opera house in Burkina Faso, while another wing displayed a selection of films from throughout his career. In an interview with Berliner Zeitung, artist Gerhard Richter had previously criticised Schlingensief's appointment as "a scandal", associating the selection of the multitasking director with "the decline of painting".

== Projects ==
=== 1990s ===
- 1990–1993 he directed a series of films known as the Germany trilogy
- 1993 he directed his first stage piece "100 Years of CDU" at the Volksbühne Berlin
- 1994 Kuhnen "94, Bring Me the Head of Adolf Hitler!" at the Volksbühne Berlin
- 1996 Director of the movie United Trash
- 1996 Rocky Dutschke at the Volksbühne Berlin
- 1997 My Felt, My Fat, My Hare, 48 Hours Survival for Germany (documenta X, Kassel)
- 1997 Passion Impossible, Wake Up Call for Germany, Deutsches Schauspielhaus Hamburg and Station Mission for the Homeless
- 1998 Chance 2000, an Election Circus, Prater Garden, Berlin and other locations nationwide
- 1999 Freakstars 3000 at the Volksbühne Berlin

=== 2000s ===
- 2000 Foreigners out! Schlingensiefs Container (Opera Square, Vienna in association with the Burgtheater)
- 2001 Hamlet, This is Your Family—Nazi Line in Zürich, Switzerland, and at the Volksbühne in Berlin in collaboration with Ubermorgen
- 2002 Atta Atta—Art Has Broken Out! at Volksbühne in Berlin
- 2003 founded the "Church of Fear" at the Venice Biennale
- 2003 directed Bambiland by Elfriede Jelinek at the Burgtheater in Vienna
- 2004 directed Richard Wagners Parsifal at the Bayreuth Festspielhaus
- 2004 created Kunst und Gemuese at Volksbühne in Berlin
- 2005 premiered The Animatograph in Reykjavík, Iceland, which continues in various manifestations up to the present
- 2006 directed Area 7, a St Matthews Expedition at the Burgtheater in Vienna
- 2006 premiered Kaprow City a performative installation at the Volksbühne in Berlin
- 2007 directed The Flying Dutchman at the Amazon Theatre, Manaus
- 2007 created a new talk show series for Arte television, The Pilots
- 2008 Eine Kirche der Angst vor dem Fremden in mir (Landschaftspark Duisburg-Nord)
- 2009 Mea Culpa – eine ReadyMadeOper (Burgtheater, Vienna)
- 2009 Sterben lernen
- 2010 Remdoogo – Via Intolleranza II (Bavarian State Opera, Munich)
