= Rakete Perelman =

2017 German tragicomedy film

- Directed by: Oliver Alaluukas
- Written by: Johannes Rothe (screenplay); Oliver Alaluukas (story)
- Produced by: Anna Wendt
- Starring: Liv Lisa Fries
- Music by: Inma Galiot, Daniel Glatzel, Robert Pilgram
- Production companies: Anna Wendt Filmproduktion, RBB Fernsehen (Co-Production), Filmuniversität Babelsberg Konrad Wolf (Co-Production)
- Distributed by: daredo media GmbH, Darling Berlin
- Release date: 24 January 2017
- Running time: 97 minutes
- Country: Germany
- Language: German

Rakete Perelman (English: Rocket Perelman) is a 2017 German tragicomedy film from director Oliver Alaluukas. The film premiered at the 38th Max Ophüls Preis Film Festival on January 24, 2017, and was released in German cinemas on November 9, 2017. It stars Liv Lisa Fries in the leading role.

== Plot ==
Jen, who is in her mid-twenties, is fed up with the hectic city life and her job in the fashion industry. She goes to her old friend Till in the Brandenburg wasteland and joins the art colony Rakete Perelman.

There, ten people have joined to form a self-sufficient living community away from bourgeois society. Jen experiences a whole new model of life in the modern commune, which oscillates between individualism and community and between art and commerce. The commune also needs money in order to exist. That's why Tobias, the founder of the commune, wants to generate urgently needed income with a theater performance. He enlists Jen, along with Till and filmmaker Miro, to play the lead roles. As work on the play begins, open conflict arises within the commune, forcing them to take a stand on their idealism.

== Cast ==
- Liv Lisa Fries as Jen
- Tobias Lehmann as Tobias
- Gordon Kämmerer as Till
- Stefan Lampadius as Sebastian
- Kai Michael Müller as Miro
- Anne Haug as Carmen
- Africa Brau as África
- Oliver Bröcker as Marcus
- Lilly Marie Tschörtner as Julia
- Mathilde Fiedler as Alma
- Ilyes Moutaoukkil as Emilio
- Lars Rudolph as Mister Grube
- Franziska Jünger as Fitness employee
- Dario Lehner as Heiko Kessler, mailman
- Milton Welsh as Fitness employee

== Production and background ==
Rocket Perelman was made as part of the LEUCHTSTOFF initiative of Rundfunk Berlin-Brandenburg and Medienboards Berlin-Brandenburg, which also funded the film. The work is also Oliver Alaluukas' diploma project at the Konrad Wolf Film University of Babelsberg. The Anna Wendt Filmproduktion GmbH produced the movie and the Konrad Wolf Film University of Babelsberg and the Rundfunk Berlin-Brandenburg were co-producers.

== Reception ==
The German film reviews of Rakete Perelman so far have been predominantly praising and benevolent. So Harald Mühlbeyer of German film magazine kino-zeit.de praises that Oliver Alaluukas "traces the development of the rocket Perelman from the newcomer's point of view in beautiful, wide Cinemascope images." Moreover, the critic notes that this is "psychologically not as intense as Marie Kreutzer's The Fatherless" and "cinematically not as radical as Lars von Trier's Idiots." Alaluukas tells "conventionally but cleverly about the small tensions that can lead to big upheavals. Quite casually and without much fanfare, turning points, new perspectives, surprises arise from the characters. Characters that Alaluukas gives all their space to unfold, that he brings close to us - and yet who then act unexpectedly at the decisive moment."

Björn Schneider of German art house - cinema magazine Programmkino.de praises the film's ensemble of actors. The actors "lend their characters a high degree of natural charm with their sympathetic, down-to-earth, unaffected acting style." And would thereby offer "ample identification potential."

Falk Straub of the German film website Spielfilm.de also praises the film's acting and visual language: "For all the convincing acting, "Rakete Perelman" is also a beautifully photographed film. Cinematographer Valentin Selmke also makes his long-distance debut, wrestling many an impressive view from the Brandenburg landscape or the nighttime party in the fluorescent look." However, But Falk Straub criticizes the film's narrative for "revealing its construction too easily" and "ultimately remaining somewhat insubstantial."

== Accolades ==
- 2017: Nomination for the Max Ophüls Award in the category Best Feature Film for Oliver Alaluukas at the Max Ophüls Preis Film Festival in Saarbrücken, Germany
- 2017: Nomination for the award Best Young Actor for Gordon Kämmerer at the Max Ophüls Preis Film Festival
- 2017: Nomination for the award Flying Ox in the category Best Feature for Oliver Alaluukas at the FilmArtFestival Mecklenburg-Pomerania
- 2017: Nomination for the award Best feature film for Oliver Alaluukas at the Aubagne International Film Festival
- 2017: Nomination for the award Best feature for Oliver Alaluukas at the Achtung Berlin Film Festival
