= Romeos (film) =

2011 film by Sabine Bernardi

- Theatrical release poster
- Directed by: Sabine Bernardi
- Written by: Sabine Bernardi
- Produced by: Janna Velber; Kristina Löbbert
- Starring: Rick Okon; Maximilian Befort; Liv Lisa Fries; Felix Brocke; Silke Geertz; Gilles Tschudi; Sigrid Burkholder; Johannes Schwab; Tessa Lukat; Ben Gageik; Ralf Rotterdam
- Cinematography: Moritz Schultheiß
- Edited by: Renata Salazar-Ivancan
- Music by: Roland Appel
- Production companies: Boogiefilm; ZDF
- Distributed by: Pro-Fun Media
- Release dates: 11 February 2011 (Berlin); 8 December 2011 (Germany)
- Running time: 94 minutes
- Country: Germany
- Languages: German; English; Italian
- Box office: $26,324

Romeos is a 2011 German romantic comedy-drama film written and directed by Sabine Bernardi. It was released theatrically in Germany on 8 December 2011. Prior to its release, the film's screenplay won the Best Treatment Cologne Screenplay Prize in 2007.

== Premise ==
Lukas is a 20-year-old gay trans man in the midst of his transition. After joining the Cologne gay scene, Lukas meets an attractive bad boy, a cisgender gay man named Fabio, and an attraction develops between the two men. Lukas is faced with the choice of revealing his identity to Fabio and risking losing everything.

== Cast ==
- Rick Okon as Lukas
- Maximilian Befort as Fabio
- Liv Lisa Fries as Ine
- Felix Brocke as Sven
- Silke Geertz as Annette
- Gilles Tschudi as Herr Boeken
- Sigrid Burkholder as Lukas' mother
- Johannes Schwab as Lukas' father
- Tessa Lukat as Leila
- Julia Schäfle as Blondie
- Ben Gageik as Svens Freund
- Ralf Rotterdam as Cassy Carrington

== See also ==
- List of lesbian, gay, bisexual or transgender-related films
