= Foreigners out! Schlingensiefs Container =

Austrian art project and television show

Foreigners out! Schlingensiefs Container (German: Ausländer raus! Schlingensiefs Container) (Note: Alternately named "Wien-Aktion", "Please Love Austria—First European Coalition Week", or "Foreigners Out—Artists against Human Rights"), is a television show from 2000 that took place during Wiener Festwochen, created by Christoph Schlingensief and directed by Paul Poet. Realising public xenophobia and the new hate politics, he installed a container camp on a square in the middle of Vienna. Made in a style that imitated the show Big Brother, it was critically aimed both at certain forms of television entertainment and at a latent xenophobia thriving all over the world.

== Political implications ==
The show was produced in Austria, and broadcast from the container set installed in Vienna. Shortly before Schlingensief came up with this project, the Freedom Party of Austria, under the leadership of Jörg Haider had been elected into the National Council of Austria and formed part of the new government.

== Concept ==
The basis of the show was that a dozen or so real life asylum seekers lived inside containers. However, instead of being voted out of the show, the candidates were to be voted out of the country. Creating and utilizing such a situation of living in a strictly confined area, not knowing what would happen next, was to remind the audience of Nazi concentration camps, pointing at and making artistic use of existing parallels between the Nazi camps and television formats like Big Brother.

== Methodology ==
Installing TV programs and other projects as mockeries of well-known existing formats is part of Schlingensief's methodology. In another show broadcast in Germany, Freakstars 3000, he set up a talent cast show where all candidates were mentally handicapped. In the theatre project Quiz 3000 (the '3000' was a recurring trademark of Schlingensief), he mocked the show Who wants to be a millionaire?, using questions like "Please sort the following concentration camps from north to south".

== Film festivals and awards ==
Official festival selections for Paul Poet’s Foreigners Out! Schlingensief’s Container include:

- International Film Festival Rotterdam: Official Selection (2003)
- Mar del Plata Film Festival: Official Competition A (2003)
- Houston Worldfest: Gold Special Jury Award (2003)
- Images Festival, Toronto: Awarded Best International Film made on Video (2004)
- Docaviv, Tel Aviv, (2013)
- CPH:DOX, Copehagen: Official Selection (2018)
