= The Bitter Tears of Petra von Kant =

1972 film by Rainer Werner Fassbinder

- Theatrical release poster
- German: Die bitteren Tränen der Petra von Kant
- Directed by: Rainer Werner Fassbinder
- Screenplay by: Rainer Werner Fassbinder
- Based on: Die bitteren Tränen der Petra von Kant by Rainer Werner Fassbinder
- Produced by: Michael Fengler
- Starring: Margit Carstensen; Hanna Schygulla; Irm Hermann; Katrin Schaake; Eva Mattes; Gisela Fackeldey
- Cinematography: Michael Ballhaus
- Edited by: Thea Eymèsz
- Music by: The Platters; The Walker Brothers; Giuseppe Verdi
- Production companies: Filmverlag der Autoren; Tango Film
- Distributed by: Filmverlag der Autoren
- Release dates: 25 June 1972 (Berlin); 5 October 1972 (West Germany)
- Running time: 124 minutes
- Country: West Germany
- Language: German
- Budget: DEM 325,000

The Bitter Tears of Petra von Kant (German: Die bitteren Tränen der Petra von Kant) is a 1972 West German psychological romantic drama film written and directed by Rainer Werner Fassbinder, based on his play of the same name. Featuring an all-female cast, the film takes place entirely in the home of fashion designer Petra von Kant (Margit Carstensen), following the changing dynamics in her relationships with other women. The film was entered into the 22nd Berlin International Film Festival. It is regarded by many as Fassbinder's magnum opus and a classic of New German Cinema.

== Plot ==
Petra von Kant is a prominent fashion designer who lives in a luxurious apartment in Bremen. Her first husband, Pierre, her great love, died in a car accident while she was pregnant. She has recently divorced her second husband Frank due to his controlling nature. Petra lives with her taciturn personal assistant Marlene, whom she treats like a slave and constantly humiliates.

One day, while donning a brown wig, Petra is visited by her cousin Sidonie, and they talk about their marriages while Marlene works and acts as hostess. Sidonie's friend Karin Thimm soon joins them. Newly returned to Germany after residing in Sydney for five years, Karin is an attractive but shallow 23-year-old woman. Immediately attracted to Karin, Petra suggests she become a model. Karin agrees to return the following day.

The next day, Petra, wearing a larger, dark wig, offers to support Karin while she trains to be a model. Petra learns that Karin is married (her husband has remained in Sydney) but is only momentarily put off by this revelation. The women discuss their differences. Petra had a happy childhood and came from a home where the good things in life were always stressed, while Karin's father was a toolmaker and she always felt neglected by her parents. Petra has a daughter from her first marriage whom she rarely sees, but she reassures herself that her daughter is attending the best possible boarding school.

Karin's parents are dead. She says people reject her when they learn her history, but Petra says that her affection for Karin is even stronger after learning about her past. Karin reveals how her parents died: her father was laid off because of his age, killed his wife, and then hanged himself in a drunken stupor. Karin feels she has drifted in life; her husband treated her like a slave and offered no reprieve from her past. Petra declares this is about to change, promising to make Karin a great model. Since Karin is staying at a hotel, Petra suggests she move in with her. Petra admits to being in love with Karin, but Karin can only say she likes Petra.

Approximately six months later, Petra, in a red wig, cancels a flight reservation to Madrid for her and Karin over the telephone. Upon Petra's insistent questioning, Karin reveals that she slept with an African-American soldier the previous night. Freddy, Karin's husband, telephones from Zurich; it transpires that they have been in contact by letter, and that Karin is rejoining him. Petra calls her a "rotten little whore", and Karin responds that being with her is less strenuous than working the streets. She asks Petra to book a flight to Frankfurt, where she is to meet her husband, and asks for 500 marks; Petra gives her 1,000. A drunken Petra has Marlene drive Karin to the airport.

On her 35th birthday, Petra, wearing a blond wig, drinks heavily and anxiously waits for Karin to call. Her daughter, Gaby, arrives, followed by Sidonie, who gives Petra a doll with Karin's hairstyle as a birthday present. Sidonie mentions that Karin is in Bremen. When Petra's mother, Valerie, arrives, Petra accuses her of being a prostitute who never worked, living off first her husband and then Petra. Petra tramples on a china tea set and smashes glasses against the wall. Previously unaware of Karin, Valerie is shocked that Petra is in love with a woman. Petra proclaims she hates Gaby and never wants to see Sidonie again, but Gaby stays.

Later that night, Petra lies in bed without a wig. Valerie tells her that Gaby cried herself to sleep. Petra apologizes to her mother, and admits she did not love Karin but merely wanted to possess her. Karin calls, and Petra amicably declines to see her before she leaves for Paris, suggesting that perhaps they will meet again sometime. After her mother leaves, Petra apologizes to Marlene for mistreating her for years and proposes that they work together in the future. Marlene silently packs her belongings, including a pistol, in a small suitcase and leaves, taking the doll as she walks away.

== Cast ==
- Margit Carstensen as Petra von Kant
- Hanna Schygulla as Karin Thimm
- Katrin Schaake as Sidonie von Grasenabb
- Eva Mattes as Gabriele (Gaby) von Kant
- Gisela Fackeldey as Valerie von Kant
- Irm Hermann as Marlene

== Themes ==
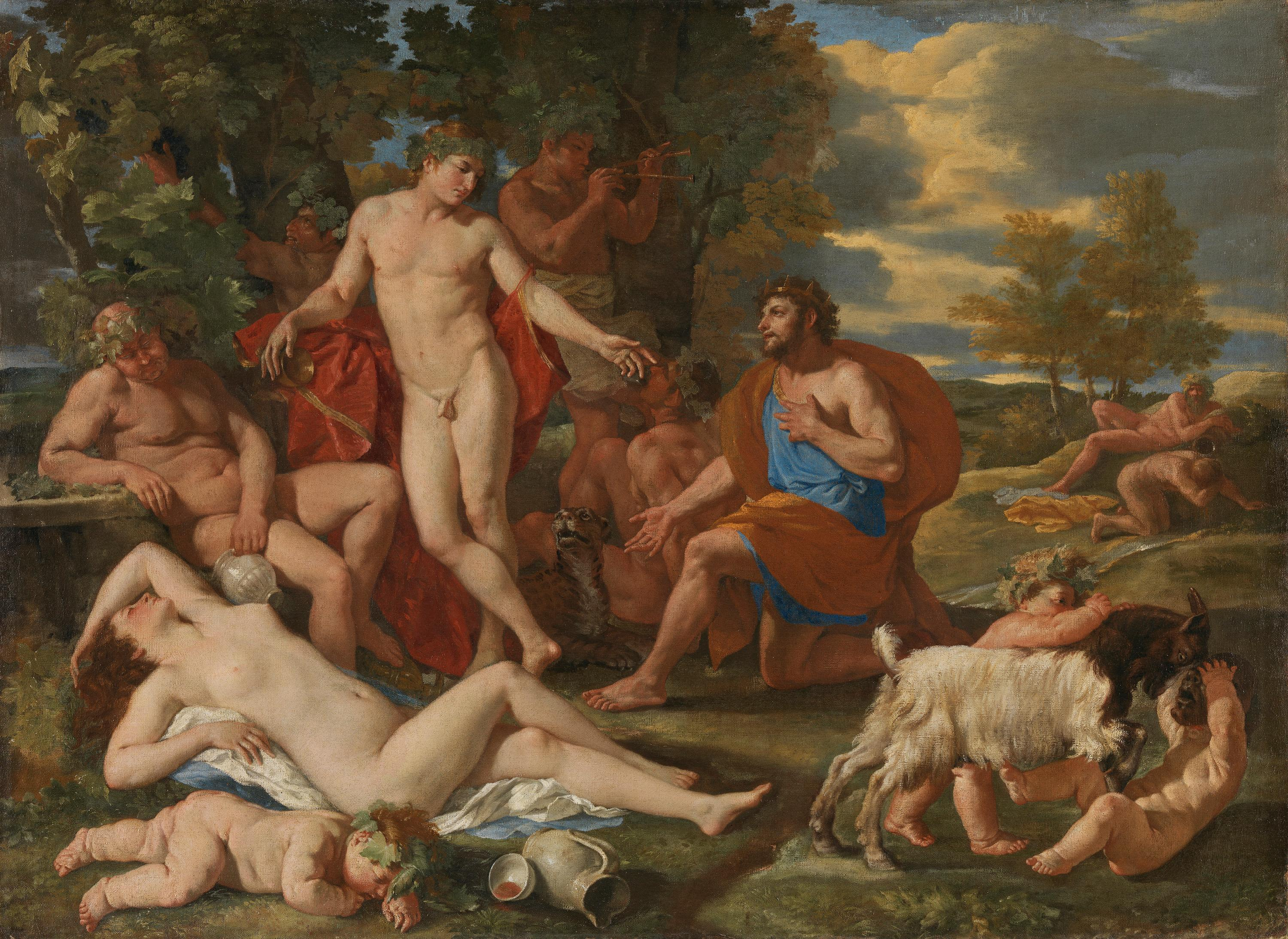
A large reproduction of Nicolas Poussin's painting Midas and Bacchus is prominently displayed in Petra's apartment.

Solitude, love, and codependency are key themes explored in The Bitter Tears of Petra von Kant. The solitary setting of Petra's bedroom maximizes the dramatic tension while mirroring her entrapment. The items in Petra's room and the positioning of the camera relative to the reproduction of Nicolas Poussin's Midas and Bacchus are manipulated to reflect and comment on the action.

== Reception ==
On the review aggregator website Rotten Tomatoes, the film holds an approval rating of 85% based on 34 reviews, with an average rating of 8/10. The website's critics consensus reads, "A thoughtful drama that grows even more powerful in retrospect, The Bitter Tears of Petra von Kant sensitively depicts a woman's tortured search for connection."

== Legacy ==
The Bitter Tears of Petra von Kant is considered a landmark of European cinema that secured Fassbinder's status as a respected auteur.

The 2014 film Clouds of Sils Maria revolves around a remount of a fictional play, Maloja Snake, about an intergenerational lesbian relationship. The film's director, Olivier Assayas, acknowledged a link between The Bitter Tears of Petra von Kant and Maloja Snake.

Peter Strickland has cited The Bitter Tears of Petra von Kant as a major influence on his 2015 film The Duke of Burgundy.

In 2022, director François Ozon released Peter von Kant, a reinterpretation of the film centred on a male director.

In 2025, The Bitter Tears Of Zahra Zand was released. It is a Persian-language adaption of the 1972 film and is directed by Vahid Hakimzadeh starring Boshra Dastournezhad as Zahra Zand.

== Operatic adaptation ==
The text of the play, in its English translation by Denis Calandra, was employed by Gerald Barry as the libretto for his five-act opera, commissioned by RTÉ and English National Opera and premiered in Dublin and London in 2005. The opera is also available on CD featuring the RTÉ National Symphony Orchestra.

== See also ==
- Sadism and masochism in fiction
