= Lars Rudolph =

German actor

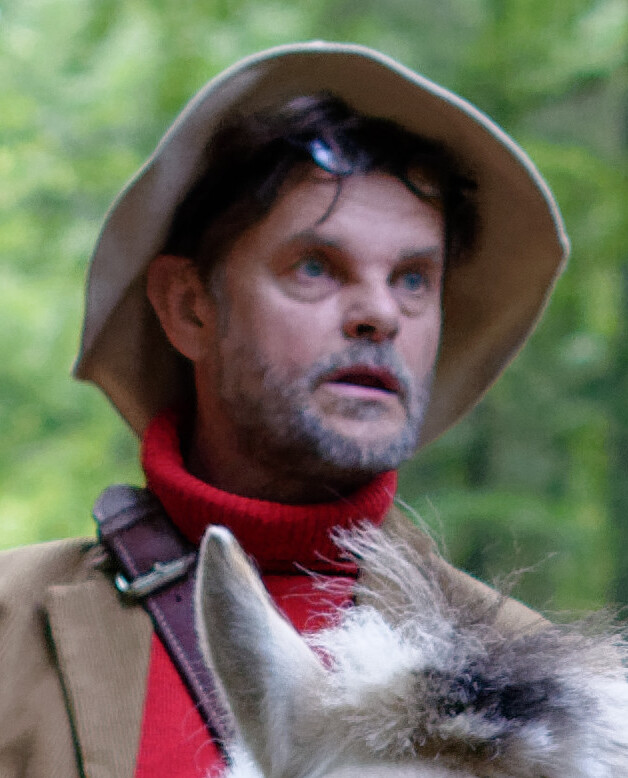
- Rudolph at the theatre performance "Wilde Welt Wald" in May 2018
- Born: 18 August 1966 (age 59); Wittmund, West Germany
- Occupations: Actor, musician
- Years active: 1984–present

Lars Rudolph (born 18 August 1966) is a German actor. He appeared in more than ninety films since 1984. He won the Max-Ophüls-Preis in 1997.

== Partial filmography ==
Year	Title	Role	Notes
1998	The Inheritors		
1998	Run Lola Run		
2000	No Place to Go	Viktor	
2000	The Princess and the Warrior		
2000	Werckmeister Harmonies	János Valuska	
2002	Baby		
2003	Luther		
2004	Der Wixxer		
2007	Neues vom Wixxer		
2007	The Edge of Heaven		
2008	Mordshunger		
2008	De Brief voor de Koning		
2009	Soul Kitchen		
2011	Lilly the Witch: The Journey to Mandolan		
2013	The Police Officer's Wife		
2013	Gold		
2014	Therapy for a Vampire	Oscar	
2015	Look Who's Back	Kiosk owner	
2017	Rocket Perelman	Mister Grube	
2019	White on White		
2023	An Endless Sunday	Domenico	
