= Die Weiße Rose (film) =

1982 German film

- DVD cover
- Directed by: Michael Verhoeven
- Written by: Mario Krebs; Michael Verhoeven
- Produced by: Artur Brauner, Hans Prescher, Dietmar Schings, Michael Verhoeven
- Starring: Lena Stolze; Wulf Kessler; Ulrich Tukur; Werner Stocker; Martin Benrath
- Distributed by: TeleCulture (USA)
- Release date: 24 September 1982
- Running time: 123 minutes
- Country: West Germany
- Language: German

Die Weiße Rose (The White Rose) is a 1982 CCC Film production about the White Rose resistance to the Nazis led by university students in Munich in 1942–1943 whose members were caught and executed in February 1943, shortly after the German capitulation at Stalingrad.

Actress Lena Stolze, who played Sophie Scholl, reprised that role in Fünf letzte Tage (Five Last Days), also released in 1982. That film was later remade as Sophie Scholl: The Final Days in 2005.

== Plot ==
Munich 1942: The student group White Rose, among them the Scholl siblings, have started to produce and distribute leaflets calling for resistance against Hitler and his regime. Risking their lives, they take leaflets to other cities and write slogans such as "Down with Hitler" on the walls of houses at night. As the Gestapo's noose tightens around the students, they make contact with other resistance groups and even with high military officials. In early 1943, the Gestapo strikes. Hans and Sophie Scholl are arrested in the courtyard of the Ludwig-Maximilians-Universität München. The People's Court under its chairman Freisler sentences them to death. The sentence is carried out on February 22, 1943.

In the credits, the director points out that the death sentences of the People's Court were still legally valid at the time the film was completed. It was not until 1998 that the sentences of the People's Court were repealed by the Law on the Repeal of National Socialist Unjust Sentences in the Administration of Criminal Justice.

== Director and stars ==
Director Michael Verhoeven released another film dealing with the Nazi era, The Nasty Girl. Lena Stolze, the actress portraying Sophie Scholl, one of the White Rose participants, performed the starring role in The Nasty Girl.

== Distribution ==
Distribution of the film beyond West Germany was delayed. This was because, at the time, the wartime German legal decision that outlawed the White Rose group effectively banned foreign distribution of the film, and this had to be rescinded before it could be released.
