= The German Chainsaw Massacre =

- DVD cover
- Directed by: Christoph Schlingensief
- Written by: Christoph Schlingensief
- Produced by: Gerd Hecker; Horst Riesenfeld
- Starring: Karina Fallenstein; Alfred Edel; Udo Kier; Volker Spengler; Irm Hermann; Susanne Bredehöft; Dietrich Kuhlbrodt; Brigitte Kausch; Artur Albrecht; Rainald Schnell; Helmut Kohl
- Cinematography: Christoph Schlingensief; Voxi Bärenklau
- Edited by: Ariane Traub
- Music by: Jacques Arr
- Release date: 1990
- Running time: 60 minutes
- Country: Germany
- Language: German

The German Chainsaw Massacre - The First Hour of the Reunification (German: Das deutsche Kettensägenmassaker), also known as Blackest Heart in the United States, is a 1990 German horror film written and directed by Christoph Schlingensief and starring Karina Fallenstein, Alfred Edel, Udo Kier and Irm Hermann. It is the second film in Schlingensief's Deutschlandtrilogie (German Trilogy).

== Plot ==
Set against the background of German reunification in 1990, the plot centers on a group of East Germans who cross the border to visit West Germany and get slaughtered by a psychopathic West German cannibal family with chainsaws who want to turn them into sausages.

== Cast ==
- Alfred Edel as Alfred
- Karina Fallenstein as Clara
- Artur Albrecht as Ihr Liebhaber
- Susanne Bredehöft as Ihr Mann / Margit
- Brigitte Kausch as Brigitte
- Volker Spengler as Henk
- Dietrich Kuhlbrodt as Dietrich
- Reinald Schnell as Kurti
- Udo Kier as Jonny
- Eva-Maria Kurz as Zöllnerin
- Irm Hermann as DDR-Grenzerin

== Production ==
Schlingensief conceived the idea for the film after he had viewed bootleg copies of The Texas Chain Saw Massacre and its sequel The Texas Chainsaw Massacre 2 (which were both banned in Germany) and found the second film to be "superb for its richness in imagery and double entendres". He wrote the script in a matter of days after the German reunification.

== Reception ==
Time Out lauded the film as "abrasive, relentless, cruelly funny and enjoyably deranged." Sean Leonard of HorrorNews.net calling it "an artsy, gory horror movie in the vein of Tobe Hooper’s classic", with the director's pointed social commentary.

== See also ==
- The Texas Chainsaw Massacre franchise
- List of German films of the 1990s
