= Midas and Bacchus (Poussin) =

Painting by Nicolas Poussin

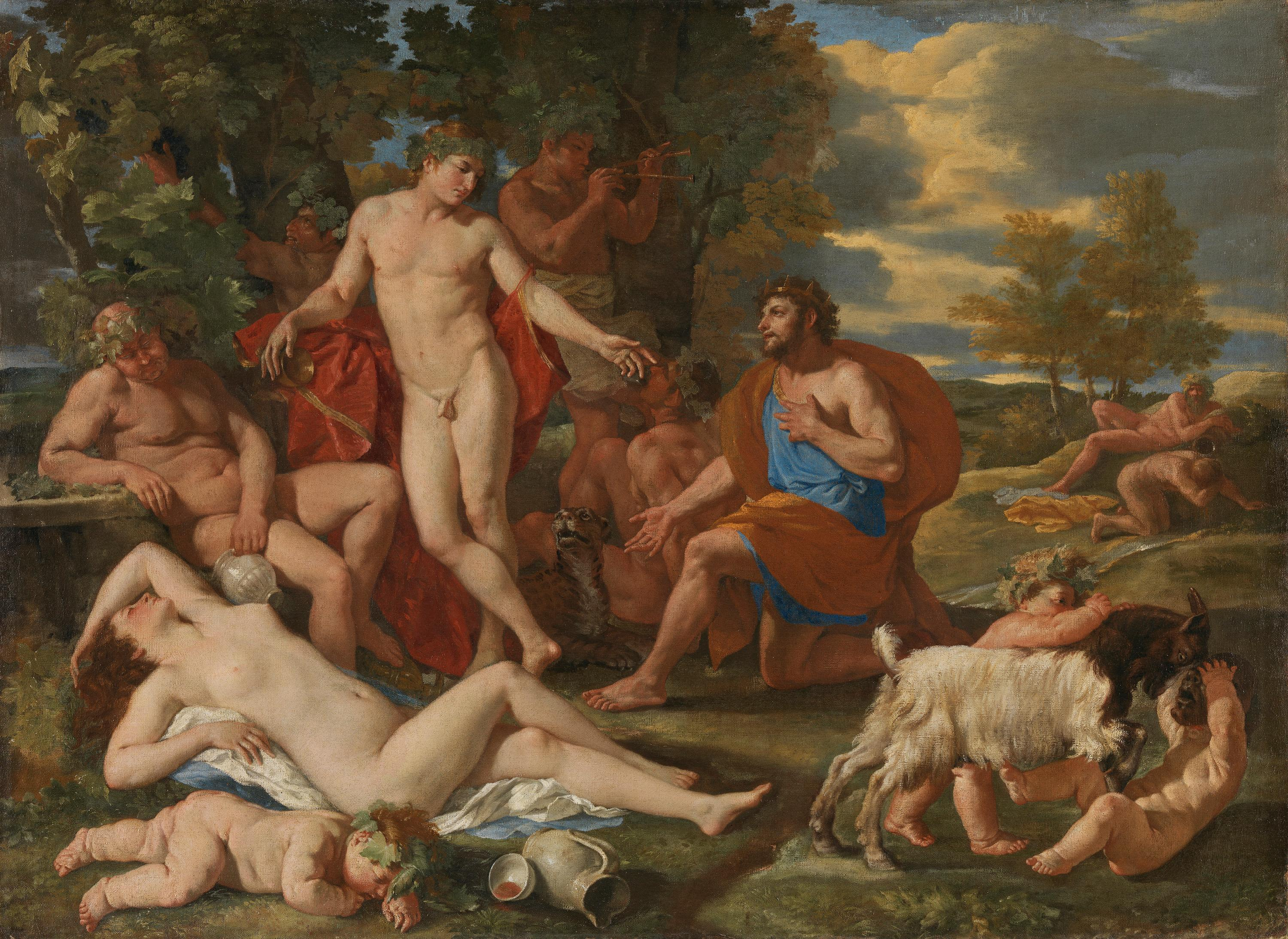
Midas and Bacchus, 98 x 130 cm

Midas and Bacchus (German: Midas und Bacchus) is an oil painting usually attributed to Nicolas Poussin and dated to about 1624–1629, which is now in the Alte Pinakothek, Munich.

== Description ==
This subject exhibits the avaricious King of Phrygia, attired in a blue vesture and a yellow mantle, bending on one knee supplicating Bacchus to take back the power with which he had endowed him, of changing whatever he touched into gold. The deity stands near, holding a cup in one hand, while the other is compassionately extended towards the suffering king. Silenus is recumbent near them, and a beautiful nymph lies naked asleep on the foreground, with an infant by her side. Beyond this group are three fauns, one of whom is seated drinking, a second is playing on a double pipe, and a third is gathering fruit. In addition to these, on the right, may be noticed two boys playing with a goat, and more remote are a recumbent river god and a youth; the latter is kneeling on the bank of a stream. The surrounding country represents a beautiful Arcadian scene.

== Attribution ==
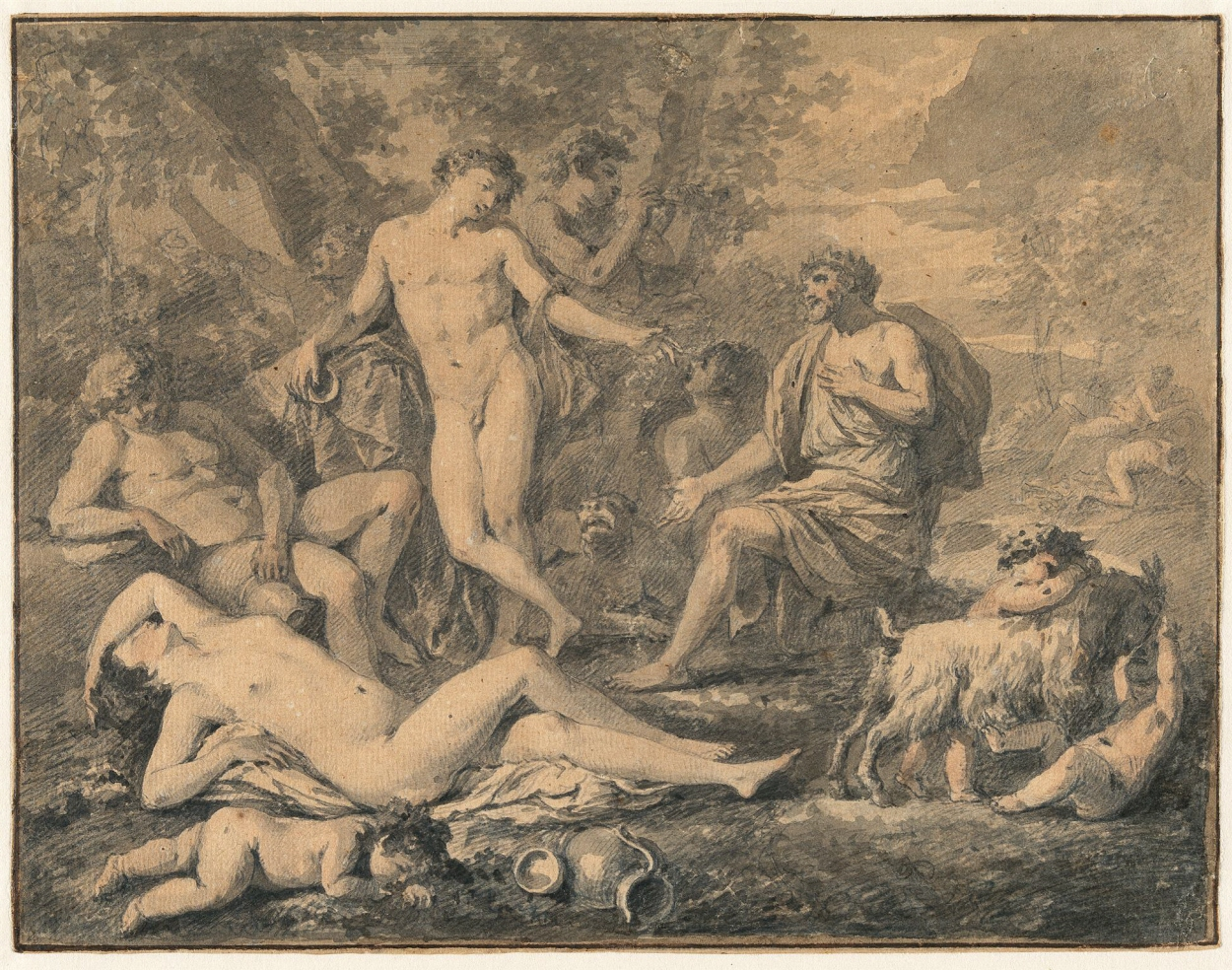
Drawing by Adam Friedrich Oeser after Poussin, 19.1 x 25.2 cm (Hamburger Kunsthalle)

Blunt (1966), citing the confused iconography and awkward spatial awareness of the composition, disputes the authenticity of this picture, which he tentatively ascribes to the so-called Heytesbury Master. However, it is accepted by Wright (2007) and the Alte Pinakothek as an early work of Poussin.

== Provenance ==
First recorded in the inventory of the Nymphenburg Palace, Munich, in 1751. Thence moved to the Alte Pinakothek in 1836..

== Legacy ==
The painting can be seen draped over the wall in Rainer Werner Fassbinder's The Bitter Tears of Petra von Kant.. The work looms an entire wall of the boudoir, the sole filing location, symbolizing the film's themes of sexuality and perception.

== Bibliography ==
- Blunt, Anthony (1966). The Paintings of Nicolas Poussin. Critical Catalogue. London: Phaidon. pp. 3, 176 (no. R89).
- Smith, John (1837). A Catalogue Raisonné of the Works of the Most Eminent Dutch, Flemish and French Painters: Nicholas Poussin, Claude Lorraine, and Jean Baptist Greuze. Vol. 8. London: Smith and Son. pp. 136–137 (no. 272).
- Wright, Christopher (1985). Poussin. Paintings. A Catalogue Raisonné. England: Harlequin Books Ltd. pp. 158–159 (no. 49).
- Wright, Christopher (2007). Poussin. Paintings. A Catalogue Raisonné. London: Chaucer Press. p. 82 (no. 49).
