= Zurich (film) =

2013 German film

- Film poster
- Directed by: Frederik Steiner
- Written by: Barbara te Kock
- Produced by: Peter Heilrath; Sven Burgemeister; Andreas Bareiss
- Starring: Liv Lisa Fries; Lena Stolze
- Cinematography: Florian Emmerich
- Edited by: Bernd Schlegel
- Music by: Daniel Sus
- Production companies: Peter Heilrath Filmproduktion; Goldkind Filmproduktion; ARRI Film & TV Services; ARTE; Südwestrundfunk (SWR)
- Distributed by: Universum Film
- Release date: 14 February 2013
- Running time: 102 minutes
- Countries: Germany, Switzerland
- Language: German
- Box office: €42,000

Zurich, original title Und morgen Mittag bin ich tot (transl. And I'll be dead tomorrow noon), is a 2013 German drama comedy directed by Frederik Steiner and written by Barbara te Kock starring Liv Lisa Fries. It tells the story of a young woman called Lea (played by Fries) suffering from a severe form of cystic fibrosis. Since the disease is already in an advanced stage, Lea decides to travel to Switzerland and request euthanasia there. She asks her family to visit her so they can be together one last time and tells them she wants to die on her 23rd birthday at 12 PM (hence the German title). The film shows how Lea and her family deal with the situation.

The movie was Steiner's first narrative film. Following its release at the Berlinale 2014, the film was only shown in a few cinemas in Berlin due to its emotional and difficult subject matter. It received wide critical acclaim, especially for Fries' performance and its realistic portrayal of cystic fibrosis and euthanasia. It was first shown in the United States at the Chicago Film Festival in 2014.

== Plot ==
Lea (Fries) has been suffering from cystic fibrosis since her childhood. She is 22 years old now and has to live in constant fear of suffocation despite using an oxygen concentrator. Although taking pills to diminish her symptoms, Lea can barely fulfill everyday tasks like climbing stairs without having to catch her breath after a short while. Her older brother who suffered from the same disease died several years ago after a lung transplant. Their father left the family because of his children's disease and now lives in South America.

Because of her situation, she wants to die on her 23rd birthday at noon. Since euthanasia is illegal in Germany, Lea approaches a Swiss organisation which offers assisted euthanasia. She travels to Zürich without telling her family. She moves into a hostel where she gets picked up by Michaela Orff, an employee of the organisation. She brings Lea to Dr. Seydlitz who prescribes her a controlled substance after being convinced of the young woman's very poor health.

Afterwards, Lea sends text messages to her family members. When they arrive, Lea tells them of her plans. Her grandmother Maria and her sister Rita are shocked, but accept her decision while her mother Lena strongly refuses to do so. After a conversation with Lea, Lena is still heartbroken but understands her daughter's motives.

At the hostel, Lea meets Moritz, a man her age. He suffers from severe depressions and tried to end his life by slitting his wrists. He applied for euthanasia, too, but got rejected. Lea befriends him, and they go boating on the Lake Zurich.

The day before Lea's planned death, the family visits a restaurant because Lea wants to eat "a last schnitzel". They spend a pleasant evening and clink their glasses at midnight to celebrate Lea's birthday. She quips about death several times, saying that she will "never be lovesick again, never climb stairs again, never fear suffocation again." When they return to the hostel and go to bed, Lea has a fit during which she coughs painfully and desperately gasps for air.

The next day, the family goes to the organisation after having breakfast. Miss Orff informs Lea that she can still cancel her plans, but Lea takes the antiemetic that will prevent her from vomiting. Suddenly, Lea gets a panic attack and rushes to a bathroom. When she sees her reflection in one of the mirrors, she remembers her stage and decides to finish what she started.

Her family and Michaela Orff accompany her to a nearby playground. She drinks the overdosed hypnotic and falls asleep in her mother's arms.

== Cast ==
- Liv Lisa Fries as Lea
- Lena Stolze as Lena
- Sophie Rogall as Rita
- Max Hegelwald as Moritz
- Kerstin de Ahna as Maria
- Johannes Zirner as Heiner
- Bibiana Beglau as Michaela Orff
- Robert-Hunger Bühler as Dr. Seydlitz
- Minh-Khai Phan-Thi as Frau Wu, the hostel manager

== Awards and nominations ==
- 2013: Won Best Young Actress (German: "Nachwuchsdarstellerin") for Liv Lisa Fries at the Bavarian Film Awards
- 2014: Won Best Young Actress for Liv Lisa Fries during the Max Ophüls Film Festival
- 2014: Won Best Actress for Liv Lisa Fries at the Preis der deutschen Filmkritik (German Film Critics Association Awards)
- 2013: Nomination for the MFG Star for Frederik Steiner during the Baden-Baden TV Film Festival
- 2013: Nomination for Best Directorial Debut for Frederik Steiner during the Camerimage Film Festival
- 2014: Nomination for Audience Choice Award for Frederik Steiner during the Chicago International Film Festival
- 2014: Nomination for Max Ophüls Award for Frederik Steiner during the Max Ophüls Film Festival
- 2015: Nomination for Best German Actress for Liv Lisa Fries at the Jupiter Awards
