= Maschenka (1987 film) =

- Directed by: John Goldschmidt
- Screenplay by: John Mortimer
- Based on: Mary by Vladimir Nabokov
- Produced by: Manfred D. Heid
- Starring: Cary Elwes; Irina Brook; Sunnyi Melles; Jonathan Coy; Freddie Jones; Michael Gough; Lena Stolze; Jean-Claude Brialy
- Cinematography: Wolfgang Treu
- Edited by: Tanja Schmidbauer
- Music by: Nick Glowna
- Distributed by: Goldcrest Films
- Release date: 1987
- Running time: 103 minutes
- Countries: West Germany, United Kingdom, France, Finland
- Language: English

Maschenka (Russian: Машенька, Mashen'ka; English: Mary) is a 1987 international film adaptation of the debut novel by Vladimir Nabokov, first published under his pen name V. Sirin in 1926. The film was directed by John Goldschmidt from a screenplay by John Mortimer and stars Cary Elwes as Ganin and Irina Brook as Maschenka.

== Plot ==
The story, said by Nabokov to be semi-autobiographical, is of Lev Glebovich Ganin, a Russian émigré who has been displaced by the Russian Revolution. Now living in a boarding house in Berlin, Ganin discovers that his long-lost first love, Maschenka, is the wife of the rather unappealing boarder next door, Alfyrov, and that she is on her way to rejoin her husband. This knowledge, combined with the incessant recitation of his memories of old Russia by another boarder, Podtyagin, sends him into a state of reverie. Ganin contrives a complex scheme in order to reunite with Maschenka, who he believes still loves him.

== Cast ==
Actor	Role
Cary Elwes	Ganin
Irina Brook	Maschenka
Sunnyi Melles	Lilli
Jonathan Coy	Alferov
Freddie Jones	Podtyagin
Michael Gough	Vater
Jean-Claude Brialy	Kolin
Lena Stolze	Klara
Vernon Dobtcheff	Yasha
Constantine Gregory	Pyotr

== Production ==
The motion picture was filmed on location in West Berlin, West Germany and in Helsinki and Katajanokka, Finland. For the sequence depicting Maschenka's arrival by train the producers rented the Russian Imperial Finnish train that once belonged to the Romanov family.

The filming was shadowed by the Chernobyl disaster. Actor Cary Elwes later recounted,

I recall a crew meeting being called on a set in a place called Katajanokka, in Helsinki, ... and being told that there was nothing to fear because the winds were in our favor and that the fallout was likely to be blown in another direction. We were warned, however, that as a precaution we probably shouldn't drink the local milk. At least not until it had been declared safe. Like a good many of the others on the crew, I went back to work, scratching my head, wondering if we shouldn't be taking the whole thing more seriously. We were, after all, only eight hundred miles away from the accident. All I can say is that insurance policies for the film industry back then were not as sophisticated as they are now, so shutting down production wasn't really an option. [emphasis in original]

== Awards ==
Goldschmidt won the Cine De Luca Award for Directing at the Monte Carlo TV Festival.
