= From Hilde, with Love =

2024 German film by Andreas Dresen

- Theatrical release poster
- German: In Liebe, Eure Hilde
- Directed by: Andreas Dresen
- Written by: Laila Stieler
- Produced by: Claudia Steffen; Christoph Friedel; Regina Ziegler
- Starring: Liv Lisa Fries
- Cinematography: Judith Kaufmann
- Edited by: Jörg Hauschild
- Music by: Jens Quandt
- Production companies: Pandora Film Produktion GmbH; Leuchtstoff; Arte
- Distributed by: Pandora Film Verleih [de]
- Release dates: 17 February 2024 (Berlinale); 17 October 2024 (Germany)
- Running time: 125 minutes
- Country: Germany
- Language: German
- Box office: $696,618

From Hilde, with Love (German: In Liebe, Eure Hilde) is a 2024 German biographical film about Hilde Coppi, who along with her husband Hans Coppi belonged to Red Orchestra, a German resistance group to Nazism. Directed by Andreas Dresen, the film stars Liv Lisa Fries in titular role of Hilde Coppi and Johannes Hegemann as Hans Coppi.

The film was selected in the Competition at the 74th Berlin International Film Festival to be held from 15 to 25 February 2024, where it competed for the Golden Bear with its first screening on 17 February at Berlinale Palast.

== Synopsis ==
The film is a drama of short life, about love and death based on true events of World War II. In early 1942 in Berlin, Hilde Coppi, a young medical assistant, became part of a rebel group that was later known as the "Red Orchestra". There she met and fell in love with Hans Coppi, who later became her husband. They enjoyed a wonderful summer together, despite the danger of their activities and the risk of being caught. Eventually captured by the Gestapo, Hilde was imprisoned while pregnant. She gave birth to a son in Barnimstrasse women's prison, and soon after, she was condemned to death. In her final months, being a mother gave her the strength to face her destiny.

== Cast ==
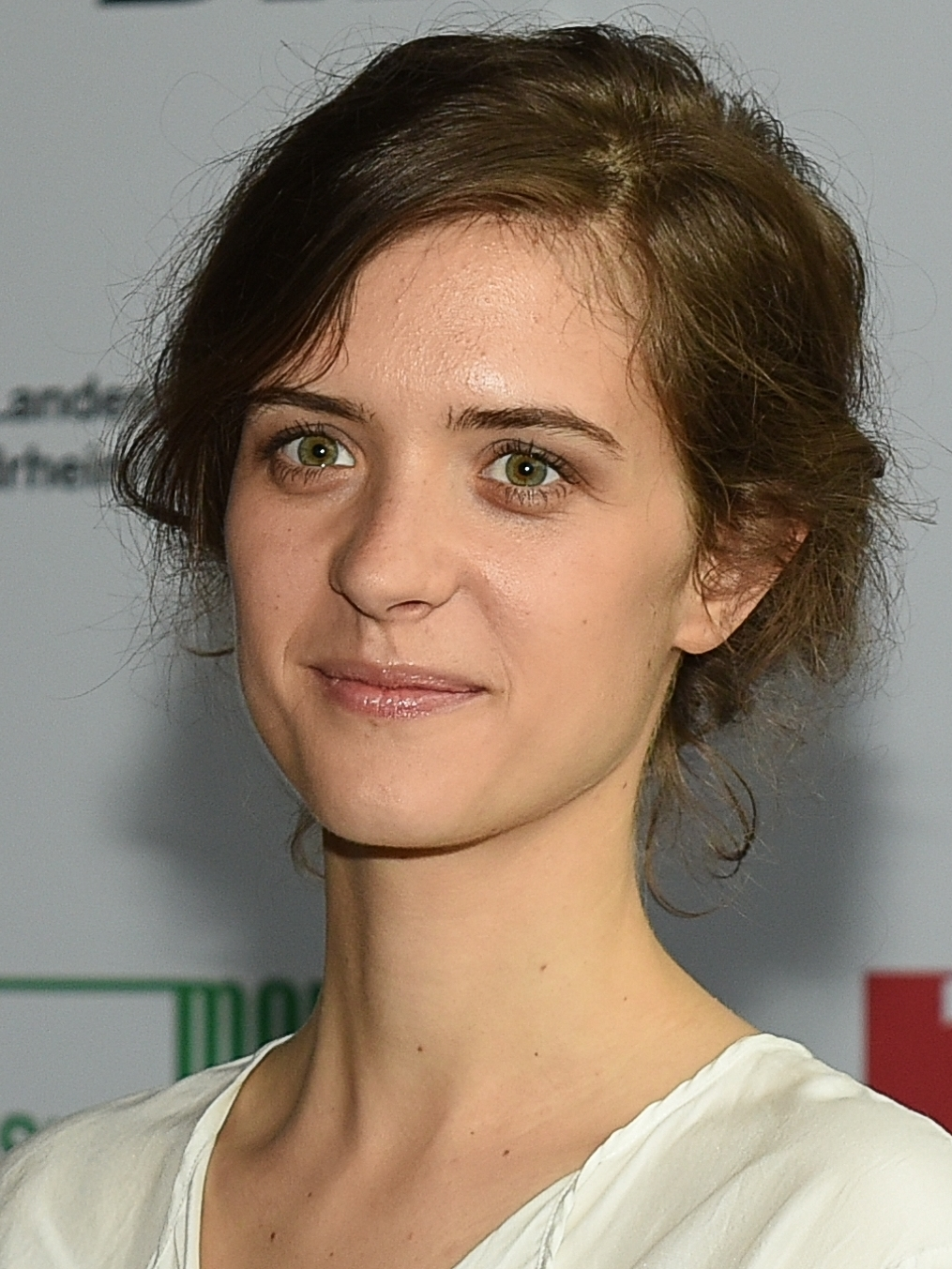
Liv Lisa Fries in 2018

- Liv Lisa Fries as Hilde Coppi
- Johannes Hegemann as Hans Coppi
- Gabriela Maria Schmeide
- Emma Bading as Ina Lautenschläger
- Sina Martens as Libertas Schulze-Boysen
- Lisa Hrdina as Grete
- Lena Urzendowsky as Liane Berkowitz
- Hans-Christian Hegewald as Albert Hößler
- Heike Hanold-Lynch as Frieda Coppi
- Tilla Kratochwil as Hilde's mother
- Lisa Wagner as Anneliese Kühn

== Production ==
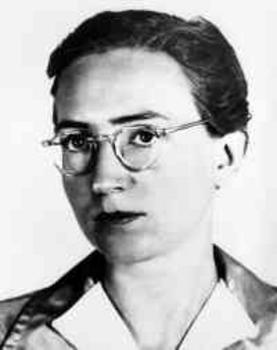
Hilde Coppi in 1940

In May 2022, Liv Lisa Fries was cast as the lead to play titular role of Hilde Coppi. Laila Stieler wrote the script for the producers Pandora Film Produktion's Claudia Steffen and Christoph Friedel with Cooky Ziesche's Leuchtstoff (Initiative von RBB und Medienboard Berlin) [de], Regina Ziegler's Ziegler Film GmbH & Co. KG, and Dresen and Andreas Leusink's Iskremas Filmproduktion GmbH [de].

Principal photography began on 22 August 2022 on locations in Berlin, Potsdam, Groß Köris, Ketzin-Schmergow, and Krahnepuhl. Filming ended on 6 October 2022 with filming locations in the regions of Berlin and Brandenburg.

== Release ==
From Hilde, with Love had its world premiere on 17 February 2024, as part of the 74th Berlin International Film Festival, in Competition.

Beta Cinema GmbH has international rights to the film. In March, Picturehouse took the distribution rights of the film.

It was released theatrically on 17 October in Germany.

It will be showcased in the official selection Out of competition at the Luxembourg City Film Festival on 10 March, 2025.

== Reception ==
From Hilde with Love grossed $696,618 at the box office, worldwide.

On the review aggregator Rotten Tomatoes website, the film has an approval rating of 80% based on 10 reviews, with an average rating of 6/10.

Leslie Felperin reviewing the film for The Hollywood Reporter termed it as "Top-drawer humanist cinema," and opined, "From Hilde feels tidy and complete, speaking like its heroine with a soft still voice about the importance of love, and the deep need to do something right, no matter how small, to defy corrupt, monstrous regimes."

Catherine Bray writing in Variety praised Liv Lisa Fries, for her "subtle but layered performance." Bray mentioned Judith Kaufmann writing, "his cinematography, leaning into the sylvan charms of the Red Orchestra’s hangout, underscoring the brutality of the prison environment to which the film constantly returns." Bray praised Jörg Hauschild for doing "a good job balancing the edit between these two kinds of scene, with the prison narrative proceeding in a linear fashion to its grim conclusion, while the vignettes from prior to Hilde’s arrest jump forwards and backwards in time." Concluding her review she opined, "From Hilde, with Love might be set almost eighty years ago, but the themes explored seem destined to remain eternally urgent and relevant."

Lee Marshall reviewing for ScreenDaily at Berlinale wrote, "The story of the German resistance to the Nazi regime has been told before in books, documentaries and fictional features, but rarely so freshly and movingly as in this account..." Praising performance Marshall wrote, "Liv Lisa Fries gives a compelling performance as a woman who at first, the film suggests, was something of an accidental revolutionary, brought into the anti-Nazi resistance through her love for the man who in 1941 would become her husband." Concluding Marshall said, "... in its final act, the film builds to a dramatic, moving crescendo, it does so not by hammering away at the injustice of Hilde’s fate – that’s a given – but by celebrating the small joys of parenthood, the touch of a lover’s skin and the adrenalin of a common cause."

Nicholas Bell in Ion Cinema rated the film with two stars and said, "In our attempts to never forget the atrocities of the Holocaust, should we not make more of a collective effort to steer clear of making forgettable films?"

== Accolades ==
The film was selected in Competition at the 74th Berlin International Film Festival, thus it was nominated to compete for Golden Bear award.

Award	Date	Category	Recipient	Result	Ref.
Berlin International Film Festival	25 February 2024	Golden Bear	Andreas Dresen	Nominated	
