= Lena Stolze =

German actress (born 1956)

- Born: 8 August 1956 (age 70); East Berlin, East Germany
- Occupation: Actress
- Years active: 1970s–present

Lena Stolze (born 8 August 1956) is a German television and film actress.

== Life and work ==
Lena Stolze's father is Gerhard Stolze, a tenor, and her mother is the actress Gabi Stolze. In 1961, the family moved from East Germany to Vienna.

Lena Stolze is best known for playing Sophie Scholl in Fünf letzte Tage and Die Weiße Rose (Both 1982), and for her role as Sonja (a fictionalized version of Anna Rosmus) in Das schreckliche Mädchen (1990).

She and Julia Jentsch both won the Film Award in Gold at the German Film Awards as "Best Actress" for portraying Sophie Scholl, in their separate portrayals, in Die Weiße Rose (1982) and Die Letzen Tage (2005), respectively.

== Awards ==
- 1983 Bavarian Film Awards, Best Actress

== Filmography ==
- 1978
  - Lemminge (TV film)
- 1982
  - Fünf letzte Tage (Last Five Days, film)
  - Die Weiße Rose (The White Rose, film)
- 1984
  - Die Schaukel (The Swing, film)
  - Morgen in Alabama (Man Under Suspicion, film)
- 1987
  - Maschenka (film)
- 1989
  - Das schreckliche Mädchen (The Nasty Girl, film)
- 1992
  - Struppi & Wolf (TV film)
- 1993
  - Wehner – die unerzählte Geschichte (TV film)
  - Dance of Death (Todesreigen, TV film)
- 1994
  - Die Vergebung (Forgiveness, TV film)
  - Nur der Sieg zählt (TV film)
- 1995
  - Brother of Sleep (film)
  - Diebinnen (Women Robbers, film)
  - The Public Prosecutor (TV series, 3 episodes)
  - Ärzte: Dr. Vogt – Afrika vergessen (TV series episode)
- 1996
  - The Writing on the Wall – Operation Schmetterling (UK/Germany, TV film)
  - Mein Herz – Niemanden! (My Heart Is Mine Alone, film)
- 1997
  - Winterkind (TV film)
  - Gefangene der Liebe (TV film)
- 1999
  - Relative Strangers – Verwandte Fremde (UK/Germany, TV film)
- 2000
  - Brennendes Schweigen (TV film)
- 2001
  - Ein starkes Team: Der schöne Tod (TV series episode)
  - Stubbe: Unschuldsengel (TV series episode)
  - Späte Rache (TV film)
- 2002
  - Tatort: Schlaf, Kindlein, schlaf (TV series episode)
  - Die Cleveren: Herbstkinder (TV series episode)
  - Schlosshotel Orth: Verborgene Schätze (TV series episode)
  - I'm the Father (film)
- 2003
  - Rosenstrasse (film)
  - Der Pfundskerl: Engel – Retter der Senioren (TV series episode)
- 2004
  - Delfinsommer (TV film)
  - Tatort: Bitteres Brot (TV series episode)
  - Northern Star (film)
  - Gun-Shy (film)
- 2005
  - Die Affäre Kaminski (TV film)
- 2006
  - Bis dass der Tod euch scheidet (TV film)
  - Tatort: Unter uns (TV series episode)
  - Tatort: Aus der Traum (TV series episode)
  - Doppelter Einsatz: Rumpelstilzchen (TV series episode)
  - Tatort: Das verlorene Kind (TV series episode)
  - Lapislazuli (film)
- 2007
  - And Along Come Tourists (film)
- 2011
  - A Family of Three (film)
- 2013
  - Zurich (film)
- 2014
  - The Chosen Ones (TV film)
