= Else Gebel =

German communist resistance fighter (1905–1964)

Else Gebel (July 1905 – 1964) was a communist member of the German resistance to Nazism. She is remembered for having been the cellmate of Sophie Scholl in the Gestapo headquarters in the Wittelsbacher Palais of Munich before Scholl's execution.

== Life ==
Else Gebel was born in Augsburg. She grew up together with her two brothers, Willy and Arno. She had a close relationship with Willy and both of them shared an apartment until 1935. Gebel's mother died when Else was aged 20. The three siblings were critical of Nazism. Until Kristallnacht pogrom, which occurred on 9–10 November 1938, Gebel worked as chief secretary for the Jewish merchant Max Uhlfelder in Munich. Uhlfelder's department store was destroyed during Kristallnacht, and Uhlfelder himself was arrested and brought to the Dachau concentration camp. Gebel however was able to avoid bringing attention to herself. Until her own arrest, she worked at the Diamalt company which produced malt extract for bakeries.

Gebel and her brother Willy were members of the Aufbruch working team, and later of the communist resistance group led by Beppo Römer and Robert Uhrig. On 20 June 1944, she was sentenced to one year and four months of forced labour in jail, and had to work as a bookkeeper for the Nazi administration.

During her pre-trial custody, Gebel came to know the resistance fighter Sophie Scholl after Scholl's arrest on 18 February 1943, befriended her and engaged her in conversation. Sophie Scholl, her brother Hans and their friend Christoph Probst were sentenced to death and hurriedly executed on 22 February 1943.

After World War II, Gebel kept many memories of her cellmate, which were presented in film in Fünf letzte Tage (1982) and Sophie Scholl – The Final Days (2005). Else Gebel died in 1964.
