= Liv Lisa Fries =

German actress (born 1990)

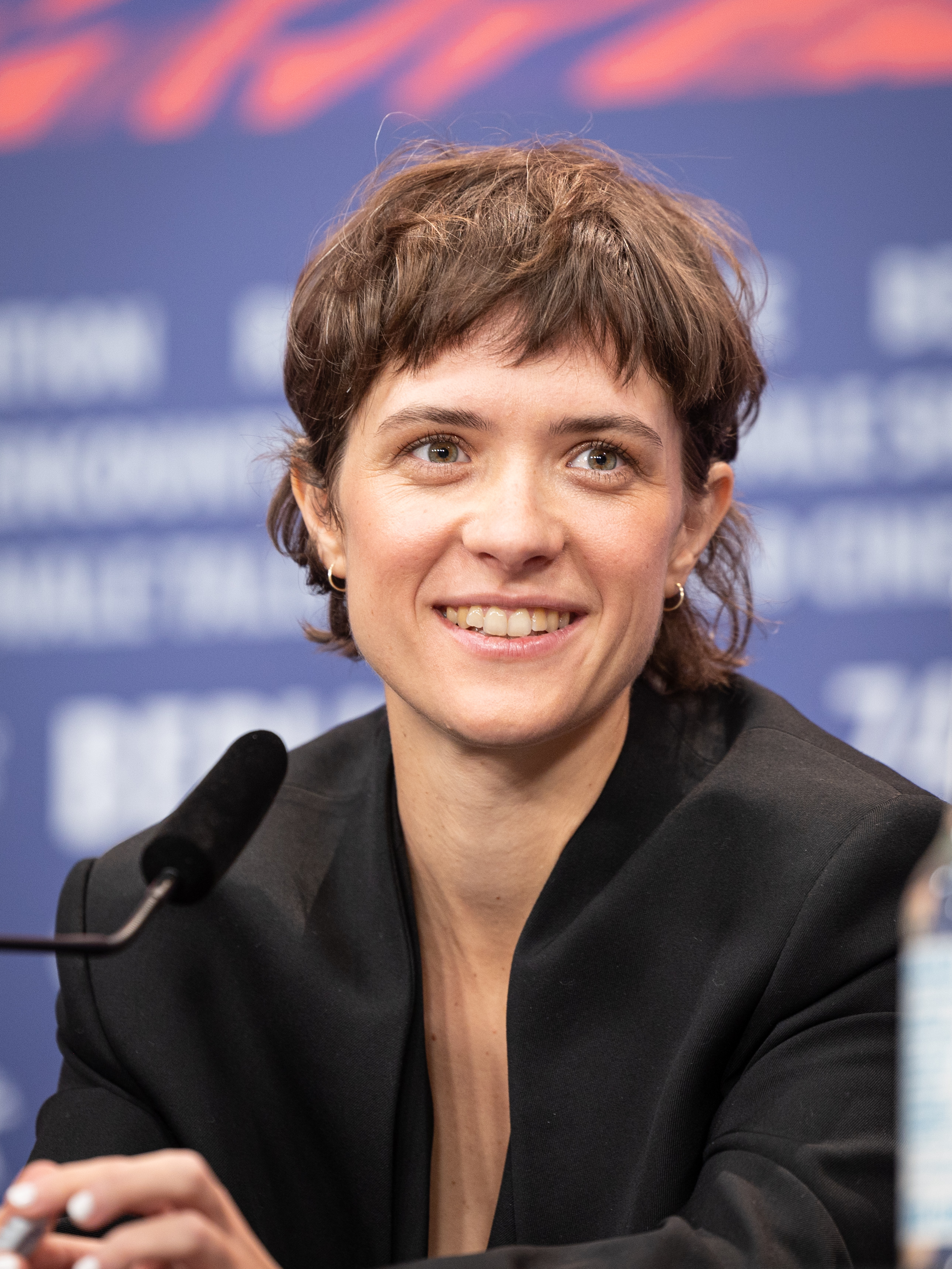
- Fries at the Berlinale 2024
- Born: Liv Lisa Fries; 31 October 1990 (age 35); Berlin, Germany
- Occupation: Actress
- Years active: 2005–present

Liv Lisa Fries (born 31 October 1990) is a German actress. She is best known internationally as the female lead Charlotte Ritter in the German TV series Babylon Berlin, which premiered in 2017, and has also appeared in several films, including Hinterland (2021) and From Hilde, With Love (2024).

== Early life and education ==
Liv Lisa Fries was born on 31 October 1990 at the Charité hospital in Berlin. She was raised in the Berlin borough of Pankow.

As an exchange student, Fries studied in Beijing. In addition to native German, she speaks English, French and Mandarin.

After receiving her Abitur in 2010, Fries took advanced classes in philosophy and German, but dropped out as her career as an actress progressed.

== Career ==
Fries wanted to become an actress when she was 14 years old after watching Léon: The Professional, because she was impressed by Natalie Portman's performance. After making her debut in 2005, Fries has gone on to appear in many acting roles, the majority of which have come in German films and TV series such as Zurich, Add a Friend, and The Wave. Her first film role was in Atomised (2005) (German: Elementarteilchen); however, her role was cut from the film. She then appeared in 2006 in an episode of Schimanski, in which she played the female lead role.

Fries performed in the German made-for-television film She Deserved It (2010) as an aggressive, frustrated teenager named Linda who tortures one of her peers. Fries said that during filming, she started feeling lonely and isolated, just like her character.

In 2013, she starred in the German tragicomedy Zurich (original title Und morgen Mittag bin ich tot). She received critical acclaim for her performance as Lea, a young woman with cystic fibrosis. According to Fries, she prepared for the role by meeting with a patient with the disease, in addition to running up stairs while breathing through a straw. For her role, she was awarded the Bavarian Film Prize in 2013, the Max Ophüls Prize, a German Film Critics Award, and the German Director's Prize.

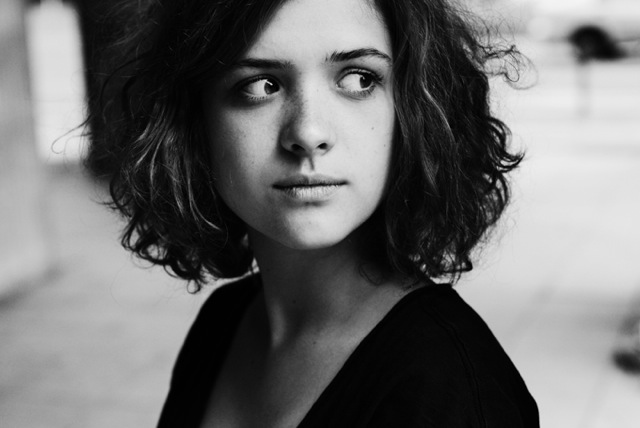
Fries in 2012

Fries received her most prominent role to date when she was cast in 2016 as Charlotte Ritter in the German television show Babylon Berlin, in which she stars as a police stenographer from a poor background who uses her resourcefulness and connections to investigate a series of crimes in Weimar Republic-era Berlin. The first two seasons of the show were filmed over eight months beginning in May 2016 and released consecutively from October–December 2017. Babylon Berlin has been very popular in Germany as well as with international audiences, and has elevated Fries to international prominence.

The show went on a year-long production hiatus during which Fries filmed two projects; she played a recurring role in both seasons of the 2017 American TV series Counterpart, and also co-starred in the film Prélude with Louis Hofmann. In late 2018, Fries began the six-month shoot for the third season of Babylon Berlin, which premiered in Germany in January 2020 and arrived on Sky Atlantic in March 2020. The fourth season premiered in 2022. The fifth and final season began filming in the winter of 2024 and completed filming in December 2025.

== Personal life ==
As of 2020, Fries lives in a village in Brandenburg. Her favourite hobby is horse riding.

== Selected filmography ==
=== Film ===
- The Wave (2008)
- Stronger Than Blood (2010)
- Romeos (2011)
- Zurich (2013)
- The Dam (2013)
- The Presence (2014)
- Boy 7 (2015)
- Heil (2015)
- Lou Andreas-Salomé, The Audacity to be Free (2016). This German-language movie is about Lou Andreas-Salomé.
- Rocket Perelman (Rakete Perelman) (2017)
- Prélude (2019)
- Hinterland (2021)
- Confessions of Felix Krull (2021)
- Munich – The Edge of War (2021)
- Zwischen uns (2021)
- Freud's Last Session (2023)
- From Hilde, With Love (2024)

=== Television ===
- She Deserved It (2010) (TV film)
- Polizeiruf 110 (2012) (TV episode)
- Frauen die Geschichte machten – Sophie Scholl (2013) (TV docudrama)
- Tatort (2014) (TV episode)
- NSU German History X (2016) (TV mini-series)
- Babylon Berlin (2017–present) (TV series)
- Counterpart (2017–19) (TV series)
- Kafka (2024)

== Awards ==
- 2012: Best Young Actress for She Deserved It (Goldene Kamera Awards)
- 2014: Best Young Actress for Zurich (Bavarian Film Awards)
- 2014: Best Young Actress for Zurich (Max-Ophüls-Preis)
- 2014: Best Actress for Zurich (Deutscher Regiepreis Metropolis)
- 2015: Best Actress for Zurich (Preis der deutschen Filmkritik)
- 2018: Grimme-Preis for Babylon Berlin (note: everyone with a major role in the production of the series won the award, including all three lead actors)
