= Sophie Scholl – The Final Days =

2005 film by Marc Rothemund

- Theatrical release poster
- Directed by: Marc Rothemund
- Written by: Fred Breinersdorfer
- Produced by: Fred Breinersdorfer; Sven Burgemeister; Christoph Müller; Marc Rothemund
- Starring: Julia Jentsch; Fabian Hinrichs
- Cinematography: Martin Langer
- Edited by: Hans Funck
- Music by: Reinhold Heil; Johnny Klimek
- Distributed by: X Verleih AG (through Warner Bros.)
- Release dates: 13 February 2005 (Berlinale); 24 February 2005 (Germany)
- Running time: 117 minutes
- Country: Germany
- Language: German
- Box office: US$13.9 million

Sophie Scholl – The Final Days (German: Sophie Scholl – Die letzten Tage) is a 2005 German historical drama film directed by Marc Rothemund and written by Fred Breinersdorfer. It is about the last days in the life of Sophie Scholl, a 21-year-old member of the anti-Nazi non-violent student resistance group the White Rose, part of the German Resistance movement. She was found guilty of high treason by the People's Court and executed the same day, 22 February 1943.

The film was presented at the 55th Berlin International Film Festival in February 2005 and won Silver Bear awards for Best Director and Best Actress (Julia Jentsch). It was nominated for an Academy Award for Best Foreign Language Film.

== Plot ==
In wartime Munich in February 1943, Sophie Scholl joins her brother Hans in the White Rose student organization. They have prepared an anti-government leaflet and have more copies than they can distribute by mail. Hans proposes distributing the extras at the Ludwig-Maximilians-Universität München and Sophie volunteers to assist. Hans and Sophie put stacks of leaflets near the lecture rooms while classes are in session. When Sophie pushes a stack of leaflets over a balustrade she is spotted by Jakob Schmid, a janitor, and the pair are detained for the Gestapo.

They are taken to the Wittelsbacher Palais headquarters where Sophie is interrogated by Gestapo investigator Robert Mohr. She denies that she and her brother had left the leaflets and claims to have pushed the stack off the railing as a prank. She explains the empty suitcase in her possession was for bringing back clothes from a visit to her parents in Ulm. She is remanded when the Gestapo announce they have incontrovertible evidence that Sophie and Hans were responsible for the distribution of the leaflets. She is placed in a cell with dissident Else Gebel, a Communist sympathizer.

Sophie confesses her part, contradicting her brother's claim he acted alone. Determined to protect the others, she steadfastly maintains that the distribution of thousands of leaflets throughout the region was the work of the siblings. Mohr, having learned that their father was an imprisoned dissident, urges her to support laws that preserve a society which has funded her welfare and education. Scholl counters that before 1933 the laws protected freedom of speech and denounces atrocities committed by the Nazis. Mohr dismisses some of her accusations, such as the extermination of the Jews, as wartime propaganda, but acknowledges others like the euthanasia program.

Sophie and Hans, as well as a friend with three young children, Christoph Probst, are charged with treason, troop demoralization and aiding the enemy. Four days after their arrest they are put on a show trial. Probst is examined first by President of the People's Court Roland Freisler, whose zeal makes the prosecutor and defense attorneys superfluous. Freisler contemptuously dismisses Probst's appeals to spare his life so that his children can have a father. Hans maintains his composure in the face of Freisler's impatient questioning. Declining to answer only what he is asked, he denounces German war crimes on the Eastern Front as immoral and proclaims that the defeat of the Nazi state by the Allies is all but certain. Sophie denies she was led by her brother, and declares that many people are scared to admit they agree with her group. Freisler pronounces the defendants guilty and calls on each to make a final statement. Sophie warns that "where we stand today, you [Freisler] will stand soon." All three are sentenced to death and transported to Stadelheim Prison.

Sophie, assuming a normal 99-day delay between conviction and execution, learns she is to be executed the same day. She breaks down briefly, but regains composure, writes a final statement and receives a blessing from the prison chaplain, who offers his support for her silence. After a visit by her parents, who also express approval of what she has done, Mohr arrives and sadly watches Sophie taken away. She is led into a cell with Christoph and Hans, and they share a final cigarette. Sophie is led into a courtyard and remarks "The sun is still shining". An appeal for clemency is declined by the Reich Ministry of Justice, and she is beheaded by guillotine. Hans screams "Let freedom live!" before the blade goes down, and Christoph is executed last. A caption lists dozens of adherents of the White Rose executed in the following months, while others suffered imprisonment.

In the final shot, thousands of leaflets fall from the sky over Munich. A narration explains that the sixth leaflet of the White Rose were smuggled through Scandinavia to the United Kingdom by Helmuth James Graf von Moltke, where the Allies then printed millions of copies of the "Manifesto of the Students of Munich" to drop over Germany.

== Cast ==
- Julia Jentsch as Sophia Magdalena 'Sophie' Scholl
- Fabian Hinrichs as Hans Fritz Scholl
- Alexander Held as Robert Mohr
- Johanna Gastdorf as Else Gebel
- André Hennicke as Dr. Roland Freisler
- Florian Stetter as Christoph Hermann Probst
- Maximilian Brückner as Willi Graf
- Johannes Suhm as Alexander Schmorell
- Lilli Jung as Gisela Schertling
- Petra Kelling as Magdalena Scholl
- Jörg Hube as Robert Scholl
- Franz Staber as Werner Scholl

== Reception ==
=== Critical response ===
Sophie Scholl – The Final Days has an approval rating of 87% on review aggregator website Rotten Tomatoes, based on 95 reviews, and an average rating of 7.27/10. The website's critical consensus states: "A film that begs the audience to reflect upon their own courage and strength of character in light of this young heroine's daring story". Metacritic assigned the film a weighted average score of 76 out of 100, based on 30 critics, indicating "generally favorable reviews".

=== Awards and recognition ===
- 55th Berlin International Film Festival, 2005
  - Nominated for Golden Bear
  - Silver Bear: Best Director – Marc Rothemund
  - Silver Bear: Best Actress – Julia Jentsch
- European Film Awards, 2005
  - Best European Actress – Julia Jentsch
  - Audience Award
- Bernhard-Wicki-Filmpreis, 2005
- German Film Awards (Lolas)
  - Audience Award
  - Best Film, Silver Prize
  - Best acting performance (female main role) – Julia Jentsch
- 78th Academy Awards, 2006
  - Nominated for Best Foreign Language Film

== Home media ==
Sophie Scholl – The Final Days was released on DVD in 2006 and Blu-ray in 2008. The DVD and Blu-Ray releases include as Extra Features interviews with Sophie's older sister Elisabeth Hartnagel, surviving White Rose member Franz Josef Müller, Willi Mohr, son of the Scholl's Gestapo interrogator Robert Mohr, and Walter Gebel, nephew of Sophie Scholl's cellmate Else Gebel.

== See also ==
- Die Weiße Rose (film) (1982)
- The Nasty Girl (1990)
- Jud Newborn
