= Günther Kaufmann =

German film actor (1947–2012)

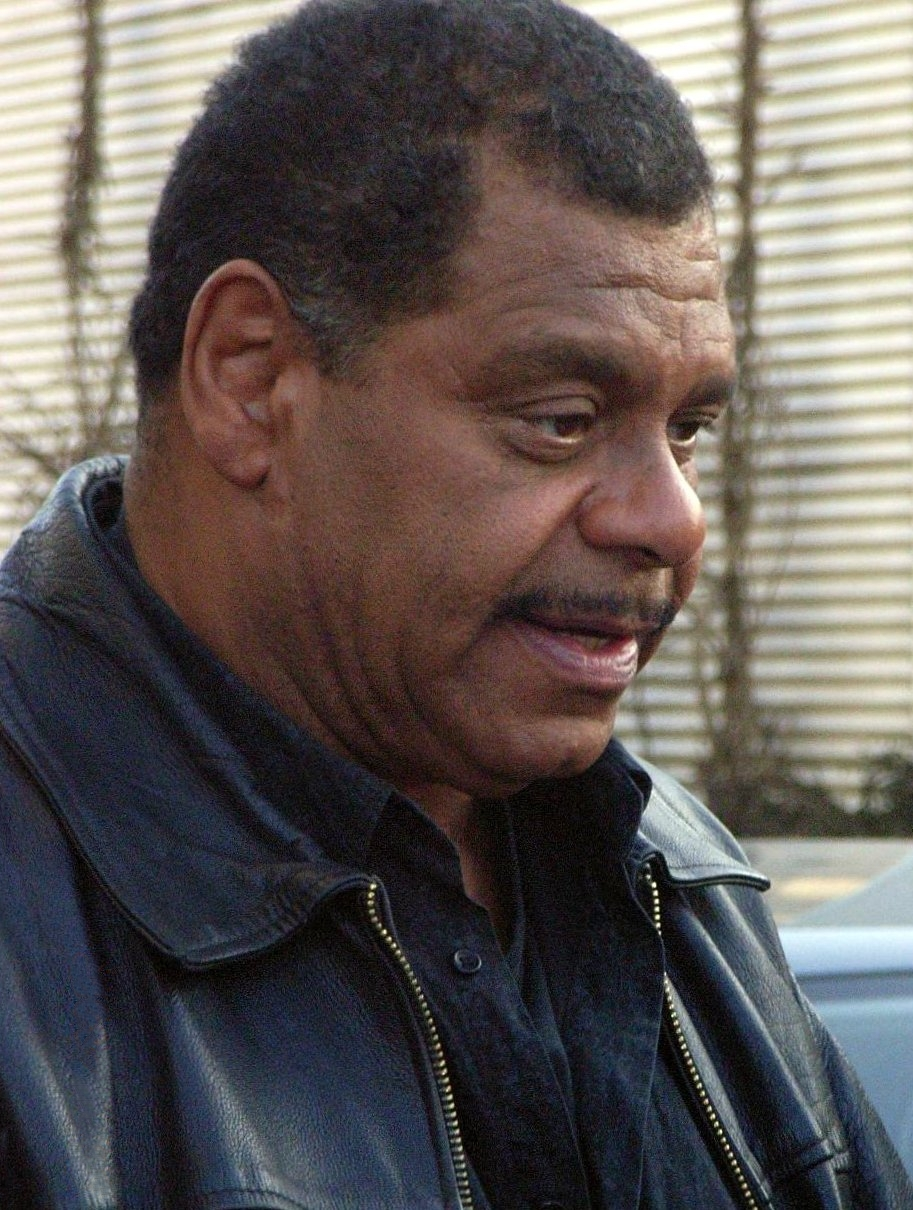
- Kaufmann on 29 January 2009
- Born: 16 June 1947; Munich, Allied-occupied Germany
- Died: 10 May 2012 (aged 64); Berlin, Germany
- Resting place: Nordfriedhof
- Occupation: Actor
- Years active: 1970–2012
- Spouses: Alexandra von Herrendorf (m. 1986; died 2002) Patrizia Kaufmann (m. 2005; div. 2010)
- Partner: Rainer Werner Fassbinder (1970–71)
- Children: 2

Günther Kaufmann (16 June 1947 – 10 May 2012) was a German actor, best known for his association with director Rainer Werner Fassbinder. He directed Kaufmann in a total of 14 films, casting him in leading and minor roles. He was also romantically involved with the director for a time.

In 2002, Kaufmann was accused of murder in relation to the 2001 death of Hartmut Hagen, a 60-year-old accountant whom Kaufmann's wife had defrauded. The death was ruled accidental, but Kaufmann was sentenced to prison for lesser crimes relating to the incident. In 2005, a new police investigation discovered that Kaufmann was innocent, and had confessed to the crimes to cover up for his late wife, who may have been the perpetrator. He was subsequently released from prison and resumed his acting career.

== Early life ==
Günther Kaufmann was born on 16 June 1947 in Munich's Hasenbergl neighborhood. His mother was German and his father was an African-American soldier stationed in Germany after World War II. He served in the German Navy from 1965 to 1969.

== Career ==
Not an actor by training, Kaufmann was discovered by Rainer Werner Fassbinder. His first role was in 1970, a bit part in a made-for-television production of Bertolt Brecht's play Baal, directed by Volker Schlöndorff. Fassbinder played the title role. The same year, Fassbinder cast Kaufmann in his film Gods of the Plague as a character named Günther.

=== Relationship with Fassbinder ===
Though Kaufmann was married when he met Fassbinder, the two men began a romantic relationship. Kaufmann is often described as Fassbinder's first major love interest. Like many of Fassbinder's relationships, it was troubled, and the director would often try to buy Kaufmann's affection with expensive presents, particularly cars. During their relationship, Fassbinder married Ingrid Caven, an actress who, like Kaufmann, regularly appeared in the director's films and was a member of his tightly knit circle of friends.

By 1971, Fassbinder and Kaufmann had split up, and the director began an even more troubled relationship with a Moroccan immigrant, El Hedi ben Salem. Kaufmann continued to appear in Fassbinder's films, sometimes also contributing songs to the soundtracks. He appeared in Fassbinder's last movie, Querelle (1982).

== Later career ==
After Fassbinder died of a drug overdose in 1982, Kaufmann played bit roles in films. In 1986, he married for a third time to Alexandra von Herrendorf, to whom he remained married until her death from cancer in 2002.

During the 1990s he began to act more frequently, appearing in recurring roles on many television shows, but acting jobs began to dry up for him around 2000. His wife's cancer was getting worse, and it was to pay for her treatment that the Kaufmanns defrauded their accountant, Hartmut Hagen, of almost $500,000.

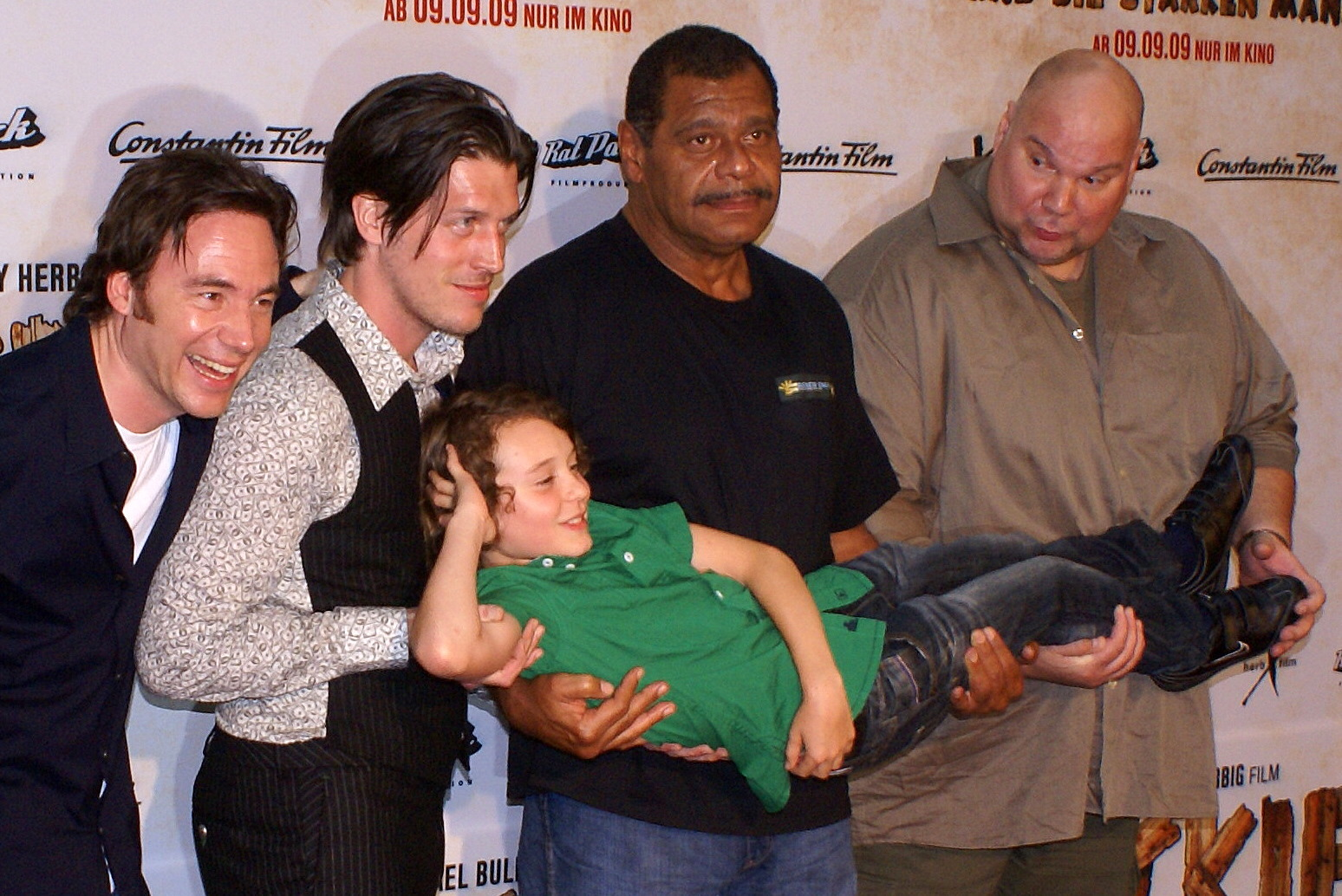
Kaufmann in 2008

== Death of Hartmut Hagen, conviction and exoneration ==
In 2001, Hagen was found dead, apparently suffocated. Kaufmann and von Herrendorf had defrauded Hagen of $500,000, and Kaufmann was accused of murder. In 2002, the death was ruled accidental after Kaufmann, who weighed close to 260 pounds (118 kg) at the time of the incident, confessed that he had fallen on Hagen during a fight. He was sentenced to 15 years in prison for blackmail and robbery in relation to the incident. In 2005, a police investigation revealed that Kaufmann had not committed the crimes, but had confessed in order to protect his dying wife. The investigation also revealed that Hagen was killed by three men likely hired by von Herrendorf, without his knowledge, who had broken into Hagen's home to retrieve incriminating evidence against von Herrendorf.

Kaufmann was released from prison in 2005. He then resumed his acting career, which had been waning around the time of Hagen's death, appearing in supporting roles in films and on television.

== Personal life ==
Kaufmann was married four times and had two children, Eva and Davy. His son Davy (born 1969) is a rock and soul singer, and reached the final of the 2009 version of Germany's Got Talent.

=== Death ===
Kaufmann died on 10 May 2012, aged 64, having suffered a heart attack while out for a walk in Berlin's Grunewald area. A passer-by and paramedics tried to resuscitate him on site for two hours.

== Selected filmography ==
- Baal (1970, TV movie) as Kutscher Orgauer
- Gods of the Plague (1970) as Günther, 'Gorilla'
- The Coffee Shop (1970, TV movie) as Leander
- Why Does Herr R. Run Amok? (1970, uncredited)
- Niklashauser Fart (1970, TV movie) as Leader of the Farmers
- Rio das Mortes (1971, TV movie) as Günther
- Pioneers in Ingolstadt (1971, TV movie) as Max
- Whity (1971) as Whity
- Ludwig: Requiem for a Virgin King (1972) as Graf Holnstein
- Der Sieger von Tambo (1973, TV movie) as Zweiter Freund
- 1 Berlin-Harlem (1974)
- Depression (1975, TV movie)
- Mulligans Rückkehr (1977, TV movie)
- Es muss nicht immer Kaviar sein (1977, TV series) as Ali
- In a Year of 13 Moons (1978) as J. Smolik, Chauffeur
- The Marriage of Maria Braun (1979) as American on train
- Die dritte Generation (The Third Generation, 1979) as Franz Walsch
- Lola (1981) as GI
- Heute spielen wir den Boß (1981)
- Veronika Voss (1982) as G.I. / Dealer
- Kamikaze 1989 (1982) as MK1 Anton
- Querelle (1982) as Nono
- The Roaring Fifties (1983)
- Otto – Der Film (1985) as US-Soldat
- Whopper Punch 777 (1986) as Billy Baxter
- With the Next Man Everything Will Be Different (1989) as Gastwirt
- Römisches Intermezzo (1996, TV movie) as Bodyguard
- Dr. med. Mord (1998, TV series) as Herr Kellway
- Wie stark muß eine Liebe sein (1998, TV movie) as Samuel
- The Tanker (2001, TV movie) as 1. Offizier
- Silent Resident (2007) as Mark
- Leroy (2007) as Leroys Vater
- Ich bin ein Star – Holt mich hier raus! (2009, TV series) as Himself
- Für meine Kinder tu' ich alles (2009, TV movie) as Mammut
- Mord ist mein Geschäft, Liebling (2009) as Salvatore Marino
- Vicky the Viking (2009) as Der schreckliche Sven
- Jerry Cotton (2010) as Agent Joe Brandenburg
- Homies (2011) as DW Court
- Vicky and the Treasure of the Gods (2011) as Der schreckliche Sven
- Turkish for Beginners (2012) as Tongo
- Little Murders (2012) as Josef Gossmann
