= Filmverlag der Autoren =

- Company type: film distribution
- Founded: 1971
- Founder: Hark Bohm
- Headquarters: Berlin, Germany

Filmverlag der Autoren is a German film distributor that was founded in 1971 to help finance and distribute independent films by German Autorenfilm directors, who are renowned for predominantly adapting their own screenplays. Called "The Flagship", many directors of the New German Cinema movement were associated with Filmverlag der Autoren, such as Werner Herzog, Rainer Werner Fassbinder, Wim Wenders, Percy Adlon, and Alexander Kluge, whose films were produced and distributed by the company, and many of whom were members of the Filmverlag board.

== History ==
=== 1970s ===
Efforts to found the Filmverlag had resulted from recurring frustrations the directors had faced in acquiring funding for their politically and aesthetically ambitious films. They had felt that in the established system which was partly commercially oriented, partly stately-funded, the usual means of achieving funding were too limiting, gave them little control over their own work, or just did not allow for issues as challenging as they were having in mind to tackle, so they started the Filmverlag as an independent association to have complete control over their projects, from funding through to pre-production, production, post-production, and distribution. The model which the founders of the Filmverlag were styling their association after was the Verlag der Autoren in Frankfurt, an independent association of stage writers publishing their own works. The first film produced by Filmverlag der Autoren was Furchtlose Flieger by Veith von Fürstenberg and Martin Müller.

Throughout the 1970s, the films put out by the Filmverlag had a high reputation among critics and intellectuals, but the association often bordered bankruptcy. Notable productions of this era included Herzog's Aguirre, the Wrath of God (1972), The Enigma of Kaspar Hauser (1974), Wenders's The Goalkeeper's Fear of the Penalty (1972), Alice in the Cities (1974), Kings of the Road (1976), The American Friend (1977), Fassbinder's The Merchant of Four Seasons (1971), The Bitter Tears of Petra von Kant (1972), Ali: Fear Eats the Soul (1974), Fox and His Friends (1974), Kluge's In Danger and Deep Distress, the Middleway Spells Certain Death (1974), and the collaborative work Germany in Autumn (1977/'78) about German society's reaction to the terrorism of the Red Army Faction and the state's counter-measures during the German Autumn events of 1977.

=== Augstein era ===
The Filmverlag's orientation shifted towards a more mainstream program throughout the 1980s after Der Spiegel-publisher Rudolf Augstein with the help of Bohm had bought himself into the venture in 1977, an event which prompted many of its founding members to leave and start their own production and distribution companies, such as Pro-ject Filmproduktion (started for Kluge's documentary Der Kandidat on Franz-Josef Strauß's 1980 campaign running for German chancellor) and Theo Hinz's Futura-Film (founded in 1983).

While the Filmverlag during Augstein's era scored impressive commercial successes such as Theo Against the Rest of the World (1980, starring Marius Müller-Westernhagen) and Men… (1985), it also began German distribution of less ambitious films such as The Terminator (1984) and Up the creek (1984), and in the eyes of many of its founders its original political and intellectual credibility suffered.

=== After Augstein ===
In 1986, Augstein sold his interests in the Filmverlag to Futura-Film. In 1989, Futura-Film founded the subsidiary distributor Felix-Film with an emphasis upon films from the Soviet Union.

In 1999, all home video distribution rights to the Filmverlag's films and all rights to its label were acquired by Arthaus, a subsidiary of Kinowelt AG. In the following years, Arthaus published many of the Filmverlag films for the first time on VHS and DVD, and in 2009, Arthaus published all Filmverlag films in a large, 50-disc DVD box, half of which had not been published on home video before.

Since the re-organization of Kinowelt in 2003, the original Filmverlag is officially known today as Filmverlag der Autoren und Futura Film GmbH & Co. Verleih Vertriebsgesellschaft KG. It has three subsidiaries:

- Futura Film Weltvertrieb im Filmverlag der Autoren GmbH
- Pro-ject Filmproduktion im Filmverlag der Autoren GmbH
- Felix Film GmbH

== Founding members ==
On April 18, 1971 in Munich, thirteen filmmakers signed the founding papers of Filmverlag der Autoren. They are:

- Hark Bohm
- Michael Fengler
- Peter Lilienthal
- Hans Noever
- Pete Ariel
- Uwe Brandner
- Veith von Fürstenberg
- Florian Furtwängler
- Thomas Schamoni
- Laurens Straub
- Wim Wenders
- Hans W. Geissendörfer
- Volker Vogeler

== Documentary ==
In 2008, Dominik Wessely and Laurens Straub published the 120-minute documentary Gegenschuß - Aufbruch der Filmemacher ("Countershot: Dawn of the filmmakers") on the Filmverlag.
