= Barbara Valentin =

Austrian actress (1940–2002)

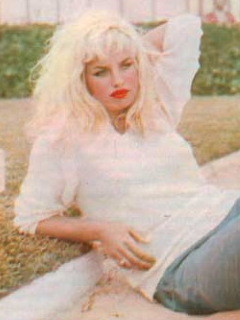
- Valentin, c. 1959
- Born: Ursula Ledersteger; 15 December 1940; Reichsgau Wien, Ostmark (Austria), Nazi Germany
- Died: 22 February 2002 (aged 61); Munich, Germany
- Other name: Barbara Valentine
- Occupation: Actress
- Years active: 1959–2001

Barbara Valentin (born Ursula Ledersteger; 15 December 1940 – 22 February 2002) was an Austrian actress. She worked in film, often with Rainer Werner Fassbinder.

== Biography ==
Valentin was born in 1940 as Ursula Ledersteger in Vienna, Austria (then part of Nazi Germany). Her father was the Austrian art director Hans Ledersteger and her mother the actress Irmgard Alberti. She had a half-brother, Alfred Ledersteger. She was married to German film director Helmut Dietl.

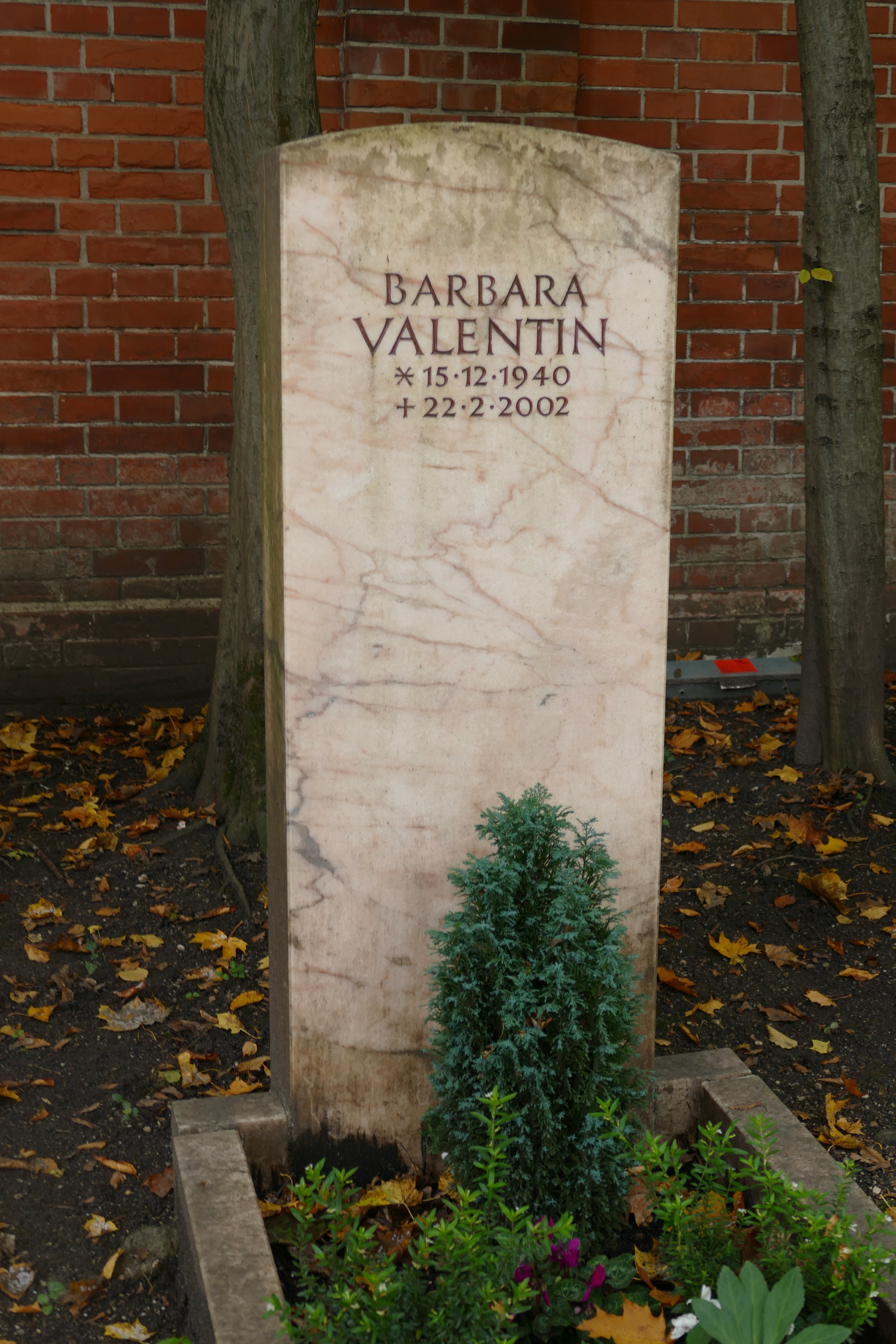
Grave, Ostfriedhof (Munich)

During the early to mid-1980s, Valentin was close friends with Freddie Mercury, who lived with her and her daughter in her Munich apartment for some time. She is featured in the video for the Queen song It's a Hard Life.

During her career, Valentin was nicknamed "the German Jayne Mansfield".

On 22 February 2002, Valentin died of a stroke in Munich at the age of 61. She was buried in the Ostfriedhof in Munich.

== Selected filmography ==
| Year | Title | Role | Director | Notes |
|---|---|---|---|---|
| 1959 | The Head | The hostess and a dancer | Victor Trivas | |
| 1960 | Horrors of Spider Island | Babs | Fritz Böttger | horror film |
| 1961 | The Girl with the Narrow Hips (German: Das Mädchen mit den schmalen Hüften) | Beauty queen | Johannes Kai | |
| 1961 | The Festival Girls | Valentine | Leigh Jason | |
| 1961 | There Is Still Room in Hell (German: In der Hölle ist noch Platz) | Janet | Ernst R. von Theumer | |
| 1965 | Our Man in Jamaica | Gloria | Ernst R. von Theumer | |
| 1966 | Call Girls of Frankfurt | Sonja | Rolf Olsen | |
| 1967 | Carmen, Baby | Dolores | Radley Metzger | |
| 1968 | Der Partyphotograph | Barbara | Hans Dieter Bove | |
| 1968 | The Star Maker | Hotel maid | John Carr | |
| 1970 | Love, Vampire Style | Rosi | Helmut Förnbacher | |
| 1971 | Furchtlose Flieger | Blondie | Veith von Fürstenberg, Martin Müller | |
| 1972 | King, Queen, Knave | Optician | Jerzy Skolimowski | |
| 1973 | World on a Wire (German: Welt am Draht) | Gloria Fromm | Rainer Werner Fassbinder | TV film |
| 1974 | Ali: Fear Eats the Soul (German: Angst essen Seele auf) | Barbara | Rainer Werner Fassbinder | A film about an older German woman who enters an Arab bar where she meets and marries a younger man from Morocco. |
| 1974 | Martha | Marianne | Rainer Werner Fassbinder | TV film |
| 1974 | Effi Briest | Marietta Tripelli | Rainer Werner Fassbinder | |
| 1975 | Fox and His Friends (German: Faustrecht der Freiheit) | Max's wife | Rainer Werner Fassbinder | |
| 1976 | Bomber & Paganini | Mona | Nikos Perakis | |
| 1976 | An Isfahanian in the Land of Hitler | | Nosratollah Vahdat | |
| 1977 | Women in Hospital | Angelika's mother | Rolf Thiele | |
| 1978 | Flaming Hearts | Karola Faber | Walter Bockmayer, Rolf Bührmann | |
| 1980 | Berlin Alexanderplatz | Ida | Rainer Werner Fassbinder | 15½-hour television adaptation of Alfred Döblin's epic 1929 novel |
| 1981 | Lili Marleen | Eva | Rainer Werner Fassbinder | |
| 1981 | Looping | Helma | Walter Bockmayer, Rolf Bührmann | |
| 1984 | Im Himmel ist die Hölle los | Erika Schrillmann | Helmer von Lützelburg | Satirical film |
| 1987 | The Second Victory | Greta Mayer | Gerald Thomas | |
| 2000 | Fassbinder's Women | Herself | Rosa von Praunheim | |
