= Viola Shafik =

Egyptian-German film historian and filmmaker

- ڤيولا شفيق
- Born: July 24, 1961; Schönaich, Baden-Württemberg, Germany
- Education: Academy of Fine Arts, Stuttgart, University of Hamburg
- Occupations: film theorist, film curator, filmmaker
- Years active: 1994 – present

Viola Shafik is an Egyptian-German film theorist, curator, and filmmaker.

== Early life and career ==
Shafik was born in Schönaich, Germany, to an Egyptian father and a German mother. She studied Fine Arts at the Stuttgart Academy of Fine Arts as well as Middle Eastern studies and German literature at the University of Hamburg, finishing with her Ph.D. in 1994. Her dissertation, Arab Cinema: History and Cultural Identity, was published in English in 1998 by American University in Cairo Press.

Shafik lived in New York in 1996 with support by a grant from the Rockefeller Humanities Foundation. Shafik has taught at the American University in Cairo and Zürich University. Further, she also worked as consultant for training initiatives La Biennale di Venezia, the al-Rawi Screenwriters Lab in Jordan, and the Dubai Film Connection. She also has curated film festivals and is member of the board of the World Cinema Fund of the Berlin International Film Festival. Also, Shafik has worked as translator for German television.

In the academic year 2006/07, she was a Fellow at the Berlin Institute for Advanced Study. From 2012 to 2014, she served as Head of Studies for the MENA (Middle East and North Africa region) Programme of Documentary Campus, a German programme focused on directing and producing documentary films in Middle Eastern and North African countries. In 2022, she was a member of the independent jury of Jordanian and Arab filmmakers for the Jordan Film Fund, awarding grants to film and TV projects of Jordanian filmmakers.

== Arab Cinema: History and Cultural Identity ==
Shafik based this 1998 book in English on her Ph.D. thesis, focusing on Arab cinema, both in the Arab world as well as presented in Germany. She discussed the artistic, political, historical and economic aspects of cinema and movie production in the Arab world. It was the first book in English about both the content and the forms of Arab cinema and was revised for a new edition in 2007. A review for Egypt Today magazine called it "a rich, multilayered (albeit academic) study," noting that "the inclusion of films from all over the Arab world is perhaps the book's greatest accomplishment, with large sections covering the often marginalized films of Algeria, Tunisia, and Morocco."

== Films ==
Shafik's 1993 documentary The Lemon Tree reflects the pessimistic mood of the era immediately following the Middle East's Second Gulf War in the early 1990s. Shafik adapted a short story by poet and former Arab League ambassador Ibrahim Shokrallah, which in turn is based on events in his own life. The film won the award for Best Short Documentary at Images of the Arab World Festival 1993.

Her 2011 film Ali im Paradies (My name is not Ali) is a documentary about the actor El Hedi ben Salem, who played the title role in Rainer Werner Fassbinder's Angst essen Seele auf (Ali: Fear eats the soul). For this, she used interviews with Salem's family and material from film archives, showing the actor and director, as well as other artists from the original film. Central themes of this documentary are racism, same-sex relationships and othering in Germany. A review in Variety magazine said it will "intrigue the many arthouse types" still interested in Fassbinder's films and life, but in The Hollywood Reporter, it received a rather negative review.

Shafik's documentary Arij/Scent of Revolution premiered at the 2014 Berlin Film Festival. It features four Egyptian protagonists, a collector of photo negatives, a Coptic political activist, an older socialist writer and a young cyberspace designer, who share their perspective on Egypt's problems, both in relation to earlier and to Egypt's revolution in 2011. The review in Variety criticized an unconvincing connection between the individual parts and quoted Shafik as saying, "This is not the film I wanted to make."

== Selected filmography ==
- The Core of the Pomegranates (Das Innere des Granatapfels), 15 min. experimental film, 1987
- The Lemon Tree (1993)
- Planting of Girls (1999)
- Journey of a Queen (2003)
- My Name is not Ali (Ali im Paradies) 93 min. documentary, 2011
- Scent of Revolution (Arij, 2014)

== Works ==
- Documentary Filmmaking in the Middle East and North Africa. Cairo: American University in Cairo Press; 2022.
- Resisting Pleasure? Political Opposition and the Body in Arab Cinema. In Laachir, Karima; Talajooy, Saeed (2013). Resistance in contemporary Middle Eastern cultures : literature, cinema and music. New York: Routledge. ISBN 978-0-203-08491-5. OCLC 847593919.
- Turkish-German filmmaking: From phobic liminality to transgressive glocality? In Al-Hamarneh, Ala; Thielmann, J., eds. (2008). Islam and Muslims in Germany. Leiden [The Netherlands]: Brill. pp. 329–351. doi:10.1163/ej.9789004158665.I-592.90. ISBN 978-90-474-3000-1.
- Arab Cinema: History and Cultural Identity. [New revised ed.] Cairo: American University in Cairo Press; 2007. ISBN 9781936190577.
- Popular Egyptian Cinema: Gender, Class and Nation, AUC Press, Cairo, 2007
- Prostitute for a Good Reason: Stars and Morality in Egyptian Cinema. In Women's Studies International Forum 24, 6 (2001): 711-725.
- Variety or Unity: Minorities in Egyptian Cinema. In Orient 39, 4 (Dec. 1998): 627-648.

== See also ==
- Arab cinema
