= Harry Baer =

German actor, producer and author (born 1947)

- Born: 27 September 1947 (age 78); Biberach an der Riss, Germany
- Occupation(s): actor, assistant director

Harry Baer (born Harry Zöttl on 27 September 1947) is a German actor, producer and author, best known for his work with director Rainer Werner Fassbinder. He has also been credited as Harry Bär.

== Life ==
Harry Baer began his career in Munich when he joined the Action Theatre, a theatrical experimental group that later regrouped as the Antitheather under the leadership of Rainer Werner Fassbinder. He made his debut in Fassbinder's play Katzelmacher and had his first movie role in Fassbinder's film adaptation. He had starring roles in Gods of the Plague (Götter der Pest) (1970) and Jail Bait (Wildwechsel) (1972), both directed by Fassbinder. During this early period of his career he also had the leading role in director Hans-Jürgen Syberberg's film Ludwig: Requiem for a Virgin King (Ludwig - Requiem für einen jungfräulichen König) (1972), in which he played the title role, King Ludwig II of Bavaria.

In the mid-1970s Harry Baer and Fassbinder had a professional and personal split that lasted until Fassbinder called him back in 1978 to work as his assistant director on The Marriage of Maria Braun (Die Ehe der Maria Braun).

Baer played small roles in many of Fassbinder's movies and was his production manager and assistant director for many films including Fassbinder's last: Querelle (1982). Beyond their professional relationship, Baer was one of the director's closest friends. On the night of Fassbinder's death, Baer was the last person with whom he spoke before his body was found. Baer wrote a book about his life and times with Fassbinder: I can sleep when I'm dead. The breathless life of Rainer Werner Fassbinder (originally Schlafen kann ich, wenn ich tot bin. Das atemlose Leben des Rainer Werner Fassbinder) Kiepenheuer & Witsch, Köln 1990, ISBN 3-462-02055-2.

After Fassbinder's death Baer acted in movies by Mika Kaurismäki, Werner Schroeter, Jeanine Meerapfel, Bernhard Sinkel and Doris Dörrie among others. He has also worked as a production manager on a number of film productions and is a member of the German Film Academy.

== Filmography ==
- 1969: Katzelmacher - Franz
- 1970: Gods of the Plague - Franz Walsch
- 1970: Why Does Herr R. Run Amok? - Kollege im Büro
- 1971: Whity - Davy Nicholson
- 1971: Rio das Mortes
- 1971: Beware of a Holy Whore - Mann der Statistin
- 1972: The Merchant of Four Seasons - 2nd Candidate
- 1972: Ludwig: Requiem for a Virgin King (Ludwig - Requiem für einen jungfräulichen König) - Ludwig II
- 1972: Tonight or Never - Herr
- 1972: Jail Bait (TV Movie) - Franz Bermeier
- 1973: Zahltag
- 1973: Im Zeichen der Kälte (TV Movie)
- 1975: Fox and His Friends - Philip
- 1975: Valley of the Dancing Widows - Bogdan Witkow, Julia's Boyfriend
- 1976: I Only Want You To Love Me
- 1976: Shadow of Angels - Helfritz
- 1976: Mister Scarface - Tony
- 1977: Adolf und Marlene - Luminsky
- 1977: Hitler - ein Film aus Deutschland - Himself
- 1978: Despair – A journey into the Light - Innkeeper (uncredited)
- 1979: Traffic Jam (L'ingorgo - Una storia impossibile) - Mario
- 1979: The Third Generation - Rudolf Mann
- 1980: Palermo oder Wolfsburg - Hausbestzer
- 1980: Berlin Alexanderplatz (TV Mini-Series) - Richard
- 1981: Lili Marleen - Norbert Schultze
- 1981: Lola - 1st demonstrator
- 1981: Heute spielen wir den Boß
- 1982: Veronika Voss - Head waiter (uncredited)
- 1982: The Lite Trap - Fan
- 1983: Der Kleine
- 1983: Bella Donna
- 1983: The Thing at the Door (TV Movie) - Dr. Christoph Vranek
- 1984: Donauwalzer (TV Movie)
- 1984: Im Himmel ist die Hölle los - 'Ossi' Sommer
- 1985: In the Belly of the Whale - Hartmann
- 1985: Westler - Border Guard
- 1986: Osveta - Harald Kurcijus
- 1987: Warten auf Marie - Konrad
- 1987: Helsinki Napoli All Night Long - Man #1
- 1988: The Passenger – Welcome to Germany - Grenzbeamter
- 1988: The Venus Trap
- 1988: The Girlfriend - Raquel's friend in Berlin
- 1989: Fool's Mate
- 1990: Das einfache Glück - Bulle
- 1991: Superstau - Neighbour
- 1992: The True Story About Men and Women
- 1993: Prinz in Hölleland - Ingolf
- 1993: Der Kinoerzähler - Herr Kunze
- 1995: Toms Zimmer - Lottobudenbesitzer
- 1996: Babuschka (TV Movie)
- 1997: Frost - Mann, der Obdach gewährt
- 2002: Führer Ex - Friedhelm Kaltenbach
- 2003: Raid - Mark Hollander
- 2003: Skifahren unter Wasser (Short) - Albert
- 2005: Max und Moritz Reloaded - Bayer
- 2006: Montag kommen die Fenster - Herr Zander
- 2007: The Cursed Treasure (TV Movie) - Klaus Schulte
- 2008: Berlin by the Sea - Daniel Finkelsturm
- 2009: Zwischen heute und morgen - Verleger
- 2010: Lys - Wachmann
- 2013: Wetlands - Neuer Freund
- 2013: Harder und die Göre - Hauptkommissar Bartholomäus Harder
- 2014: Coming In - Martin
- 2016: Frauen - Chauffeur
- 2016: S & M: Les Sadiques - Uncle Franz
- 2017: Bruma - Wim Maller
- 2019: Gasmann - Gerichtsvollzieher
- 2020: vEmotion - Denny Binera

== Bibliography ==
- Lorenz, Juliane (ed.) Chaos as Usual: Conversations About Rainer Werner Fassbinder , Sutton Publishing, 2004, ISBN 1-55783-262-5
