= Peter Kern (actor) =

Austrian actor (1949–2015)

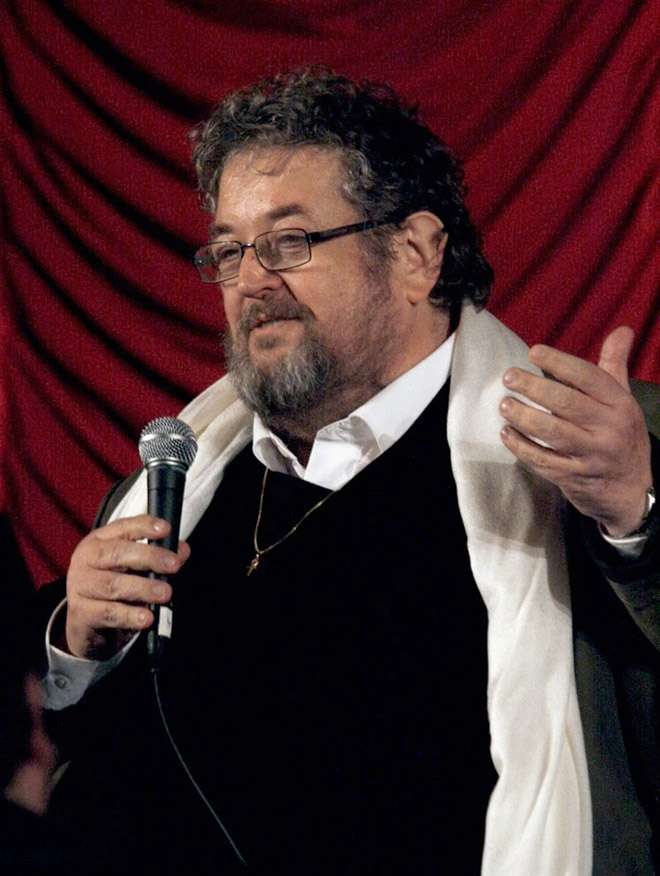
- Kern at the 2009 Vienna International Film Festival
- Born: 13 February 1949; Vienna, Austria
- Died: 26 August 2015 (aged 66); Vienna, Austria
- Occupations: Actor; film director; screenwriter; film producer
- Years active: 1957–2015

Peter Kern (13 February 1949 – 26 August 2015) was an Austrian actor, film director, screenwriter, and producer. He appeared in more than 70 films and directed a further 25. He starred in the 1978 film Flaming Hearts, which was entered into the 28th Berlin International Film Festival. In 1980, he was a member of the jury at the 30th Berlin International Film Festival.

In his documentaries, he has addressed his homosexuality and his weight issues on several occasions. Two of Kern's later films, Blutsfreundschaft (2008) and Mörderschwestern (2011), featured Helmut Berger in a starring role. His last film was The Last Summer of the Rich ("Der letzte Sommer der Reichen"), which screened at the Berlin Film Festival in 2015.

== Selected filmography ==
- Ludwig: Requiem for a Virgin King (dir. Hans-Jürgen Syberberg, 1972), as Lakai Mayr, court barber Hoppe, and Röhm
- Tonight or Never (dir. Daniel Schmid, 1972), as Actor
- Adele Spitzeder (dir. Peer Raben, 1972, TV film), as Innkeeper
- Schattenreiter (dir. George Moorse, 1974), as Tony
- La Paloma (dir. Daniel Schmid, 1974), as Count Isidor Palewski
- The Wrong Move (dir. Wim Wenders, 1975), as Bernhard Landau
- Fox and His Friends (dir. Rainer Werner Fassbinder, 1975), as Fatty Schmidt, flower salesman
- Mother Küsters' Trip to Heaven (dir. Rainer Werner Fassbinder, 1975), as Night club owner
- The Sternstein Manor (dir. Hans W. Geißendörfer, 1976), as Toni Stadlhofer
- The Wild Duck (dir. Hans W. Geißendörfer, 1976), as Hjalmar Ekdal
- Group Portrait with a Lady (dir. Aleksandar Petrović, 1977), as Werner Hoyser
- Kleinhoff Hotel (dir. Carlo Lizzani, 1977), as Erich Müller
- Hitler: A Film from Germany (dir. Hans-Jürgen Syberberg, 1977), as Murderer from "M", Puppeteer, Mr. Ellerkamp, SS-Man, and Director of tourism
- Flaming Hearts (dir. Walter Bockmayer, 1978), as Peter Huber
- Despair (dir. Rainer Werner Fassbinder, 1978), as Müller
- Bella Donna (dir. Peter Keglevic, 1983)
- The Roaring Fifties (dir. Peter Zadek, 1983), as Franz Arnusch
- Joan of Arc of Mongolia (dir. Ulrike Ottinger, 1989), as Mickey Katz
- Malina (dir. Werner Schroeter, 1991), as Bulgarian
- Terror 2000: Germany Out of Control (dir. Christoph Schlingensief, 1992), as Körn
- The Last Summer of the Rich (2015, director)
