= Trudeliese Schmidt =

German opera singer

- Born: 7 November 1934; Saarbrücken, Territory of the Saar Basin
- Died: 24 June 2004 (aged 69); Saarbrücken, Germany
- Occupation: Operatic mezzo-soprano
- Organizations: Deutsche Oper am Rhein; Salzburg Festival
- Relatives: Ingrid Caven (sister)

Trudeliese Schmidt (7 November 1934 − 24 June 2004) was a German operatic mezzo-soprano who had an international career, performing at major opera houses and festivals in Europe. The singer with a remarkable stage presence excelled in trouser roles such as Cherubino, Idamante, Hänsel, Octavian and the composer in Ariadne auf Naxos. She performed in premieres of operas by Isang Yun and Manfred Trojahn.

== Life and career ==
Born in Saarbrücken on 7 November 1934, Schmidt studied voice and made her debut at the Saarbrücken Opera as Hänsel in Humperdinck's Hänsel und Gretel. She became a member of the Hessisches Staatstheater Wiesbaden and in 1969 of the Deutsche Oper am Rhein. The same year, she performed at the Staatstheater Nürnberg in the premiere of Isang Yun's opera Träume (Dreams). She toured Japan with the Bayerische Staatsoper in 1974.

Schmidt performed at the Bayreuth Festival from 1975, as Wellgunde in Das Rheingold and Götterdämmerung, later also as Grimgerde in Die Walküre and in smaller roles in Parsifal. She appeared at the Salzburg Festival from 1974 to 1995, in roles such as the Zweite Dame in Mozart's Die Zauberflöte, the composer in Ariadne auf Naxos by Richard Strauss (1979–82), Clairon in his Capriccio (1985–87), Cherubino in Mozart's Le nozze di Figaro (1980), Idamante in his Idomeneo (1983–84), Meg Page in Verdi's Falstaff (1991) and Marcellina in Le nozze di Figaro (1995).

Schmidt's stage presence was praised, in roles such as the Kostelnička in Janáček Jenůfa and Carlotta in Schreker's Die Gezeichneten. She performed the role of the Marchesa in the premiere of Manfred Trojahn's Enrico at the Schwetzingen Festival in 1991.

In concert, Schmidt appeared in 1985 as a soloist in a mass at St. Peter's Basilica held by Pope John Paul II, singing the alto part in Mozart's Coronation Mass, conducted by Herbert von Karajan. She performed in Beethoven's Missa solemnis with the Berlin Philharmonic conducted by Karajan, alongside Lella Cuberli, Vinson Cole and José van Dam.

Schmidt died in Saarbrücken.

== Bibliography ==
- Karl J. Kutsch and Leo Riemens: Großes Sängerlexikon. Dritte, erweiterte Auflage. Saur, Munich 1999. Volume 4: Moffo–Seidel, ISBN 978-3-598-11419-9, S. 3120/3121.
- Kurt Malisch (2007). "Schmidt, Trudeliese". Neue Deutsche Biographie (in German). Vol. 23. Berlin: Duncker & Humblot. pp. 216–217. (full text online).
