= The Festival Girls =

1961 film

- Directed by: Leigh Jason
- Written by: Royal Foster; Ralph Staub
- Starring: Barbara Valentin; Alexander D'Arcy; Scilla Gabel
- Cinematography: Erich Küchler
- Music by: Borut Lesjak
- Production company: United American Film Production Corporation
- Distributed by: Olympic International Films
- Release dates: July 1, 1961 (West Germany); November 22, 1962 (US)
- Running time: 76 minutes
- Country: United States
- Language: English

The Festival Girls is a 1961 American drama film directed by Leigh Jason and starring Barbara Valentin, Alexander D'Arcy and Scilla Gabel. It was one of a number of low-budget exploitation films Austrian star Valentin appeared in during the early 1960s. Location shooting took place at several European film festivals. It premiered in West Germany in 1961, and first screened in the United States the following year. It had censorship issues in several American cities.

== Synopsis ==
Larry Worthington, a down-on-his-luck film producer, discovers Valentine a young model who is rescued half-drowned from the sea outside his European hotel. He casts her in his latest film, which then wins top honours at the Venice Film Festival only to provoke the anger of Nadja.

== Cast ==
- Barbara Valentin as Valentine
- Alexander D'Arcy as Larry Worthington
- Scilla Gabel as Nadja
- Alain Dijon as Dirk Vangard
- Eduard Linkers as Jerome
- Regina Seiffert as Liz
- Janez Cuk as Hotel Manager
- Franek Trefalt as George
- Demeter Bitenc as Member of Jury
- Ute Böhnig as Starlet
- Anita Semmler as Starlet
- Helga Liotta as Starlet

== Bibliography ==
- Reimer, Robert; Reimer, Carol (2010). The A to Z of German Cinema. Scarecrow Press. ISBN 978-1-4617-3186-3.
