= Three Faces of Sin =

1961 French-Italian film directed by François Villiers

- Le Puits aux trois vérités
- Directed by: François Villiers
- Screenplay by: Rémo Forlani
- Based on: Le Puits aux trois vérités by Jean-Jacques Gautier
- Starring: Michèle Morgan; Jean-Claude Brialy; Catherine Spaak; Scilla Gabel
- Cinematography: Jacques Robin
- Edited by: Christian Gaudin
- Music by: Maurice Jarre
- Production companies: Les Films Caravelle; Gaumont
- Distributed by: Gaumont (France)
- Release date: 1961
- Running time: 97 minutes
- Countries: France; Italy
- Language: French

Three Faces of Sin (French: Le Puits aux trois vérités) is a 1961 French-Italian film directed by François Villiers, based on the novel Le Puits aux trois vérités by Jean-Jacques Gautier. The film stars Michèle Morgan, Jean-Claude Brialy, Catherine Spaak and Scilla Gabel. Maurice Jarre composed the score. Gaumont lists the film’s running time as 97 minutes.

== Plot ==
Danièle is found dead in her home after a gunshot is heard. The police attempt to establish what happened by comparing the young woman’s diary with statements from her mother, while Danièle’s husband gives his own version of events to his mistress. The same events take on different meanings depending on who is recounting them, leading investigators to weigh competing accounts of the case.

== Cast ==
- Michèle Morgan as Renée Plèges
- Jean-Claude Brialy as Laurent Lénaud
- Catherine Spaak as Danièle Lénaud
- Scilla Gabel as Rossana
- Michel Etcheverry as Commissaire Bertrand
- Franco Fabrizi as Philippe Guerbois

== Production ==
The film was produced by Les Films Caravelle and Gaumont. François Villiers was the director; Rémo Forlani was the screenwriter; Jacques Robin was the cinematographer; Christian Gaudin was the chief editor; and Maurice Jarre was the chief composer.

== Release ==
L'Officiel des spectacles lists the film’s French release date as 13 September 1961. Unifrance lists the French release date as 13 October 1961 and records the film’s production year as 1961.
