= Scilla Gabel =

Italian actress (born 1938)

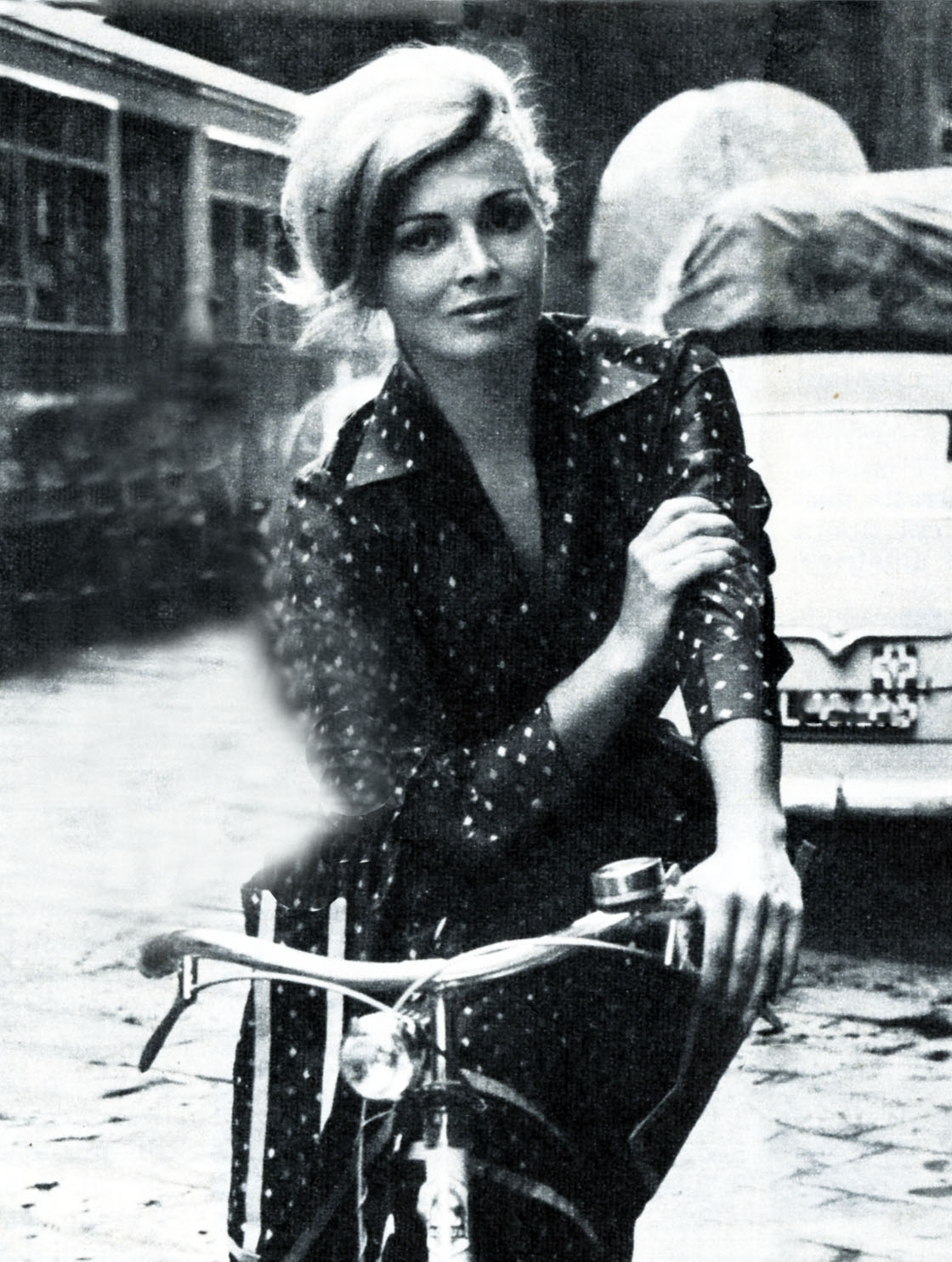
- Gabel in 1959
- Born: Gianfranca Gabellini; 4 January 1938 (age 88); Rimini, Kingdom of Italy
- Occupation: Actress
- Years active: 1954–1988
- Spouse: Piero Schivazappa (m. 1968; died 2017)
- Children: 1

Scilla Gabel (born Gianfranca Gabellini; 4 January 1938) is an Italian film, television, and stage actress. She appeared in 50 films and multiple television programs between 1954 and 1988.

== Career ==
Born in Rimini as one of five children, Gabel entered the cinema industry as Sophia Loren's body double. Between 1957 and 1967, she appeared often as the female lead actress in dozens of films but failed to emerge because of the stereotyped roles. Starting from late 1960s, she focused her activity on stage and television, in which she found most significant roles and critical appreciation.

== Personal life ==
Gabel married Piero Schivazappa in 1968; they had one child.

=== Father's murder ===
On 8 May 1999, Gabel's 87 year-old father Giuseppe Gabellini was murdered. He was landlord to a number of tenants at his villa on the via Campi di Torre Flavia two blocks from Ladispoli's beach, about 35 km west of Rome. One tenant, 65 year old Elisa Santilli owed Gabellini Lit. 900,000 ($785 in 2022) for several months rent, which she refused to pay. Santilli had also refused a Lit. 3,000,000 ($2,820 in 2022) buyout from Gabellini to leave the apartment voluntarily.

At 10:15 on the morning of Friday, 8 May Gabellini returned to via Campi di Torre Flavi to reason with Santilli one last time before informing her that he had scheduled her eviction by carabiniere for 25 May. After a brief argument at the threshold, during which she accepted the buyout, Santilli returned to her kitchen where she retrieved a large kitchen knife. She sprang at the elderly man and stabbed him in the chest without a word. After Gabellini fell to the floor of the corridor she pounced on his stricken body. There she stabbed him fourteen more times, stopping only after she broke off the tip of her knife in one of her landlord's vertebrae. She then stood back, apparently to watch Gabellini die.

Gabel's father died at the scene in his daughter's arms. Santilli moved out of the apartment one week later, after being placed on house arrest awaiting trial. She moved 70 km northwest, to Pescia Romana.

== Partial filmography ==
- Tua per la vita (1955) - La sartina dell' Atelier
- Due sosia in allegria (1956)
- Gente felice (1957) - Gina
- Girls of the Night (1958) - Lola
- Legs of Gold (1958) - Gianna
- The White Warrior (1959) - Princess Maria Vorontsova
- Tarzan's Greatest Adventure (1959) - Toni
- Les canailles (1960) - Gina
- Genitori in blue-jeans (1960) - Colette
- Tough Guys (1960) - Josette
- Call Girls of Rome (1960) - Patrizia
- Queen of the Pirates (1960) - Isabella, the Duke's Daughter
- Mill of the Stone Women (1960) - Elfie Wahl
- La grande vallata (1961)
- Les filles sèment le vent (1961) - Kissa
- The Festival Girls (1961) - Nadja
- Mara (1961)
- Three Faces of Sin (1961) - Rossana Stromboli
- Romulus and the Sabines (1961) - Dusia
- Village of Daughters (1962) - Angelina Vimercati
- No Man's Land (1962) - Woman
- Colossus of the Arena (1962) - Thalima
- Sodom and Gomorrah (1962) - Tamar
- La salamandre d'or (1962) - Béatrice
- The Two Colonels (1963) - Iride
- Knights of Terror (1963) - Cristina
- I diavoli di Spartivento (1963)
- Outlaws of Love (1963) - Wilma
- Seven Slaves Against the World (1964) - Claudia
- Corpse for the Lady (1964) - Renata
- La vendetta di Spartacus (1964) - Cinzia
- Una storia di notte (1964) - A German tourist
- Il figlio di Cleopatra (1964) - Livia
- Con rispetto parlando (1965)
- Modesty Blaise (1966) - Melina
- Djurado (1966) - Barbara Donovan
- Target for Killing (1966) - La Tigra
- How to Seduce a Playboy (1966) - Anita Bionda
- Zärtliche Haie (1967) - Zeezee
- The Great Happiness (1967) - Molly Pink
- Bastard, Go and Kill (1971) - Susanna
