= Gods of the Plague =

1970 West German film by Rainer Werner Fassbinder

- Theatrical release poster
- Directed by: Rainer Werner Fassbinder
- Written by: Rainer Werner Fassbinder
- Produced by: Rainer Werner Fassbinder; Michael Fengler; Peer Raben
- Cinematography: Dietrich Lohmann
- Edited by: Rainer Werner Fassbinder; Thea Eymèsz
- Music by: Peer Raben
- Production company: Antiteater-X-Film GmbH
- Distributed by: Basis-Film-Verleih GmbH
- Release date: 4 April 1970 (Vienna International Film Festival)
- Running time: 92 minutes
- Country: West Germany
- Language: German
- Budget: DM 180,000

Gods of the Plague (German: Götter der Pest) is a 1970 West German black-and-white drama film directed by Rainer Werner Fassbinder.

== Plot ==
After his release from prison, ex-convict Franz Walsch finds his way back into the Munich criminal underworld. His attentions become focused upon two women, Joanna and Margarethe, as well as upon Günther, his friend who earlier shot his brother.

== Cast ==
- Hanna Schygulla as Joanna Reiher
- Margarethe von Trotta as Margarethe
- Harry Baer as Franz Walsch
- Günther Kaufmann as Günther
- Carla Egerer as Carla (as Carla Aulaulu)
- Ingrid Caven as Magdalena Fuller
- Jan George as Policeman
- Marian Seidowsky as Marian Walsch
- Yaak Karsunke as Inspector
- Micha Cochina as Joe
- Hannes Gromball as Supermarket Manager
- Lilith Ungerer as Girl
- Katrin Schaake as Café Owner
- Lilo Pempeit as Mother
- Rainer Werner Fassbinder as Pornography Customer
- David Morgan as Catcher
- Thomas Schieder as Tommy
- Kurt Raab as Pub Guest
- Irm Hermann as Bartender
- Peter Moland
- Doris Mattes as Marie Luise
- Eva Madelung as Girl
- Ursula Strätz as Antique Shop Owner

== Production ==
The film was shot in Munich and Dingolfing during five weeks in October and November 1969 with Fassbinder eventually coming to consider it, shortly before he died, as the fifth-best feature film he made during his entire career.

== Analysis ==
Kaja Silverman, author of the scholarly article "Fassbinder and Lacan: A Reconsideration of Gaze, Look, and Image," wrote that the film "holds subject and ideal image at the most extreme distance from each other and that, hence, attests most eloquently to the latter's recalcitrant exteriority." She further wrote that the character of Margarethe "sustains her identity through constant reference to an external representation." Commenting on the scene in which she sees herself in a poster of a face of a blonde woman, Silverman stated that it is "presumably a blown-up advertisement." It has also been noted that the film is replete with homoerotic symbolism.

== Release ==
The film was released on DVD by The Criterion Collection in 2013 through its Eclipse series as part of a box set together with Love Is Colder Than Death, Katzelmacher, The American Soldier and Beware of a Holy Whore.

== Reception ==
The film's ensemble cast and camera work won the Deutscher Filmpreis (Filmband in Gold) in 1970. PopMatters' opinion of the film was that it "prov[es] the director’s expressive mastery," critic Michael Koresky opined that the film "ultimately illustrates the futility of romance and the inevitability and ignominy of death," while another critic, Noel Murray, wrote that the film explores its "milieux in remarkable ways, with memorable moments" and a "casualness about nudity and scatology that outpaces even the American underground cinema of the era." Similarly, Slant Magazine critic Jordan Cronk wrote that Fassbinder's "technical prowess shows greater advancement" with this film, "parlaying minimalism into a more dreary dramaturgy".

Steve Erickson underscored the fact that "there's something compelling about the film's experimentation, even if Fassbinder’s skills weren't all quite there yet. For one thing, Gods of the Plague takes a narrative that purportedly revolves around a heterosexual love triangle and turns it in a homoerotic direction, offering up nudity from both Baer and Kaufmann, the latter of whom the director was infatuated with at the time. That's a twist on the film noir rarely seen even today," and Rebecca A. Brown noted that the film is one of "Fassbinder’s most visually stunning early films [in which the] camera lushly juxtaposes intense darks, greys, and whites in every scene. Centered images of the actors and well-decorated interiors abound, as well, disorienting the familiarity of the narrative and Baer’s purposely listless performance." Furthermore, IndieWire has referred to the film as "sensually composed," critic Fernando F. Croce opined that the film's "dialogue is musical in its terseness," critic Dennis Schwartz has called it a "fairly good watch," and TV Guide wrote that it is a "memorable crime flick." The New York Times critic Vincent Canby wrote that "it's impeccably performed by members of the Fassbinder stock company," and London's Time Out praised the film as "a witty, stylish meditation on the genre, filtered through the decidedly dark and morbid sensibility of its director."

== Bibliography ==
- Silverman, Kaja. "Fassbinder and Lacan: A Reconsideration of Gaze, Look, and Image." In: Bryson, Norman, Michael Ann Holly, and Keith Moxey (editors). Visual Culture: Images and Interpretations. Wesleyan University Press, 2013, p. 272ff. ISBN 0819574236, 9780819574237.
