= El Hedi ben Salem =

Moroccan actor (1935–1976)

- Born: El Hedi ben Salem m'Barek Mohammed Mustafa c. 1935; Morocco
- Died: 1977 (aged 43-44); Nîmes, France
- Other names: Salem El Hedi; Salem El Heïdi; El Hedi Ben Salem; Elhedi Ben Salem
- Years active: 1971–1975
- Children: 5

El Hedi ben Salem (Arabic: الهادي بن سالم; c. 1935 – 1977) was a Moroccan actor, best known for his work with film director Rainer Werner Fassbinder.

== Early life ==
Salem was born El Hedi ben Salem m'Barek Mohammed Mustafa in a small village in Morocco to a Hartani family. At the age of 15, he married a 13-year-old girl. He and his wife eventually had five children and settled in a town near the Atlas Mountains. By the early 1970s, Salem had left his wife and children and moved to Europe.

== Career ==
In early 1971, Salem met German film director Rainer Werner Fassbinder at a gay bathhouse in Paris, and the two began a romantic relationship. He moved to West Germany with Fassbinder and became a part of the director's entourage. He played several minor roles in Fassbinder's films. Fassbinder eventually cast Salem in the lead role in Ali: Fear Eats the Soul (1974), a film that explores xenophobia in post-World War II Germany. In the film, Salem portrays a Moroccan immigrant living in West Germany who begins a relationship with an older German woman whom he eventually marries. The film brought Fassbinder worldwide critical acclaim and became Salem's best known role. Throughout the mid-1970s, Salem continued to appear in Fassbinder's films in supporting roles. His final onscreen role was in Fassbinder's romantic drama Fox and His Friends in 1975.

== Relationship with Fassbinder ==
Salem and Fassbinder's relationship was reportedly tumultuous. They fought frequently due in part to Salem's short temper, which turned violent when he drank. While Salem and Fassbinder were living together in Germany, Fassbinder convinced Salem to bring his two teenaged sons, who lived in Morocco with Salem's estranged wife, to live with them. Against their mother's wishes, Salem brought the boys to West Germany.

The arrangement did not last long as the boys were unprepared for life in a different culture, and they were frequently subjected to racism. While Fassbinder considered the boys his own, neither he nor Salem was up to the task of raising children. Both frequently drank, took drugs and often left the boys with various friends. One of Salem's sons returned to his mother in Morocco, and the other went to different homes and finally a reformatory.

In 1974, Fassbinder ended the relationship due to Salem's violence and drinking. After the breakup, Salem's alcoholism worsened. Director Daniel Schmid, one of Fassbinder's close friends, later told film critic Roger Ebert that shortly after the break up, Salem got drunk and "went to a place in Berlin and stabbed three people." Salem then returned to Fassbinder and told him "You don't have to be afraid anymore."

== Death ==
After the stabbings, none of which were fatal, Salem fled to France aided by Fassbinder and his friends. Schmid later recalled that Salem had to be "virtually smuggled out of Germany" and that Fassbinder cried the entire time they were driving Salem out of Berlin.

In France, Salem was arrested and jailed. While in custody at a prison in Nîmes in 1977, Salem hanged himself. News of Salem's death was kept from Fassbinder for years. He did not learn of his former lover's death until shortly before his own death in 1982. Fassbinder dedicated Querelle (1982), his last film, to Salem.

== In popular culture ==
In 2012, a documentary on Salem's life titled My Name Is Not Ali, premiered at the Montreal World Film Festival. The film was directed by German filmmaker Viola Shafik.

== Filmography ==
Year	Title	Role	Notes
1971	The Merchant of Four Seasons	The Arab	credited as Salem El Heïdi; German title: Händler der vier Jahreszeiten
1972	The Bitter Tears of Petra von Kant	–	props credited as Salem El Hedi; German title: Die bitteren Tränen der Petra von Kant
1972	Jail Bait	Franz's friend	television movie German title: Wildwechsel
1973	Eight Hours Don't Make a Day	Arbeitskollege	miniseries German title: Acht Stunden sind kein Tag
1973	Tenderness of Wolves	Französischer Soldat	set decorator and props German title: Die Zärtlichkeit der Wölfe
1973	World on a Wire	Castro	miniseries German title: Welt am Draht
1974	Ali: Fear Eats the Soul	Ali	German title: Angst essen Seele auf
1974	Martha	Hotel guest	television movie
1975	Like a Bird on a Wire	Bodybuilder	German title: Wie ein Vogel auf dem Draht
1975	Fox and His Friends	Salem the Moroccan	uncredited German title: Faustrecht der Freiheit
