= Traffic Jam (film) =

1979 film by Luigi Comencini

- Film poster
- Directed by: Luigi Comencini
- Written by: Luigi Comencini; Ruggero Maccari; Bernardino Zapponi
- Based on: L'Autoroute du sud by Julio Cortázar (uncredited)
- Produced by: Anna Maria Clementelli; Silvio Clementelli; Michael Fengler
- Starring: Alberto Sordi; Annie Girardot; Fernando Rey; Patrick Dewaere; Ángela Molina; Harry Baer; Marcello Mastroianni; Stefania Sandrelli; Ugo Tognazzi; Miou-Miou; Gérard Depardieu
- Cinematography: Ennio Guarnieri
- Edited by: Nino Baragli
- Music by: Fiorenzo Carpi
- Distributed by: Titanus
- Release date: 12 January 1979
- Running time: 121 minutes
- Country: Italy
- Language: Italian

Traffic Jam (Italian: L'ingorgo - Una storia impossibile) is a 1979 Italian satirical comedy-drama film directed by Luigi Comencini. It was entered into the 1979 Cannes Film Festival. The film, although uncredited, is based on the 1966 short story "L'Autoroute du sud" by Julio Cortázar.

== Plot ==
In a main thoroughfare on the outskirts of Rome, thousands of motorists are stuck in terrible traffic jam for twenty-four hours. In a stretch of road there is a variety of characters whose behaviour becomes strange. There is a selfish and hypocritical entrepreneur in a luxury car; a young hippie girl harassed and then raped by some dandies and a family from Naples on the way to Rome to abort their daughter.

The day the traffic jam clears, the entrepreneur hires the girl from Naples for a record company in exchange for a sexual service. The girl is raped and then comforted by a man who wants to avenge her but then gives up. The rapists leave quietly once more.

== Cast ==
- Annie Girardot as Irene
- Fernando Rey as Carlo
- Miou-Miou as Angela
- Gérard Depardieu as Franco
- Ugo Tognazzi as Professor
- Marcello Mastroianni as Marco Montefoschi
- Stefania Sandrelli as Teresa
- Alberto Sordi as De Benedetti
- Orazio Orlando as Ferreri
- Gianni Cavina as Pompeo
- Harry Baer as Mario
- Ángela Molina as Martina
- Ciccio Ingrassia as The Dying Man
- Patrick Dewaere as Young man
- José Sacristán as The Priest
