= Querelle of Brest =

1945 novel by Jean Genet

- First edition
- Author: Jean Genet
- Original title: Querelle de Brest
- Translator: Anselm Hollo
- Language: French
- Publisher: Marc Barbezat - L'Arbalete (Original French), Grove Press (English Translation)
- Publication date: 1947
- Publication place: France
- English publication date: 1974
- Media type: Print
- Pages: 276

Querelle of Brest (French: Querelle de Brest) is a novel by the French writer Jean Genet. It was written mostly in 1945 and first published anonymously in 1947, limited to 460 numbered copies, with illustrations by Jean Cocteau. It is set in the midst of the port town of Brest, where sailors and the sea are associated with murder. Georges Querelle, its protagonist and antihero, is a bisexual thief, prostitute and serial killer who manipulates and kills his lovers for thrills and profit. The novel formed the basis for Querelle (1982), Rainer Werner Fassbinder's last film.

== Story ==
Georges "Jo" Querelle is a sailor on the cargo ship Le Vengeur. Querelle is also a thief, prostitute, opium smuggler, and serial killer. While he ostensibly kills for money, his primary motive for murder is the sheer, liberating pleasure he experiences from it; he kills to feel alive.

He runs his smuggling racket out of Le Vengeur, enlisting Vic, one of his shipmates, as his accomplice. One night, when the ship is docked in the French port town of Brest, Querelle slits Vic's throat. The ship is delayed at the port as the police investigate, led by Mario, a predatory police captain who extorts sexual favors from the men he investigates before putting them in jail.

Desperate for a scapegoat, Querelle befriends Gilbert "Gil" Turko, a young man fleeing arrest for the murder of a man who propositioned him, with the intention of framing him for Vic's murder. Much to his surprise, he finds in Gil a kindred spirit whom he wants to "teach," both in sex and in the "art" of murder. He enlists Gil to help in mugging Seblon, confident that the lieutenant's infatuation with him will prevent him from going to the police.

Querelle sleeps with Mario in an attempt to get him to back away from arresting him or Gil, but the captain is unmoved from turning him into yet another of his jailed conquests. Seeing no alternative, Querelle betrays Gil to Mario, adding to Gil's already dire situation, the blame for a murder he didn't commit.

At the end of the novel, Querelle seduces Seblon, only to turn him over to the police the next day. He leaves Brest the same day when Le Vengeur sets sail.

== Sexuality ==
While most of Querelle's sexual partners are men, he is more aroused by power than by people. Genet writes that Querelle views sex as an act of either domination or submission, and so treats his partners as objects that exist for the sole purpose of enacting his sadomasochistic fantasies of power and punishment.

He has at least a passing interest in women; in one of the novel's main conflicts, he competes with his brother Robert for Madame Lysiane, Robert's mistress and the proprietess of a brothel they both visit. Even then, Querelle's pursuit of her is completely self-serving, a ploy to get the best of his brother.

His mysterious, brooding persona and sexual ambiguity make him an object of fascination and attraction to everyone in his orbit, especially Madame Lysiane and Lieutenant Seblon, his closeted superior officer. While not completely understanding who or what he is, the people in his life find themselves inescapably drawn to him, often at their own peril.

== Legacy ==
Canadian writer Kevin Lambert's 2018 novel Querelle of Roberval was partially based on Querelle of Brest. Querelle was portrayed by Brad Davis in Rainer Werner Fassbinder's 1982 film adaptation of the novel. Genet, in discussion with Schidor, said that he had not seen the film, commenting "You can't smoke at the movies."
