= Ludwig: Requiem for a Virgin King =

- Directed by: Hans-Jürgen Syberberg
- Written by: Hans-Jürgen Syberberg
- Produced by: Hans Jürgen Syberberg
- Starring: Harry Baer
- Cinematography: Dietrich Lohmann
- Edited by: Peter Przygodda
- Production company: TMS Film GmbH
- Distributed by: American Zoetrope (US Distribution)
- Release date: 23 June 1972
- Running time: 140 minutes
- Country: West Germany
- Language: German

Ludwig: Requiem for a Virgin King (German: Ludwig – Requiem für einen jungfräulichen König) is a 1972 West German historical drama film directed by Hans-Jürgen Syberberg, starring Harry Baer as Ludwig II of Bavaria. The film was shot on a soundstage with rear-projected scenography and an intentionally artificial style.

The film received the German Film Award for Best Fiction Film and Best Screenplay. It is the first part in Syberberg's "German trilogy" and was followed by Karl May in 1974 and Hitler: A Film from Germany in 1977.

== Plot ==
Three norns introduce Ludwig as suffering from a curse, given to him by Lola Montez, which will make him the last king of Bavaria. The king organises his court according to infatuations and aesthetical preferences. He is opposed to industrialism, progressivism and the emerging modern mass society. He complains about his aching teeth and behaves eccentrically, but interacts with ordinary people to stay in contact with life outside the court. Early in his life he began to protect and finance the then unknown Richard Wagner, who greatly appreciates the support, but others see this as scandalous. Elisabeth of Austria sympathises with the king, who is her cousin, and compares him to Sitting Bull. A group of ministers led by Ludwig's uncle Luitpold plot to assassinate the king so they can industrialise the country.

A couple perform a Bavarian folk dance, Wagner discusses his future, and Ernst Röhm and Adolf Hitler dance rhumba. Ludwig gives in to Otto von Bismarck and allows Bavaria to be annexed into the German Empire. The conspirators discuss how to get rid of Ludwig but worry that the Bavarian monarchy itself might be in danger. A man of the people strongly opposes the plan to kill Ludwig. Ludwig's financial debts are held against him and the press describes him as insane. He admits that his struggle against the progressives has failed but that others soon will follow him. The king is found drowned in an assumed suicide. Ludwig's brother Otto becomes the new king, but Luitpold rules as Prince Regent due to Otto's mental illness. It is discovered that Ludwig's debts were smaller than assumed.

Ludwig is taken to a guillotine and beheaded. A peasant woman promises that he will return, just like the savior. Surrounded by men with motorcycles, Ludwig stands on the guillotine and begins yodeling.

== Cast ==
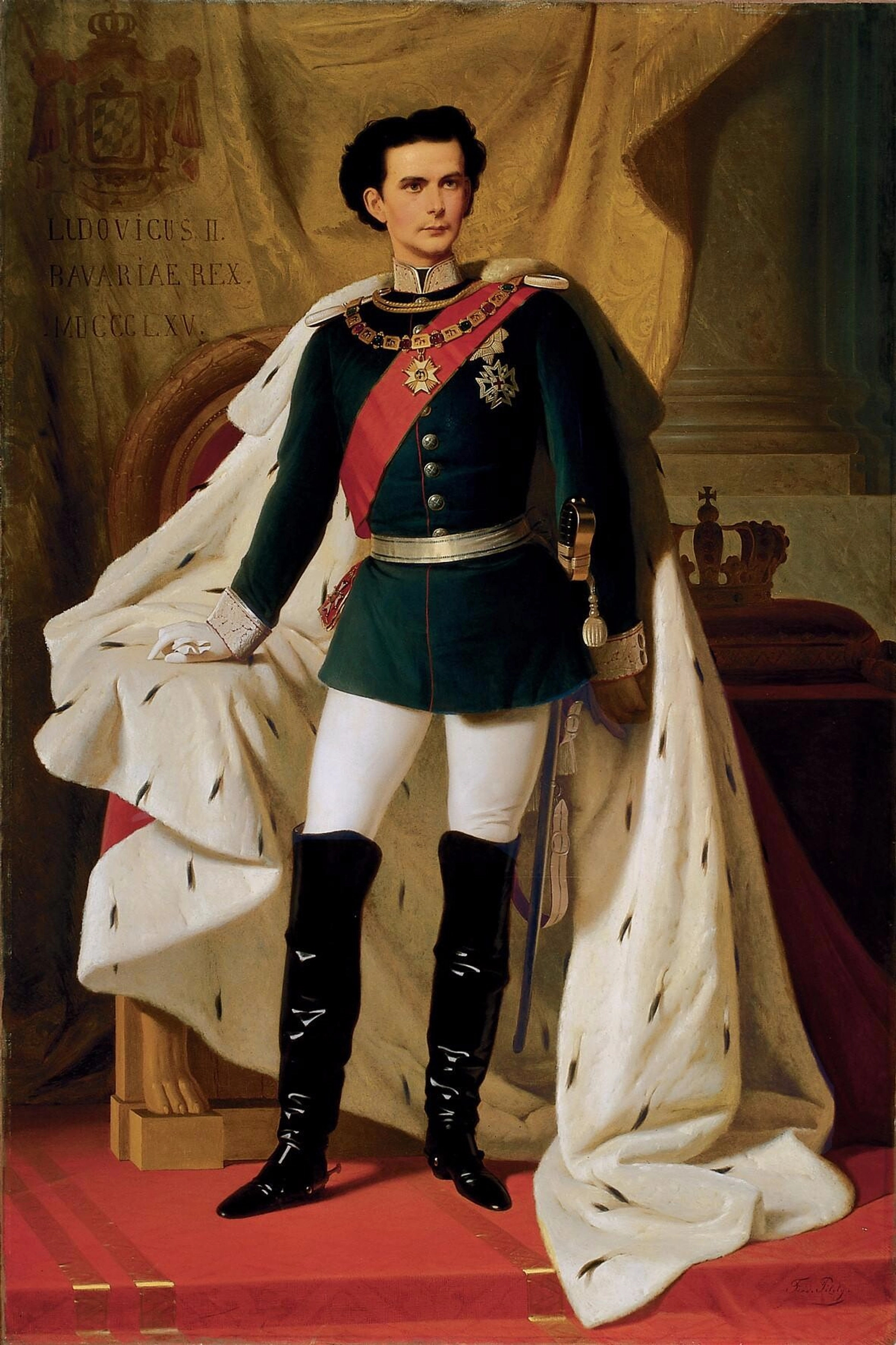
King Ludwig's coronation portrait, 1865

- Harry Baer as Ludwig II
- Ingrid Caven as Lola Montez, Cosima Wagner and the first norn
- Baltharsar Thomass as Ludwig II as a child
- Oskar von Schab as Ludwig I and Karl May
- Eddy Murray as Kainz and Winnetou
- Peter Kern as Lakai Mayr, court barber Hoppe and Röhm
- Gerhard März as Richard Wagner 1
- Annette Tirier as Richard Wagner 2
- Ursula Strätz as the Bulyowski, singer and third norn
- Hanna Köhler as Sissi and second norn
- Johannes Buzalski as Emanuel Geibel and Hitler
- Peter Przygodda as Bismarck
- Gert Haucke as Baron Freyschlag
- Günther Kaufmann as Count Holnstein
- Peter Moland as Minister President Lutz
- Rudi Scheibengraber as Prince Regent Luitpold
- Fridolin Werther as Emperor Wilhelm I

== Reception ==
=== Critical response ===
Vincent Canby of The New York Times reviewed the film in 1980, when it was released in the United States, and compared it to Hitler: A Film from Germany (Our Hitler in the US) which had already been shown in America:

Mr. Syberberg's thoughts about Ludwig often sound like his thoughts about Hitler. "Did he really exist or did we create him in our fantasy?" someone asks. ... In the manner of cabaret theater, the director freely mixes up characters and eras so that, at one point or another, Ludwig shares the stage with Hitler, Ernst Rohm, Tristan, Karl May and a female Richard Wagner as well as a male one. On the soundtrack we occasionally hear snatches of old American radio programs about mythological comic-book characters (the Shadow, Superman, the Lone Ranger, etc.), as well as the soaring Wagner music in which Our Hitler also was drenched. ... Ludwig is a most rigorous kind of film making. The end effect is that of a feature-length montage so dense with associations and references that it is impossible to get them all at one viewing, though not compelling enough to make one want to sit through it all again.

Facets Video released the film on home media in 2009. Michael Atkinson wrote a review for IFC.com:

Syberberg comes at his historical inquisitions from an angle, and Ludwig dallies as much with the infamous monarch’s narcissistic biography as it does with Jarman-esque camp, Wagnerian kitsch, nude girls, 19th century graphics (projected as background sets), cabaret shtick, children with mustaches, stuffed swans, etc. — all of it assembled and explored on a proscenium stage that recalls Méliès in more ways than one. Fairly tongue-in-cheek, Ludwig is more like an epic carny sideshow orchestrated by a guilty Teutonic madman than a film, and stands as the definitive precedent of Syberberg's exhausting Hitler film.

=== Accolades ===
The film received the Deutscher Filmpreis for Best Fiction Film and Best Screenplay. Syberberg was also nominated for Best Director and Ingrid Caven was nominated for Best Supporting Actress. The film competed at the 1974 Valladolid International Film Festival in Spain where it was awarded the Jury Special Prize.
