= The Tenderness of Wolves (film) =

- German theatrical release poster
- Die Zärtlichkeit der Wölfe
- Directed by: Ulli Lommel
- Written by: Kurt Raab
- Produced by: Rainer Werner Fassbinder
- Starring: Kurt Raab; Jeff Roden; Margit Carstensen; Ingrid Caven; Hannelore Tiefenbrunner
- Cinematography: Jürgen Jürges
- Edited by: Thea Eymèsz; Rainer Werner Fassbinder
- Music by: Peer Raben
- Production company: Tango-Film
- Distributed by: Cinegate (1976, UK)
- Release date: 29 June 1973
- Running time: 82 minutes
- Country: West Germany
- Language: German

The Tenderness of Wolves (German: Die Zärtlichkeit der Wölfe) is a 1973 West German crime drama film directed by Ulli Lommel. The story is based on the crimes of German serial killer and cannibal Fritz Haarmann, although the time and place has been changed from 1920's Hannover to the post-war 1950's Ruhr area. It was written by Kurt Raab, who also stars in the film, and produced by Rainer Werner Fassbinder, who also plays a side character. It was entered into the 23rd Berlin International Film Festival.

== Plot ==
In war-torn Germany, a string of violent murders of young men and boys plagues a small town. The culprit is Fritz Haarman, a gay man with a history of petty crimes who works in the community as a government inspector. After carrying out the murders, Fritz butchers the bodies of his victims and he sells the meat to local restaurants and consumes it with his circle of unknowing friends, among them Luise, an aging proprietor of a local restaurant. Among the locals, Fritz has a reputation for exchanging money for sex with teenage boys.

While checking identification cards at a train station one night, Fritz encounters a teenage boy there alone, and without identification. Instead of taking him to the police, Fritz brings him to his home and seduces him. He subsequently kills and butchers him, and then dines on the meat with his close circle. Meanwhile, Fritz carries on a tempestuous relationship with his adult male lover, Hans, engaging in petty schemes to make money. Fritz's neighbor, Frau Linder, who lives in the apartment below him, is suspicious of Fritz, and takes note of odd noises she hears coming from his apartment in the middle of the night.

On one occasion, Fritz kidnaps and kills a young boy. Frau Linder witnesses him leaving the apartment in the middle of the night with several bundles of matter wrapped in parchment paper. She follows him as he disposes of the bundles in the Ruhr River. The next day, Fritz socializes with Dora, his friend, and approaches a teenage piano player in a restaurant. He asks the boy to visit him at his home later, which he obliges. There, Fritz strangles him to death before biting his neck and engaging in necrophilia with the body.

Hans and Dora subsequently arrive at Fritz's apartment, and are shocked to see the boy's body lying in Fritz's bed. Fritz assures Dora he is only sleeping, and asks her to leave. When she returns, the body has disappeared, Hans having helped conceal the crime. Meanwhile, Frau Linder continues to covertly spy on Fritz, and attempts to have police investigate. Hans subsequently ends his relationship with Fritz, leaving Fritz bereft. Meanwhile, Fritz continues to kidnap and murder young boys and men. Unbeknownst to him, Hans goes to police with his knowledge of Fritz's crimes. Police stage a raid on Fritz's apartment as he brings another teenage boy to his apartment. Just as he bites into the teenager's throat, police break into the apartment, alarmed by the young man's screams. Fritz is taken from the apartment in a rage.

Intertitles reveal that Fritz was executed for his crimes.

== Cast ==
- Kurt Raab as Insp. Fritz Haarmann
- Jeff Roden as Hans Grans
- Margit Carstensen as Frau Lindner
- Ingrid Caven as Dora
- Wolfgang Schenck as Kommissar Braun
- Brigitte Mira as Luise Engel
- Rainer Hauer as Kommissar Müller
- Barbara Bertram as Elli
- Rainer Werner Fassbinder as Wittowski
- Heinrich Giskes as Lungis
- Friedrich-Karl Praetorius as Kurt Fromm
- Karl von Liebezeit as Herr Engel
- Walter Kaltheuner as Schuhmacher
- El Hedi ben Salem – Französischer Soldat
- Rainer Will as Opfer (as Reiner Will)

== Release ==
The Tenderness of Wolves was released on 29 June 1973. The film was released in the UK in May 1976 The 2015 Blu-ray release in the USA and the UK by Arrow Video offered a new high definition digital transfer of the film as well as an introduction and audio commentary by Ulli Lommel.

== Reception ==
On Rotten Tomatoes, The Tenderness of Wolves received a score of 63%, based on 8 reviews. Roger Ebert rated the film 2.5 out of 4 stars, calling it " a nasty little melodrama, lurid and creepy and sometimes bordering on demented humor. It's the kind of movie we may not exactly enjoy, but we don't walk out on."

Vincent Canby of The New York Times gave the film a positive review, commending the film's performances, cinematography, and direction. Dennis Schwartz from Ozus' World Movie Reviews awarded the film a grade A, calling it "A wickedly entertaining but harrowing tale"; praising the film's expressionistic style, direction, and Raab's performance. Chris Coffel from Bloody Disgusting praised the film for its historical accuracy, and unconventional narrative, stating that it was arguably Lommel's best film. Clayton Dillard of Slant Magazine awarded the film 4.5 out of 5 stars, writing "If Tenderness of the Wolves works on a reflexive register, it’s due to Raab’s performance, which consistently displays his own homosexuality in a fashion that blurs lines between fiction and documentary, albeit a bit coarsely, since Lommel often trains his camera on Haarmann’s sexual encounters to milk their exploitative potential."
