= Fox and His Friends =

1975 film by Rainer Werner Fassbinder

- German theatrical release poster
- German: Faustrecht der Freiheit
- Directed by: Rainer Werner Fassbinder
- Written by: Rainer Werner Fassbinder; Christian Hohoff
- Produced by: Christian Hohoff
- Starring: Karlheinz Böhm; Rainer Werner Fassbinder; Peter Chatel; Adrian Hoven; Christiane Maybach; Ulla Jacobsson; Rudolf Lenz; Harry Baer; Bruce Low; Barbara Valentin; Peter Kern; Walter Sedlmayr; Evelyn Künneke
- Cinematography: Michael Ballhaus
- Edited by: Thea Eymèsz
- Music by: Peer Raben
- Production companies: Tango Film; City Film
- Distributed by: Filmverlag der Autoren
- Release date: 15 May 1975 (Cannes)
- Running time: 123 minutes
- Country: West Germany
- Language: German

Fox and His Friends (German: Faustrecht der Freiheit, lit. 'Fist-Right of Freedom' is a 1975 West German drama film written and directed by Rainer Werner Fassbinder, starring Fassbinder, Peter Chatel and Karlheinz Böhm.

The plot follows the misadventures of a working-class gay man who wins the lottery, then falls in love with the elegant son of an industrialist. His lover tries to mold him into a gilt-edged mirror of upper-class values, and ultimately swindles the easily flattered "Fox" out of his fortune. The film is an incisive look at the relationship between money and emotions. Love is seen as a commodity that can be bought for money and lasts only as long as it is profitable.

== Plot ==
Franz Bieberkopf (Note: The name of the character was taken from the 1929 novel Berlin Alexanderplatz, which the director later adapted for television. Fassbinder frequently commented, "I am Bieberkopf".) is a sweet and unsophisticated working-class gay man who works in a Munich carnival as "Fox, the Talking Head". He loses his job when his boyfriend Klaus, the carnival owner, is arrested for tax fraud. Fox visits his alcoholic sister Hedwig who cannot help. After losing his remaining money, Fox meets an older man, Max, a sophisticated antique art dealer. Fox swindles ten marks from a gay florist and buys a lottery ticket.

A month later at a party, Max introduces Fox to his cultured gay friends. The handsome but hypocritical Eugen shuns Fox for his proletarian manners, but quickly changes his mind when he learns that Fox has won 500,000 Deutsche Marks in the lottery. Eugen leaves his boyfriend, Philip, and brings Fox to his apartment where they sleep together. The next morning, Philip finds them together, but Eugen convinces Philip to temporarily step aside. Later, Fox and Eugen go to a working-class gay bar and then to an up-market restaurant, where they meet Eugen's two other friends. Eugen takes Fox to his new factory. Later, Fox goes to a gay spa and talks to Max, who suggests investing in Eugen's company.

Eugen gets evicted from his apartment for moral reasons (two men living together), so he convinces Fox to buy them an apartment and furniture from Max. Fox buys them clothes at Eugen's ex-boyfriend Philip's shop. Later, they have lunch at Eugen's parents' home and Fox has no table manners. He signs a contract for a 100,000-Mark loan, which he barely understands, for the failing business run by Eugen's father. Fox lends 30,000 marks to his ex Klaus, which makes Eugen jealous. At the apartment, they throw a party, during which Philip whispers to Max that he might be living there later; the party ends abruptly when Hedwig, drunk, makes a fuss. Fox and Eugen go on holiday to Marrakesh, Morocco to salvage their relationship. In Morocco, they pick up a local male prostitute (El Hedi ben Salem), but he is not let into the hotel because he is a Moroccan.

Back from the holiday, the couple learns the company is bankrupt; the workers cannot be paid. Fox suggests giving his flat to Eugen, so the bank lets him take a loan to pay them. Eugen goes to the opera with Max, leaving Fox alone; Fox goes to the gay bar, throws a fit, gives 500 marks to the florist and runs off. The next day at the factory, Fox makes a mistake with some imprints; Eugen's father tells him off. Later, they all have dinner together and again, Fox has no table manners or savoir-faire. Fox goes to a pub and propositions two American soldiers, but nothing happens. He drives to the gay bar, the florist hits on him, and Fox slaps him; Fox has a panic attack. He tells Eugen about the attack but he doesn't seem to care. The next day, Fox goes to a doctor, who gives him sedative pills.

Fox breaks up with Eugen, who says he is taking the apartment to make up for the bungled imprints. (Although the printing error cost the business 150,000 marks, Fox does not realize that it was covered by Eugen's insurance, ironically purchased with Fox's loan.) At the factory the next day, he is told that the 100,000 marks from the contract was paid back in his monthly salary. Later he goes to the apartment and he is not let in; Eugen changed the locks and has resumed his relationship with Philip. Fox argues with his sister and sleeps in his car. The next day he sells his new car (a De Tomaso Pantera) for only 8,000 marks. Later in the gay bar, Fox sees the American soldiers and they ask him how much he pays; he starts sobbing as the florist tries to console him.

The next day Fox lies dead on the floor in the underground; he has killed himself with Valium. Two schoolboys steal his money and watch. Max and Klaus see him; they leave when they see he is dead, as they do not want to be involved. The boys resume looting Fox's body.

== Cast ==
- Rainer Werner Fassbinder as Franz "Fox" Bieberkopf
- Peter Chatel as Eugen
- Karlheinz Böhm as Max
- Harry Baer as Philip
- Adrian Hoven as Wolf Thiess, Eugen's father
- Ulla Jacobsson as Eugen's mother
- Christiane Maybach as Hedwig, sister
- Hans Zander as Springer, barkeeper
- Kurt Raab as Wodka-Peter
- Karl Scheydt as Klaus
- Peter Kern as Fatty Schmidt, flower salesman
- Walter Sedlmayr as car salesman
- Rudolf Lenz as Dr. Siebenkäss, lawyer
- Bruce Low as Fox's doctor
- Brigitte Mira as Lotto saleswoman
- Evelyn Künneke as the travel agent
- Barbara Valentin as Max's wife
- Ingrid Caven as the nightclub singer
- Marquard Bohm as American soldier
- El Hedi ben Salem as Salem, man in Marocco
- Irm Hermann as Madame Cherie from Paris

== Reception ==
On the review aggregator website Rotten Tomatoes, 86% of 21 critics' reviews are positive.

Film critic Kevin Thomas wrote it is a "bleak film, an indictment not of gays but of contemporary life as it is lived virtually everywhere in the so–called civilized world; as more often than not in a Fassbinder film, stunning imagery and succinct performances by his repertory of players abound." Critic Kevin Kelly wrote in The Boston Globe that, "it's a harsh, accurate, steamy, slightly monotonous look at a tight group of homosexuals but, more than that, or rather, more to Fassbinder's point, it reveals the gay lifestyle as no better, no worse than playing it straight."

Tony Mastroianni of the Cleveland Press commented the "acting is reasonably good considering the material and swishiness is at a minimum; the dialog and situations are often laughable when they were intended to be taken seriously; Fassbinder does succeed, however, in creating a specific world; it isn't real and it seems to exist in a vacuum; but this is hardly enough for a movie that drags on to what seems unbearable lengths." Film critic Les Wedman observed "the film itself is overly long as Fassbinder prolongs his stylized story–telling; at the same time, though, he provides a close–up look at the pain of an innocent young man trapped and betrayed by his impossible love."

In his review for the Austin American-Statesman, Paul Beutel states that "what makes Fassbinder's film truly remarkable is its total lack of sensationalism, in spite of its subject; it is the first film about homosexuals that does not capitalize on sniggering gay jokes, have its characters rage with guilt over the way they are, or embarrass the straight audience with exploitative presentation of deviant behavior." Donna Chernin of The Plain Dealer had harsh words for the film opining that "it would be hard to find a more joyless film than Fox and His Friends; the movie is relentless in its downbeat message that life is tawdry, that integrity and generosity will never reap any reward except a stab in the back and that the world's only winners are its rascals."

== Events at screenings ==
At the first showing in France, on 27 January 1978 at the Festival du film homosexuel, twenty far-right militants interrupted the screening. They stole the proceeds and caused six injuries.

== See also ==
- List of lesbian, gay, bisexual, or transgender-related films by storyline
- List of LGBTQ-related films of 1975
