= Day of the Idiots =

- Screenshot of Carole Bouquet
- Directed by: Werner Schroeter
- Written by: Dana Horaková; Werner Schroeter
- Produced by: Karel Dirka; Peter Genée; Harald Kügler
- Starring: Carole Bouquet; Ingrid Caven; Christine Kaufmann
- Cinematography: Ivan Slapeta
- Edited by: Catherine Brasier-Snopko
- Music by: Peer Raben
- Distributed by: OKO-Film
- Release date: October 31, 1981 (West Germany)
- Running time: 110 min.
- Country: West Germany
- Language: German

Day of the Idiots (German: Tag der Idioten) is a 1981 West German psychological fantasy film drama directed and written by Werner Schroeter. It stars Carole Bouquet as a disturbed mental patient with an inclination to remove her clothes and Ingrid Caven as Dr. Laura and Christine Kaufmann as Ruth.

The film was nominated for a Golden Palm Award at the 1982 Cannes Film Festival and won best film at the 1982 German Film Awards going to director Werner Schroeter.

== Cast ==
- Carole Bouquet as Carole
- Ingrid Caven as Dr. Laura
- Christine Kaufmann as Ruth
- Ida Di Benedetto as Elisabet
- Carola Regnier as Ninon
- Mostefa Djadjam as Alexander
- Hermann Killmeyer as Markus
- Marie-Luise Marjan as Schwester Marjan
- Magdalena Montezuma as Zigeunerin
- George Stamkoski as himself
- Tamara Kafka
- Dana Medřická
- Fritz Schediwy
- Jana Plichtová
