= The Last Summer of the Rich =

2014 film

- Film poster
- Directed by: Peter Kern
- Written by: Peter Kern
- Starring: Amira Casar
- Release dates: 24 April 2014 (Austria); 7 February 2015 (Berlin)
- Country: Austria
- Language: German

The Last Summer of the Rich (German: Der letzte Sommer der Reichen) is a 2014 Austrian drama film directed by Peter Kern. It was screened in the Panorama section of the 65th Berlin International Film Festival.

== Cast ==
- Amira Casar as Hanna von Stezewitz
- Nicole Gerdon as Sarah
- Winfried Glatzeder as Boris
- Margarete Tiesel
- Nicole Beutler as Katharina Lehrnickel

== See also ==
- List of lesbian, gay, bisexual or transgender-related films of 2015
