= Ingrid Caven =

German film actress and singer

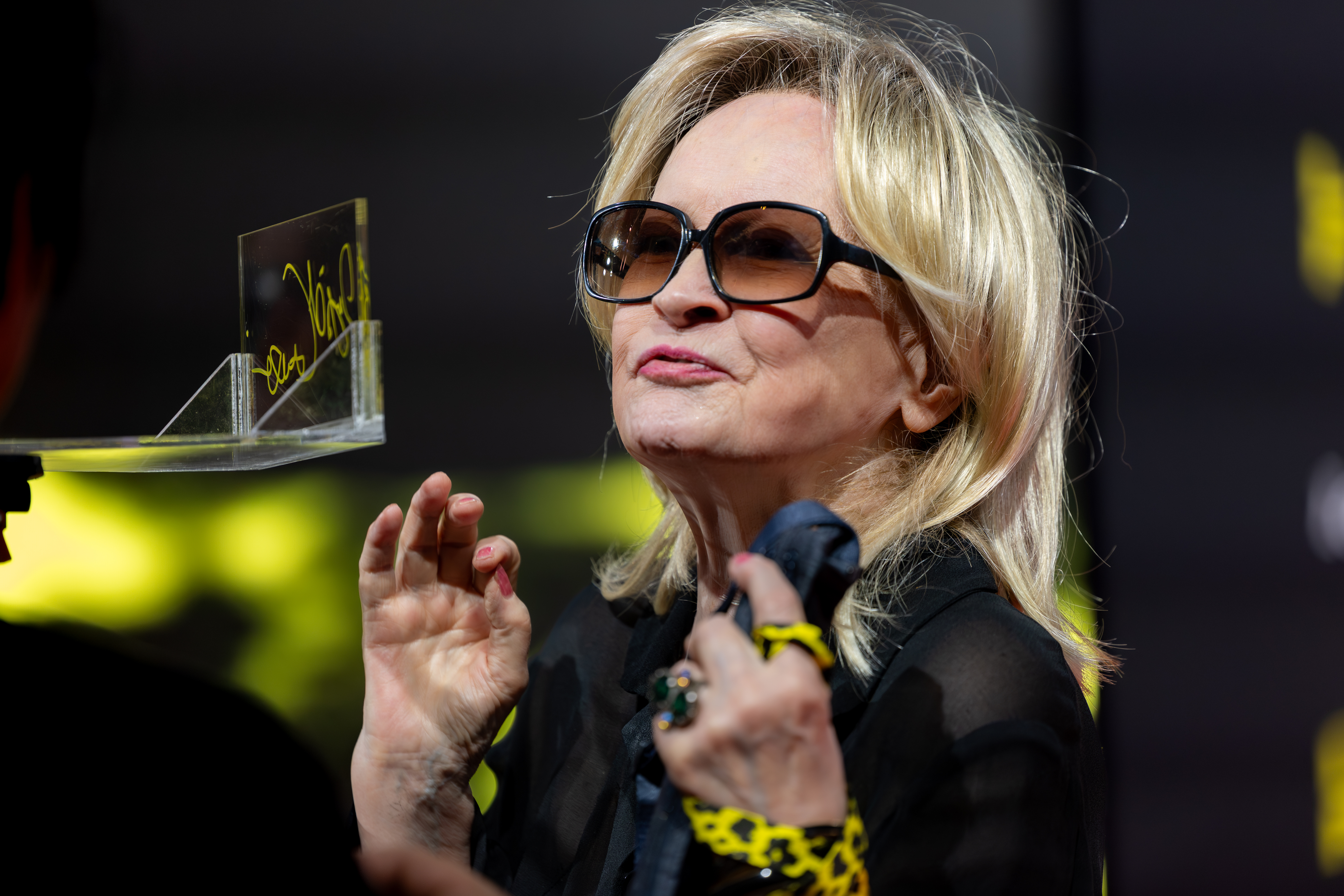
- Caven in 2026
- Born: Ingrid Schmidt; 3 August 1938 (age 88); Saarbrücken, Germany
- Occupation: Actress
- Years active: 1969–present
- Spouse: Rainer Werner Fassbinder (m. 1970; div. 1972)
- Partner: Jean-Jacques Schuhl
- Relatives: Trudeliese Schmidt (sister)

Ingrid Caven (born 3 August 1938) is a German film actress and singer. She is best known for her roles in several films directed by her husband, Rainer Werner Fassbinder, including Love Is Colder Than Death (1969), Why Does Herr R. Run Amok? (1970), and The American Soldier (1970). She continued to appear in Fassbinder's films after their 1972 divorce until his death in 1982. She has also appeared in Silent Night (1995), 35 Shots of Rum (2009) and Suspiria (2018).

== Early life ==
Caven was born Ingrid Schmidt in Saarbrücken, Germany on 3 August 1938. She had one younger sister, Trudeliese Schmidt (1943–2004), who went on to become an opera singer. Caven's father worked as a tobacco trader. Prior to establishing herself as a film actress in the 1970s, Caven worked as a teacher in Upper Bavaria.

== Career ==
Caven originally began acting onstage in Rainer Werner Fassbinder's antiteater (Anti-Theater) acting troupe in the 1960s. Her film debut was in 1969 in the short film Fernes Jamaica; this was swiftly followed by her first feature film Love Is Colder Than Death, directed by Fassbinder, to whom she was briefly married (1970–1972). She also had a supporting role in his film The Merchant of Four Seasons (1970), a drama about a farmer who drinks himself to death. Even after their divorce, Caven remained a frequent collaborator of Fassbinder until his death in 1982, also appearing in his films La Paloma (1974), Fox and His Friends (1975), and Mother Küsters' Trip to Heaven (1975).

Her career was at its peak in the 1970s and early 1980s, mostly in film. In the 1970s, while making films in France, Caven became acquainted with fashion designer Yves Saint Laurent, and became one of his muses; he designed one of her stage costumes during her career as a singer.

In 1979 she was a member of the jury at the 29th Berlin International Film Festival. In 1981 Caven starred alongside Carole Bouquet in the film Day of the Idiots as a doctor, and the next year she won an award for Outstanding Individual Achievement: Actress at the German Film Awards for her performance as Inga in the film Looping.

In 2000 she appeared in Rosa von Praunheim's film Fassbinder's Women. Caven has appeared in several films since the turn of the millennium, including supporting parts in Claire Denis's 35 Shots of Rum (2009), and Luca Guadagnino's American remake of Suspiria (2018).

== Personal life ==
Caven has lived in Paris since 1977. She resides with her partner, French writer Jean-Jacques Schuhl, whose book Ingrid Caven won the Prix Goncourt in 2000.

In January 2018, Caven, along with 99 other French women writers, performers and academics, signed an open letter that argued the #MeToo movement had gone too far, turning into a "witch hunt", and denounced it as a form of puritanism. The letter defended men’s “freedom to bother women,” which they said was “indispensable to sexual freedom.”

== Selected filmography ==
Year	Title	Role	Notes
1969	Love Is Colder Than Death	Prostituierte	German: Liebe ist kälter als der Tod
1970	Gods of the Plague	Magdalena Fuller	German: Götter der Pest
1970	Why Does Herr R. Run Amok?	Nachbarin	German: Warum läuft Herr R. Amok?
1970	The American Soldier	Sängerin	German: Der amerikanische Soldat
1970	The Niklashausen Journey	Screaming girl	Television film; German: Niklashauser Fart
1971	The Merchant of Four Seasons	Hans's great love	German: Händler der vier Jahreszeiten
1971	Rio das Mortes	Hannas Kollegin	Television film
1971	Beware of a Holy Whore	Statistin	German: Warnung vor einer heiligen Nutte
1971	Die Ahnfrau - Oratorium nach Franz Grillparzer	Geist	Television film
1972	Ludwig: Requiem for a Virgin King	Lola Montez / Erste Norna	German: Ludwig – Requiem für einen jungfräulichen König
1972	Tonight or Never	Actress	German: Heute nacht oder nie
1973	The Tenderness of Wolves	Dora	German: Die Zärtlichkeit der Wölfe
1973	World on a Wire	Urschi	Miniseries; German: Welt am Draht
1974	Martha	Ilse	Television film
1974	La Paloma	La Paloma	
1974	My Little Loves	La mère	French: Mes Petites Amoureuses
1975	Playing with Fire	La servante du bordel	French: Le Jeu avec le feu
1975	Fox and His Friends	Sängerin	German: Faustrecht der Freiheit
1975	Mother Küsters' Trip to Heaven	Corinna	German: Mutter Küsters Fahrt zum Himmel
1975	Fear of Fear	Edda	Television film; German: Angst vor der Angst
1975	Lieber Franz ich liebe Dich	Lillian	
1976	Shadow of Angels	Lily Brest	German: Schatten der Engel
1976	I Only Want You to Love Me	Nähmaschinenverkäuferin	Television film; German: Ich will doch nur, daß ihr mich liebt
1976	Goldflocken		
1976	A Young Emmanuelle	Anne	French: Néa
1976	Satan's Brew	Lisa	German: Satansbraten
1977	Violanta	Alma	
1978	Despair	Hotel Manager	
1978	In a Year of 13 Moons	Die rote Zora	German: In einem Jahr mit 13 Monden
1980	Narcissus and Psyche	Ingrid	
1981	Malou	Malou	
1981	Looping	Lissy	Filmband in Gold für darstellerische Leistung beim Deutschen Filmpreis
1981	Day of the Idiots	Dr. Laura	German: Tag der Idioten
1982	Hors Saison	Lila	
1983	The Roaring Fifties	Claudine	German: Die wilden Fünfziger
1986	L'araignée de satin	Mme de Challens	
1987	Devil's Paradise	Madame	German: Des Teufels Paradies
1993	My Favorite Season	La femme du bar	French: Ma saison préférée
1995	Silent Night	Sängerin	German: Stille Nacht
1999	Le Temps retrouvé		German: Die wiedergefundene Zeit
1999	Marcel Proust's Time Regained	La princesse Russe	
2006	Deepfrozen	Vicki	
2009	35 Shots of Rum	La tante allemande	
2016	Sleeping Beauty	La fée méchante	
2018	Suspiria	Miss Vendegast	
2018	The Portuguese Woman	Passageira	Portuguese: A Portuguesa

== Discography ==
=== Albums ===
- Au Pigall's (1978 LP Barclay, live in Paris, re-released on CD Barclay in 2001)
- Der Abendstern (1979 LP RCA, re-released on CD Viellieb Rekords in 1999)
- Live In Hamburg (1980 LP RCA, concert at Audimax Hamburg, May 9, 1980)
- Erinnerungen An Édith Piaf (1983 LP RCA, Édith Piaf chansons with German lyrics)
- Spass (1986 LP Schariwari)
- Chante Piaf 'En Public' (1989 LP Clever, recorded in 1988, live at Théâtre de l'Athénée, Paris, re-released on CD Fpr Music in 2001)
- Chambre 1050 (1996 CD Arcade/2000 CD Tricatel, 13 songs from Helle Nacht in French)
- Helle Nacht (1998 CD Viellieb Rekords, 16 songs, German version of Chambre 1050)

=== Soundtracks ===
- Chansons und Themen aus Fassbinder Filmen (1994 CD Alhambra, includes 3 Caven songs from the movie "Mutter Küsters Fahrt zum Himmel/Mother Kuesters Goes To Heaven", 1975)
- Hors saison (CD released in Japan in 1993, includes 6 songs sung by Ingrid Caven)

== Works cited ==
- Fischer, Michael; Hörner, Fernand (2013). Lied und populäre Kultur - Song and Popular Culture (in German). Vol. 57. Germany: Waxmann Verlag. ISBN 978-3-830-97787-2.
- Lorenz, Juliane; Schmid, Marion; Gehr, Herbert, eds. (1999). Chaos as Usual: Conversations about Rainer Werner Fassbinder. New York: Applause Books. ISBN 978-1-557-83359-4.
- Reimer, Robert C.; Reimer, Carol (2010). The A to Z of German Cinema. Lanham, Maryland: Scarecrow Press. ISBN 978-1-461-73186-3.
