= Querelle =

- Theatrical release poster
- Directed by: Rainer Werner Fassbinder
- Screenplay by: Rainer Werner Fassbinder; Burkhard Driest
- Based on: Querelle of Brest (1947 novel) by Jean Genet
- Produced by: Dieter Schidor
- Starring: Brad Davis; Franco Nero; Jeanne Moreau; Laurent Malet; Hanno Pöschl; Günther Kaufmann
- Cinematography: Xaver Schwarzenberger; Josef Vavra
- Edited by: Franz Walsch; Juliane Lorenz
- Music by: Peer Raben
- Production company: Planet-Film; Albatros Filmproduktion; Gaumont S.A. Paris
- Distributed by: Scotia (West Germany); Gaumont Distribution (France)
- Release dates: August 1982 (Montreal); 8 September 1982 (France); 16 September 1982 (West Germany)
- Running time: 108 minutes
- Countries: West Germany; France
- Language: English
- Budget: DEM4 million

Querelle (German: Querelle - Ein Pakt mit dem Teufel, lit. 'Querelle – A Pact with the Devil') is a 1982 erotic crime drama film directed by Rainer Werner Fassbinder, adapted by Fassbinder and Burkhard Driest from Jean Genet's 1947 novel Querelle of Brest. It stars Brad Davis in the titular role of Belgian sailor Georges Querelle, who is both a thief and murderer. The cast also features Franco Nero, Jeanne Moreau, Laurent Malet, Hanno Pöschl and Günther Kaufmann.

The film is a West German and French co-production, shot in English. This was Fassbinder's last film, premiering shortly after his death at the age of 37. It received generally positive reviews, including a nomination for Golden Lion at the 1982 Venice Film Festival.

== Plot ==
When Belgian sailor Georges Querelle's ship, Le Vengeur, arrives in Brest, he visits the Feria, a bar and brothel for sailors run by Madame Lysiane, whose lover, Robert, is Querelle's brother. Querelle has a love/hate relationship with his brother: when they meet at La Feria, they embrace, but also punch one another slowly and repeatedly in the belly. Lysiane's husband Nono works behind the bar and also manages La Feria's illicit affairs with the assistance of his friend Mario, the corrupt police captain.

Querelle makes a deal to sell opium to Nono. During the execution of the deal, he murders his accomplice Vic by slitting his throat. After delivering the drugs, Querelle announces that he wants to sleep with Lysiane. He knows that this means he will have to throw dice with Nono, who has the privilege of playing a game of chance with all of her prospective lovers. If Nono loses, the suitor is allowed to proceed with his affair.

If the suitor loses, he must submit to anal sex with Nono first, according to Nono's maxim: "That way, I can say my wife only sleeps with arseholes." Querelle deliberately loses the game, allowing himself to be sodomized by Nono. When Nono gloats about Querelle's "loss" to Robert, who won his dice game, the brothers end up in a violent fight. Afterwards, Querelle has sex with Mario.

Back on the ship, a builder, Gil Turko, murders his work mate Theo, who had been harassing and sexually assaulting him. Gil hides from the police in an abandoned prison, and Roger, who is in love with Gil, establishes contact between Querelle and Gil in the hopes that Querelle can help Gil escape. Querelle falls in love with Gil, who closely resembles his brother. Gil returns his affections, but Querelle betrays Gil by tipping off the police. Querelle cleverly arranged it so that the murder of Vic is also blamed on Gil.

A perennial undercurrent in the film is that Querelle's superior, Lieutenant Seblon, is in love with Querelle, and constantly tries to prove his manliness to him. Seblon is aware that Querelle murdered Vic, but chooses to protect him.

The film ends with the sailors aboard Le Vengeur, presumably about to leave port. A heartbroken Lysiane, spurned by Querelle, conducts a tarot reading for Robert: she realizes that he and Querelle were never brothers after all. As Lysiane laughs maniacally, we see Querelle's birth record transcribed on-screen.

== Cast ==
- Brad Davis as Georges Querelle
- Franco Nero as Lieutenant Seblon
- Jeanne Moreau as Lysiane
- Laurent Malet as Roger Bataille
- Hanno Pöschl as Robert / Gil Turko
- Günther Kaufmann as Nono
- Burkhard Driest as Mario
- Roger Fritz as Marcellin
- Neil Bell as Theo
- Dieter Schidor as Vic Rivette
- Natja Brunckhorst as Paulette
- Werner Asam and Axel Bauer as Workers
- Y Sa Lo as Prostitute
- Volker Spengler as Transvestite
- Harry Baer as Armenian Man
- Robert van Ackeren, Wolf Gremm, and Frank Ripploh as Drunken legionnaires

== Production ==
According to Genet's biographer Edmund White, Querelle was originally going to be made by Werner Schroeter, with a scenario by Burkhard Driest, and produced by Dieter Schidor. Schidor could not find the money to finance a film by Schroeter, and therefore turned to other directors, including John Schlesinger and Sam Peckinpah, before settling on Fassbinder. Driest wrote a radically different script for Fassbinder, who then "took the linear narrative and jumbled it up".

White quotes Schidor as saying "Fassbinder did something totally different, he took the words of Genet and tried to meditate on something other than the story. The story became totally unimportant for him. He also said publicly that the story was a sort of third-rate police story that wouldn't be worth making a movie about without putting a particular moral impact into it".

Schroeter had wanted to make a black and white film with amateur actors and location shots, but Fassbinder shot it with professional actors in a lurid, expressionist color, and on sets in the studio. Edmund White comments that the result is a film in which, "Everything is bathed in an artificial light and the architectural elements are all symbolic."

The entire film was shot on sets at CCC-Spandau Studios in Berlin. The highly-stylized sets were designed by Rolf Zehetbauer. Harry Baer was Fassbinder's assistant director on the film. The French version of the film was written by Catherine Breillat.

Stylistically, the film is inspired heavily by the works of erotic artist Tom of Finland. Besides costume design and hair styles, actors were posed in silhouettes and scenarios common to Tom of Finland artwork. "The director Rainer Werner Fassbinder took obvious cues from Tom of Finland in his 1982 film adaptation of Jean Genet’s novel Querelle. As the eponymous lead, actor Brad Davis was Tom’s sailor come to life."

== Release ==
The film premiered at the Montreal World Film Festival in August 1982, two months after Fassbinder's death in June of that year. It was released in France on 8 September and in West Germany a little over a week later.

== Reception ==
=== Box office ===
Released after the death of the director, Querelle sold more than 100,000 tickets in the first three weeks after its release in Paris, the first time that a film with a gay theme had achieved such success.

=== Critical response ===
On review aggregator Rotten Tomatoes, the film has an approval rating of 65%, based on 17 reviews, with a weighted average rating of 6.30/10. Writing for The New York Times critic Vincent Canby noted that Querelle was "a mess...a detour that leads to a dead end."

Querelle competed at the 1982 Venice Film Festival. French director Marcel Carné was head of the festival jury and believed it should have won the Golden Lion, saying, "I would love to express my disappointment in not having been able to convince my colleagues to place R.W. Fassbinder's Querelle among the winners. As a matter of fact, I've found myself alone in defending the movie. Nevertheless, I keep on thinking that, although controversial, R.W. Fassbinder's final movie, want it or not, love it or hate it, will one day find its place in the history of cinema."

Penny Ashbrook calls Querelle Fassbinder's "perfect epitaph: an intensely personal statement that is the most uncompromising portrayal of gay male sensibility to come from a major filmmaker." Edmund White considers Querelle the only film based on Genet's book that works, calling it "visually as artificial and menacing as Genet's prose." Genet, in discussion with Schidor, said that he had not seen the film, commenting "You can't smoke at the movies."

== Soundtrack ==
The soundtrack, by Peer Raben, was nominated in the category of "Worst Musical Score" at the 4th Golden Raspberry Awards. The soundtrack included two original songs that were each also nominated for a Razzie in the "Worst Original Song" category:

- Jeanne Moreau – "Each Man Kills the Things He Loves" (music by Peer Raben, lyrics from Oscar Wilde's poem "The Ballad of Reading Gaol")
- "Young and Joyful Bandit" (Music by Peer Raben, lyrics by Jeanne Moreau)
