= Walter Bockmayer =

German film director

- Born: 4 July 1948; Fehrbach, Germany
- Died: 7 October 2014 (aged 66); Cologne, Germany
- Occupations: Film director, screenwriter, actor
- Years active: 1975–1988

Walter Bockmayer (4 July 1948 – 7 October 2014) was a German film director, screenwriter and actor. He directed seven films between 1975 and 1988. His 1978 film Flaming Hearts was entered into the 28th Berlin International Film Festival. He found a new home with the Scala Theater in Cologne, where the first stage play Ich möch zu Foß noh Kölle jonn was performed in 2003. Bockmayer's new plays were performed annually in the theater, which had a capacity of 260 people. He relocated famous operas such as Carmen (1995) or La traviata (1998) to the setting of the Klapperhof in Cologne or to a massage parlor. He died of lung cancer in 2014.

== Selected filmography ==
Director

- Jane Is Jane Forever (1977)
- Flaming Hearts (1978) (Deutscher Filmpreis: Filmband in Silber (Enten-Produktion))
- Looping (1981) (Deutscher Filmpreis: Filmband in Gold)
- Kiez (1983)
- The Vulture Wally (1988)

Actor

- In a Year of 13 Moons (1978), as Seelenfrieda
- Im Himmel ist die Hölle los (1984), as Marianne Sommer
- The Vulture Wally (1988), as Christel von der Post
