= Ali: Fear Eats the Soul =

1974 film

- German theatrical release poster
- Angst essen Seele auf
- Directed by: Rainer Werner Fassbinder
- Written by: Rainer Werner Fassbinder
- Produced by: Rainer Werner Fassbinder
- Starring: Brigitte Mira; El Hedi ben Salem; Barbara Valentin
- Cinematography: Jürgen Jürges
- Edited by: Thea Eymèsz
- Production company: Tango-Film
- Distributed by: Filmverlag der Autoren GmbH & Co. Vertriebs KG
- Release date: 5 March 1974 (West Germany)
- Running time: 93 minutes
- Country: West Germany
- Language: German

Ali: Fear Eats the Soul (German: Angst essen Seele auf) is a 1974 West German melodrama film written and directed by Rainer Werner Fassbinder, starring Brigitte Mira and El Hedi ben Salem. The film won the International Federation of Film Critics award for best in-competition movie and the Prize of the Ecumenical Jury at the 1974 Cannes Film Festival. It is considered one of Fassbinder's most powerful works and hailed by many as a masterpiece.

The film revolves around the romance that develops between Emmi, an older German woman, and Ali, a Moroccan migrant worker in postwar West Germany.

== Plot ==
The film takes place in West Germany an unspecified number of months after the Munich Massacre. Emmi, a 60-year-old window cleaner and widow, enters a bar, driven in by the rain and wanting to listen to the music being played inside. The barmaid, Barbara, goads Ali, a Moroccan Gastarbeiter (guest worker) in his late thirties, to ask Emmi to dance. She accepts. They develop a friendship and Ali ends up staying overnight at Emmi's apartment. After more interaction, their connection deepens and Ali moves in. Eager to share her happiness, Emmi tells her daughter, Krista, and son-in-law, Eugen. Eugen scoffs and says Emmi has lost her mind, while Krista dismisses it as a folly fueled by years of widowhood.

Their relationship is threatened when the landlord's son, who has been sent on the assumption that Emmi has taken in a lodger, tells Emmi that subletting is against Emmi's tenancy agreement, and that Ali must leave within a day. Fearful of losing Ali, Emmi says she and Ali are planning to marry. After the landlord's son apologises for the misapprehension and leaves, Emmi speaks to Ali and apologises for having invented the idea of her marrying him, but is surprised when Ali says it is an excellent idea. The film then shows them leaving civil court, married.

Their marriage is looked upon unfavorably by their neighbors and shopkeepers. Emmi's colleagues shun her, and Ali faces discrimination at every turn. When Emmi invites her three children and son-in-law to meet Ali, they openly reject him. One of Emmi's sons smashes her TV set in anger and the other declares she must have lost her mind, calling her a "whore". Before they leave Emmi's apartment, Krista calls it a "pigsty".

Emmi's sadness about this rejection fades as her optimism resurfaces and she decides that she and Ali should take a holiday together to escape the discrimination, convinced that upon their return, they will have been missed and be welcomed back. Upon their return, they face less discrimination, but only because their neighbours and shopkeepers see the gain in treating them better, not because they have outgrown their prejudices.

Wanting to get back with her old friends after their apparent renewed respect, Emmi begins to neglect Ali and adopt some of their attitudes toward him. She becomes stricter, ordering him to do more things. When co-workers visit and remark on how clean he is and admire his muscles, she shows him off like an object. This causes Ali to leave, which Emmi explains to her friends as moodiness and a "foreigner mentality". Ali seeks comfort in Barbara, with whom it is suggested he had a relationship before meeting Emmi. Ali returns to Barbara another day, spending the night with her. Emmi visits Ali at work, where he pretends he doesn't know her; his workmates make fun of her age, calling her his "Moroccan grandmother". Ali does not intervene.

When it seems the relationship is beyond repair, Emmi goes back to the bar where they first met. She has Barbara play the same song on the jukebox that led to their dance at the film's beginning. Dancing together, Emmi says she knows she is old and that he is free to come and go, but that when they are together, they must be kind to each other. Ali agrees and they declare their love. Ali then collapses from a burst stomach ulcer and is taken to the hospital with Emmi at his side. A doctor tells her the illness is common among foreign workers because of the stress they face. He explains that Ali will undergo surgery to remove the ulcer, but will probably be back in six months with another. Emmi says she will do everything in her power to prevent that from happening. The film ends with her holding Ali's hand.

== Cast ==
- Brigitte Mira – Emmi Kurowski
- El Hedi ben Salem – Ali
- Barbara Valentin – Barbara
- Irm Hermann – Krista
- Rainer Werner Fassbinder – Eugen
- Karl Scheydt – Albert Kurowski
- Marquard Bohm – Gruber
- Walter Sedlmayr – Angermayer
- Doris Mattes – Mrs. Angermeyer (as Doris Mathes)
- Lilo Pempeit – Mrs. Münchmeyer
- Gusti Kreissl – Paula
- Margit Symo – Hedwig
- Elisabeth Bertram – Frieda
- Helga Ballhaus – Yolanda
- Elma Karlowa – Mrs. Kargus
- Anita Bucher – Mrs. Ellis
- Katharina Herberg – Woman in Bar

== Production ==
The film was shot in just under two weeks, and was planned as an exercise in film-making for Fassbinder, to fill in the time in his schedule between the work on two other films, Martha and Effi Briest.

Ali is played by El Hedi ben Salem, who was Fassbinder's partner at the time. Fassbinder has a cameo appearance as Eugen. Irm Hermann, who plays Krista, had a turbulent relationship with Fassbinder in real life, having been quoted as saying of him, "He couldn't conceive of my refusing him, and he tried everything. He almost beat me to death on the streets of Bochum". Fassbinder grew up with some of the domestic effects of anti-immigrant prejudice: his mother immigrated back to Germany from Poland after the Soviet Occupation and Fassbinder grew up in a turbulent and eventually divorcing household where immigrating relatives stayed with them.

The original German title Angst essen Seele auf is deliberately grammatically incorrect, translating literally as "Fear eat up soul". The correct German is "Angst isst die Seele auf" – which (without the definite article "die") became the title of a related 2002 short film also starring Mira. The title is one of the things Ali tells Emmi. As an immigrant, he speaks in what could be called "broken German". The line of dialogue he utters is simply "Fear eat soul up." Ali's poor German grammar is translated literally in the film's English subtitles, which are consequently full of grammatical errors.

Ali is in part an homage to the films of Douglas Sirk, in particular Imitation of Life (1959) and All That Heaven Allows (1955). The most overt homage is the scene in which Emmi's son kicks in the television (an important symbol in All That Heaven Allows) after finding out that his mother has married a north African.

== Themes and symbolism ==
"Fear eat up soul", one of the things Ali says while talking with Emmi early in the movie, becomes almost literal later on, when Ali has an ulcer and is hospitalised. The characters are often shown on screen in exaggerated ways; characters are shown far from the camera to emphasise how distant from society Emmi and Ali feel, while their apartment is shot claustrophobically to symbolise the fear they feel in their relationship and everyday life. Spectatorship in the film embodies social oppression against the marginalized, yet ironically, such distancing diminishes when the neighbourhood sees utilitarian value in Emmi and Ali as "productive and consuming bodies".

== Release ==
Ali: Fear Eats the Soul was released in West Germany on March 5, 1974. The film has been released by the Criterion Collection as a region 1 DVD with English subtitles. The Blu-Ray contains the contents of both discs of the 2003 DVD release, which include interviews with actress Brigitte Mira and editor Thea Eymes. A BBC documentary about German directors of the era, which compares Fassbinder, Werner Herzog, and Wim Wenders, is also included.

== Reception ==
=== Upon release ===
The film gained critical acclaim upon its release, with its tone and Fassbinder's direction singled out as highlights. Writing for The Chicago Sun-Times, Roger Ebert gave the film 4 out of 4 stars, writing: "[Fassbinder] nudges us to get outside the movie and look at it as absurd, as black humor, as [a] comment on these people so hopelessly trapped in their dreary surroundings and by their fates...Is [Fassbinder] sometimes being deliberately funny? I’m sure of it. His style and tone are so adamant that audiences sometimes just sit in silence, uncertain of the right response. With some films, that indicates the director's loss of control over tone. With Fassbinder, it seems to be the response he wants." Gene Moskowitz of Variety gave it a similarly positive review, calling the film "Not showy for exploitation, too observant and cool for robust hypoing". Vincent Canby of The New York Times dissented somewhat, calling it a "courageous attempt" and praising Mira and Salem's performances, while criticizing the movie's "posterlike blandness". Despite the acclaim it received, Fassbinder said he thought it was only his eighth-best film.

=== Modern reception ===
The film has continued to receive positive reviews, with Mira and Salem's acting praised as a highlight. On Rotten Tomatoes, the film has an approval rating of 100%, based on 36 reviews, with an average rating of 9.3/10. The website's critical consensus reads "Regarded as one of the high-water marks in German New Wave cinema of the 1970s, Ali: Fear Eats the Soul is at once an intense portrayal of a relationship and a tribute to one of Rainer Werner Fassbinder's film heroes, Douglas Sirk."

Martin Scorsese included it on a list of "39 Essential Foreign Films for a Young Filmmaker."

In a review for The New York Times, Alex Abramovich called Ali: Fear Eats the Soul "The most thought-provoking, and beautiful, of [Fassbinder's] films". Richard Brody of The New Yorker praised the direction, writing, "Fassbinder uses the camera with a precise, novelistic touch", and Fassbinder's tributes to other films, writing that Fassbinder "didn't just make use of prior forms, he quoted them, and derived from them the ironies implicit in his melodramatic styles." Peter Bradshaw of The Guardian gave the film five out of five stars, calling it a "heart-rending and extremely prescient drama". Re-reviewing the movie for the Great Movies list, Ebert called the film "very powerful" and ended his review by writing "Ali: Fear Eats the Soul might sound like improbable, contrived soap opera. It doesn't play that way."

In The Sight and Sound Greatest Films of All Time 2012 critic's poll, the film was ranked at 93rd place. In The Sight and Sound Greatest Films of All Time 2022, Ali: Fear Eats the Soul rose to 52nd place in both the critics' and directors' polls.

== Accolades ==
Awards	Year/ Date of ceremony	Category	Recipient(s)	Result	Ref(s)
Cannes Film Festival	May 9–24, 1974	International Federation of Film Critics best film (In competition)	Rainer Werner Fassbinder	Won	
Cannes Film Festival	May 9–24, 1974	Prize of the Ecumenical Jury	Ali: Fear eats the soul	Won	
Chicago International Film Festival	1974	Silver Hugo	Ali: Fear Eats the Soul	Won	
German Film Award	1974	Best Leading Actress	Brigitte Mira	Won	
