= Lilo Ramdohr =

German Resistance member (1913–2013)

Lieselotte Fürst-Ramdohr
- Born: 11 October 1913; Aschersleben, Germany
- Died: 13 May 2013 (aged 99); Starnberg, Germany
- Known for: member of the White Rose resistance group in Nazi Germany

Lieselotte "Lilo" Fürst-Ramdohr (11 October 1913 – 13 May 2013) was a member of the Munich branch of the student resistance group White Rose (Weiße Rose) in Nazi Germany. She was born in Aschersleben.

== Early life ==
Ramdohr was a descendant of a merchant family from Aschersleben. After half a year in England and one year at the boarding school of Fritz Weiß in Weimar where her friendship with Falk Harnack began (for a while, they were engaged), she moved to Munich in 1934 to become a stage designer. From March 1935 to February 1936, she learned book illustration at the Württembergische Kunstgewerbeschule in Stuttgart. In 1936, she moved to Dresden to attend dance school until the Nazis closed it. Ramdohr switched to a state-run school in Stuttgart, and later ran a private school in Heilbronn. She eventually married Otto Berndl, son of a Bavarian architect. Her religious preference was Lutheran.

== The White Rose ==
In the autumn of 1941, she befriended Alexander Schmorell, Christoph Probst and Hans Scholl, and later Traute Lafrenz, Sophie Scholl and Willi Graf. After her husband was killed in Russia in May 1942, she began storing documents and a duplication apparatus in her flat in Neuhausen-Nymphenburg. In November 1942, she expanded the group's underground activities by joining forces with more powerful groups in Berlin such as the Kreisauer Kreis and the Christian resistance leader Dietrich Bonhoeffer through the help of Falk Harnack.

== Escape from Munich ==
On 2 March 1943 Ramdohr was arrested, but was released for lack of evidence. Later that month, Heinrich Himmler ordered her arrested again and sentenced to death, but she managed to escape. Ramdohr married German-born, Brazilian-raised medical student Carl Gebhard Fürst (1920–2010) in February 1944 in Munich, and escaped to her hometown of Aschersleben, using the name Lieselotte Fürst.

== Post-war era ==
Ramdohr survived the war and in 1948 fled with her four-year-old daughter, Doma-Ulrike, out of the Soviet occupation zone back to Bavaria, where she became a sports instructor in boarding schools in Upper Bavaria. In 1995, she published her memoirs "Friendships in the White Rose". Up until her death, she lived in a small town outside Munich. The BBC described her as a "spry 99-year-old".

== Documentaries ==
- In 1996, Bavarian Broadcasting, BR, televised a biography of Ramdohr as a part of its series Lebenslinien. The director was Hans-Sirks Lampe.
- In 1995, Geschichtswerkstatt Neuhausen televised interviews with Ramdohr in the documentary Davon haben wir nichts gewusst...Neuhausen unter der Nazi-Zeit.
- In 2008, interviews with Ramdohr were featured in the documentary Die Widerständigen – Zeugen der Weißen Rose.

== Works by Lilo Fürst-Ramdohr ==
- Freundschaften in der Weißen Rose. Verlag Geschichtswerkstatt Neuhausen, Munich 1995, ISBN 978-3-931231-00-2
- Die Weiße Rose (by Inge Scholl); p. 139. Frankfurt/M. 1994, ISBN 978-3-596-11802-1
- Seiltanz (Lyrics of the Munich Catacombe); Ed. Nanette Bald, Roman Kovar, Munich 1991. ISBN 978-3-925845-20-8
