= Hans Conrad Leipelt =

German resistance member

- Born: 18 July 1921; Vienna, First Austrian Republic
- Died: 29 January 1945 (aged 23); Stadelheim Prison, Nazi Germany

Hans Conrad Leipelt (18 July 1921 – 29 January 1945) was an Austrian member of the White Rose resistance group in Nazi Germany.

== Background ==
Leipelt was born in Vienna. His father, Konrad Leipelt, was a graduate in civil engineering, while his mother Katharina was a chemist from a Christian family with Jewish roots. In 1925, Hans father accepted the post of factory director of Tin Works in Wilhelmsburg, leading the family's migration to Hamburg. Due to the Jewish origins of Katharina Leipelt, the family suffered the repressions of the Nuremberg race laws from 1935.

Leipelt graduated high school with his Abitur in 1938, and then reported to the Reichsarbeitsdienst and the Wehrmacht. During the western campaign, he met Karl Ludwig Schneider, with whom he soon developed a strong friendship. In June 1940, he was decorated with the Iron Cross second class and the Tank Destruction Badge during the French campaign. He was later dishonourably discharged from the Wehrmacht because he was a Mischling first grade.

In the autumn of 1940, he began his chemistry studies at the University of Hamburg, but transferred in the 1941–1942 winter semester to the Ludwig-Maximilians-Universität München, as a student of Heinrich Otto Wieland. Leipelt was only allowed to study at the Ludwig-Maximilians-Universität München due to the influence of Professor Wieland who, as the winner of the Nobel Prize in Chemistry in 1927, had personal freedom to select his students. Via Schneider, Leipelt had also come into contact with Margaretha Rothe and Heinz Kucharski, who were similarly critical of the Nazi regime.

== Arrest and death ==
After the execution of Sophie and Hans Scholl and Christoph Probst on 22 February 1943, Leipelt received a copy of the sixth leaflet of the White Rose later in February. Together with Marie-Luise Jahn, he used a typewriter to make copies which he brought to Hamburg in April 1943 and distributed to his family and his friends. They added the addendum: "And their spirit lives on anyway!", in honour of their friends.

In late autumn 1943, Leipelt and Jahn were denounced for collecting money for the widow of the executed Professor Kurt Huber, and were arrested along with 19 other activists. Hans Leipelt was sentenced to death on 13 October 1944 in Donauwörth by the Volksgerichtshof accused of being a traitor for listening to foreign broadcasters, the destruction of military forces and harbouring "enemy favouritism". Jahn was given a 12-year labour prison sentence. Hans Leipelt was executed by guillotine on 29 January 1945 in Stadelheim Prison.

Leipelt's friend Karl Ludwig Schneider survived the war, and died in 1981.
