= White Rose Hamburg =

White Rose Hamburg was a resistance group working against National Socialism in Hamburg. Those involved did not call themselves that, and for the most part did not see themselves as resistance fighters. The term, used by researchers after 1945, encompasses several circles of friends and family, some of whom had been in opposition to National Socialism since 1936 and who, following the actions of the White Rose in Munich and their continuation, acted against the Nazi regime and the Second World War from 1942. Although many members belonged to an older generation, the group is classified as a youth and student opposition. There were isolated personal contacts with other resistance groups in Hamburg, but cooperation did not materialize.

Interest in the White Rose movement in Hamburg grew particularly after, in late 1942, Traute Lafrenz brought her friends in Hamburg copies of the third leaflet produced by the White Rose group of Munich.

Student members included Reinhold Meyer, Albert Suhr, Heinz Kucharski, Margaretha Rothe, Bruno Himpkamp, Rudolf Degkwitz (junior), Ursula de Boor, Hannelore Willbrandt, Karl Ludwig Schneider, Ilse Ledien, Eva von Dumreicher, Dorothea Zill, Apelles Sobeczko, and Maria Leipelt.

Between 1943 and 1944, the Gestapo arrested more than 30 people from this group and transferred them to prisons and concentration camps. Eight members of this resistance group were murdered by the end of the war or died after being mistreated.

== See also ==
Personen der Weißen Rose Hamburg
