= Anneliese Knoop-Graf =

German resistance member (1921–2009)

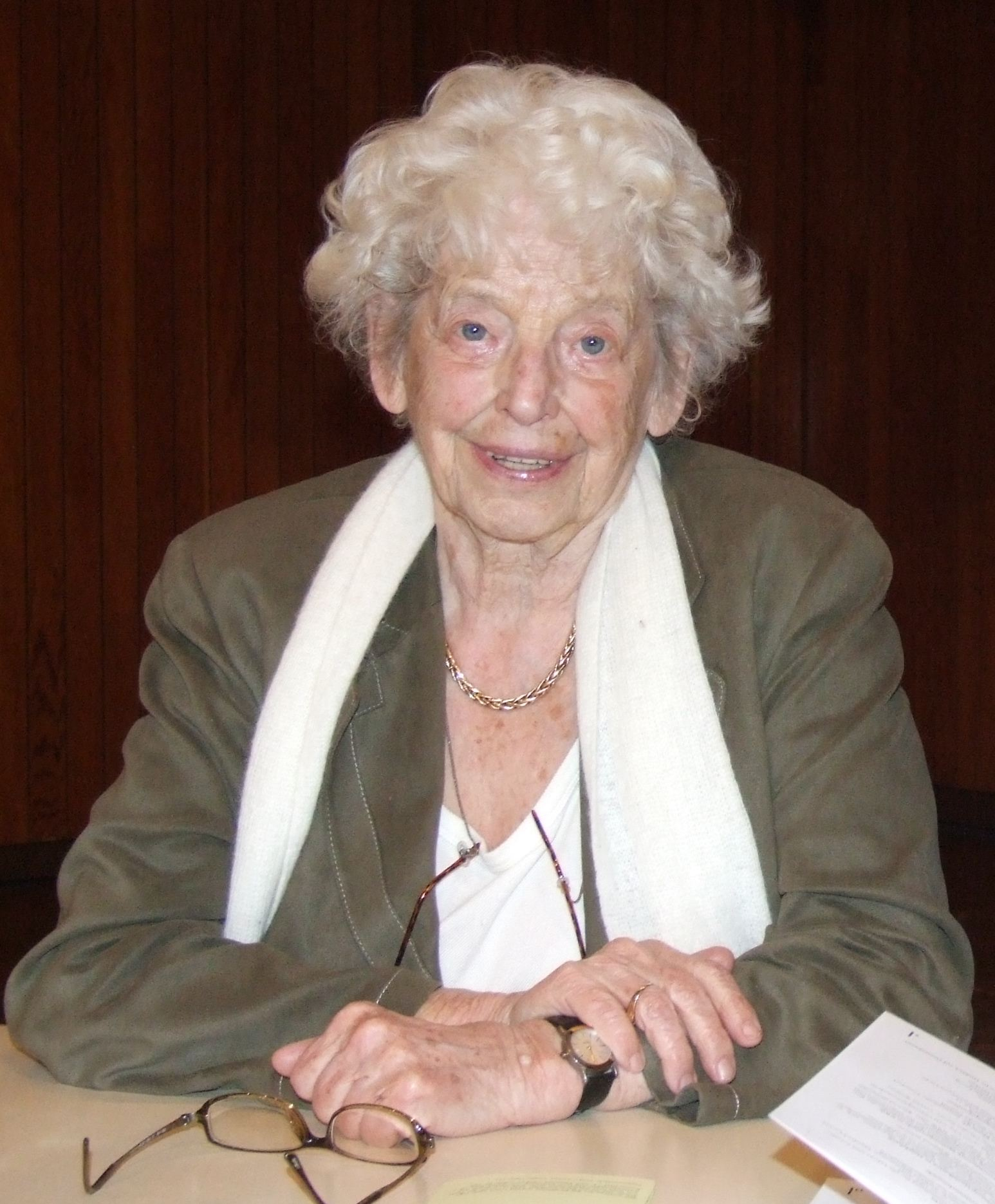
Knoop-Graf in 2007

Anneliese Knoop-Graf (30 January 1921 – 27 August 2009) was a German resistance member. The youngest sister of Willi Graf, who was one of the main members of the White Rose resistance group. In his last letter to her he tasked her to "keep a good memory of me". ("Behaltet mich in guter Errinerung") After his death Anneliese worked tirelessly to keep Willi’s story (and the stories of the other White Rose members) alive.

== White Rose ==
On 18 February 1943, Graf and her brother were captured by the Gestapo. Both were accused of being members of the White Rose. Willi was a core member, but he had never told Anneliese about the activities of the White Rose. Anneliese was released about four months after her arrest, while Willi was sentenced to death. In his last letter to Anneliese and his family, Willi asked them to, "Keep a good memory of me" and to "continue what we have started".

== Life and post-war work ==
After the war, Graf honored her brother's last wishes, becoming a speaker about the White Rose. She helped write multiple publications about the White Rose, including helping Inge Jens and Walter Jens publish a book of Willi Graf’s letters and diary titled, "Willi Graf: Briefe und Aufzeichnungen".

In 1987, Graf became the vice chairman of the White Rose foundation in Munich.

Graf died on 27 August 2009, aged 88.
