= Traute Lafrenz =

German anti-Nazi resistance activist (1919–2023)

- Born: 3 May 1919; Hamburg, Weimar Republic
- Died: 6 March 2023 (aged 103); Yonges Island, South Carolina, US
- Spouse: Vernon Page (m. 1947; died 1995)
- Children: 4

Traute Lafrenz Page (née Lafrenz; 3 May 1919 – 6 March 2023) was a German resistance activist who was a member of the White Rose anti-Nazi group during World War II.

== Early life ==
Lafrenz was born on 3 May 1919 in Hamburg to Carl and Hermine Lafrenz, a civil servant and a homemaker; she was the youngest of three sisters. Together with Heinz Kucharski, Lafrenz studied under Erna Stahl at the Lichtwarkschule, a liberal arts school in Hamburg. When coeducation was abolished in 1937, Lafrenz moved to a convent school, from which she and classmate Margaretha Rothe graduated in 1938. Together with Rothe, Lafrenz began to study medicine at the University of Hamburg in the summer semester of 1939. After the semester she worked in Pomerania, where she met Alexander Schmorell who had begun studying in the summer of 1939 at the Hamburg University Medical School but continued his studies from 1939 to 1940 at the Ludwig-Maximilians-Universität München.

== Involvement in the Weiße Rose ==
In May 1941, Lafrenz moved to Munich to study, and while there she got to know Hans Scholl and Christoph Probst. In her opposition to the Nazi regime, she found inspiration in the writings of Rudolf Steiner. She attended many talks and discussions of the White Rose group, including those with Kurt Huber. She and Hans Scholl, one of the group's leaders, were briefly romantically involved in summer 1941.

In late 1942, she brought the third White Rose flyer to Hamburg and distributed them with her former classmate Heinz Kucharski. When Hans and Sophie Scholl were arrested at the Ludwig-Maximilians-Universität München on 18 February 1943 for spreading anti-war leaflets, Lafrenz was also put under investigation by the Gestapo. She was arrested, along with Alexander Schmorell and Kurt Huber, on 15 March. During her interrogation by the Gestapo, Lafrenz succeeded in disguising the full extent of her involvement in the distribution of leaflets. As a result, she was sentenced to one year in prison on 19 April 1943, by the Volksgerichtshof (People's Court, first senate) for her role as a confidante. After her release, she was arrested and imprisoned once again by the Gestapo. Her trial was set for April 1945. Had it proceeded, she most likely would have been sentenced to death, but the Allies liberated the prison where she was held three days before her trial was supposed to commence, likely saving her life.

== After the war ==
In 1947, she immigrated to the United States, completing her medical studies at Saint Joseph's Hospital in San Francisco, California. In the United States, she met Vernon Page, an ophthalmologist. They married in 1948 and had four children together. Together they formed a medical practice in Hayfork, California. They were together until his death in 1995. She was an early practitioner of the anthroposophical-inspired holistic medical approach. After moving to Chicago, she served from 1972 to 1994 as head of Esperanza School, a private, therapeutic day school serving students with developmental disabilities between the ages of 5 and 21. She was involved in the anthroposophical movement in the United States for more than half a century. She retired and lived on Yonges Island near Meggett, South Carolina.

In 2019, she received the Order of Merit of the Federal Republic of Germany on her 100th birthday and was praised by German President Frank-Walter Steinmeier, who called Lafrenz a "hero of freedom and humanity".

On 6 March 2023, Lafrenz died on Yonges Island, South Carolina, at age 103, as the last living member of the White Rose group.
