= White Rose =

Resistance group in Nazi Germany

White Rose Resistance Group
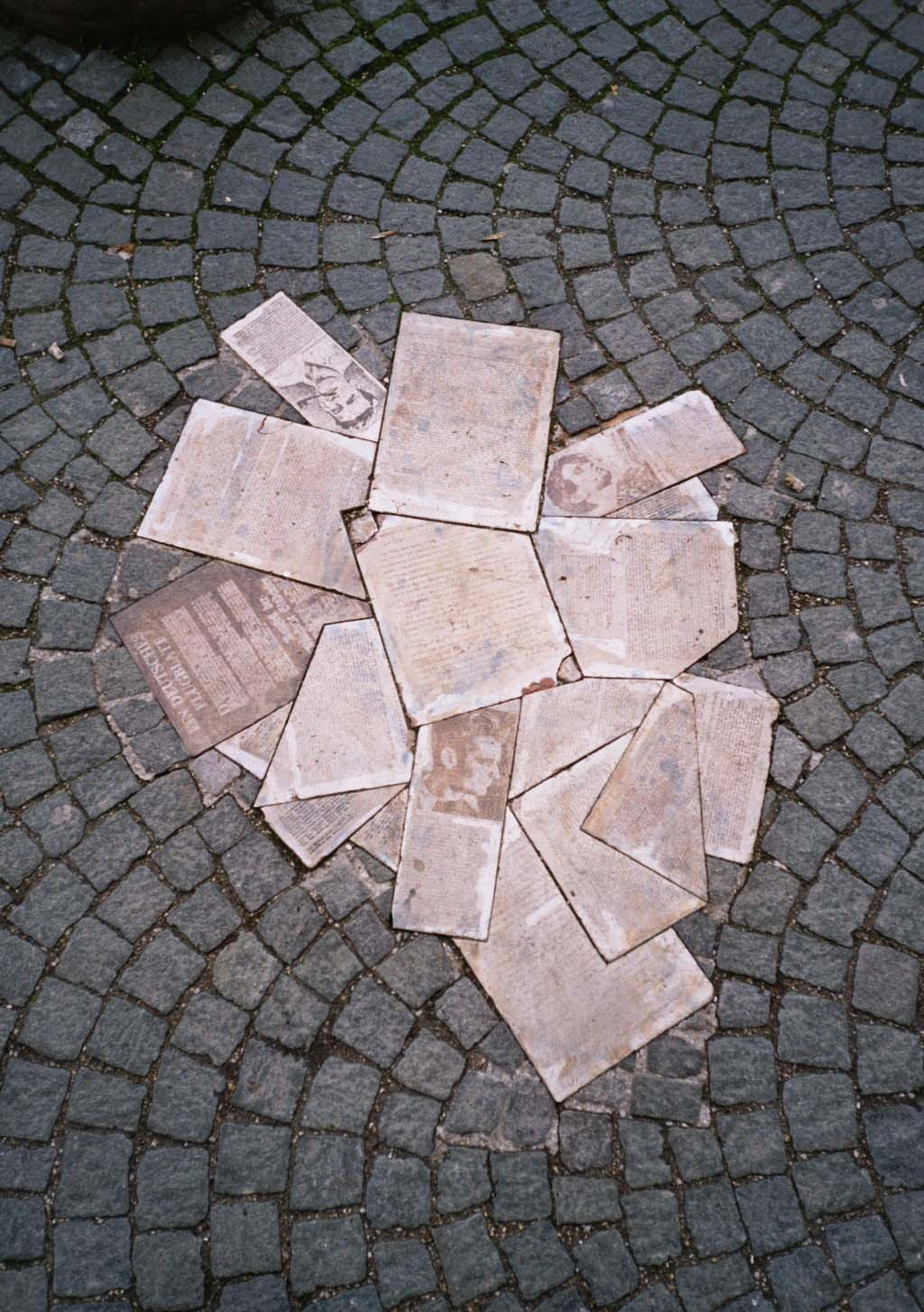
- Monument to the "Weiße Rose" in front of LMU Munich
- Founded: 27 June 1942; 84 years ago in Munich, Nazi Germany
- Founder: Hans Scholl; Alexander Schmorell
- Defunct: 1943

The White Rose (German: Weiße Rose, pronounced [ˈvaɪsə ˈʁoːzə]) was a non-violent, intellectual resistance group in Nazi Germany which was led by five students and one LMU Munich professor: Willi Graf, Kurt Huber, Christoph Probst, Alexander Schmorell, and Hans and Sophie Scholl. The group conducted an anonymous leaflet and graffiti campaign that called for active opposition to the Nazi regime, beginning in Munich on 27 June 1942. Their activities ended with the arrest of the core group by the Gestapo on 18 February 1943.

Graf, Huber, Probst, Schmorell, and the Scholl siblings, alongside other members and supporters of the group who carried on distributing the pamphlets, faced show trials by the Nazi People's Court (Volksgerichtshof); many of them were imprisoned and executed. Hans Scholl and Sophie Scholl, as well as Probst, were executed by guillotine four days after their arrest, on 22 February 1943. During the trial, Sophie interrupted the judge multiple times. No defendants were given any opportunity to speak.

The group wrote, printed, and initially distributed their pamphlets in the greater Munich region. Later on, secret carriers brought copies to other cities, mostly in the southern parts of Germany. In July 1943, Allied planes dropped their sixth and final leaflet over Germany with the headline The Manifesto of the Students of Munich. In total, the White Rose authored six leaflets, which were multiplied and spread, in a total of about 15,000 copies. They denounced the Nazi regime's crimes and oppression, and called for resistance. In their second leaflet, they denounced the persecution and mass murder of the Jews. By the time of their arrest, the members of the White Rose were just about to establish contacts with other German resistance groups like the Kreisau Circle or the Schulze-Boysen/Harnack group of the Red Orchestra. In the 21st century, the White Rose is well known both within Germany and worldwide.

== Members and supporters ==
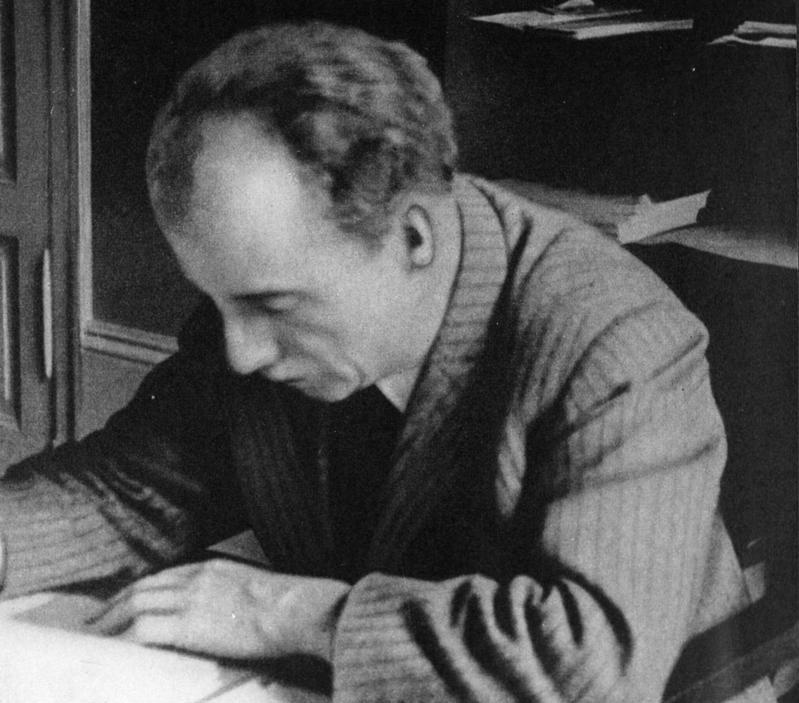
Kurt Huber, a core member of the White Rose Resistance Group

Students from LMU Munich comprised the core of the White Rose: Hans Scholl, Alexander Schmorell, Willi Graf, Christoph Probst, and Kurt Huber, a professor of philosophy and musicology. Hans's younger sister, Sophie later came to be a core member of the White Rose. They were supported by other people, mostly in their early twenties, including Otl Aicher, Willi Habermann ("Grogo"), Theodor Haecker, Anneliese Graf, Traute Lafrenz, Katharina Schüddekopf, Lieselotte "Lilo" Ramdohr, Jürgen Wittenstein, Falk Harnack, Marie-Luise Jahn, Wilhelm Geyer, Manfred Eickemeyer, Josef Söhngen, Heinrich Guter, Heinrich Bollinger, Wilhelm Bollinger, Helmut Bauer, Harald Dohrn, Hans Conrad Leipelt, Gisela Schertling, Rudi Alt, Michael Brink, Lilo Dreyfeldt, Josef Furtmeier, Günter Ammon, Fred Thieler, and Wolfgang Jaeger.

Wilhelm Geyer taught Alexander Schmorell how to make the tin templates used in the graffiti campaign. Eugen Grimminger of Stuttgart funded their operations. Grimminger was arrested on 2 March 1943, sentenced to ten years in a penal institution for high treason by the "People's Court" on 19 April 1943, and imprisoned in Ludwigsburg penal institution until April 1945. His wife Jenny was murdered in the Auschwitz-Birkenau extermination camp, presumably on 2 December 1943. Grimminger's secretary Tilly Hahn contributed her own funds to the cause, and acted as go-between for Grimminger and the group in Munich. She frequently carried supplies such as envelopes, paper, and an additional duplicating machine from Stuttgart to Munich. In addition, a group of students in the city of Ulm distributed a number of the group's leaflets and were arrested and tried with the group from Munich. Among this group were Sophie Scholl's childhood friend Susanne Hirzel and her teenage brother Hans Hirzel and Franz Josef Müller.

In Hamburg, a group of students including Reinhold Meyer, Albert Suhr, Heinz Kucharski, Margaretha Rothe, Bruno Himpkamp, Rudolf Degkwitz (junior), Ursula de Boor, Hannelore Willbrandt, Karl Ludwig Schneider, Ilse Ledien, Eva von Dumreicher, Dorothea Zill, Apelles Sobeczko, and Maria Liepelt formed the White Rose Hamburg resistance group against the National Socialist regime and distributed the group's leaflets.

== Historical and intellectual background ==
=== Germany in 1942 ===
White Rose survivor Jürgen Wittenstein described what it was like for ordinary Germans to live in Nazi Germany:

The government—or rather, the party—controlled everything: the news media, arms, police, the armed forces, the judiciary system, communications, travel, all levels of education from kindergarten to universities, all cultural and religious institutions. Political indoctrination started at a very early age, and continued by means of the Hitler Youth with the ultimate goal of complete mind control. Children were exhorted in school to denounce even their own parents for derogatory remarks about Hitler or Nazi ideology.

— George J. Wittenstein, M.D., "Memories of the White Rose", 1997

The activities of the White Rose started in the autumn of 1942. This was a time that was particularly critical for the Nazi regime; after initial victories in World War II, the German population became increasingly aware of the losses and damages of the war. In summer 1942, the German Army was preparing a new military campaign in the southern part of the Eastern front to regain the initiative after their earlier defeat close to Moscow. This German offensive was initially very successful, but it slowed in the autumn as Army Group South approached Stalingrad and the Caucasus region. During this time, the authors of the pamphlets could neither be discovered, nor could the campaign be stopped by the Nazi authorities. When Hans and Sophie Scholl were discovered and arrested whilst distributing leaflets at LMU Munich, the regime reacted brutally. The "Volksgerichtshof" was not bound by law, but its decisions were guided by Nazi ideology. Thus, its actions were declared unlawful in post-war Germany. The execution of the White Rose group members, among many others, is considered judicial murder today.

=== Social background ===
The members of the core group all shared an academic background as students at LMU Munich. The Scholl siblings, Christoph Probst, Willi Graf and Alexander Schmorell were all raised by independently thinking and wealthy parents. Alexander Schmorell was born in Russia, and his first language was Russian. After he and Hans Scholl had become friends at the university, Alexander invited Hans to his parents' home, where Hans also met Christoph Probst at the beginning of 1941. Alexander Schmorell and Christoph Probst had already been friends since their school days. As Christoph's father had been divorced and had married again to a Jewish wife, the effects of the Nazi Nuremberg Laws, and Nazi racial ideology had impacts on both Christoph's and Alexander's lives from early on.

=== German Youth Movement and Hitler Youth ===
The ideas and thoughts of the German Youth Movement, founded in 1896, had a major impact on the German youth at the beginning of the twentieth century. The movement aimed at providing free space to develop a healthy life. A common trait of the various organizations was a romantic longing for a pristine state of things, and a return to older cultural traditions, with a strong emphasis on independent, non-conformist thinking. They propagated a return to nature, confraternity and shared adventures. The Deutsche Jungenschaft vom 1 November 1929 (abbreviated as "d.j.1.11.") was part of this youth movement, founded by Eberhard Koebel in 1929. Christoph Probst was a member of the German Youth Movement, and Willi Graf was a member of Neudeutschland ("New Germany"), and the Grauer Orden ("Grey Convent"), which were illegal Catholic youth organizations.

The Nazi Party's youth organizations took over some of the elements of the Youth Movement, and engaged their members in activities similar to the adventures of the Boy Scouts, but also subjected them to ideological indoctrination. Some, but not all, of the White Rose members had enthusiastically joined the youth organizations of the Nazi party: Hans Scholl had joined the Hitler Youth, and Sophie Scholl was a member of the Bund Deutscher Mädel. Membership in both party youth organizations was compulsory for young Germans, although a few—such as Willi Graf, Otl Aicher, and Heinz Brenner—refused to join. Sophie and Hans' sister Inge Scholl reported about the initial enthusiasm of the young people for the Nazi youth organization, to their parents' dismay:

But there was something else that drew us with mysterious power and swept us along: the closed ranks of marching youth with banners waving, eyes fixed straight ahead, keeping time to drumbeat and song. Was not this sense of fellowship overpowering? It is not surprising that all of us, Hans and Sophie and the others, joined the Hitler Youth? We entered into it with body and soul, and we could not understand why our father did not approve, why he was not happy and proud. On the contrary, he was quite displeased with us.

— Inge Scholl, The White Rose

Youth organizations other than those led by the Nazi party were dissolved and officially forbidden in 1936. Both Hans Scholl and Willi Graf were arrested in 1937–38 because of their membership in forbidden Youth Movement organizations. Hans Scholl had joined the Deutsche Jungenschaft 1. 11. in 1934, when he and other Hitler Youth members in Ulm considered membership in this group and the Hitler Youth to be compatible. Hans Scholl was also accused of transgressing the German anti-homosexuality law, because of a same-sex teen relationship dating back to 1934–1935, when Hans was only 16 years old. The argument was built partially on the work of Eckard Holler, a sociologist specializing in the German Youth Movement, as well as on the Gestapo interrogation transcripts from the 1937–38 arrest, and with reference to historian George Mosse's discussion of the homoerotic aspects of the German "Bündische Jugend" Youth Movement. As Mosse indicated, idealized romantic attachments among male youths were not uncommon in Germany, especially among members of the "Bündische Jugend" associations. It was argued that the experience of being persecuted may have led both Hans and Sophie to identify with the victims of the Nazi state, providing another explanation for why Hans and Sophie Scholl made their way from ardent "Hitler Youth" leaders to passionate opponents of the Nazi regime.

=== Religion ===
The White Rose group was motivated by ethical, moral, and religious considerations. They supported and took in individuals of all backgrounds, and it did not depend on race, sex, religion, or age. They came from various religious backgrounds. Willi Graf and Katharina Schüddekopf were devout Catholics. Alexander Schmorell was an Eastern Orthodox Christian. Traute Lafrenz adhered to the concepts of anthroposophy, while Eugen Grimminger considered himself a Buddhist. Christoph Probst was baptized a Catholic only shortly before his execution. His father Hermann was nominally a Catholic, but also a private scholar of Eastern thought and wisdom. In their diaries and letters to friends, both Scholl siblings wrote about their reading of Christian scholars including Augustine of Hippo's Confessions and Etienne Gilson, whose work on Medieval philosophy they discussed amongst other philosophical works within their network of friends. The Scholls read sermons by John Henry Newman, and Sophie gave two volumes of Newman's sermons to her boyfriend, Fritz Hartnagel, when he was assigned to the Eastern Front; he wrote to her: "[W]e know by whom we are created, and that we stand in a relationship of moral obligation to our creator. Conscience gives us the capacity to distinguish between good and evil." This is a paraphrase of Newman's sermon, "The Testimony of Conscience".

=== Mentors and role models ===
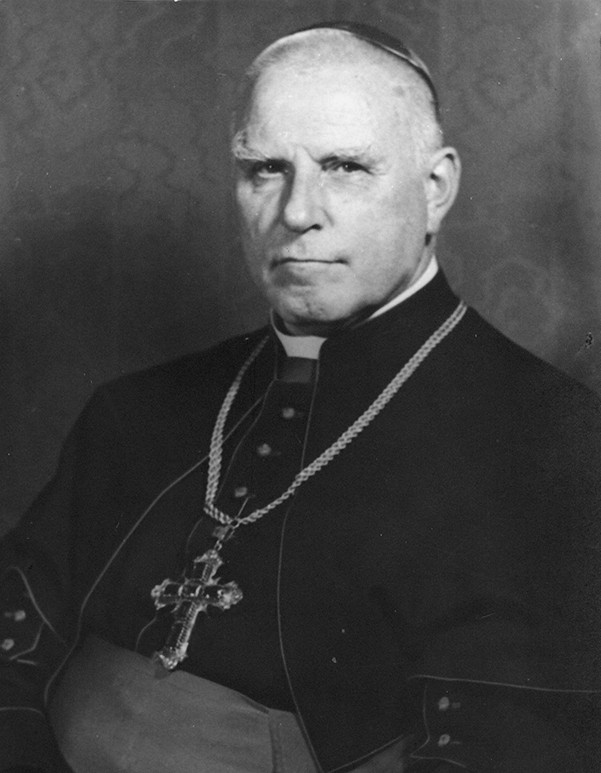
Clemens August Graf von Galen

In 1941, Hans Scholl read a copy of a sermon by an outspoken critic of the Nazi regime, Catholic Bishop August von Galen, decrying the euthanasia policies expressed in Action T4, and extended that same year to the Nazi concentration camps by Action 14f13, which the Nazis maintained would protect the German gene pool. Horrified by the Nazi policies, Sophie obtained permission to reprint the sermon and distribute it at LMU Munich.

In 1940, Otl Aicher had met Carl Muth, the founder of the Catholic magazine Hochland. Otl in turn introduced Hans Scholl to Muth in 1941. In his letters to Muth, Hans wrote about his growing attraction to the Catholic Christian faith. Both Hans and Sophie Scholl were influenced by Carl Muth whom they describe as deeply religious, and opposed to Nazism. He drew the Scholl siblings' attention to the persecution of the Jews, which he considered sinful and anti-Christian.

Both Sophie Scholl and Willi Graf attended some of Kurt Huber's lectures at LMU Munich. Kurt Huber was known amongst his students for the political innuendos which he used to include in his university lectures, by which he criticized Nazi ideology by talking about classical philosophers like Leibniz. He met Hans Scholl for the first time in June 1942, was admitted to the activities of the White Rose on 17 December 1942, and became their mentor and the main author of the sixth pamphlet.

=== Experience on the World War II Eastern Front ===
Hans Scholl, Alexander Schmorell, Christoph Probst, and Willi Graf were medical students. Their studies were regularly interrupted by terms of compulsory service as student soldiers in the Wehrmacht medical corps on the Eastern Front. Their experience during this time had a major impact on their thinking, and it also motivated their resistance, because it led to their disillusionment with the Nazi regime. Alexander Schmorell, who was born in Orenburg and raised by Russian nurses, spoke perfect Russian, which allowed him to have direct contact and communication with the local Russian population and their plight. This Russian insight proved invaluable during their time there, and he could convey to his fellow White Rose members what was not understood or even heard by other Germans coming from the Eastern front.

In summer 1942, Hans, Alexander, and Willi had to serve for three months on the Russian front alongside many other male medical students from LMU Munich. There, they observed the horrors of war, saw beatings and other mistreatment of Jews by the Germans, and heard about the persecution of the Jews from reliable sources. Some witnessed atrocities of the war on the battlefield and against civilian populations in the East. In a letter to his sister Anneliese, Willi Graf wrote: "I wish I had been spared the view of all this which I had to witness." Gradually, detachment gave way to the conviction that something had to be done. It was not enough to keep to oneself one's beliefs, and ethical standards, but the time had come to act.

The members of the White Rose were fully aware of the risks they incurred by their acts of resistance:

I knew what I took upon myself and I was prepared to lose my life by so doing.

— From the interrogation of Hans Scholl.

== Origin of the name ==
Under Gestapo interrogation, Hans Scholl gave several explanations for the origin of the name "The White Rose", and suggested he may have chosen it while he was under the emotional influence of a 19th-century poem with the same name by German poet Clemens Brentano. It has also been speculated that the name was taken from either the Cuban poet, Jose Marti's verse "Cultivo una rosa blanca" or the novel Die Weiße Rose (The White Rose) by B. Traven, which Hans Scholl and Alex Schmorell had both read. They also wrote that the symbol of the white rose was intended to represent purity and innocence in the face of evil.

If the White Rose was indeed named after Traven's novel, Hans Scholl's interrogation testimony may have been intentionally vague in order to protect Josef Soehngen, the anti-Nazi bookseller who had supplied this banned book. Söhngen had provided the White Rose members with a safe meeting place for exchange of information, and receipt of occasional financial contributions. Söhngen kept a stash of banned books hidden in his store, and had also hidden such books when they were being printed.

== Actions: the leaflets and graffiti ==
After their experiences at the Eastern Front, having learned about mass murder in Poland and the Soviet Union, Hans Scholl and Alexander Schmorell felt compelled to take action. With a portable Remington typewriter Schmorell borrowed from a friend, from late June until mid-July 1942, they wrote the first four leaflets. Quoting extensively from the Bible, Aristotle and Novalis, as well as Goethe and Schiller, the iconic poets of German bourgeoisie, they appealed to what they considered the German intelligentsia, believing that these people would be easily convinced by the same arguments that also motivated the authors themselves. These leaflets were left in telephone books in public phone booths, mailed to professors and students, and taken by courier to other universities for distribution. From 23 July to 30 October 1942, Graf, Scholl and Schmorell served again at the Soviet front, and activities ceased until their return. In autumn 1942, Sophie Scholl discovered that her brother Hans was one of the authors of the pamphlets, and joined the group. Shortly after, Willi Graf, and by the end of December 1942, Kurt Huber became members of the White Rose.

In January 1943, the fifth leaflet, "Aufruf an alle Deutsche!" ("Appeal to all Germans!") was produced in 6,000–9,000 copies, using a hand-operated duplicating machine. It was carried to other German cities between 27 and 29 January 1943 by the members and supporters of the group, and then mailed from there. Copies appeared in Saarbrücken, Stuttgart, Cologne, Vienna, Freiburg, Chemnitz, Hamburg, Innsbruck and Berlin. Sophie Scholl stated during her Gestapo interrogation that from summer 1942 on, the aim of the White Rose was to address a broader range of the population. Consequently, in the fifth leaflet, the name of the group was changed from White Rose to "German Resistance Movement", and also the style of writing became more polemic and less intellectual. The students had become convinced during their military service that the war was lost: "Hitler kann den Krieg nicht gewinnen, nur noch verlängern. – Hitler cannot win the war, he can only prolong it." They appealed to renounce "national socialist subhumanism", imperialism and Prussian militarism "for all time". The reader was urged to "Support the resistance movement!" in the struggle for "freedom of speech, freedom of religion and protection of the individual citizen from the arbitrary action of criminal dictator-states". These were the principles that would form "the foundations of a new Europe".

By the end of January 1943, the Battle of Stalingrad ended with the capitulation and near-total loss of the Wehrmacht's Sixth Army. In Stalingrad, World War II had taken a decisive turn, inspiring resistance movements throughout the European countries then occupied by Germany. It also had a devastating effect on German morale. On 13 January 1943, a student riot broke out at LMU Munich after a speech by Paul Giesler, the Nazi Gauleiter of Munich and Upper Bavaria, in which he had denounced male students not serving in the army as skulkers and had also made obscene remarks to female students. These events encouraged the members of the White Rose. When the defeat at Stalingrad was officially announced, they sent out their sixth—and last—leaflet. The tone of this writing, authored by Kurt Huber and revised by Hans Scholl and Alexander Schmorell, was more patriotic. Headed "Fellow students!" (the now-iconic Kommilitoninnen! Kommilitonen!), it announced that the "day of reckoning" had come for "the most contemptible tyrant our people has ever endured." "The dead of Stalingrad adjure us!" On 3, 8, and 15 February 1943, Alexander Schmorell, Hans Scholl, and Willi Graf used tin stencils to write slogans like "Down with Hitler" and "Freedom" on the walls of the university and other buildings in Munich.

Isn't it true that every honest German is ashamed of his government these days? Who among us has any conception of the dimensions of shame that will befall us and our children when one day the veil has fallen from our eyes and the most horrible of crimes—crimes that infinitely outdistance every human measure—reach the light of day?

— First leaflet of the White Rose

Since the conquest of Poland, 300,000 Jews have been murdered in this country in the most bestial way ... The German people slumber on in dull, stupid sleep and encourage the fascist criminals. Each wants to be exonerated of guilt, each one continues on his way with the most placid, calm conscience. But he cannot be exonerated; he is guilty, guilty, guilty!

— Second leaflet of the White Rose.

Why do you allow these men who are in power to rob you step by step, openly and in secret, of one domain of your rights after another, until one day nothing, nothing at all will be left but a mechanised state system presided over by criminals and drunks? Is your spirit already so crushed by abuse that you forget it is your right—or rather, your moral duty—to eliminate this system?

— Third leaflet of the White Rose

Es lebe die Freiheit! (Let Freedom live!)

— Hans Scholl's last words before his execution.

Months later, a smuggled copy of the sixth leaflet caught the attention of UK Prime Minister Winston Churchill, who had millions of copies printed and, in summer and fall of 1943, dropped over Germany by Royal Air Force pilots.

== Capture, Gestapo interrogation and trial ==
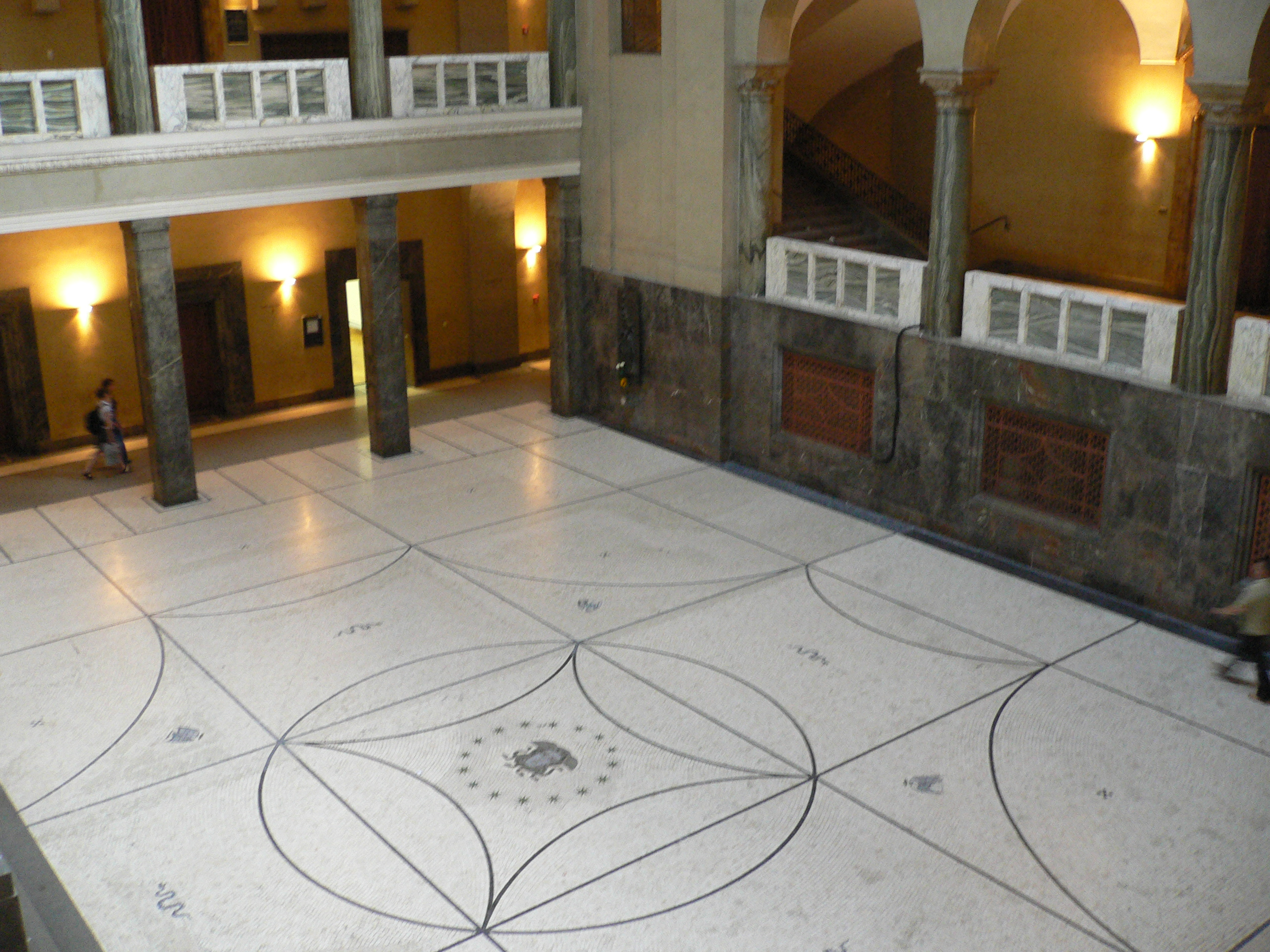
Atrium of LMU Munich's main building, where Hans and Sophie Scholl were arrested on 18 February 1943

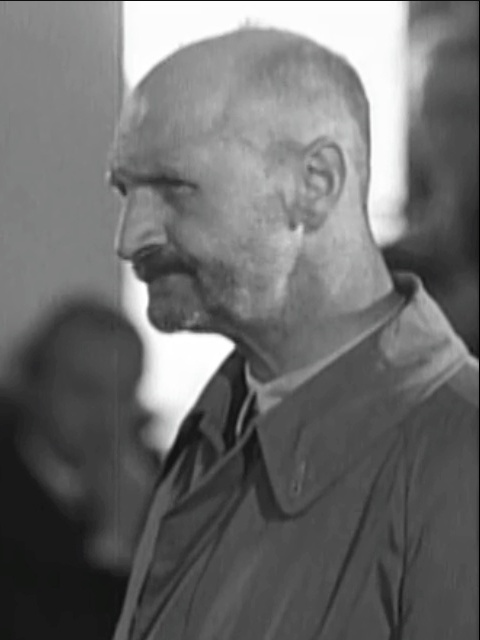
Jakob Schmid in February 1947

On 18 February 1943, the Scholls brought a suitcase full of leaflets to the university main building. They hurriedly dropped stacks of copies in the empty corridors for students to find when they left the lecture rooms. Leaving before the lectures had ended, the Scholls noticed that there were some left-over copies in the suitcase and decided to distribute them. Sophie flung the last remaining leaflets from the top floor down into the atrium. This spontaneous action was observed by the university maintenance man, Jakob Schmid, who called the Gestapo.

The university doors were locked, and the fate of brother and sister were sealed. Hans and Sophie Scholl were taken into Gestapo custody. A draft of a seventh pamphlet, written by Christoph Probst, was found in the possession of Hans Scholl at the time of his arrest by the Gestapo. While Sophie Scholl got rid of incriminating evidence before being taken into custody, Hans did try to destroy the draft of the last leaflet by tearing it apart and trying to swallow it. However, the Gestapo recovered enough of it and were able to match the handwriting with other writings from Probst, which they found when they searched Hans's apartment.

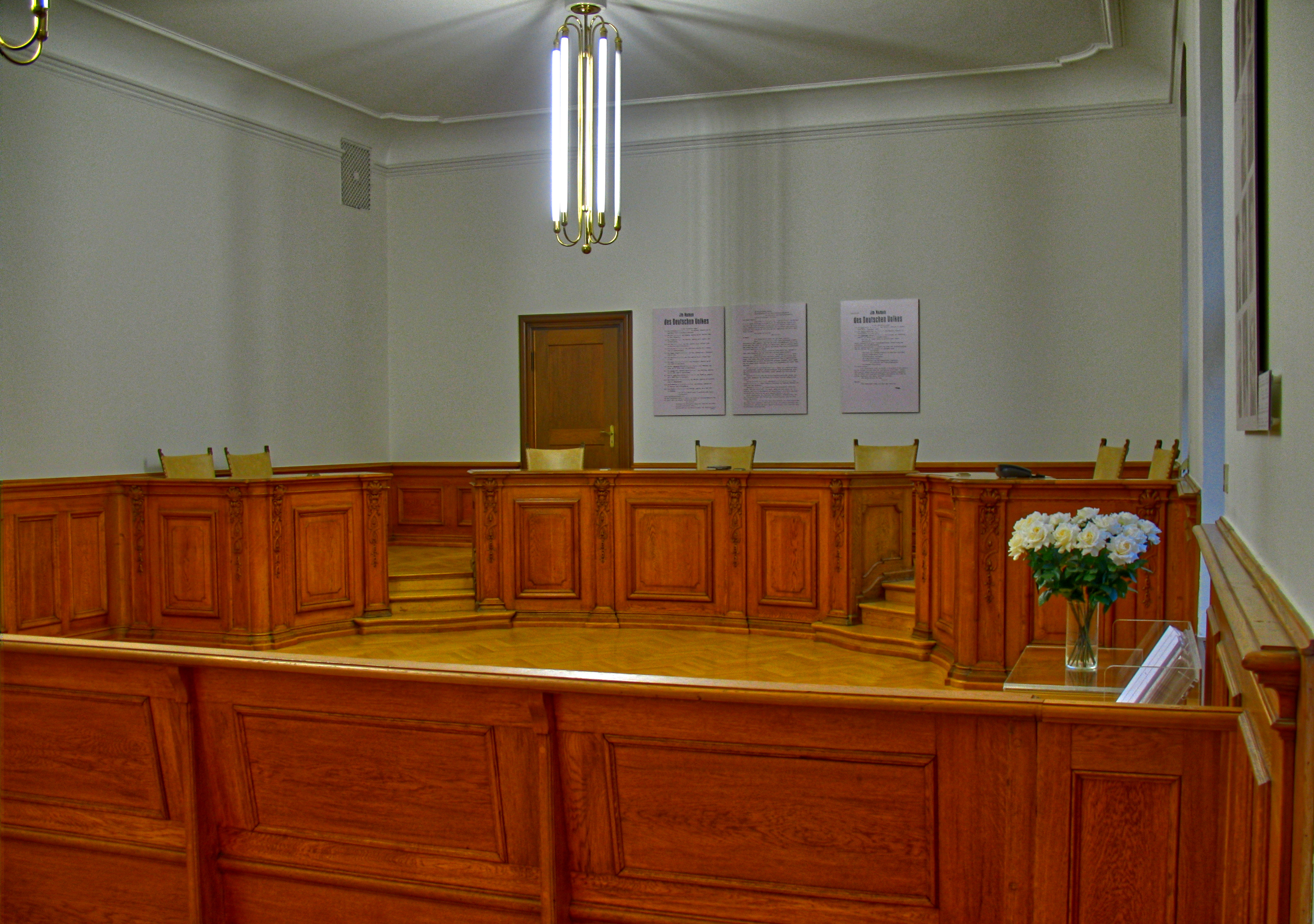
White Rose memorial at Room 253 of the Munich Court of Justice, where the first trial was held

Christoph was captured on 20 February. The main Gestapo interrogator was Robert Mohr, who initially thought Sophie was innocent. However, after Hans had confessed, Sophie assumed full responsibility in an attempt to protect other members of the White Rose. The Scholls and Probst were scheduled to stand trial before the Volksgerichtshof—the Nazi "People's Court" infamous for its unfair political trials, which more often than not ended with a death sentence—on 22 February 1943. They were found guilty of treason. Roland Freisler, head judge of the court, sentenced them to death. The three were executed the same day by guillotine at Stadelheim Prison. Sophie went under the guillotine first, followed by Hans and then Christoph. While Sophie and Christoph were silent as they died, Hans yelled "es lebe die Freiheit!" (long live freedom) as the blade fell.

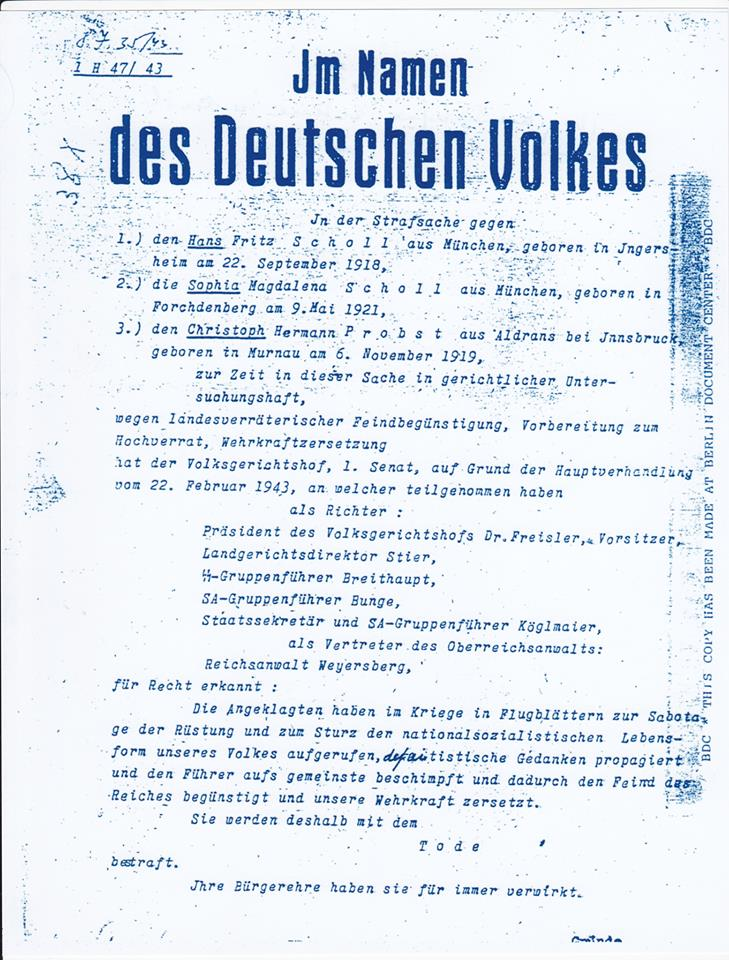
1943 German High Court decree (death sentence) against the White Rose members

IN THE NAME OF THE GERMAN PEOPLE
in the action against
1. Hans Fritz Scholl, Munich, born at Ingersheim, 22 September 1918,
2. Sophia Magdalena Scholl, Munich, born at Forchtenberg, 9 May 1921,
3. Christoph Hermann Probst, of Aldrans bei Innsbruck, born at Murnau, 6 November 1919,
now in investigative custody regarding treasonous assistance to the enemy, preparing to commit high treason, and weakening of the nation's armed security.
The People's Court first Senate, pursuant to the trial held on 22 February 1943, in which the officers were:
President of the People's Court Dr. Freisler, Presiding,
Director of the Regional Judiciary Stier,
SS Group Leader Breithaupt,
SA Group Leader Bunge,
State Secretary and SA Group Leader Koglmaier,
and representing the Attorney General to the Supreme Court of the Reich, Reich Attorney Weyersberg,
[We]find: That the accused have in time of war by means of leaflets called for the sabotage of the war effort and armaments and for the overthrow of the National Socialist way of life of our people, have propagated defeatist ideas, and have most vulgarly defamed the Führer, thereby giving aid to the enemy of the Reich and weakening the armed security of the nation.
On this account they are to be punished by death.
Their honor and rights as citizens are forfeited for all time.

— Translation made by Berlin Documents Center HQ US Army Berlin Command of 1943 Decree against the "White Rose" group.

Willi Graf had already been arrested on 18 February 1943; in his interrogations, which continued until his execution in October 1943, he successfully covered other members of the group. Alexander Schmorell was recognized, denounced and arrested on 24 February 1943, after his return to Munich following an unsuccessful effort to travel to Switzerland. Kurt Huber was taken into custody on 26 February, and only then did the Gestapo learn about his role within the White Rose group.

The second White Rose trial took place on 19 April 1943. Among those on trial were Hans Hirzel, Susanne Hirzel, Franz Josef Müller, Heinrich Guter, Eugen Grimminger, Otto Aicher, Theodor Haecker, Willi Graf, Anneliese Graf, Heinrich Bollinger, Helmut Bauer and Falk Harnack. At the last minute, the prosecutor added Traute Lafrenz, Gisela Schertling and Katharina Schüddekopf. Willi Graf, Kurt Huber, and Alexander Schmorell were sentenced to death. Eleven others were sentenced to prison, and Falk Harnack was acquitted of the accusations, which was unexpected, given that his brother and sister-in-law had been killed by the Nazis for subversive activities. Schmorell and Huber were executed on 13 July 1943. Willi Graf was kept in solitary confinement for about seven months. During that time, he was tortured in an attempt to make him give up other names of members of The White Rose. He never gave up any names, even when the Gestapo threatened to capture his family if he continued to withhold information. He was executed on 12 October 1943. On 29 January 1945, Hans Konrad Leipelt was executed. He had been sent down from Hamburg University in 1940 because of his Jewish ancestry, and had copied and further distributed the White Rose's pamphlets together with his girlfriend Marie-Luise Jahn. The pamphlets were now entitled "And their spirit lives on."

The third White Rose trial was scheduled for 20 April 1943, Hitler's birthday, which was a public holiday in Nazi Germany. Judge Freisler had intended to issue death sentences against Wilhelm Geyer, Harald Dohrn, Josef Söhngen and Manfred Eickemeyer. Because he did not want to issue too many death sentences in a single trial, he therefore wanted to postpone his judgment against those four until the next day. However, the evidence against them was lost, and the trial finally took place on 13 July 1943. In that trial, Gisela Schertling—who had betrayed most of the friends, even fringe members like Gerhard Feuerle—changed her mind and recanted her testimony against all of them. Since Freisler did not preside over the third trial, the judge acquitted for lack of evidence all but Söhngen, who was sentenced to a six months' term in prison. After her acquittal on 19 April, Traute Lafrenz was placed under arrest again. She spent the last year of the war in prison. Trials kept being postponed and moved to different locations because of Allied air raids. Her trial was finally set for April 1945, after which she probably would have been executed. Three days before the trial, however, the Allies liberated the town where she was held prisoner, thereby saving her life. The student members of the White Rose make up a few of the nearly 70 juveniles that were indicted for high treason by the People's Court from 1933 to 1945.

== Reactions in Germany and abroad during World War II ==
The hopes of the White Rose members that the defeat at Stalingrad would incite German opposition against the Nazi regime and the war effort did not come true. On the contrary, Nazi propaganda used the defeat to call on the German people to embrace "Total War". Coincidentally, on 18 February 1943, the same day that saw the arrests of Sophie and Hans Scholl and Willi Graf, Nazi propaganda minister Joseph Goebbels delivered his Sportpalast speech, and he was enthusiastically applauded by his audience. Shortly after the arrest of the Scholl siblings and Christoph Probst, newspapers published all-points bulletins in search of Alexander Schmorell. On 22 February 1943, the students of Munich were assembled, and officially protested against the "traitors" who came from within their ranks. Gestapo and Nazi jurisdiction documented in their files their view of the White Rose members as "traitors and defeatists". On 23 February, the official newspaper of the Nazi party (Völkischer Beobachter), as well as local newspapers in Munich, briefly reported about the capture and execution of some "degenerate rogues".

The network of friends and supporters proved to be too large, so that the rumors about the White Rose could not be suppressed any more by Nazi German officials. Further prosecutions took place until the end of World War II, and German newspapers continued to report, mostly in brief notes, that more people had been arrested and punished. On 15 March 1943, a report by the Sicherheitsdienst of the Schutzstaffel stated that rumors about the leaflets spread "considerable unrest" amongst the German population. The report expressed particular concern about the fact that leaflets were not handed in to the Nazi authorities by their finders as promptly as they used to be in the past.

On 18 April 1943, The New York Times mentioned the student opposition in Munich. The paper also published articles on the first White Rose trials on 29 March 1943 and 25 April 1943. Though they did not correctly record all of the information about the resistance, the trials, and the execution, they were the first acknowledgement of the White Rose in the United States. On 27 June 1943, the German author and Nobel prize winner Thomas Mann, in his monthly anti-Nazi broadcasts by the BBC called Deutsche Hörer! ("German Listeners!") highly praised the White Rose members' courage. Soviet Army propaganda issued a leaflet, wrongly attributed by later researchers to the National Committee for a Free Germany, in honour of the White Rose's fight for freedom.

The text of the sixth leaflet of the White Rose was smuggled out of Germany through Scandinavia to the United Kingdom by the German lawyer and member of the Kreisau Circle, Helmuth James Graf von Moltke. In summer and fall of 1943, copies were dropped over Germany by Allied planes, retitled "The Manifesto of the Students of Munich". Thus, the activities of the White Rose became widely known in World War II Germany, but, like other attempts at resistance, did not succeed in provoking widespread active opposition against the totalitarian regime within the German population. However, it continued to be an important inspiration for acts of individual or small-scale resistance throughout the final years of the war.

== Research history ==
For many years the primary sources for research were limited to those provided by White Rose members and their supporters. These included Inge Scholl's 1952 commemorative book The White Rose, surviving copies of the pamphlets, the letters and diaries of Sophie and Hans Scholl, Willi Graf, and other people with direct knowledge of the group's activities. With the end of Communism in the Soviet Union and the German Democratic Republic in the early 1990s, the Gestapo interrogation protocols and other documents from Nazi authorities became publicly available. The interrogation protocols were part of the Volksgerichtshof documents, and were confiscated by the Soviet Red Army, and brought to Moscow. Here, they were kept secret in a special archive. After the foundation of the German Democratic Republic, the major part of the Nazi documents were handed over to the East German government, except the documents concerning Alexander Schmorell, who was born in Russia. The documents were distributed between the Central Archive of the Communist Socialist Unity Party of Germany and the archive of the Ministry for State Security. With the German reunification, the documents were transferred to the Federal Archive of Germany in Berlin, and finally published. The documents concerning Alexander Schmorell still remain in the State Military Archive of Russia, but have been fully transcribed and published in a German/Russian edition.

== Memorials and legacy ==
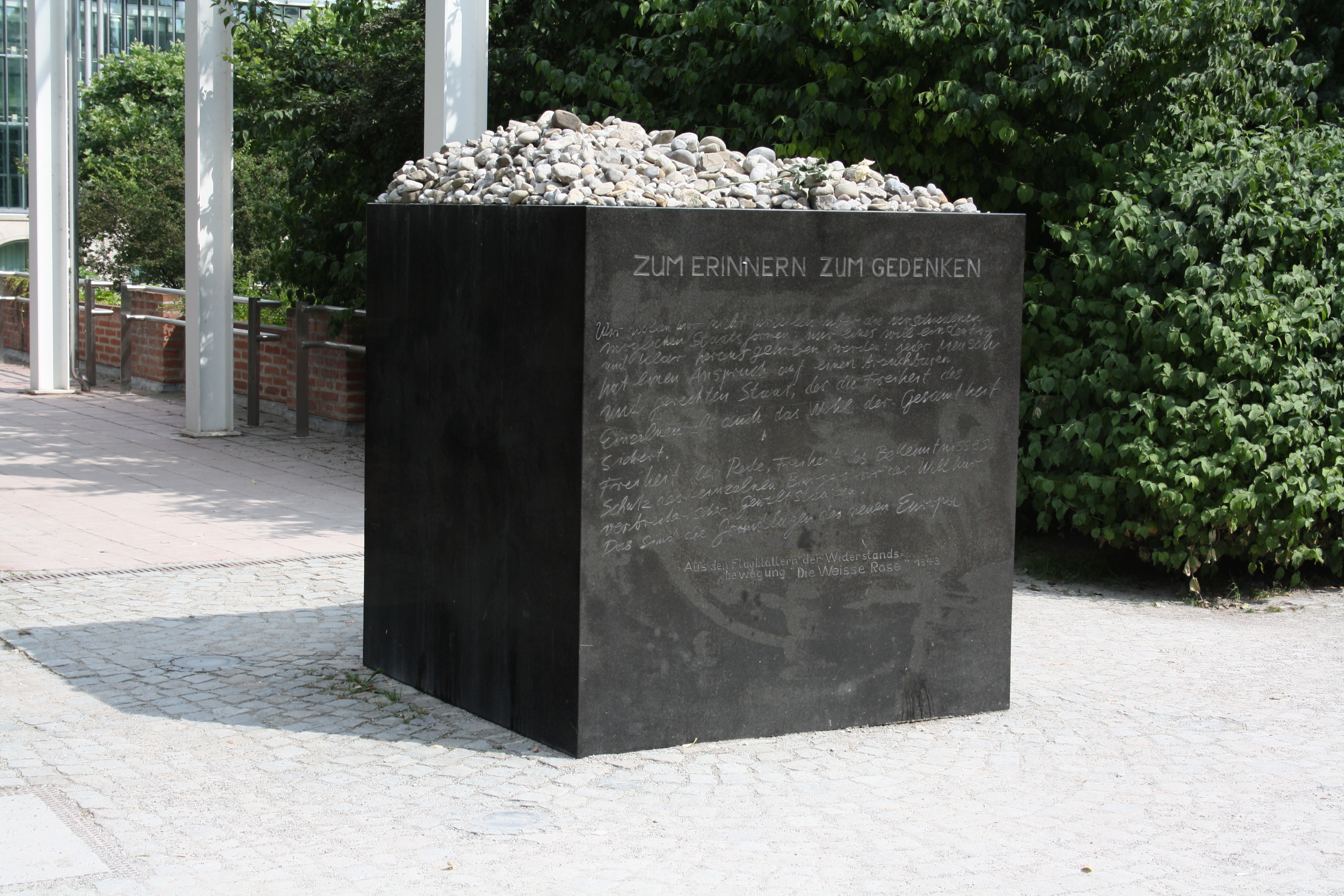
A black granite memorial to the White Rose Movement in the Hofgarten in Munich

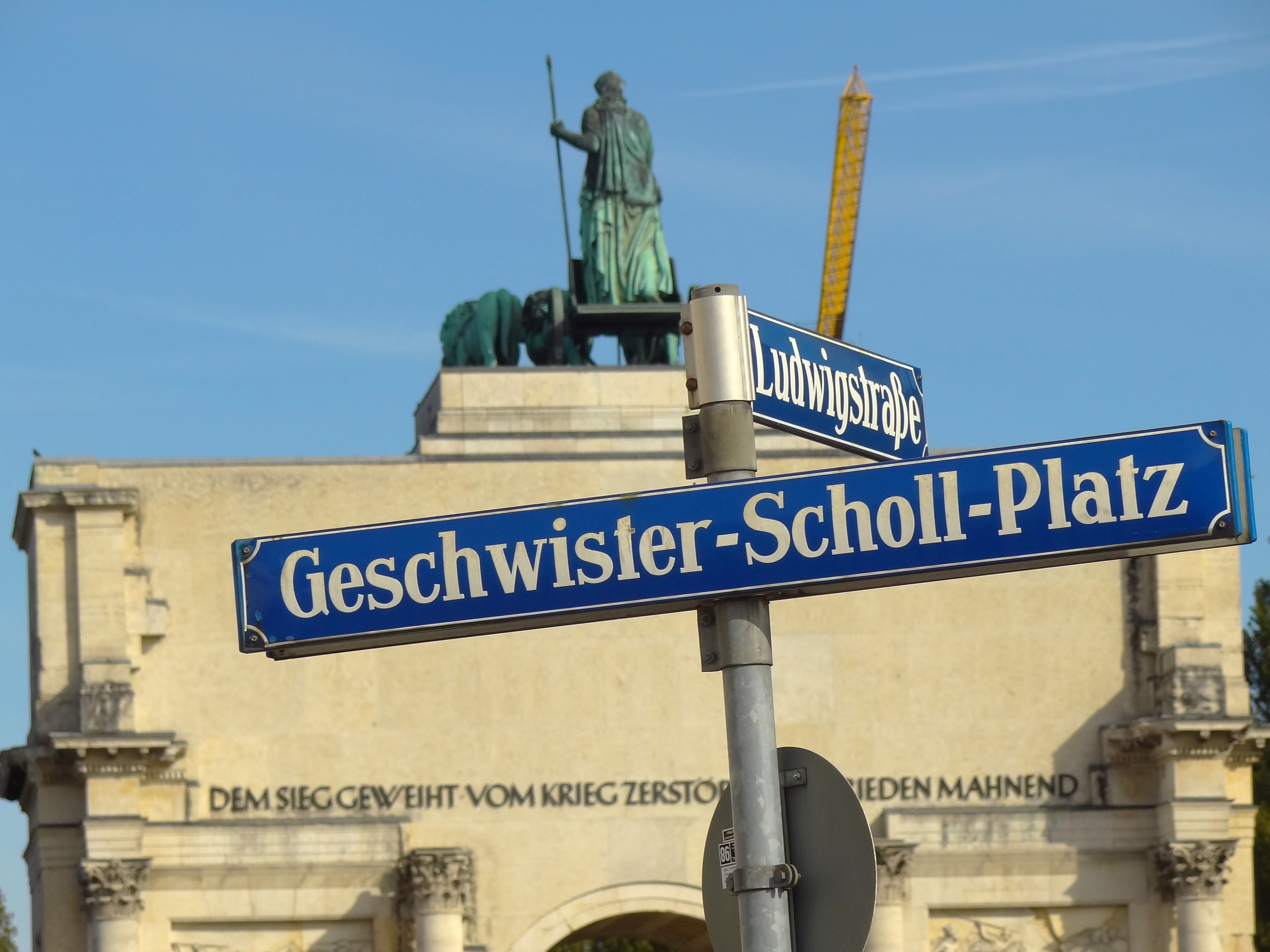
"Geschwister-Scholl-Platz" – Scholl Siblings Square, outside LMU Munich's main building, Munich, Germany

With the fall of Nazi Germany, the White Rose came to represent opposition to tyranny in the German psyche and was lauded for acting without interest in personal power or self-aggrandizement. Their story became so well known that the composer Carl Orff claimed, falsely by some accounts, to his Allied interrogators that he was a founding member of the White Rose and was released. He was personally acquainted with Huber, but there is no evidence that Orff was ever involved in the movement. On 5 February 2012, Alexander Schmorell was canonized as a New Martyr by the Orthodox Church.

The square where the central hall of LMU Munich is located has been named "Geschwister-Scholl-Platz" after Hans and Sophie Scholl; the square opposite to it is "Professor-Huber-Platz". Two large fountains are in front of the university, one on either side of Ludwigstraße. The fountain in front of the university is dedicated to Hans and Sophie Scholl. The other, across the street, is dedicated to Professor Huber. Many schools, streets, and other places across Germany are named in memory of the members of the White Rose.

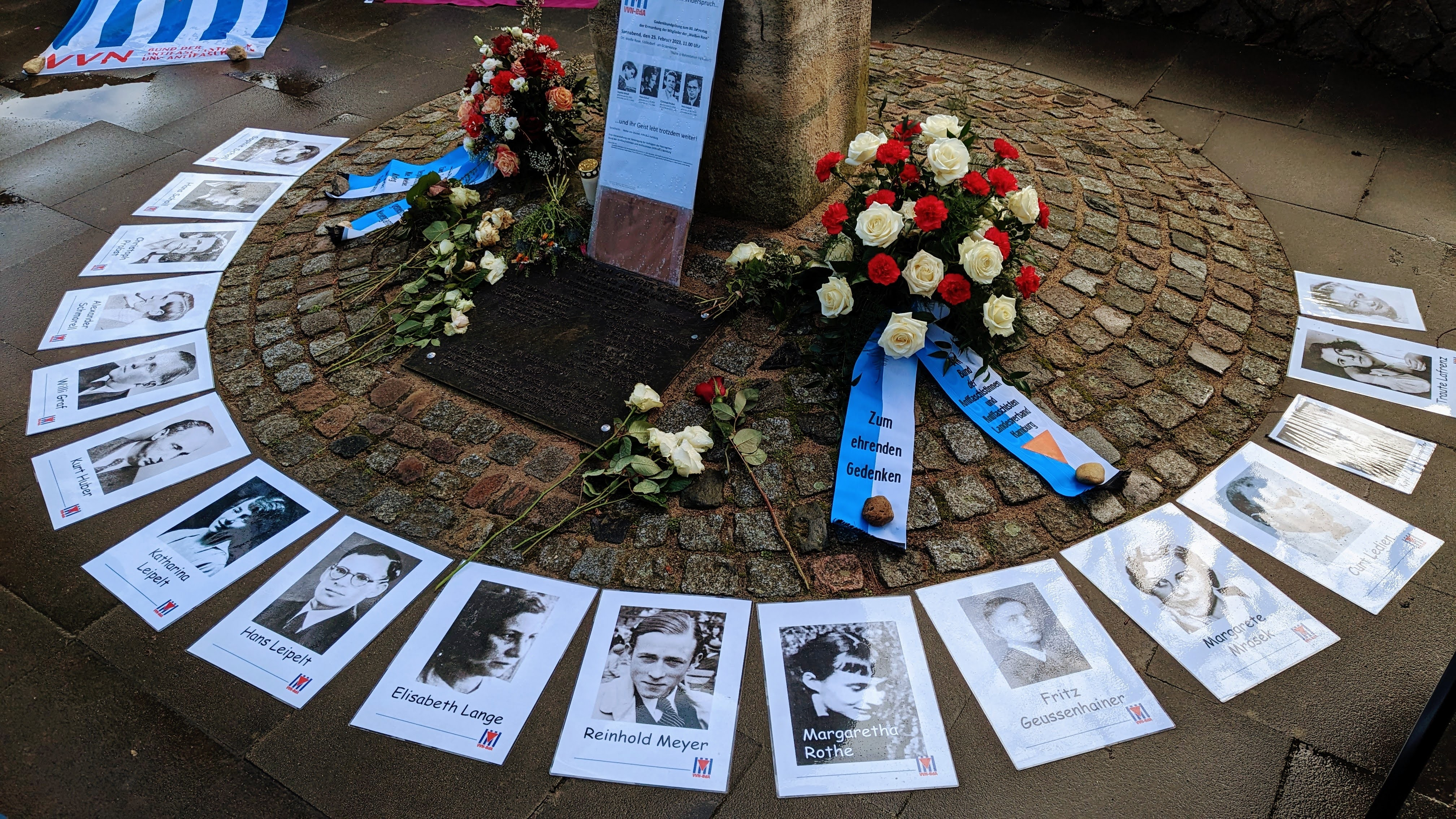
White Rose (Hamburg branch) memorial event Hamburg 2023

In Paris, a high school of the 17th arrondissement (collège La Rose Blanche), is named after the White Rose, and a public park pays homage to Hans and Sophie Scholl. One of Germany's leading literary prizes is called the Geschwister-Scholl-Preis (the "Scholl Siblings" prize). Asteroid 7571 Weisse Rose is named after the group. The Audimax of the Bundeswehr Medical Academy in Munich was named after Hans Scholl in 2012. The Joint Medical Service of the Bundeswehr, named barracks north of Munich after Christoph Probst at his 100th birthday in 2019.

The last surviving member of the group was Traute Lafrenz. She was 100 years old on 3 May 2019 and was awarded the Order of Merit of the Federal Republic of Germany on that same date for her work as part of the White Rose. She died on 6 March 2023. In May 2021, Germany issued a stamp to commemorate the 100th anniversary of Sophie Scholl's birthday.

== White Rose appropriation ==
In 2021, a conspiracy theorist group known as the "White Rose" appropriated the name of the White Rose anti-Nazi resistance group to make an analogy between the original White Rose's non-violent resistance against Nazism and the non-violent supposed "resistance" by the conspiracy theorists against COVID-19 lockdowns and other measures by national governments intended to stop the virus during the COVID-19 pandemic in the early 2020s, which the conspiracy theorists falsely claim was the secret establishment of a worldwide totalitarian Nazi-style government.

The methods of the White Rose conspiracy theorists, which reflected COVID-19 misinformation, were somewhat similar in that the conspiracy theorists printed stickers asking for resistance against anti-Covid measures alongside the "White Rose" name with the address of their Telegram group, then posted the stickers in public places. The use of the Internet meant that the conspiracy theorists spread misinformation and gained members across the world unlike the original White Rose who were limited to Germany. Apart from the name, there was no connection between the original White Rose and the conspiracy theorists who took their name.

== See also ==
- Austrian resistance to Nazi Germany
- German resistance to Nazism
- Catholic resistance to Nazi Germany
- Jewish resistance in German-occupied Europe
- Cologne Circle
- List of German Righteous Among the Nations
