= Willi Graf =

German resistance member (1918–1943)

Servant of God Willi Graf

Martyr
- Born: Wilhelm Graf; 2 January 1918; Kuchenheim, Euskirchen, Germany
- Died: 12 October 1943 (aged 25); Stadelheim Prison, Giesing, Munich, Germany

Wilhelm "Willi" Graf (2 January 1918 – 12 October 1943) was a German member of the White Rose resistance group in Nazi Germany. The Catholic Church in Germany included Graf in their list of martyrs of the 20th century. In 2017, his cause for beatification was opened and he was given the title Servant of God.

== Early life ==
Willi Graf was born in Kuchenheim near Euskirchen. In 1922, his family moved to Saarbrücken, where his father ran a wine wholesaler and managed the Johannishof, the second largest banquet hall in the city. Graf attended school at the Ludwigs gymnasium. It was not long before he joined, at the age of eleven, the Bund Neudeutschland, a Catholic youth movement for young men in schools of higher learning, which was banned after Hitler and the Nazis came to power in 1933. In 1934, Graf joined the Grauer Orden ("Grey Order"), another Catholic movement which became known for its anti-Nazi rhetoric. It, too, was banned and for this reason, it formed many splinter youth groups.

Graf showed conviction in his beliefs from a young age. Although compulsory at the time, he refused to associate with the Hitler Youth, even when he was threatened with becoming ineligible to go to University unless he joined the Hitler Youth. While other future members of the White Rose initially embraced the Hitler Youth, Graf never did so. Moreover, in his address book he crossed out the names of friends who had joined the Hitler Youth, refusing to associate with them. In 1935, at the age of 17, Graf and a few friends marched in an annual May Day parade. The parade was dominated by swastikas, brown-shirted Hitler Youth troops marching in formation, and "Sieg Heils." However, Graf and his friends marched under their tattered school flag, making great effort to stand out from their peers. They did not don any swastikas, or participate in any of the "Sieg Heil" salutes.

While his parents never placed much emphasis on literature and written works (the only books the family owned were religious books), Graf was a voracious reader. Serious and intelligently minded, he enjoyed reading Christian works, with one of his favorite Christian authors being Romano Guardini, one of the leading figures of the liturgical revival of the Catholic Church in Germany. He conducted an in-depth study of Christian authors in his teenage years, with a special focus on works by Romano Guardini. He also enjoyed reading poetry, foreign works, and works banned by the Nazis. Throughout his life, books were a lifeline for him: When he was serving on the Eastern Front, he would write to his friends to see if they could send him more books. In the last year of his life alone he read forty books.

== Arrest ==
After his Abitur in 1937, Graf did his six-month Reichsarbeitsdienst and afterwards began his medical studies at the University of Bonn. In 1938, he was arrested along with other members of the Grauer Orden and charged by a court in Mannheim with illegal youth league activities–the Bünde having been banned–in relation with his unlawful field trips, camping excursions and other meetings with the Grauer Orden. The charges were later dismissed as part of a general amnesty declared to celebrate the Anschluss. The detention had lasted three weeks. His time in jail did not weaken his decision to participate in anti-Nazi activities or organizations.

== Studies at the University of Bonn ==
After his release, Graf was allowed to return to the University of Bonn to continue his medical studies. While there, Graf was required to report for military duty in August 1939. The next month, September 1939, the war officially began. At this time, the University of Bonn was closed for the course of the war. Graf had chosen the University of Bonn because his aunt and uncle lived in Bonn and offered to let him live with them, as well as the fact that many of his friends (including his then girlfriend Marianne Thoeren) went to that university. After it closed, Graf transferred to the Ludwig-Maximilians-Universität München (LMU). He had completed four semesters at the University of Bonn.

== German army ==
In January 1940, Graf was officially drafted as a Sanitätssoldat (medic). After completing preliminary medical training, he was shipped out to France in September 1940. After serving in France for a few months, he was then transferred to a heavy artillery unit in Belgium. In March 1940, he was transferred to the Eastern Front, having medic duties in both Serbia and Poland. While in Poland in June 1941, he saw the Warsaw Ghetto. This experience caused him to write "Terrible!" in his diary entry of 6 June 1941. He might have written more, but unfortunately during this time of upheaval, he was worried what would happen if others read his diary. On 22 June 1941, Germany declared war on Russia. Soon after, Graf was transferred to Russia, where he would stay until he was allowed to return to Munich to continue his studies in April 1942. During these deployments, he saw terrible things that traumatized him and began to destroy his faith in humanity. As he later wrote to a friend while stationed in Russia, "A war has started that I can't compare to anything else, even here in this land that has always been a mystery to us." In his army medic files it was observed that his care of the ill was "exemplary". Dr. Webel, the Chief Medical Officer, said that Graf "showed himself to be an intrepid medic who never thought about his own safety." Graf was granted the Iron Cross, 2nd class with swords, for his actions. In April 1942, Graf was temporarily relieved of duty and sent to the Ludwig-Maximilians-Universität München to continue his studies. While there, he met Hans Scholl and Alexander Schmorell.

== Work in the White Rose Summer 1942 ==
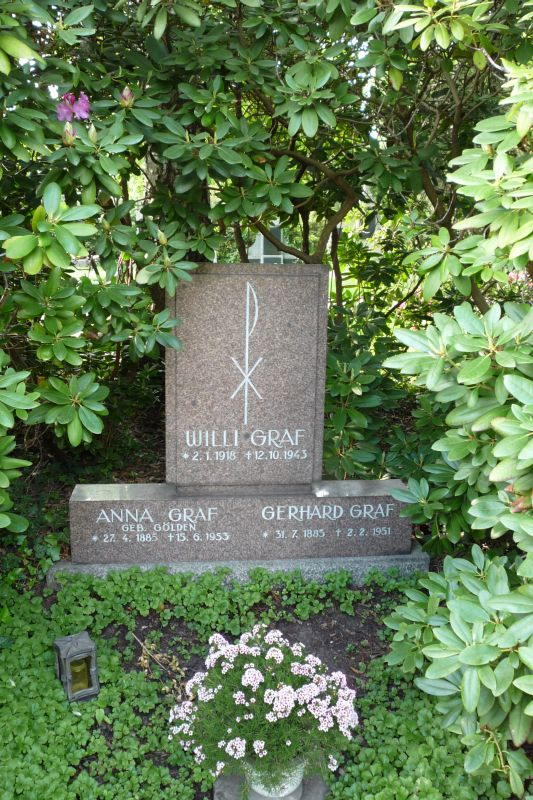
Grave in the St. Johann Cemetery in Saarbrücken

Graf met Hans Scholl and Alexander Schmorell soon after transferring back to Munich. He was introduced to them by Christoph Probst, who took part in fencing with Graf. When Scholl met Graf, he remarked, "he is one of us." Around this time, Graf began to take part in discussions with Scholl, Schmorell, Probst, and their friends.

The activities of the White Rose first started in the June 1942. After their experiences at the Eastern Front, having learned about mass murder in Poland and the Soviet Union, Scholl and Schmorell felt compelled to take action. From end of June until mid of July 1942, they wrote the first four leaflets. Quoting extensively from the Bible, Aristotle and Novalis, as well as Goethe and Schiller, the iconic poets of German bourgeoisie, they appealed to what they considered the German intelligentsia, believing that these people would be easily convinced by the same arguments that also motivated the authors themselves. These leaflets were left in telephone books in public phone booths, mailed to professors and students, and taken by courier to other universities for distribution. Graf was not part of the group at first. He was officially brought in to the group on 10 July 1942.

== Deployment to Russia, July–November 1942 ==
A few weeks later, Scholl, Schmorell, and Graf were deployed to the Russian Front over the Summer of 1942. Graf had already been deployed to Russia, but it was Scholl and Schmorell's first time being deployed on the Eastern Front. On the train ride to Russia, the train passed through Poland. While there, Graf, Scholl, and Schmorell saw the Evacuation of the Warsaw Ghetto.

In Russia, Scholl, Schmorell, and Graf would sneak away at night and go to the homes of Russian natives. Schmorell, who had been born in Russia and spoke fluent Russian, introduced Graf and Scholl to Russian culture. Graf and his friends were allowed to return to Munich in November 1942.

== Work in the White Rose, November 1942–January 1943 ==
Soon after returning to Munich in November 1942, Graf travelled to Bonn, officially to arrange a fencing tournament, unofficially to ask Marianne Thoeren to marry him. While there, she told him that she was already engaged to another man. After some deliberation, he decided to still be friends with her. After this rejection, he threw himself back into the White Rose activities with vigor. During this time, two more leaflets were written, and efforts were made to expand the reaches of the White Rose group. Graf was a recruiter for the group: from 20 to 24 January 1943, he traveled to Cologne, Bonn, Saarbrücken, Freiburg, and Ulm, armed with copies of the fifth leaflet and a hectograph machine. With the end goal in mind to recruit some of his Graue Orden friends, he asks forty people to join. Only four of his friends agreed to help. Two of the friends who agreed to help, brothers Willi and Heinz Bollinger, forged travel papers for him. While they agreed with the decision to resist National Socialism, they told Graf that they believed that he and his friends had only a 2% chance of success.

== Graffiti campaigns of February 1943 ==
On 3 February 1943, the news of the defeat of Battle of Stalingrad was broadcast to the German public. Later that day, Graf, Schmorell, and Scholl snuck out at night and graffitied public buildings with slogans such as "down with Hitler" and "Hitler, the mass murderer". During the campaign, Schmorell would hold up the stencils while Graf painted the slogans on with tar paint. Scholl stood guard, armed with a pistol in case anyone walked in on their graffiting. On 8 February 1943, Graf and Scholl graffitied again. This time, they used green oil-based paint. On 15 February 1943, Scholl, Schmorell, and Graf snuck out and graffitied the Feldherrnhalle, then a monument to the Nazis who were killed during the failed Beer Hall Putsch. The graffiti campaigns put the Gestapo on high alert.

== Capture and execution ==
On 18 February 1943, Sophie and Hans Scholl went to the Ludwig-Maximilians-Universität München to leave flyers out for the students to read. They were seen by Jakob Schmid, a custodian at the university who was also a Gestapo informer. At around midnight on 18 February, Gestapo agents arrested Graf when he returned to his apartment after meeting with his cousins. When he was captured, he asked to be allowed to go to his bedroom and change into his Wehrmacht uniform. The agents agreed to his request. While changing, he was able to hide his diary under his many books. The diary was later found by his sister Anneliese, who was also arrested by the Gestapo at the same time. She was released a few months later.

Graf's trial was set for 19 April 1943. At his trial, Graf was sentenced to death at the Volksgerichtshof for high treason, Wehrkraftzersetzung (undermining the troops' spirit), and furthering the enemy's cause. Graf was beheaded on 12 October 1943 at Stadelheim Prison in Munich, after around six months of solitary confinement. During this six-month period the Gestapo used psychological torture to try to extract information from Graf about other White Rose members and other anti-Nazi movements. Graf never gave up any names, taking on blame for the White Rose activities in order to protect others who had not yet been arrested.

In his last letter to his family, he wrote:

On this day I'm leaving this life and entering eternity. What hurts me most of all is that I am causing such pain to those of you who go on living. But strength and comfort you'll find with God and that is what I am praying for till the last moment. I know that it will be harder for you than for me. I ask you, Father and Mother, from the bottom of my heart, to forgive me for the anguish and the disappointment I've brought you. I have often regretted what I've done to you, especially here in prison. Forgive me and always pray for me! Hold on to the good memories.... I could never say to you while alive how much I loved you, but now in the last hours I want to tell you, unfortunately only on this dry paper, that I love all of you deeply and that I have respected you. For everything that you gave me and everything you made possible for me with your care and love. Hold each other and stand together with love and trust.... God's blessing on us, in Him we are and we live.... I am, with love always, your Willi.

== Legacy ==
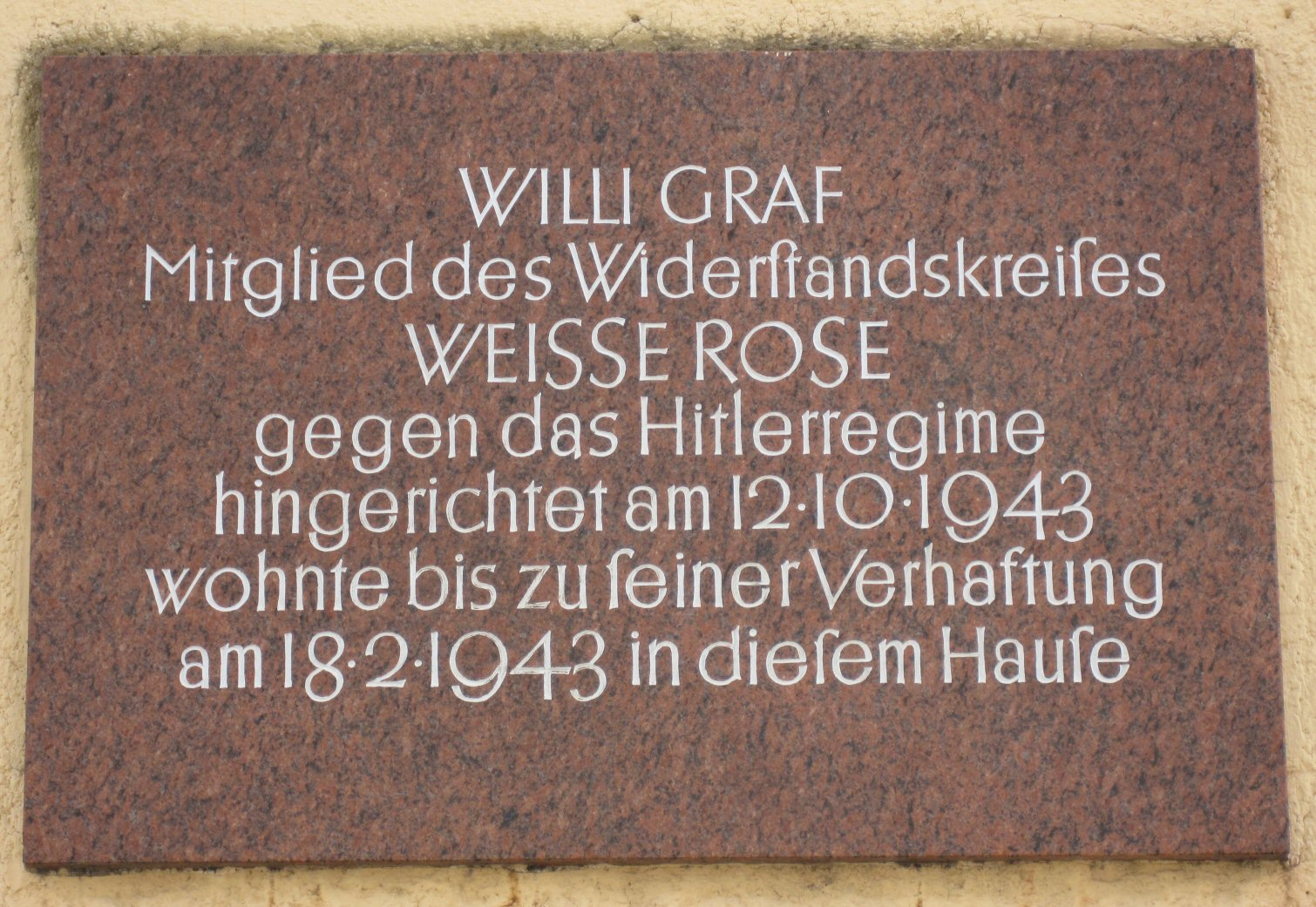
Graf memorial, Mandlstrasse, Munich

In 1946, his remains were transferred to the St. Johann Cemetery in Saarbrücken. Eight schools in Germany have been named after him, among them the Willi-Graf-Gymnasium in Munich and Saarbrücken-St. Johann; a student residence in Munich also honours Graf by bearing his name. Graf's diary from 1942 to 1943, as well as his letters from that time, were published in 1988 under the title: Willi Graf:Briefe und Aufzeichnungen. In 2003, Graf was posthumously awarded the status of honorary citizen of Saarbrücken.

The Catholic Church in Germany included Graf in their list of martyrs of the 20th century. In 2017, the Archbishop of Munich and Freising, Cardinal Reinhard Marx, initiated the first step in the preliminary process of beatification, an investigation in which theologians and historians will analyse the life and writings of Graf. In October 2020, the Archdiocese of Munich and Freising made it known that they are in the middle of preparing the process of beatification for Willi Graf.

=== In film ===
There have been two films about the White Rose that portray Graf. In the 1982 film Die Weisse Rose, Graf was portrayed by Ulrich Tulkur. In the film Sophie Scholl: The Final Days (2005), Graf was portrayed by Maximilian Brückner.

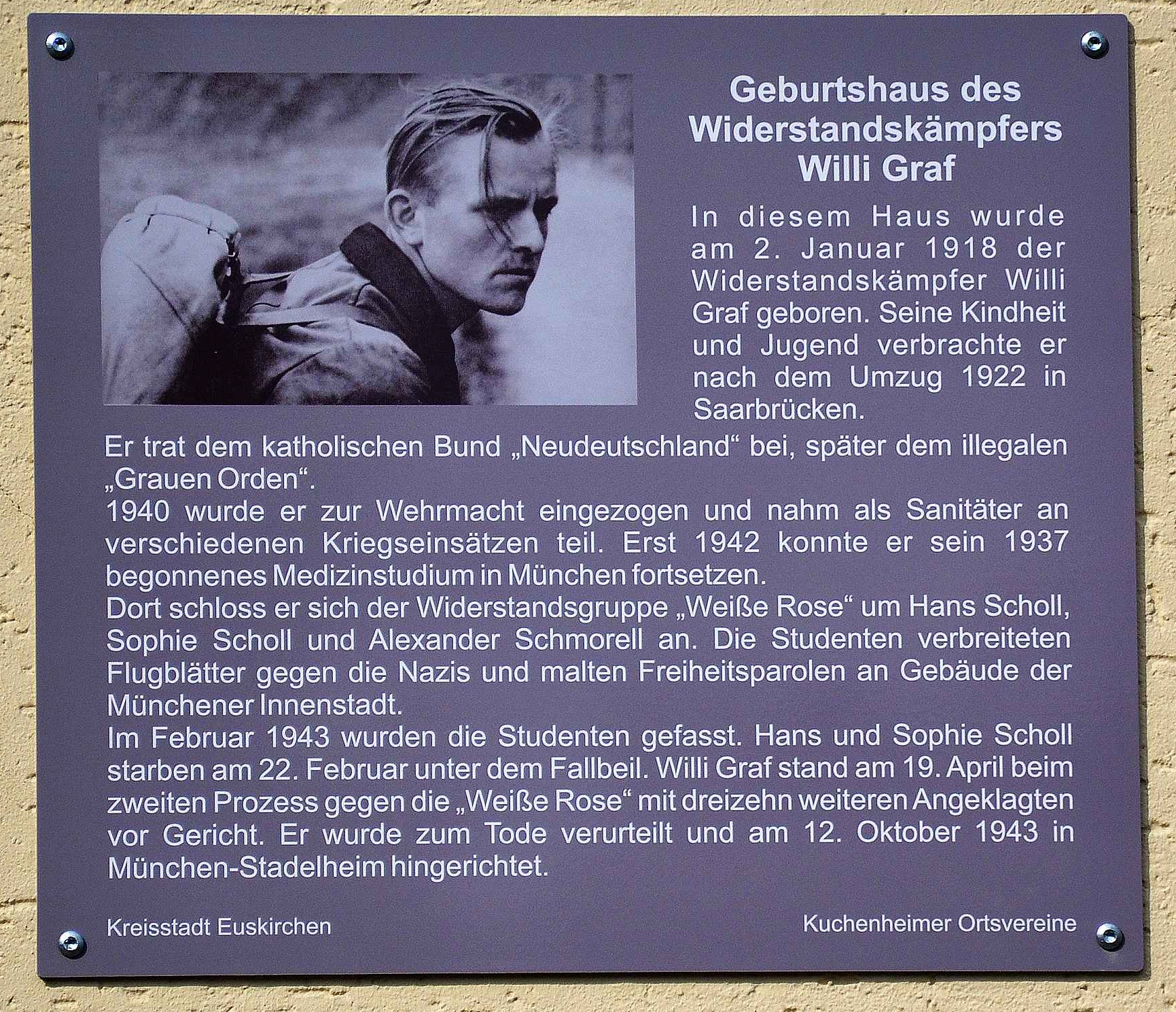
Commemorative plaque at the birthplace of Willi Graf in Kuchenheim
