= Kurt Huber =

German professor and member of the White Rose Nazi resistance group (1893–1943)

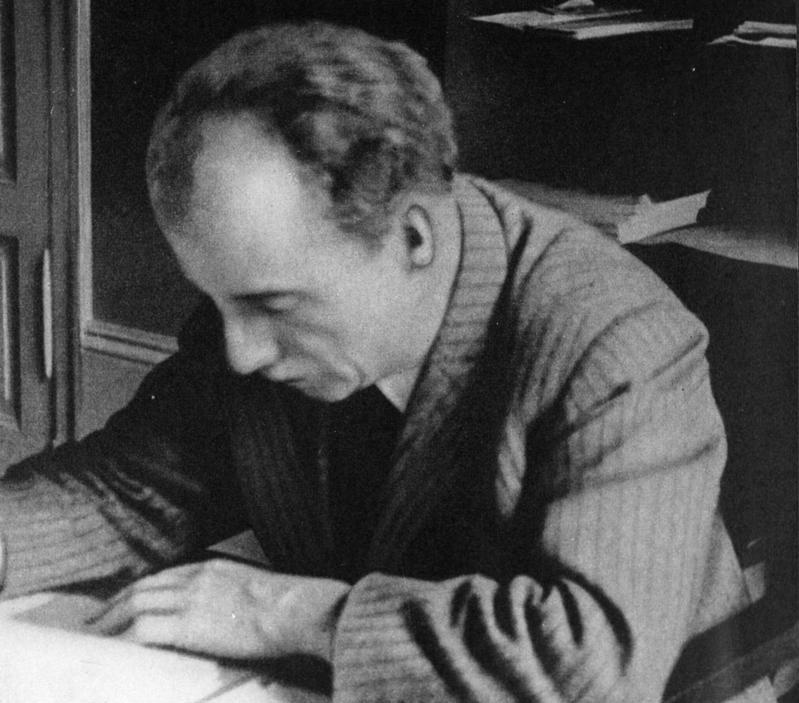
- Born: 24 October 1893; Chur, Switzerland
- Died: 13 July 1943 (aged 49); Munich, Nazi Germany
- Occupation: Professor at the Ludwig-Maximilians-Universität München
- Known for: White Rose movement

Kurt Huber (24 October 1893 – 13 July 1943) was a German university professor, philosopher, and resistance fighter with the anti-Nazi group White Rose. For his involvement, he was imprisoned and guillotined.

== Early life ==
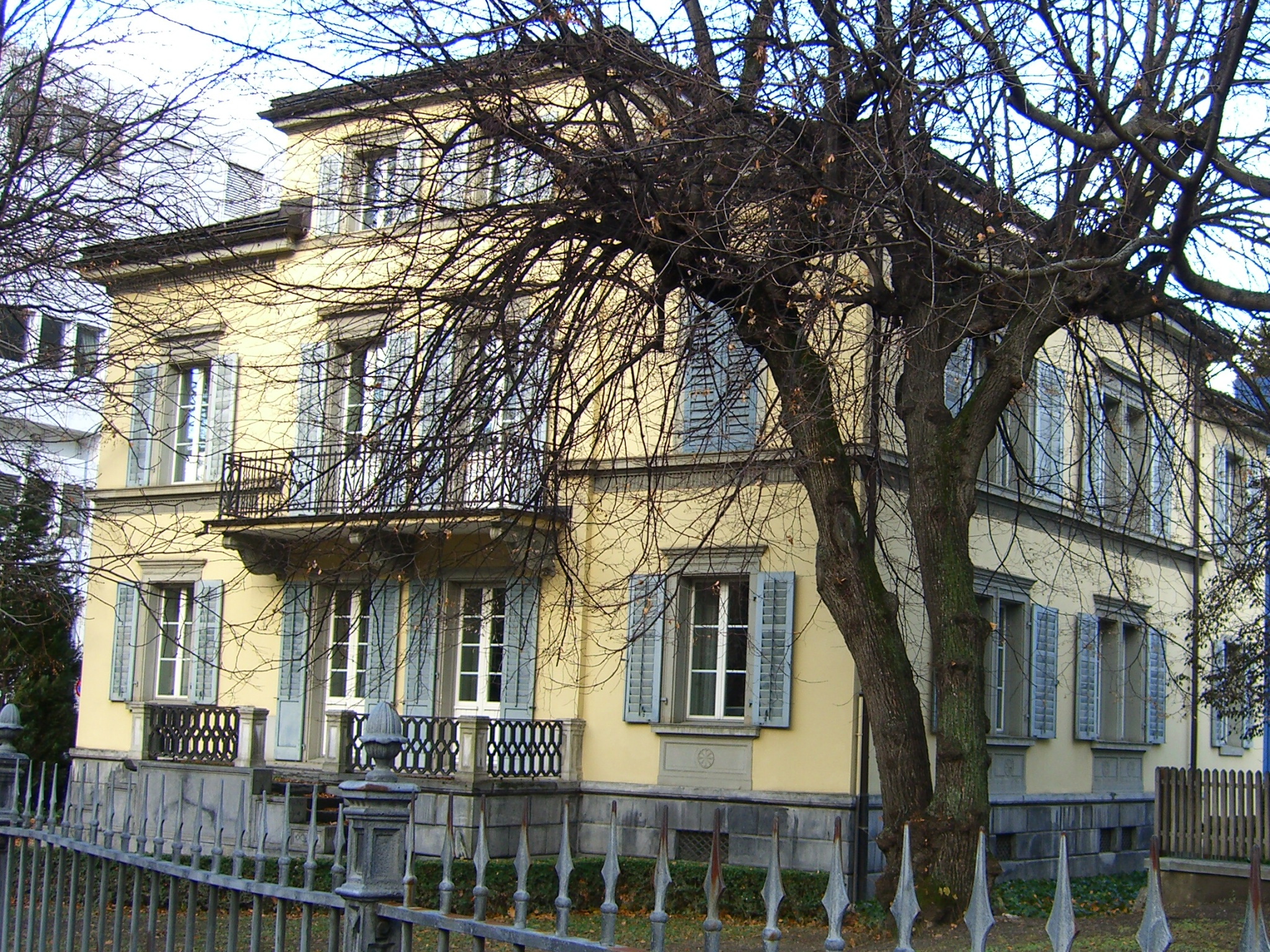
Huber's birthplace in Chur

Huber was born in Chur, Switzerland, to German parents. He was raised in Stuttgart and later, after his father's death, in Munich. As a young child, he had suffered acute diphtheria. His larynx had been slit to save his life, but he never completely recovered. For the rest of his life, he walked with a heavy limp and had trouble speaking. Regardless of this, Huber, who showed an aptitude for such subjects as music, philosophy and psychology, became a professor of psychology and music in 1926 at the Ludwig-Maximilians-Universität München. Huber never let his disabilities stop him. During his teaching, he was known for teaching classes that did not push Nazi ideology, which made him a favourite with the university students.

== Resistance ==
Huber was appalled by the rise of the Nazi Party and decided that Adolf Hitler and his government had to be removed from power. He came into contact with the White Rose movement through some students who attended his lectures, Hans Scholl and Alexander Schmorell. In January 1943, Huber helped edit the fifth White Rose leaflet. He wrote the White Rose's sixth leaflet calling for an end to National Socialism. It was the last leaflet to be published (Christoph Probst wrote an unpublished seventh leaflet). The sixth leaflet was published in its entirety, except for a paragraph praising the Luftwaffe. Schmorell and Scholl scratched the line, as they believed that it was wrong to support any branch of the army in Nazi Germany. Disgruntled, Huber walked out of the meeting. It was the last time that he saw Hans Scholl.

== Arrest ==
Huber's political activities came to the attention of the Gestapo, and he was arrested on 27 February 1943. By coincidence, composer Carl Orff came to visit the next day. Huber's distraught wife, Clara (née Schlickenrieder, 1908–1998), hoped Orff would use his influence to help her husband, but he said that he feared he was "ruined." Clara Huber later said she never saw Orff again, but there is documentary evidence that they had further contact. After the war, she asked Orff to contribute to a memorial volume for her husband; he contributed an emotional letter written directly to Huber. Orff's Die Bernauerin, a project which he completed in 1946 and which he had discussed with Huber before the latter's execution, is dedicated to Huber's memory. The final scene of this work, which is about the wrongful execution of Agnes Bernauer, depicts a guilt-ridden chorus begging not to be implicated in the title character's death.

== Trial and execution ==
Huber was brought before the People's Court on 19 April. In a brief show trial, Chief Justice Roland Freisler subjected Huber to a humiliating verbal attack. He was sentenced to death for insurrection.

On 13 July, he was alerted that he and Alexander Schmorell were to be executed by guillotine later that day. The executions were supposed to be carried out at 5 pm, but as Huber prepared himself, he learned that the execution would be delayed. Several SS officers had appeared at Stadelheim under orders to observe the execution to see how long it took for each man to die; the SS officers were then supposed to report back to their superiors with suggestions on how to shorten or prolong the suffering of the man being hanged. The officers were put off when they learned that the execution was to be by guillotine and not hanging. They then demanded a detailed explanation of how the guillotine worked, so their time was not wasted. The execution was delayed until the SS officers left. At around 5 pm, the guards came for Alexander Schmorell. A few minutes later, the guards came for Kurt Huber.

The university had stripped Huber of his position and his doctorate at the time of his arrest. Attempts to take up a collection for Huber's widow, Clara, eventually led to Hans Leipelt's arrest and execution.

== Legacy ==
The square opposite to the main building of the Ludwig-Maximilians-Universität München was named Professor Huber Platz in his memory. Huber wrote a biography of Gottfried Leibniz, which he completed while in prison and which was published in 1951 after being edited by his wife and pupil. After the war, a memorial volume with contributions from his friends and colleagues, including the 1946 letter from Carl Orff, was published by his widow.
