= Alexander Schmorell =

Founder of the anti-Nazi White Rose (1917–1943)

Saint Alexander of Munich
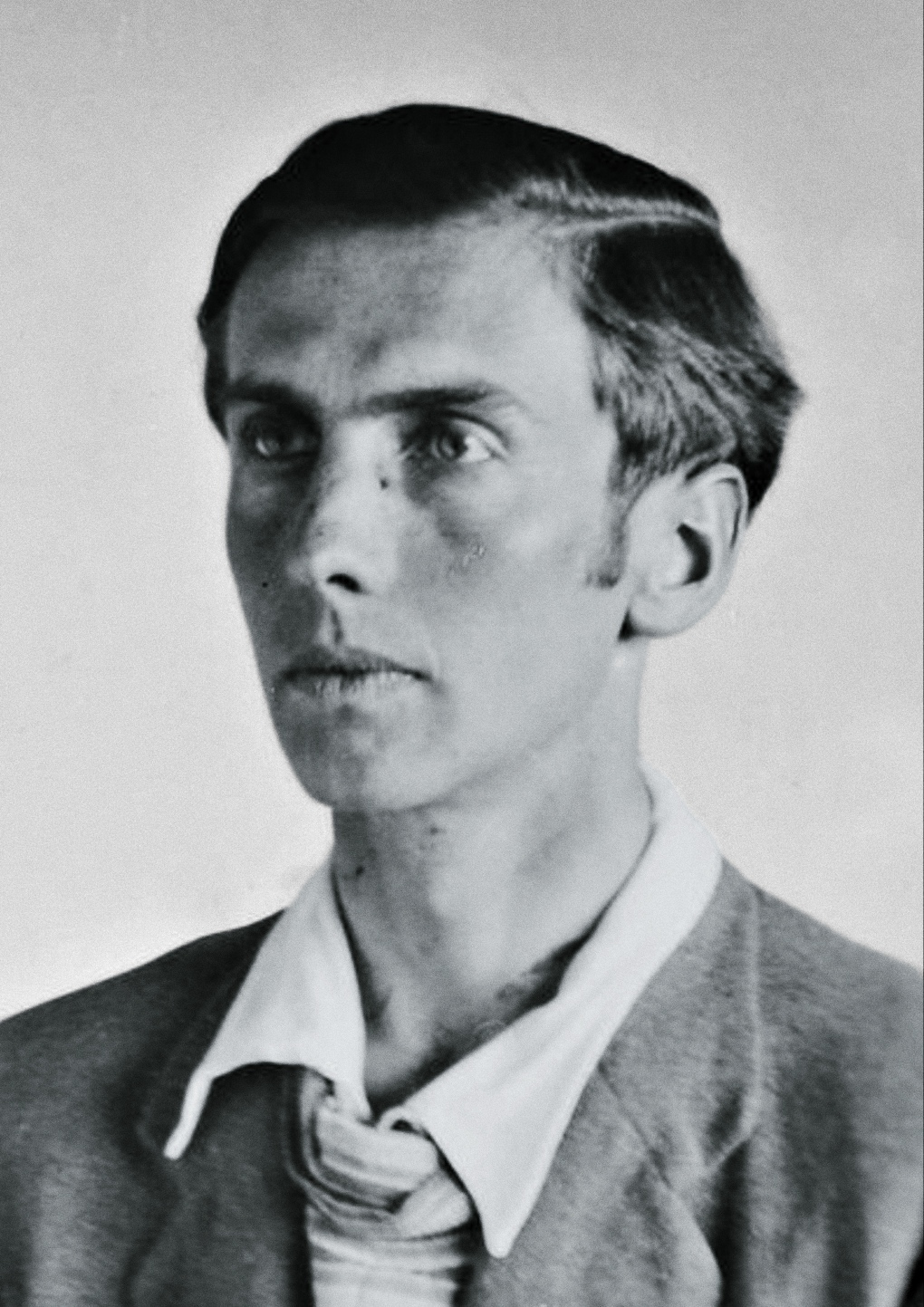
- Gestapo photo of Alexander Schmorell, taken after his capture on February 24, 1943

Passion-Bearer
- Born: 16 September 1917; Orenburg, Russian Empire
- Died: 13 July 1943 (aged 25); Munich, Nazi Germany
- Venerated in: Eastern Orthodox Church
- Canonized: 5 February 2012, Munich, Germany by ROCOR
- Major shrine: Cathedral of the Holy New Martyrs and Confessors of Russia, Munich, Bavaria, Germany
- Feast: 13 July (O.S. 30 June)

Alexander Schmorell (Note: German pronunciation: [alɛkˈsandɐ ˈʃmoːʁɛl]; Russian: Александр Гугович Шморель, romanized: Aleksandr Gugovich Shmorel', pronounced [ɐlʲɪkˈsandr ˈɡuɡəvʲɪtɕ ˈʂmorɛlʲ].) (16 September [O.S. 3 September] 1917 – 13 July 1943), also sometimes referred to as Saint Alexander of Munich, was a Russian-German student at the Ludwig-Maximilians-Universität München who, with five others, formed a resistance group (part of the Widerstand) known as White Rose (German: Weiße Rose) which was active against the Nazi German regime from June 1942 to February 1943. He was executed by the Nazi regime in 1943.

In 2012, he was glorified as a saint and passion bearer by the Russian Orthodox Church Outside Russia, and is venerated by Orthodox Christians throughout the world.

== Early life ==
Alexander Schmorell was born in Orenburg, Russia, on 16 September [O.S. 3 September] 1917 (Russia still used the Julian calendar when he was born). Schmorell's father was Hugo Schmorell, a German-born physician who was raised in the Russian Empire. Schmorell's mother was Natalia Vedenskaya, a Russian and the daughter of a Russian Orthodox priest. Schmorell was baptised in the Russian Orthodox Church. His mother died of typhus during the Russian Civil War when he was two years old. In 1920, his widowed father married a German woman, Elisabeth Hoffman, who, like him, was raised in Russia. In 1921 the family fled from Russia and moved to Munich, Weimar Germany, Schmorell was four years old at the time. In Germany, he grew up with his step-siblings Erich Schmorell (born 1921) and Natalie Schmorell (born 1925), as well as his Russian nanny, Feodosiya Lapschina. She took his late mother's place in his upbringing.

His nanny never learned how to speak German. Because of this, Alexander Schmorell grew up bilingual, speaking both German and Russian natively. His friends gave him the nickname 'Schurik', a nickname he would be called by his closer friends for the rest of his life. He was an Eastern Orthodox Christian who considered himself both German and Russian. As declared in the Gestapo's interrogations, he was a convinced Tsarist and then an archenemy of the Bolsheviks.

== Military service ==
After his Abitur (equivalent to high level high school diploma), he was called into the Reich Labour Service and then into the Wehrmacht. In 1937, he volunteered to join the Wehrmacht. At the last moment, however, he had second thoughts and refused to swear the Hitler Oath, yet was still allowed to join. In 1938, he took part in the Anschluss (the Nazi annexation of Austria) and eventually in the invasion of Czechoslovakia.

== Work in the White Rose, Summer 1942 ==
After his military service, the artistically gifted Schmorell began studies in medicine in 1939 in Hamburg. In the autumn of 1940, he returned with his student corps to Munich where he came to know Hans Scholl, whom he met through Christoph Probst, his life-long friend.

In June 1942, Schmorell, together with Hans Scholl, began the Nazi resistance movement "The White Rose". Their form of resistance was simple but dangerous: writing leaflets. Quoting extensively from the Bible, Aristotle and Novalis, as well as Goethe and Schiller, the iconic poets of German bourgeoisie, the leaflets appealed to what Schmorell and Scholl considered the German intelligentsia, believing that these people would be easily convinced by the same arguments that also motivated the authors themselves. These leaflets were left in telephone books in public phone booths, mailed to professors and students, and taken by courier to other universities for distribution.

== Deployment to Russia, July–November 1942 ==
In June 1942, male students at the Ludwig-Maximilians-Universität München were required to deploy to the Eastern Front over Summer break. Schmorell, along with Hans Scholl, Willi Graf, and Jürgen Wittenstein, served as medics in the 252nd Infantry Division in the Gzhatsk area from June to November 1942. During this time, White Rose activities ceased, and were not continued until the medics came home from the deployment.

While in Russia, Schmorell felt like he was at home. Although he had been born in Russia, he had no memories of his homeland, as he had emigrated when he was only four years old. In Russia, Schmorell, Scholl, Graf, and Wittenstein would sneak out of camp at night and would gather at the home of Russian peasants, where Schmorell and his friends would take part in Russian festivities.

In August 1942, Schmorell came down with diphtheria. At first, he did not tell his father and stepmother, as he did not want to burden them. He only told them of his sickness after he had recovered.

Schmorell and his friends left Russia on 31 October 1942. Schmorell, who had become infatuated with Russia, considered deserting the Wehrmacht, but decided against it. They returned to Munich on 5 November 1942.

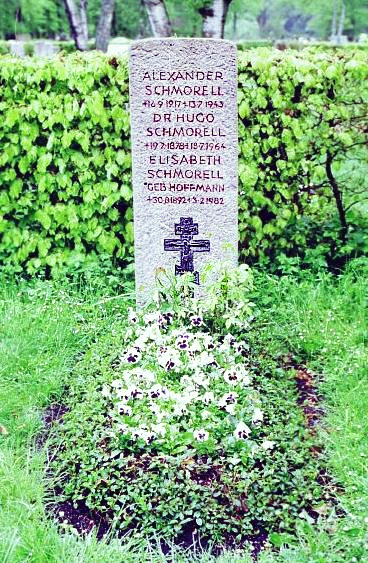
The grave of Schmorell, named with his parents, in Friedhof am Perlacher Forst, Munich.

== Work in the White Rose, November 1942 – January 1943 ==
In December 1942, Schmorell, along with Hans Scholl, sought contact with Professor Kurt Huber. Together in 1943 they wrote the fifth leaflet, "Aufruf an alle Deutschen!" ('Appeal to all Germans!'), which Schmorell then distributed in Austrian cities.

== Graffiti campaigns ==
On 3 February 1943, the news of the defeat at Stalingrad was broadcast to the German public. Later that day, Graf, Schmorell, and Scholl snuck out at night and graffitied public buildings with slogans such as "down with Hitler" and "Hitler the Mass murderer!" During the campaign, Schmorell would hold up the stencils while Graf painted the slogans on with tar paint. Scholl stood guard, armed with a pistol in case anyone walked in on their graffitiing. On 8 February 1943, Graf and Scholl graffitied again. This time, they used green oil-based paint. On 15 February 1943, Scholl, Schmorell, and Graf snuck out and graffitied the Feldherrnhalle, then a Nazi monument to the Nazis who were killed during the failed Beer Hall Putsch. The graffiti campaigns put the Gestapo on high alert.

== Capture ==
On 18 February 1943, Sophie and Hans Scholl went to the Ludwig-Maximilians-Universität München to leave flyers out for the students to read. They were seen by Jakob Schmid, a custodian at the university who was also a Gestapo informer. Schmid alerted the Gestapo, who took Hans and Sophie in custody. Alexander soon learned of their capture. He then went to Willi Graf's house with the intention of warning him that Hans and Sophie had been captured. Graf was not at home, so Schmorell left a coded message and went to one of his friends' houses. His friend helped him to get fake papers and gave him food and extra clothing. Schmorell's original plan was to enter a prisoner of war camp for Russian POWs, but that plan fell through when his contact did not show up. Schmorell then attempted to escape to Switzerland. Fierce weather forced him back, and he returned to Munich on 24 February 1943. At around 10 PM, the air raid alarm sounded. When Schmorell attempted to enter the air raid shelter, he was recognized by a former girlfriend. The Gestapo were called, and Schmorell was arrested. He was captured by the Gestapo on 24 February 1943, the same day as Sophie, Hans and Christoph's funeral. During the time between his capture and his trial, Schmorell was interrogated multiple times.

== Trial and execution ==
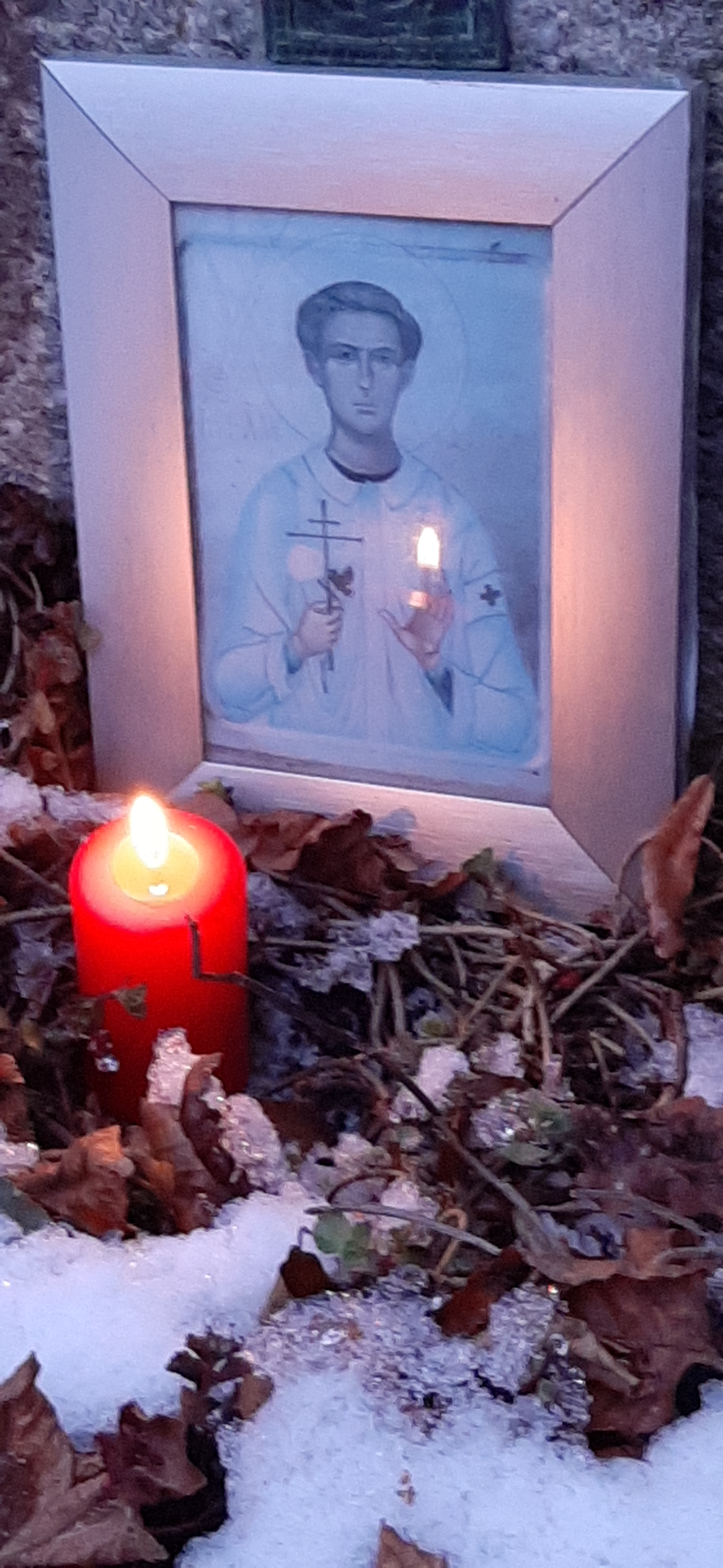
Icon of Saint Alexander of Munich at his grave

On 19 April 1943, Alexander Schmorell was put on trial, along with 13 other members of the White Rose group. Schmorell, Willi Graf, and Kurt Huber were sentenced to death. The others received prison sentences.

Unlike the first trial, where the death sentences had been carried out the same day as the verdict, Alexander's execution was delayed as his family petitioned for clemency. After about two months of deliberation, a letter came to the prison that said: "I reject all petitions for mercy." It was signed "Adolf Hitler".

On 13 July, Alexander and Kurt Huber were alerted that their execution would happen later that day. After receiving the Eucharist from an Orthodox priest, he was allowed to write a last letter to his family. Alexander wrote to his parents:

I am going with the awareness that I followed my deepest convictions and the truth. This allows me to meet my hour of death with a conscience at peace. Think of the millions of young men who have lost their lives out on the field—their fate is the same as mine...In a few hours I will be in a better life, with my mother, and I will not forget you; I will ask God to grant you solace and peace. Yours, Shurik.

The executions were supposed to be carried out at 5 pm, but as Schmorell prepared himself, he learned that the execution would be delayed. Several SS officers had appeared at Stadelheim under orders to observe the execution to see how long it took for each man to die; the SS officers were then supposed to report back to their superiors with suggestions on how to shorten or prolong the suffering of the man being hanged. The officers were put off when they learned that the execution was to be by guillotine and not hanging. They then demanded a detailed explanation of how the guillotine worked, so their time was not wasted. The execution was delayed until the SS officers left.

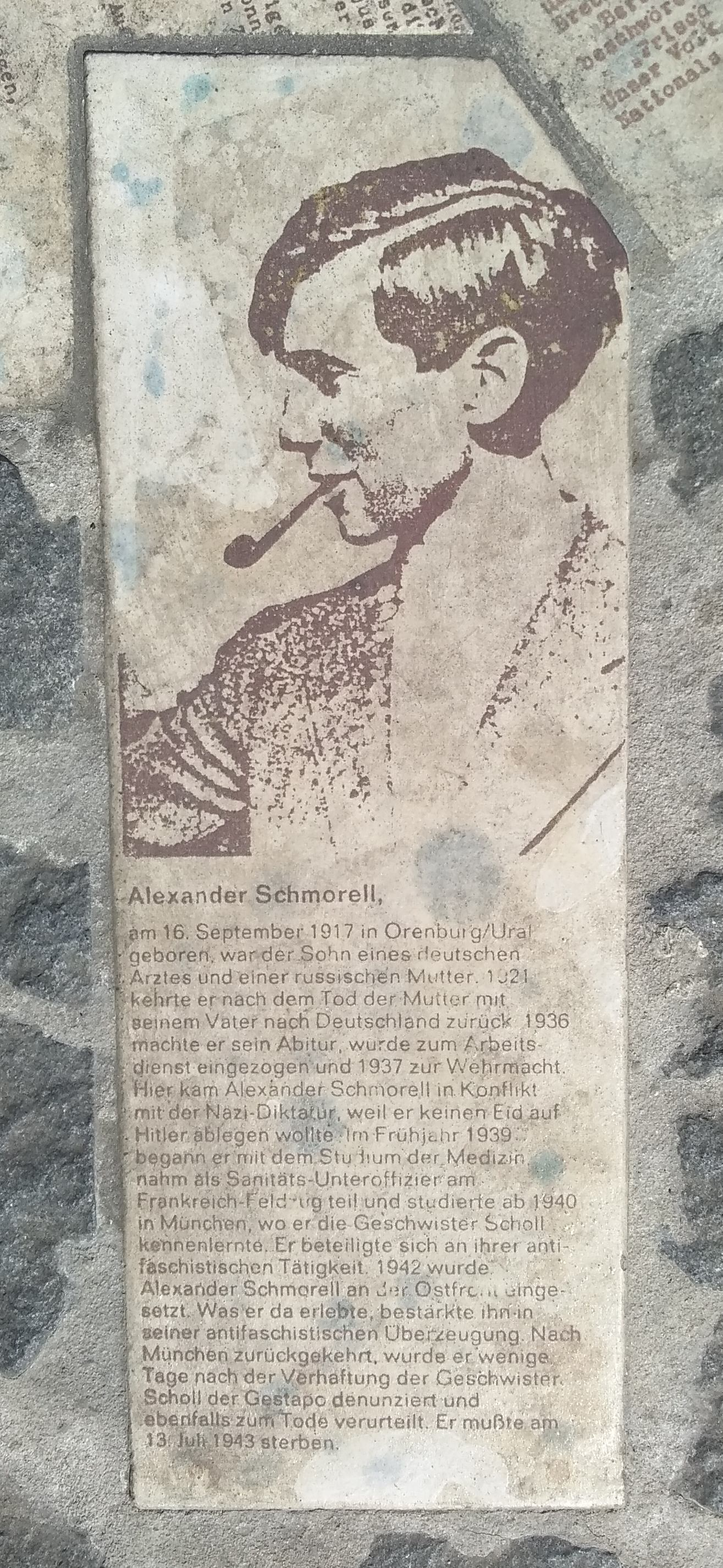
Sidewalk monument near LMU Munich, depicting Alexander Schmorell

The guards came for Alexander a little after 5 pm. He was led out of his cell and into the courtyard, walking to his death with his head held high, he said to his lawyer, "I'm convinced that my life has to end now, early as it may seem, for I have fulfilled my life's mission. I wouldn't know what else I have to do on this earth." In the execution chamber, the state attorney asked if his name was Alexander Schmorell, to which he replied, "yes", and then the blade fell. Kurt Huber was executed a few minutes later.

== Legacy ==
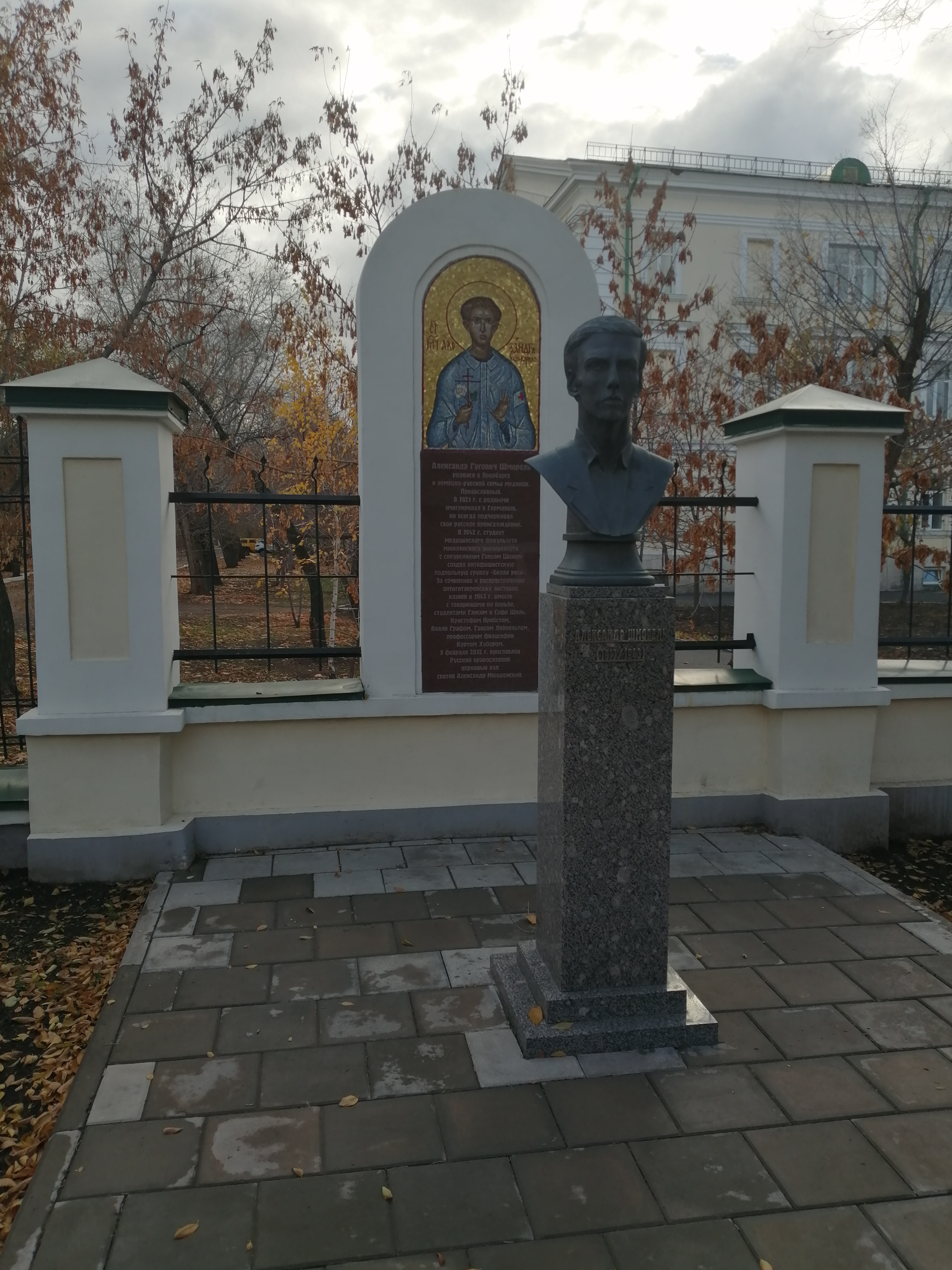
Icon and monument of Saint Alexander of Munich in Orenburg, Russia.

Schools bear Schmorell's name in the German cities of Rostock and Kassel. Streets named after Schmorell ('Alexander-Schmorell-Straßen') are found in Bad Oeynhausen, Westerstede, Grünwald, Halle, Schlangen, Unterhaching, Neuss, and Dormagen. Plaza squares in Munich and Raunheim also bear his name (as 'Schmorellplatz').

In Orenburg, Russia, four students every year are awarded the Alexander Schmorell scholarships by the White Rose Foundation. Also in Orenburg is a park named after Schmorell in the center of the city. In 2020, a monument was erected in honor of Schmorell in front of the Medical Faculty building of Orenburg University.

=== Sainthood ===
In November 1981, the Russian Orthodox Church Outside Russia (ROCOR) canonized the new martyrs of Russia during the Third Reich. Schmorell was not canonized until February 5, 2012, when Schmorell was glorified as a saint and passion bearer (titled as Saint Alexander of Munich) by the ROCOR in Munich, Germany, on 5 February 2012. This followed a solemn ceremony in concelebration with the Russian Orthodox bishops in the Munich Cathedral.

The feast day of St. Alexander of Munich in the liturgy is 13 July. In 2010, a memorial plaque for Schmorell was installed at the Old City of Jerusalem.

=== In media ===
Schmorell was portrayed by Oliver Siebert in the CCC film Die Weiße Rose (The White Rose) (1982) and by Johannes Suhm in the film Sophie Scholl: The Final Days (2005). The 2000 NETSKI TV film In Search of the White Rose by Savva Kulish was dedicated to his memory. For the 100th birthday of Sophie Scholl, German broadcasters Südwestrundfunk and Bayerischer Rundfunk created the @ichbinsophiescholl project where Schmorell was played by David Hugo Schmitz.
