= Hans Scholl =

Founder of the anti-Nazi White Rose (1918–1943)

- Born: 22 September 1918; Crailsheim, German Empire
- Died: 22 February 1943 (aged 24); Stadelheim Prison, Nazi Germany
- Cause of death: Execution by guillotine
- Resting place: Perlacher Friedhof, Munich; 48.097344°N 11.59949°E
- Occupations: Soldier, medic, student, resistance founder
- Parent(s): Robert Scholl; Magdalena Müller
- Relatives: Inge Scholl (sister); Elisabeth Hartnagel-Scholl (sister); Sophie Scholl (sister); Werner Scholl (brother)

Hans Fritz Scholl (German: [hans ʃɔl]; 22 September 1918 – 22 February 1943) was, along with Alexander Schmorell, one of the two founding members of the White Rose resistance movement in Nazi Germany. The principal author of the resistance movement's literature, he was found guilty of high treason for distributing anti-Nazi material and was executed by the Nazi regime in 1943 during World War II.

== Early life ==
Scholl was born in Ingersheim (now a part of Crailsheim, Baden-Württemberg) on 22 September 1918 to Robert and Magdalena Scholl. His father later became the mayor of Forchtenberg am Kocher. He was the second eldest of six children. His siblings were: Inge Aicher-Scholl (1917–1998); Elisabeth Scholl Hartnagel (1920–2020), who married Sophie's long-term boyfriend, Fritz Hartnagel; Sophie Scholl (1921–1943); Werner Scholl (1922–1944), who served as a Wehrmacht medical officer and went missing in action on the Eastern Front and presumed dead in June 1944; and Thilde Scholl (1925–1926).

Scholl was raised as a Lutheran, although he did at one point consider converting to Catholicism. Against the declared will of his father, he became an enthusiastic member of the Hitler Youth on 15 April 1933, and initially held leadership positions in the Deutsches Jungvolk, but quickly became disillusioned with the group when he realised its true principles. In 1935, he was one of three standard-bearers from Ulm who took part in the Nazi Party's "Reich Party Rally for Freedom" from 10 to 16 September in Nuremberg. During this time, his attitude towards the Nazi regime gradually began to change. One reason was that the fanaticism promoted in the Hitler Youth and the unconditional subordination to the power structures ruling there became more and more repugnant.

== 1937–1938 trial ==
Scholl was arrested in 1937–38 because of his membership in a forbidden Youth Movement organisation. Hans Scholl had joined the Deutsche Jungenschaft vom 1.11.1929 (d.j.1.11) in 1934, when he and other Hitler Youth members in Ulm considered membership in this group and the Hitler Youth to be compatible.

During the trial, Scholl was also charged under Paragraph 175, the paragraph in the German Criminal Code that criminalized homosexual behavior. Under questioning, he admitted to having had two separate sexual relationships, one with Rolf Futterknecht, and one with Ernest Reden, who had also made advances on his brother Werner. Futterknecht had been the one to inform on Hans.

Scholl made a positive impact on the judge, who dismissed the choice to join the youth groups as the "youthful exuberance" and "obstinate personality" of a "headstrong young man." The judge then dismissed the homosexual allegations as a "youthful failing." Hans was allowed to leave the trial with a clean slate. Ernest Reden, on the other hand, was sentenced to three months prison and three months in a Nazi concentration camp for the relationship.

After Scholl's trial, no one spoke of the allegations against him. The only people who knew were his parents and his older sister, Inge, who never spoke about the charges.

== Medical studies and Wehrmacht ==
In spring of 1937, he joined the Reich Labour Service, having volunteered for duty. He was discharged in March 1939 to attend medical school at the Ludwig-Maximilians-Universität München (LMU). At the university, he came into contact with professors, teachers, and students who represented positions that were clearly Christian-ethical and critical of the regime. Therefore, Hans began to question his own ideological position more critically.

During the semester break, he was drafted as a medic for front service and took the rank of medical sergeant in the French campaign. What he experienced during direct frontline operations reinforced his personal stance against the rulers and the war in particular. Hans was again enrolled in the military service in the spring of 1941 as a medic in the Wehrmacht.

== Origins of the White Rose ==
Between 1940 and 1941, Scholl, a former member of the Hitler Youth, began questioning the principles and policies of the Nazi regime. As a student at the Ludwig-Maximilians-Universität München (LMU), Scholl met two Roman Catholic men of letters who redirected his life, inspiring him to turn from studying medicine and pursue religion, philosophy, and the arts. Through Schmorell, Scholl met female medical student Traute Lafrenz in 1941. Scholl and Lafrenz soon became close friends, and for a time in summer 1941 they were lovers.

After their experiences at the Eastern Front, having learned about mass murder in Poland and the Soviet Union, Scholl and Alexander Schmorell felt compelled to take action. From the end of June until mid-July 1942, they wrote the first four leaflets. Quoting extensively from the Bible, Aristotle and Novalis, as well as German poets Goethe and Schiller, they appealed to what they considered the German intelligentsia, believing that these people would be easily convinced by the same arguments that also motivated the authors themselves. These leaflets were left in telephone books in public phone booths, mailed to professors and students, and taken by courier to other universities for distribution.

From 23 July to 30 October 1942, Willi Graf, Scholl and Schmorell served again at the Soviet front, and activities ceased until their return. After their return, Willi Graf became one of the core members of the White Rose. Sophie was the second to last member to join. By the end of December 1942, Kurt Huber became the last main member of the White Rose.

With six core members, two more White Rose pamphlets were created and circulated over the summer of 1942.

The leaflets were distributed around the Ludwig-Maximilians-Universität München, where many of the group members studied. Leaflets were distributed at the University of Hamburg and in the city of Ulm as well. Additionally, leaflets were also mailed to doctors, scholars, and pub owners throughout Germany.

== Capture and execution ==
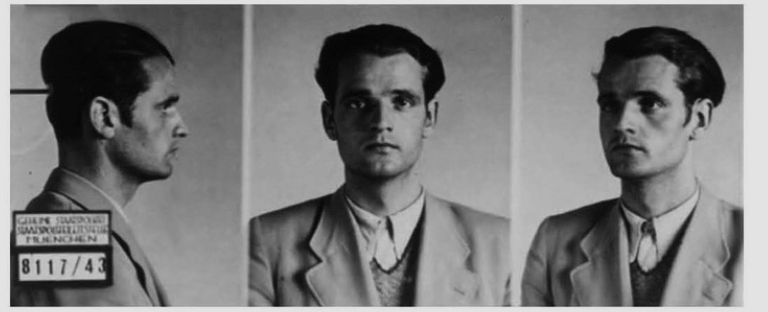
Mugshots of Scholl taken by the Gestapo 1943

On 18 February 1943, while Hans and Sophie were distributing leaflets at the Ludwig-Maximilians-Universität München, Sophie flung the last remaining leaflets from the top floor down into the atrium. This spontaneous action was observed by the university maintenance man, Jakob Schmid. Schmid reported the offense and the Scholls were arrested by the Gestapo. Along with Christoph Probst, the two siblings were tried for treason by Judge Roland Freisler. They were found guilty and condemned to death on 22 February.

During his interrogation, Hans tried to protect his sister by claiming to have thrown the leaflets himself, but his testimony was contradicted by the custodian's. He further tried to hide the role played by other members of the White Rose. Hans was well aware of the likely consequence of his actions.

"I knew what I took upon myself and I was prepared to lose my life by so doing."

— From the interrogation of Hans Scholl.

At the trial, Hans, Sophie, and Christoph Probst were sentenced to death. They were originally scheduled to be hanged in public (work had already begun on the scaffolds) but the officials feared they would be immortalized as martyrs if they were killed in public. As such, a last minute decision was made to switch the execution method to the guillotine.

After the trial, Hans, Sophie and Probst were brought to Stadelheim Prison. While there, they were told that they would be executed the same day. This came as a shock to them, as prisoners were supposed to have at least a 99-day respite before execution. Left in separate cells, they began to write their last letters.

While in their cells, Hans, Sophie, and Probst each saw a priest to give them the last rites of the Catholic Church. Christoph Probst, who was not part of any denomination, asked to be baptized into the Catholic Church. Hans and Sophie each also asked individually to be allowed into the Catholic Church, but their Lutheran minister advised against it, on the basis that it would upset their mother, who was a devout Lutheran.

At around 4-5 pm, Robert and Magdalena Scholl, the parents of Sophie and Hans, went to the prison and demanded to see their children. To their surprise, the request was granted. Robert and Magdalena were led to a room. In a few minutes Hans entered. Dressed in prison uniform, he stood tall as he walked to his parents and grabbed their hands through the barrier separating them, telling them, "I have no hatred. I have put everything behind me." His father replied, "You will go down in history – there is such a thing as justice."

After Hans was led out, Sophie was brought in. Dressed in civilian clothes, she smiled happily, pleased to see her parents. After speaking for a few minutes, her mother grasped her hands and said, "You know, Sophie – Jesus." "Yes, but you too," Sophie replied. She walked out of the room, head held high.

A few minutes before the execution, the three of them were allowed to be together for a short while. While there, they were given a cigarette to share. Probst is credited with remarking, "I didn’t know dying could be so easy." At around 5 pm, the executioners came for Sophie. After a few minutes, a dull thump was heard. The executioner came for Hans next. Unlike Sophie, who had gone to her death silently, Hans shouted "Es lebe die Freiheit!" ("Long live freedom!") as the blade came down. Christoph was the last to be executed. He was unable to see any of his family before he died.

After the trial of Hans, Sophie, and Probst, three more trials of the White Rose members took place. In the end, 29 people were accused of being members of the White Rose; 16 were executed and 13 were given prison sentences ranging from six months to 10 years.

== Legacy ==
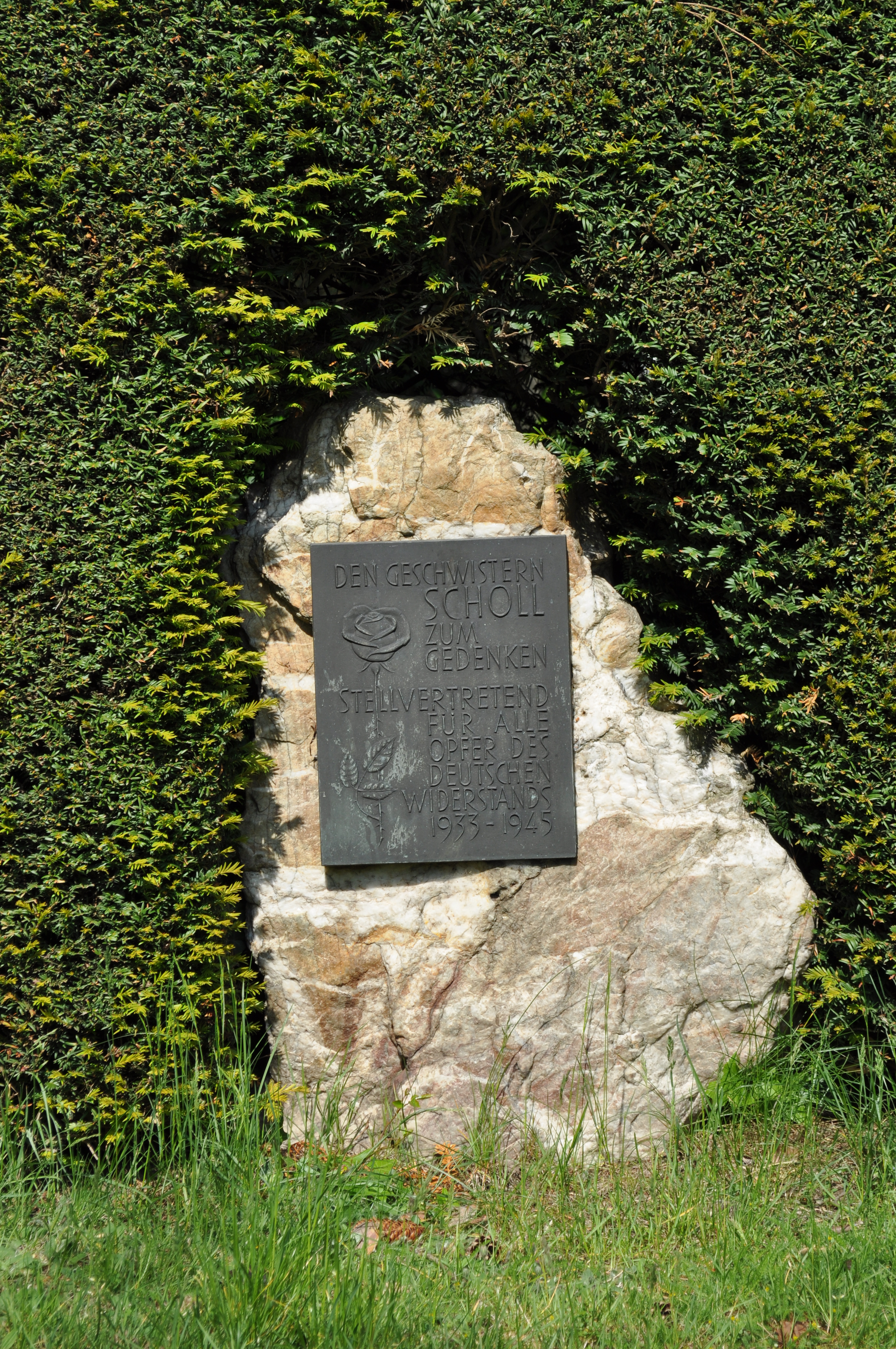
Scholl memorial in Bommersheim

Following the deaths, a copy of the sixth leaflet was smuggled out of Germany through Scandinavia to the UK by German jurist Helmuth James Graf von Moltke, where it was used by the Allied Forces. In July 1943, they dropped millions of copies of the tract, retitled The Manifesto of the Students of Munich, over Germany.

The White Rose's legacy has been considered significant by many historical commentators, both as a demonstration of exemplary spiritual courage, and as a well-documented case of social dissent in a time of violent repression, censorship, and pressure to conform.

Playwright Lillian Garrett-Groag stated in Newsday (22 February 1993):

It is possibly the most spectacular moment of resistance that I can think of in the twentieth century... The fact that five little kids, in the mouth of the wolf, where it really counted, had the tremendous courage to do what they did, is spectacular to me. I know that the world is better for them having been there, but I do not know why.

In the same issue of Newsday, Holocaust historian Jud Newborn noted:

You cannot really measure the effect of this kind of resistance in whether or not X number of bridges were blown up or a regime fell... The White Rose really has a more symbolic value, but that's a very important value.

It was not until the 1998 law to abolish Nazi judgments of injustice in the administration of criminal justice that the sentences against Hans Scholl and other members of the White Rose became void in Germany.

In 2003, Germans were invited by television broadcaster ZDF to participate in Unsere Besten (Our Best), a nationwide competition to choose the top ten most important Germans of all time. Voters under the age of 40 helped Scholl and his sisters to finish in fourth place, above Johann Sebastian Bach, Johann Wolfgang von Goethe, Johannes Gutenberg, Otto von Bismarck, Willy Brandt, and Albert Einstein. If the votes of young viewers alone had been counted, Sophie and Hans Scholl would have been ranked first.

The Audimax of the Bundeswehr Medical Academy in Munich was named after Hans Scholl in 2012.

== In film ==
Three films have been produced about the White Rose:

- Hans was portrayed by Michael Cornelius in the film Fünf Letze Tage (1982)
- Hans was portrayed by Wulf Kessler in the film Die Weisse Rose (1982)
- Hans was portrayed by Fabian Hinrichs in the film Sophie Scholl – The Final Days (2005).

== See also ==
- Geschwister-Scholl-Preis – a literary prize in honour of the Scholls
- Unsere Besten ("Our Best") – a listing of 100+ great Germans
- Helmuth Hübener
- Otto and Elise Hampel
