= Jakob Schmid =

German Nazi janitor (1886–1964)

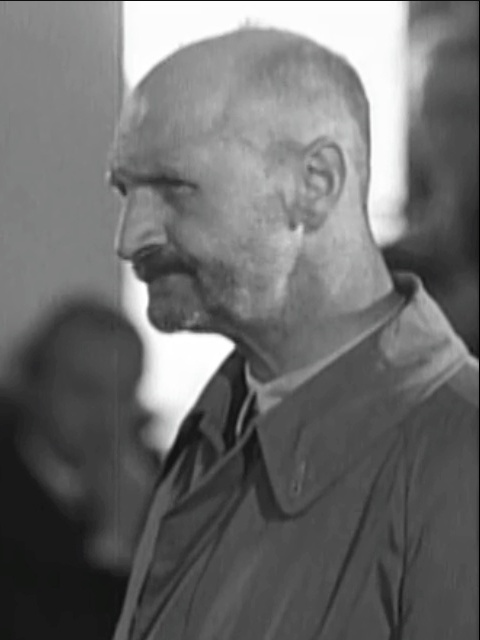
Jakob Schmid at his denazification trial in February 1947

Jakob Schmid (25 July 1886, in Traunstein – 16 August 1964) was a German janitor of LMU Munich. On 18 February 1943, he turned in the siblings Hans Scholl and Sophie Scholl, members of the resistance group White Rose, for distributing pamphlets against Nazi Germany.

== Schmid and the Scholl siblings ==
Schmid worked from 1926 as a janitor at the university. On 1 November 1933, he joined the SA and, on 1 May 1937, the Nazi Party.

On 18 February 1943, at around 11:15 am, he noticed the Scholl siblings giving out pamphlets in the atrium of the university. He confronted them as they were leaving the building and turned them over to the secretary, Albert Scheithammer. Since the principal Walther Wüst was absent, Schmid and Scheithammer took the Scholls to the consul of the university, Ernst Haeffner, who turned them over to the Gestapo.

The Scholls and other members of the White Rose were sentenced to death in a show trial on 22 February 1943. Three of them—Christoph Probst, Sophie Scholl and Hans Scholl—were executed the same day by guillotine in Stadelheim Prison.

Schmid received a reward of 3,000 Reichsmarks and was promoted from blue-collar worker to professional employee. Hundreds of students cheered Schmid at a thank-you ceremony organized by the Ludwig-Maximilians-Universität München (LMU) to deter student resistance. Schmid responded with a Nazi salute.

== After the war ==
Three days after the end of the Second World War, on 11 May 1945, Schmid was arrested by American occupation forces. He was released after 13 weeks, but lost his job. In 1946, Schmid was put on trial by a denazification court under the chairmanship of Karl Mayer. During his trial, which lasted four hours, Schmid claimed his actions had nothing to do with the contents of the pamphlets which the Scholls distributed. He said he only turned them in since distributing pamphlets was technically against university policy.

Schmid's defence was rejected, and Mayer classified him as a "Major Offender" according to the categorization established by the U.S. military government. Schmid was sentenced to five years in a labour camp, stripped of his pension, and lost his right to vote and hold public office. He appealed the sentence twice without success, once with the justification he had "done his duty." Schmid served his full sentence and was released in 1951. However, he had his pension and civil rights restored after his release. Schmid died in 1964.
