= Hartnagel =

Hartnagel is a German surname. Notable people with the surname include:

- Anke Hartnagel (1942–2004), German politician
- Christian Härtnagel (born 1982), German businessman
- Fritz Hartnagel (1917–2001), German lawyer and soldier

== See also ==
- Charlotte Schneidewind-Hartnagel (born 1953), German politician
- Elisabeth Hartnagel-Scholl (1920–2020), German centenarian
- Hartagel River
