= Geschwister-Scholl-Platz =

Semi-circular plaza in Munich, Germany

Coordinates: 48°09′02.68″N 11°34′50.25″E

Geschwister-Scholl-Platz (Scholl Siblings Plaza) is a short semi-circular plaza located in front of the main building of LMU Munich (Ludwig-Maximilians-Universität München), located on the Ludwigstraße in Munich, Germany. The plaza is named in memory of the Scholl siblings, Sophie Scholl and Hans Scholl, students at LMU Munich during World War II who were among the founding members of the White Rose (Weiße Rose) resistance movement.

== Images ==
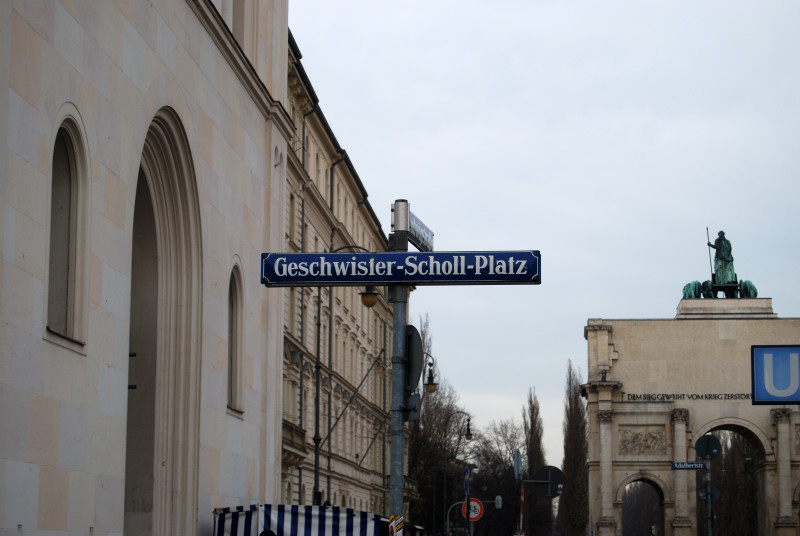
Street sign for Geschwister-Scholl-Platz in front of LMU Munich

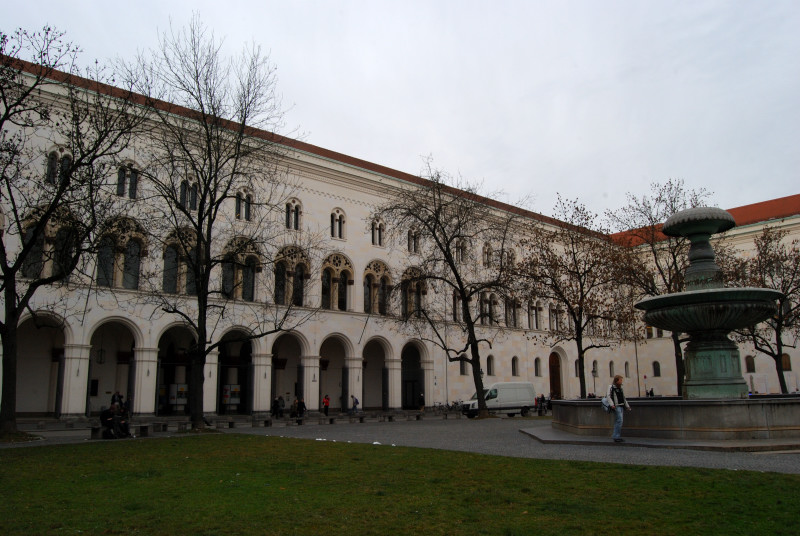
The plaza, showing the entrance for the main building of the university. In the foreground is the White Rose Memorial, a series of tile reproductions of the White Rose pamphlets scattered on the ground.
