= Hans and Sophie Scholl =

Siblings in the White Rose anti-Nazi group

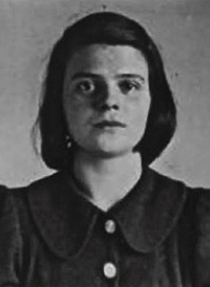
Photo of Sophie Scholl taken by the Gestapo, February 20, 1943

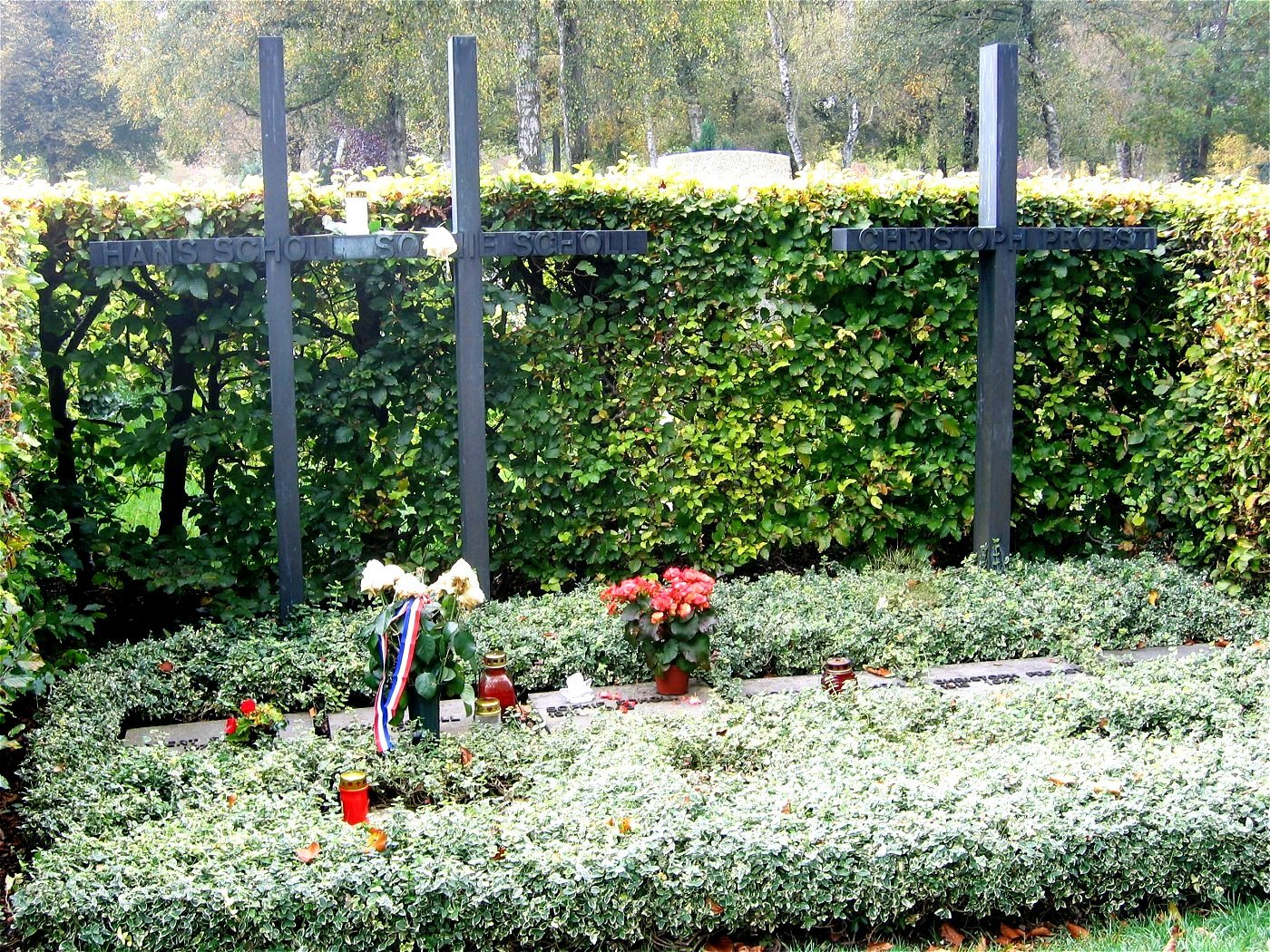
Grave site

Hans and Sophie Scholl, often referred to in German as die Geschwister Scholl (the Scholl siblings), were a brother and sister who were members of the White Rose, a student group in Munich that was active in the non-violent resistance movement in Nazi Germany, especially in distributing flyers against the war and the dictatorship of Adolf Hitler. In post-war Germany, Hans and Sophie Scholl are recognized as symbols of German resistance against the totalitarian Nazi regime.

== Biography ==
There were six Scholl siblings: Inge (1917–1998), Hans (1918–1943), Elisabeth (1920–2020), Sophie (1921–1943), Werner (1922–1944) and Thilde (1925–1926), whose family lived in Württemberg, in the towns of Forchtenberg (until 1930), Ludwigsburg (1930–1931) and Ulm (1932–).

On February 18, 1943, two of the siblings, Hans and Sophie, were handing out flyers at LMU Munich, when they were caught by the custodian, Jakob Schmid, who informed the Gestapo. By February 22, 1943, they had been sentenced to death by the People's Court, led by Judge-President Roland Freisler and were executed by guillotine on the same day in the Stadelheim Prison. Their grave is in the adjacent Perlacher Forst cemetery (grave number 73-1-18/19).

== Posthumous recognition ==
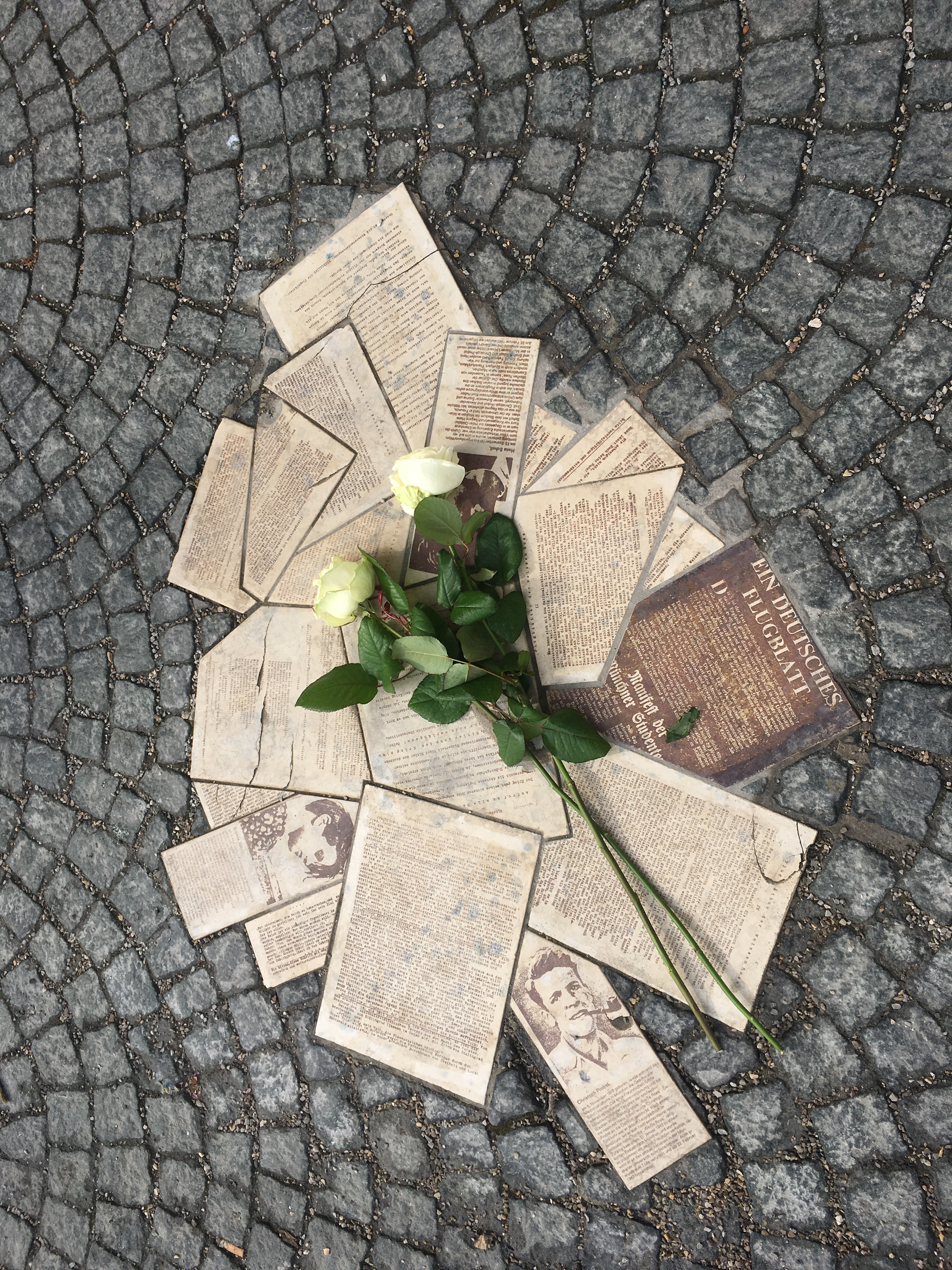
The memorial for the White Rose in front of the main building of LMU Munich depicts the group's flyers.

The Geschwister-Scholl-Preis is a literary prize initiated by the State Association of Bavaria of the Börsenverein des Deutschen Buchhandels and the city of Munich. Since 1980, they have annually awarded this prize to the book which "shows intellectual independence and supports civil freedom, moral, intellectual and aesthetic courage and that gives an important impulse to the present awareness of responsibility" ("das von geistiger Unabhängigkeit und geeignet ist, bürgerliche Freiheit, moralischen, intellektuellen und ästhetischen Mut zu fördern und dem gegenwärtigen Verantwortungsbewusstsein wichtige Impulse zu geben").

There are many memorial places for the Scholl siblings at LMU Munich. The new Geschwister-Scholl-Institut for political science, founded in the post-war era, was named after them on January 30, 1968. The area in front of the university's main building is named Geschwister-Scholl-Platz. The last flyer of the White Rose is set in the ground. Since 1997, a memorial to the Scholl siblings and other members of the White Rose can be found in the atrium of the main building, and since 2005, a bronze bust of Sophie Scholl. The Geschwister-Scholl-Preis is awarded annually in the auditorium of the university. However, a proposal by the student government to rename the university "Geschwister Scholl University" was rejected by the university's leadership.

Many cities in Germany have named streets, plazas and schools after the Scholl siblings.

It was, however, not until the 1998 law to abolish Nazi judgments of injustice in the administration of criminal justice that the sentences against Hans Scholl and other members of the White Rose became void in Germany.
