= Robert Scholl =

Father of Hans and Sophie Scholl and critic of the Nazi party

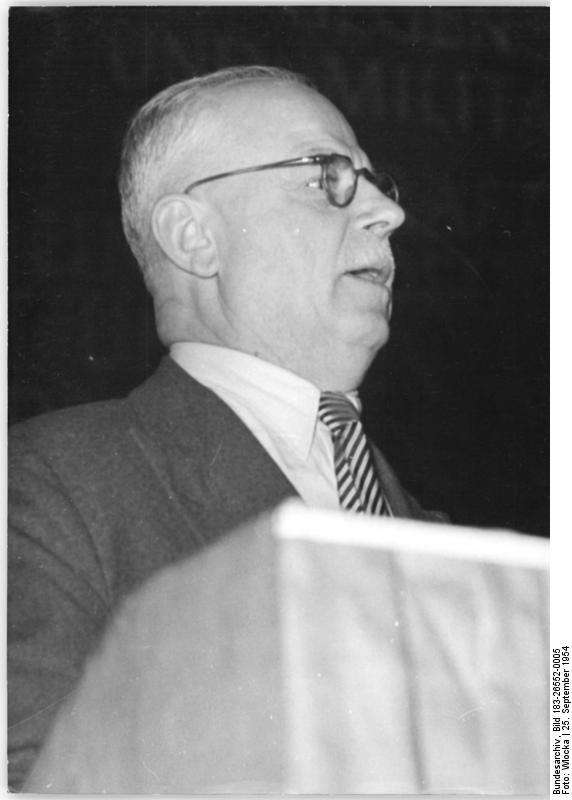
- Scholl at the 7th CDU party congress in 1954.
- Born: 13 April 1891; Mainhardt, Kingdom of Württemberg, German Empire
- Died: 25 October 1973 (aged 82); Munich, Bavaria, West Germany
- Occupations: politician, accountant
- Known for: Co-founder of the All-German People's Party; father of Hans and Sophie Scholl
- Spouse: Magdalena Scholl (née Müller)
- Children: 6, including Inge, Hans, Werner and Sophie

Robert Scholl (13 April 1891 – 25 October 1973) was a Württembergian politician and father of Hans and Sophie Scholl. Robert Scholl was a critic of the Nazi Party before, during and after the Nazi regime, and was twice sent to prison for his criticism of Nazism. He was mayor of Ingersheim 1917–1920, mayor of Forchtenberg 1920–1930 and lord mayor of Ulm 1945–1948, and co-founded the All-German People's Party in 1952.

== Personal life ==
Scholl was born in the Baden-Württemberg town of Mainhardt on 13 April 1891. During World War I, he met his future wife Magdalena Müller (1881–1958) when he was serving in the same hospital as her. The couple married shortly afterward and moved to Ingersheim an der Jagst. In 1920, they moved again to Forchtenberg. Robert and Magdalena Scholl had six children: Inge (1917–1998), Hans (1918–1943), Elisabeth (1920–2020), Sophie (1921–1943), Werner (1922–1944), and Thilde (1925–1926), four of whom they outlived. In 1930, the family moved to Ludwigsburg and in 1932 to Ulm, where Scholl founded a tax and accounting service company.

== Political life ==
Scholl became mayor of Ingersheim an der Jagst (now part of Crailsheim) in 1917 and in 1920, mayor of Forchtenberg, a position he held until 1930.

Scholl was a critic of the Nazi Party that came to power shortly thereafter. His children, like most during this era, were initially active in the Nazi youth organisations and their father was initially unable to dissuade them. However, his children quickly saw through the Hitler Youth facade, and eventually founded the White Rose, a political activism group supporting resistance to the Nazi party. In 1942, he was sentenced to four months in prison for calling Adolf Hitler the "scourge of God". The situation for the family gradually worsened. On 27 February 1943, five days after the execution of his children Hans and Sophie as members of the White Rose, Scholl was sentenced to 18 months in prison for listening to enemy radio broadcasts.

After World War II, he served as mayor of Ulm from June 1945 until 1948 and was a member of the preliminary parliament of Württemberg-Baden. In 1952, he co-founded the All-German People's Party with Gustav Heinemann and other like-minded politicians.

== In film ==
Robert Scholl was portrayed by Jörg Hube in the film Sophie Scholl – The Final Days (2005).
