= All-German People's Party =

All-German People's Party Gesamtdeutsche Volkspartei
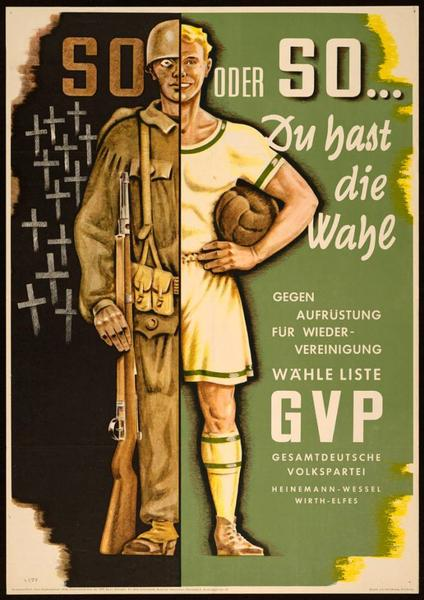
- 1953 election poster by the party, pushing their anti-rearmament message
- Abbreviation: GVP
- Leader: Gustav Heinemann
- Founded: 1952
- Dissolved: 1957
- Split from: Christian Democratic Union and Centre Party
- Merged into: Social Democratic Party of Germany
- Ideology: Centrism; Christian democracy Christian left Christian pacifism Neutralism
- Political position: Centre-left

The All-German People's Party (German: Gesamtdeutsche Volkspartei, GVP) was a minor political party in West Germany active between 1952 and 1957. It was a Christian, pacifist, centre-left party that opposed the re-armament of West Germany because it believed that the remilitarisation and NATO integration would make German reunification impossible, deepen the division of Europe and pose a danger to peace.

Most members were dissidents from the Christian Democratic Union or German Centre Party who disagreed with the foreign and intra-German policy of Konrad Adenauer's government. The party failed to win broader public support, only gaining 1.2% in the federal election. The party dissolved and many members joined the Social Democratic Party (SPD), with a number of former GVP activists rising to high-ranking positions, including two Presidents of Germany, Gustav Heinemann and Johannes Rau.

== Foundation and aims ==
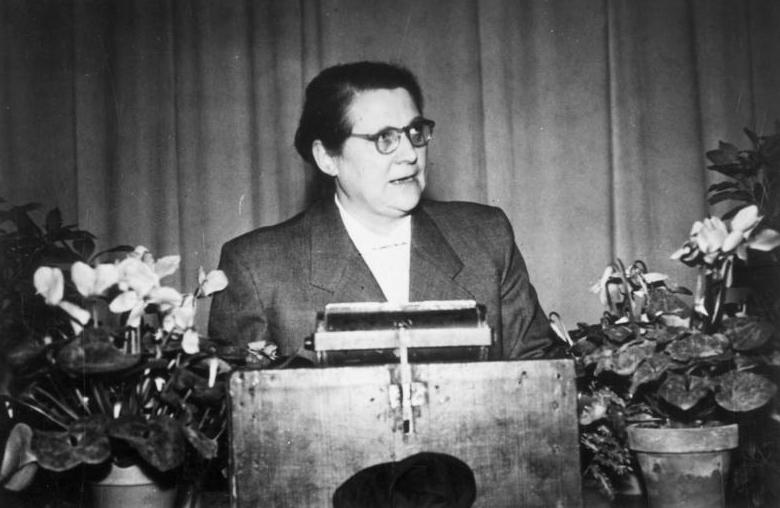
Helene Wessel on the GVP founding convention 1952

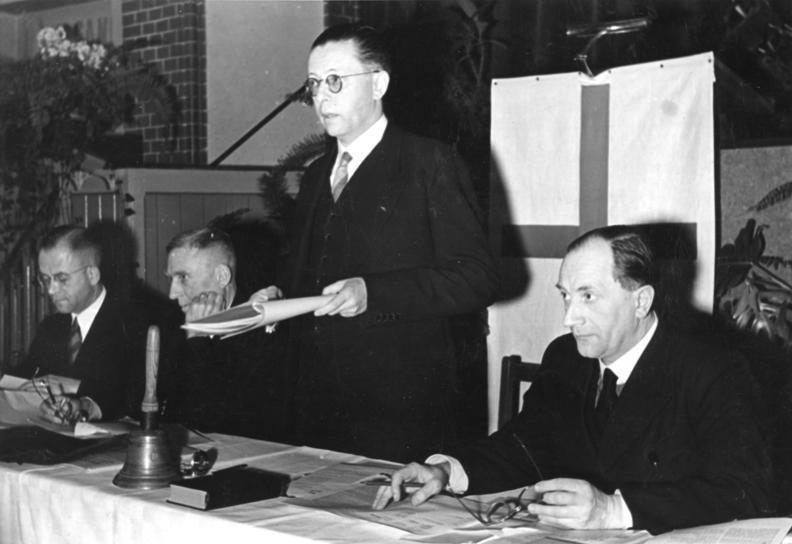
Gustav Heinemann in 1949

The party was formed by a number of former CDU or German Centre Party members and former Confessing Church supporters, who opposed the re-armament of Germany and a close co-operation with the Western powers. The forerunner of the party was the "Emergency Association for Peace in Europe" (Notgemeinschaft für den Frieden Europas), founded in November 1951 by Gustav Heinemann and Robert Scholl, the father of the resistance activist Sophie Scholl .

Heinemann was the president of the synod of the Evangelical Church in Germany and had been a CDU member and minister of the interior in Adenauer's first cabinet from 1949 to 1950 before he resigned in protest against Adenauer's secret negotiations with the Americans about a West German contribution to a Western military alliance. Together with Helene Wessel, then chair of the Catholic Centre Party, and two other persons he formed the steering committee of the party which did not have a chairman. Heinemann and Wessel often appeared together in order to appeal to both Protestants and Catholics.

The party believed in détente and favoured plebiscites. It refused to monopolise Christian faith for anti-communist positions and advocated for fighting antisemitism and religious prejudice. On economic issues, the party refrained from taking a definite position given that its members' views were too diverse.

== Elections and legacy ==
In the only Bundestag election the party took part in, the 1953 election, they managed to obtain only 1.3% of votes (for the common list with the East German-funded Bund der Deutschen ("Alliance of Germans"). The only—moderate—electoral success of the GVP were the local elections in the state of North Rhine-Westphalia (both Heinemann's and Wessel's home state) on October 28, 1956, where the party got 78 seats. After they could only win 1.6% in the Baden-Württemberg legislative election of 1956, the GVP was formally disbanded on May 19, 1957.

The party recommended that members join the Social Democratic Party of Germany. Some members had already left the GVP for the SPD. The Social Democrats had refused to adopt GVP members on their lists for the federal election of 1957 but granted good list positions to some former GVP members (among them Heinemann and Wessel). This helped SPD to open itself to parts of the Christian, especially Protestant, middle-class.

A number of former GVP members had substantial careers in the Social Democratic party. Erhard Eppler became federal minister on development aid, Jürgen Schmude on education and Diether Posser state minister in North Rhine-Westphalia. Most noteworthy, Gustav Heinemann and Johannes Rau, two of the only three SPD Presidents of Germany, had both been earlier GVP members.
