= Christoph Probst =

German medical student and anti-Nazi resistance member (1919–1943)

Portrait of Probst

Christoph Ananda Probst (6 November 1919 – 22 February 1943) was a German medical student and member of the anti-Nazi resistance group White Rose (Weiße Rose). Although less publicly known than Hans Scholl and Sophie Scholl, Probst played a key intellectual role in the group’s efforts to oppose the Nazi regime through nonviolent means.

His final contribution—a draft for a new leaflet calling for an end to the war—was discovered upon Hans Scholl’s arrest and led directly to Probst’s own execution. He is remembered for his quiet conviction, moral clarity, and for placing conscience above personal safety, even as a young husband and father of three.

== Early life ==
Christoph Ananda Probst was born in Murnau am Staffelsee, Bavaria, on 6 November 1919. He grew up in a liberal, free-thinking household where cultural and religious tolerance were core values. His father, Hermann Probst, a private scholar and Sanskrit researcher, encouraged intellectual independence and spiritual openness in his two children, Christoph and Angelika. Christoph’s middle name "Ananda" (Sanskrit: आनन्द ānanda), meaning “bliss”, reflected these influences. Hermann Probst fostered friendships with artists and intellectuals who were deemed by the Nazis to be "decadent" or "degenerate". Among the family's friends were Emil Nolde and Paul Klee.

After Hermann's first marriage to Christoph's mother, Karin Katharina Kleeblatt, ended in separation, he married Elise Jaffée, who was Jewish. Christoph attended two boarding schools—Marquartstein and later Landheim Schondorf. At the latter, he met Alexander Schmorell, who became a close friend and would later introduce him to the White Rose circle.

His sister Angelika later recalled that Christoph was deeply critical of Nazi ideology, particularly its violations of human dignity. Christoph's father died by suicide in 1936 after a period of severe depression. Christoph was deeply affected by the loss and described it in a letter as feeling "as if my head has been torn off. Though he did not explicitly link this event to his later political stance, the experience is considered formative in his growing skepticism toward authoritarian ideologies.

== Friendship with Alexander Schmorell ==
Christoph Probst and Alexander Schmorell first met while attending the boarding school Landheim Schondorf, where they developed a close friendship grounded in shared intellectual interests and mutual respect. Years later, as medical students in Munich, their bond deepened. They often discussed literature, religion, and moral questions, and both were influenced by a strong sense of personal conscience and human dignity.

Schmorell's Russian Orthodox background and Probst's upbringing in a liberal, freethinking household created a shared space for ethical reflection that would eventually lead them into active resistance against the Nazi regime. Their conversations often revolved around the collapse of moral values under dictatorship, the role of faith, and the individual's responsibility in the face of injustice. Probst remained cautious about direct involvement in resistance activities due to his family obligations but was regarded as a full member of the White Rose inner circle. In February 1943, he contributed a draft for what would have become the group's seventh leaflet, composed in a moment of urgency during a hospital stay. This text, written in Probst’s own hand, was later found in Hans Scholl’s possession at the time of his arrest.

== University and family life ==
After completing his military service, Probst began studying medicine in Munich in 1939. In 1941, he married Herta Dohrn. The couple had three children together, Michael, Vincent and Katja.

Despite the demands of his growing family, Probst remained intellectually active and in close contact with fellow medical students Hans Scholl and Alexander Schmorell. Their shared interest in literature, music, and political-philosophical questions fostered a deepening bond. In the summer of 1942, Schmorell introduced Probst into the White Rose circle, recognizing his moral clarity and ability to express complex ideas in writing.

== The White Rose ==
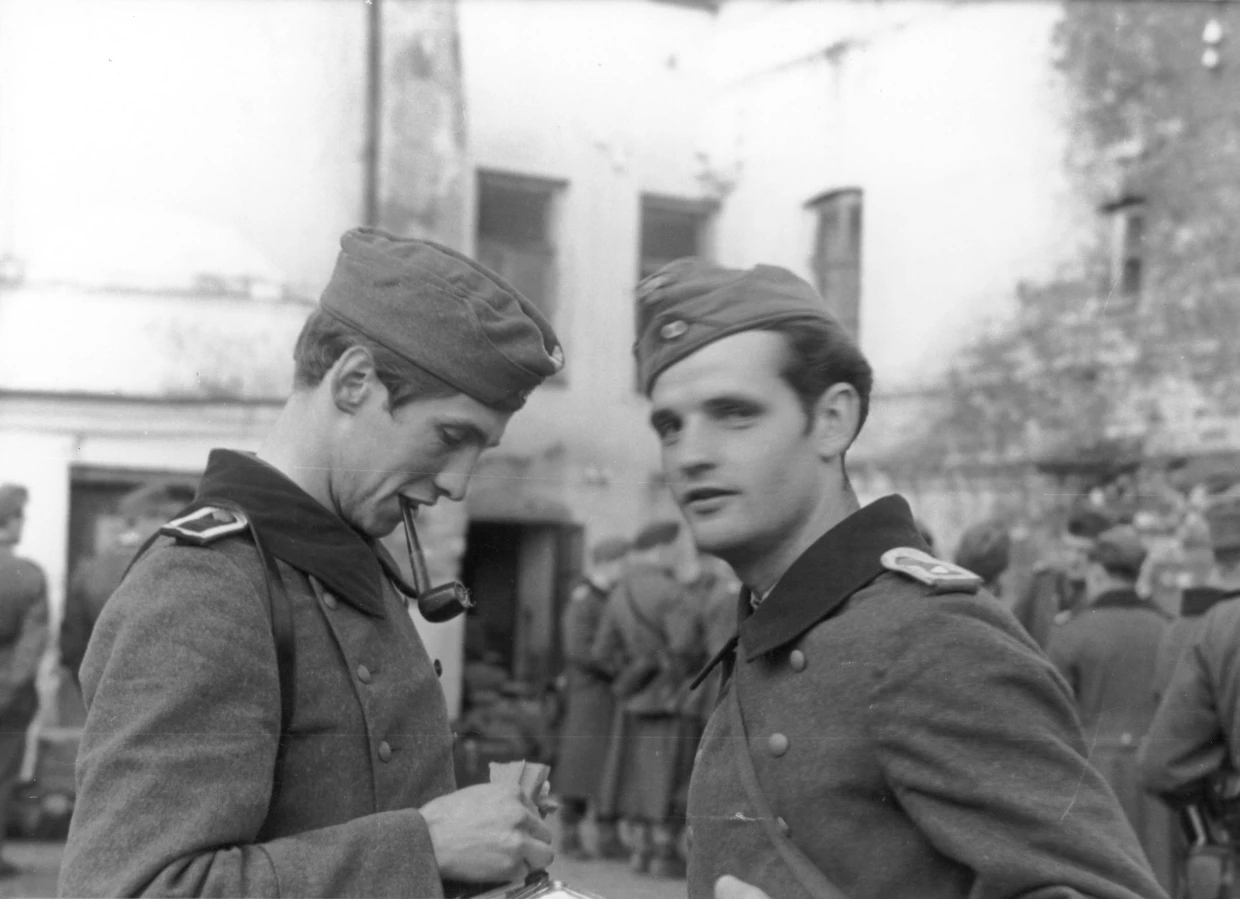
Hans Scholl and Alexander Schmorell, key members of the White Rose

The White Rose was the name of a resistance group in Munich during the Third Reich. The activities of the White Rose began in June 1942. From the end of that month until mid-July that same year, Hans Scholl and Alexander Schmorell wrote the group's first four leaflets. Quoting extensively from the Bible, Aristotle and Novalis, as well as Goethe and Schiller, the iconic poets of the German middle classes at the time, they appealed to what they considered the German intelligentsia, believing that the latter would be easily convinced by the same arguments that had appealed to themselves. The leaflets were left in telephone books in public phone booths, mailed to professors and students, and taken by courier to other universities for distribution.

Probst became involved with the core members of the White Rose through close friendships with Hans Scholl and Alexander Schmorell. From 1941 onward, he participated in their philosophical and political discussions, which gradually evolved into active resistance. Though he refrained from distributing leaflets himself due to concern for his family, he was considered part of the group’s inner circle by 1942. He contributed intellectually and later authored the draft for what would have become the group’s seventh leaflet, which was found in Hans Scholl’s possession at the time of his arrest.

Although Probst’s draft for a seventh leaflet was never distributed, the sixth leaflet, which Hans and Sophie Scholl had carried to the university on 18 February 1943, was later smuggled out of Germany via Scandinavia. It reached England through Oslo, where it was reproduced by the Allies and air-dropped over Germany in July 1943 under the title The Manifesto of the Students of Munich.

== Capture, trial and execution ==
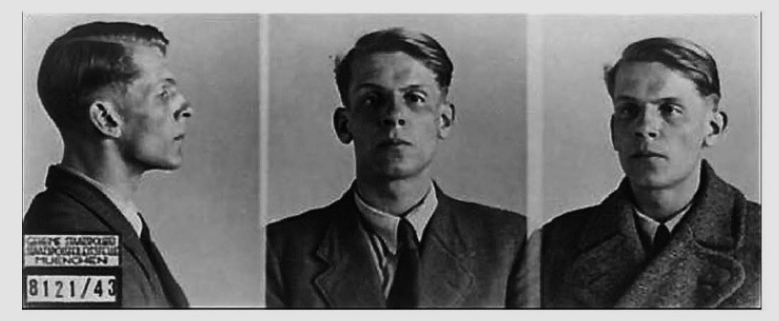
Probst's Gestapo identification photograph, February 1943

On 18 February 1943, Sophie and Hans Scholl went to the Ludwig-Maximilians-Universität München (LMU) to leave out flyers for the students to read. They were seen by Jakob Schmid, a janitor at the university who was also a Gestapo informer. Schmid alerted the Gestapo, who closed down the university until the Scholls could be apprehended. The draft of a seventh pamphlet that had been written by Christoph Probst was found in the possession of Hans Scholl at the time of his arrest by the Gestapo. While Sophie Scholl managed to get rid of incriminating evidence before being taken into custody, Hans attempted to destroy the draft leaflet by tearing it apart and swallowing it. However, the Gestapo recovered enough of it to read the contents of the leaflet. When pressed, Hans Scholl gave up the name of Christoph. As he said in his second interrogation:

The piece of paper that I tore up following my arrest this morning originated with Christoph Probst. He resides in Innsbruck, [and is with] an air force Student Company. I have been friends with Probst for several years. One day, I suggested to him that he should put his thoughts about current events in writing for me. This was after New Year 1942/43 when Probst visited me in Munich. We talked about this possibility at that time, namely in my apartment. Schmorel [sic], I, and Probst have comprised a circle of friends for years now. Schmorel [sic] was not present at this last meeting. He knows nothing of this entire matter. With regards to political matters, I exercised influence on Probst. Without my influence, he undoubtedly would never have reached these conclusions. I have withheld this acknowledgment for so long because Probst's wife is currently confined to bed with puerperal fever following the birth of their third child. He told me this himself, namely the last time that we met. I must say that I commissioned Probst to put his thoughts in writing a while ago. The last time we met – at the beginning of January 1943 – he gave me the piece of paper that I tore up today. I must expressly note that I said nothing to Probst about using his written notes for producing leaflets. I similarly assume that Probst was absolutely in the dark about the actions I had undertaken...All other persons with the exception of Probst are in my opinion not guilty.

On 20 February 1943, Probst went to pick up his salary before travelling to see his wife Herta and his newly born daughter, Katja. While in the office to collect his salary, he was apprehended by the Gestapo, who asked him to change into street clothes before taking him to prison. He had asked for clemency during interrogation. He also requested a trial for the sake of his wife and his three children, aged three and two years and four weeks old.

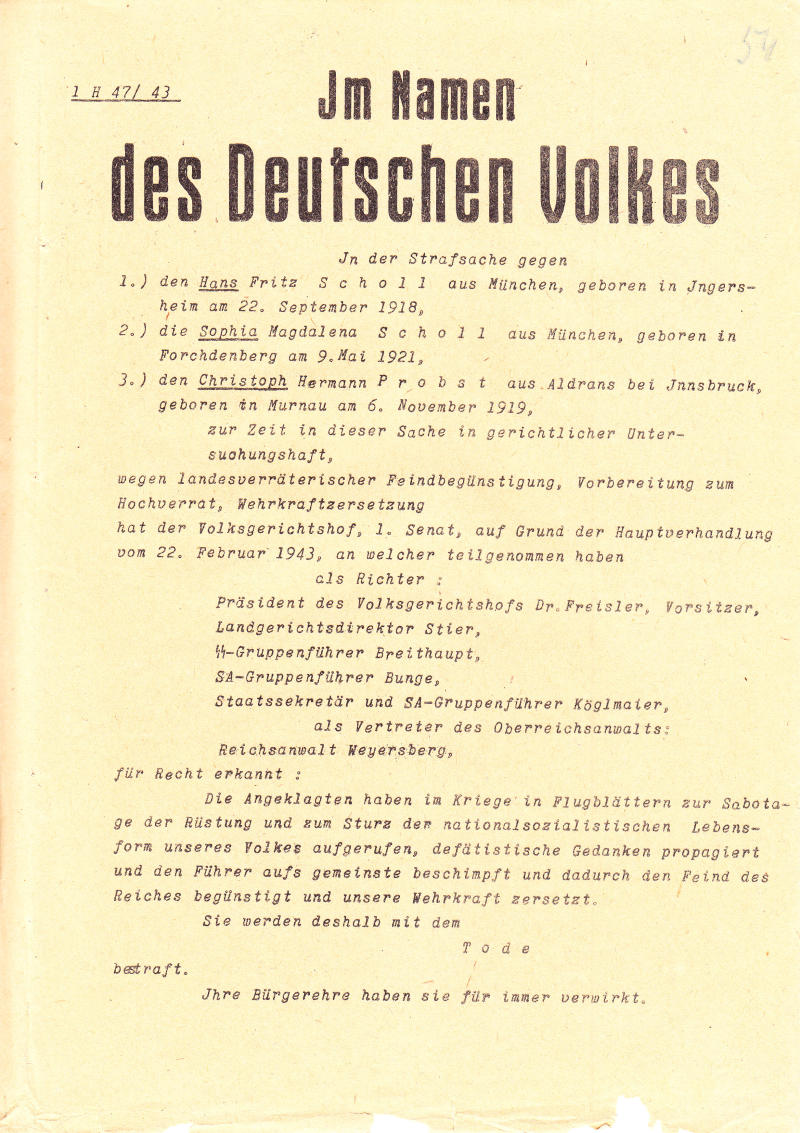
Excerpt from the Volksgerichtshof verdict against Christoph Probst and the Scholl siblings

On 22 February 1943, Probst, Sophie Scholl, and Hans Scholl were put to a trial before Judge Roland Freisler. The latter was known as the "Hanging judge" as about 90% of his trials ended in death sentences. At the conclusion of a trial lasting two hours, the accused were sentenced to death. They were originally scheduled to be executed by hanging in public, but the prison officials were worried that they would be made into political martyrs if their execution was public. Because of this, it was decided they would be guillotined. Shortly before his death, Christoph asked to be received into the Catholic Church, and was baptised a few minutes before his death. They were all beheaded by guillotine by executioner Johann Reichhart in Munich's Stadelheim Prison. Sophie was executed at 5:00 pm, while Hans was executed at 5:02 pm and Christoph was executed at 5:05 pm. The execution was supervised by Walter Roemer, the enforcement chief of the Munich district court. Prison officials were impressed by the condemned prisoners' bravery, and let them smoke cigarettes together before they were executed.

Probst's wife Herta was ill with childbed fever at the time. She was not informed of his capture, as the hospital nurses did not wish to alarm her. Herta helped write a petition for clemency the same day he was executed.

== Legacy ==
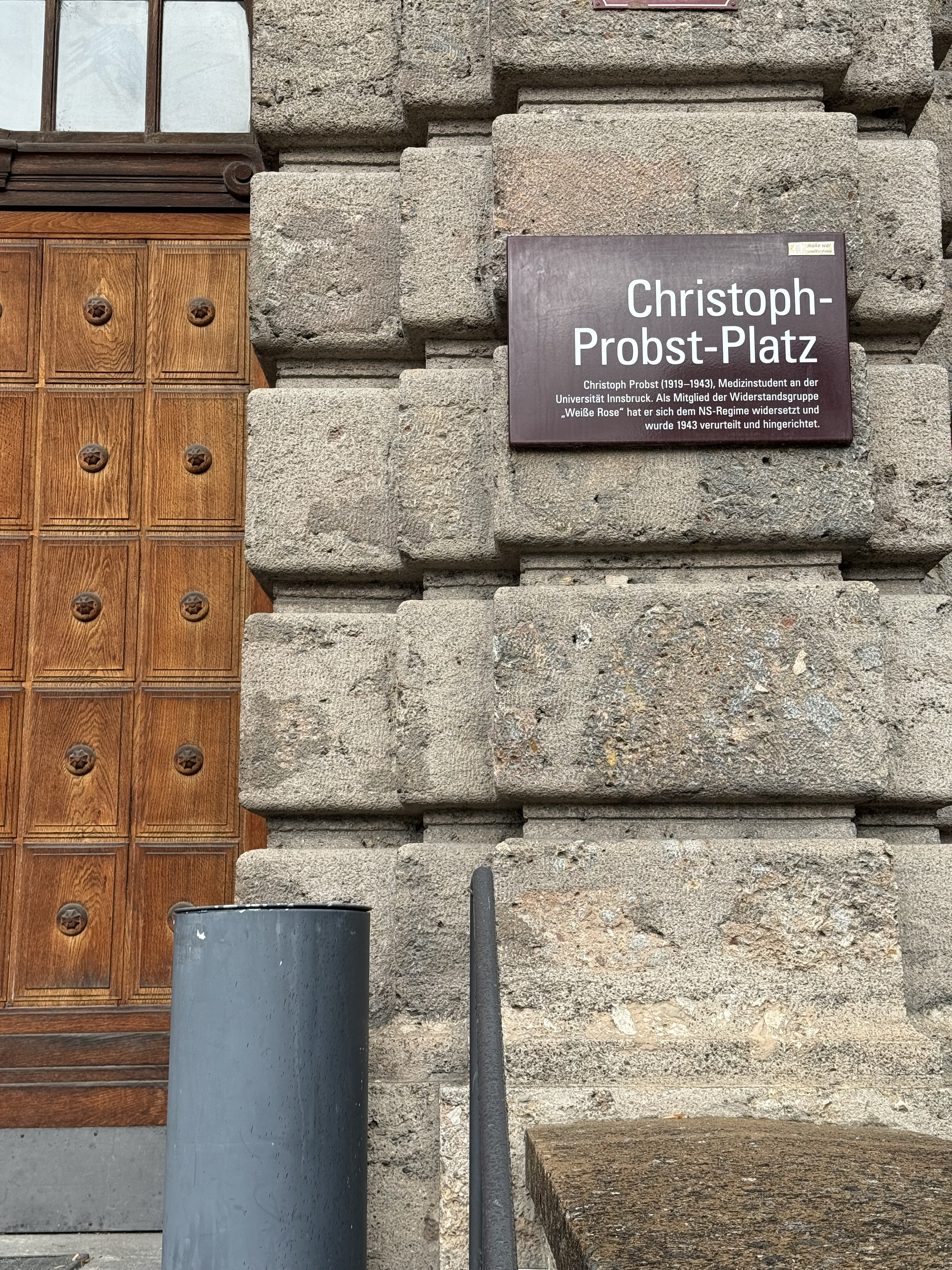
Square in front of Innsbruck University commemorating Probst who was a student of medicine here

The square in front of Innsbruck University bears his name and is called Christoph-Probst-Platz.

His grave is in the graveyard "Am Perlacher Forst", which is adjacent to the place of his execution. His mother Katharina Kleeblatt lies next to him.

On 3 November 1999, Christoph Probst was included in a semi-official commemorative book published by the German Catholic bishops. For his 100th birthday in 2019, the barracks of the Joint Medical Service of the Bundeswehr, north of Munich were named after him.

Several streets and institutions in Germany are named after Christoph Probst. Among the most notable:

- Christoph‑Probst‑Straße in Munich‑Schwabing‑Freimann, named in 1947 as part of the Studentenstadt expansion.
- Streets called ›Christoph‑Probst‑Straße‹ also exist in Leipzig‑Möckern, Cologne‑Longerich, Hamburg‑Eppendorf, Pfaffenhofen, Neusser‑Weckhoven, Dormagen‑Delhoven and Meilenhofen.

Several schools are named in his honour:

- Christoph‑Probst‑Gymnasium in Gilching (Bavaria), named in 1993;
- Christoph‑Probst‑Realschule in Neu‑Ulm (established 1959);
- Christoph‑Probst‑Mittelschule in Murnau am Staffelsee.

== In film ==
Christoph Probst was portrayed on film by Werner Stocker in Die Weiße Rose (1982) and by Florian Stetter in Sophie Scholl: The Final Days (2005).

== See also ==
- List of peace activists

== Bibliography ==
- Moll, Christiane, ed. (2011). Alexander Schmorell – Christoph Probst: Gesammelte Briefe. Berlin: Lukas Verlag. ISBN 9783867320658.
- Karin Amann, Thomas Ernst et al.: Die Weiße Rose – Gesichter einer Freundschaft. Arti Grafiche fiorin SpA, Mailand. (in German)
- Lilo Fürst-Ramdohr: Freundschaften in der Weißen Rose. Verlag Geschichtswerkstatt Neuhausen, München 1995, ISBN 3-931231-00-3. (in German)
- Jakob Knab: Die innere Vollendung der Person. Christoph Probst. In: Detlef Bald, Jakob Knab (Hrsg.): Die Stärkeren im Geiste. Zum christlichen Widerstand der Weißen Rose. Essen 2012. (in German)
- Christiane Moll (Hrsg.): Alexander Schmorell, Christoph Probst. Gesammelte Briefe. Lukas Verlag, Berlin 2011, ISBN 978-3-86732-065-8. (in German)
- Peter Normann Waage: Es lebe die Freiheit! – Traute Lafrenz und die Weiße Rose. Urachhaus, Stuttgart 2012, ISBN 978-3-8251-7809-3. (in German)
- Inge Scholl: Die Weiße Rose. Fischer Verlag, ISBN 3-596-11802-6. (in German)
- Robert Volkmann, Gernot Eschrich und Peter Schubert: …damit Deutschland weiterlebt. Christoph Probst 1919–1943. (Christoph-Probst-Gymnasium) Gilching 2000, ISBN 3-00-007034-6. (in German)
