= Johann Reichhart =

German executioner

- Born: 29 April 1893; Wichenbach near Wörth an der Donau, Kingdom of Bavaria, German Empire
- Died: 26 April 1972 (aged 78); Dorfen, Bavaria, West Germany
- Occupation: State judicial executioner

Johann Reichhart (29 April 1893 – 26 April 1972) was a German state-appointed judicial executioner in Bavaria from 1924 to 1946. During the Nazi period, he executed numerous people who were sentenced to death for their resistance to the German government. After the war, he was employed as executioner by the US Military Government in Germany. In total, he executed 3,165 people.

== Life and career ==
Johann Reichhart was born in Wichenbach near Wörth an der Donau into a family of Bavarian knackers and executioners, including his uncle Franz Xaver Reichhart and brother Michael, that went back eight generations to the mid-eighteenth century. His father (d. 1902) had a small farm on a remote land in Wichenbach near Tiefenthal (Wörth an der Donau) and took on extra work as a master knacker. Reichhart attended the Volks-school and vocational school in Wörth an der Donau, both of which he completed successfully. He then completed an apprenticeship as butcher, and served as a soldier in the First World War.

=== Beginnings as an executioner in the Weimar Republic ===
In April 1924, Reichhart took over the office of state judicial executioner in the Free State of Bavaria from his uncle Franz Xaver Reichhart (1851–1934), who retired at age 70. For each execution, Reichhart was paid 150 Goldmark plus ten marks for daily expenses, and given a third-class railway ticket. For executions in the Palatinate (Pfalz), he was dispatched by express train.

Executions decreased during 1924–1928, and Reichhart executed only 23 people (only one in 1928), and he had difficulty making a living for his family. He negotiated the right to take on other work domestically and abroad, and was released from the requirement of local residence. His business ventures failed, however; he gave up his wagon transport business in 1925, and in 1926 his inn at Mariahilfplatz. He sold Catholic treatises in Upper Bavaria as a traveling salesman. In 1928, he attempted but failed to resolve his contract with the Bavarian Ministry of Justice. He moved his residence to The Hague and became a successful independent greengrocer.

In the spring of 1931 and in July 1932, Reichhart travelled to Munich to carry out death sentences at Stadelheim Prison. In July 1932, several Dutch newspapers described his "other activities" and revealed his identity, which was normally kept incognito. As a result, Reichhart's business dwindled, and in the spring of 1933 he returned to Munich, where he considered ending his work as executioner.

=== National Socialism ===
On 22 June 1933, following the seizure of power by the National Socialists, Reichhart signed a new contract with the Bavarian Ministry of Justice. He now received a fixed, significantly higher annual salary, paid monthly. On 18 July 1933, following a request from the Ministry of Justice for Saxony, Reichhart was also authorized to execute in the state of Saxony and received a flat fee for "each occurrence". The guillotine (Fallschwertmaschine) and assistants were provided to him by the Free State of Saxony at the execution sites in Dresden and Weimar. In January 1934, the Bavarian judiciary raised his annual income to 3,720 Reichsmark, and he no longer needed to worry about his financial security.

From 1 September 1933, Reichhart joined the National Socialist Motor Corps (NSKK), the National Socialist War Victim's Care (NSKOV), the National Socialist People's Welfare (NSV), and the German Labour Front (DAF). In April 1937, he joined the Nazi Party (NSDAP).

The Reich Ministry of Justice (Reichsjustizministerium), by decree of 25 August 1937, reassigned its areas of responsibility and named three executioners. Ernst Reindel was responsible for the central execution sites in Berlin, Breslau, and Königsberg; Friedrich Hehr was responsible for executions in Butzbach, Hamburg, Hanover and Cologne; and Reichhart was named for executions in Munich, Dresden, Stuttgart, and Weimar. On 19 February 1939, after the Anschluss, the Reich Minister of Justice ordered a change of territories: Reichhart gave Weimar to Friedrich Hehr, and added Vienna and Frankfurt to his territories (Frankfurt replacing Butzbach). Reichhart temporarily suffered from depression.

During his service, Reichhart worked to accelerate the execution process and make it "less stressful" for convicted people. Beginning around 1939, he had the tipping board (bascule) on the guillotine replaced by a fixed bench. The condemned was held by his assistants, without restraint devices, until the hatchet blade was dropped. Reichhart abolished the black blindfold; instead, one of his assistants held the convict's eyes closed. These measures shortened the duration of the actual execution to 3–4 seconds (time specified by Johann Reichhart).

Reichhart also carried out executions in Cologne, Frankfurt-Preungesheim, Berlin-Plötzensee, Brandenburg-Görden, and Breslau, where central execution sites had also been constructed. From 1938 to 1944, he was also executioner for central execution sites in Vienna and Graz. From 1924, during the Weimar Republic and the period of National Socialism, he executed 2,951 people (250 of them women) via guillotine, and 59 by hanging. He also executed Hans Scholl and Sophie Scholl (d. 22 February 1943), members of the resistance group White Rose. Reichhart later said he had never seen anyone die as bravely as Sophie Scholl.

After the 20 July plot to assassinate Adolf Hitler in 1944, executions rose sharply. In December 1944, in the administrative divisions of central execution centres, Reichhart was designated as the executioner of the "execution centre for the execution district VIII", which included Munich-Stadelheim (Stadelheim Prison), Remand Prison Stuttgart and Penitentiary Bruchsal.

=== Executioner for the US Military Government ===
Reichhart, a member of the Nazi Party, was arrested by members of the United States Army in May 1945. American troops were planning to summarily execute him in Harlaching Cemetery, but were stopped from doing so at the last moment by an officer.

Reichhart spent one week in Stadelheim Prison for the purposes of denazification. He was not tried for carrying out his official duties as judicial executioner. He was subsequently employed by the U.S. Office of Military Government, until the end of May 1946, to help execute dozens of Nazi war criminals on the gallows at Landsberg am Lech. The technique required for this must have been known to him since 1942 at the latest, when he submitted a design proposal for British-style gallows with trapdoor (Long drop), which was rejected by the Reich Ministry of Justice. (Hanging had been introduced in Germany as an additional form of execution on 29 March 1933 by President Hindenburg after the Reichstag Fire; the method used was the Austro-Hungarian short drop pole method of strangulation hanging).

In August 1945, Reichhart was denounced to the Munich city administration: he would live comfortably in a villa and had several cars. Formally, he was still a judicial executioner of the Free State of Bavaria without acting in this capacity.

He subsequently retired as an executioner and served only as a consultant. According to some sources, he assisted American Master Sergeant John C. Woods in managing the gallows, and was commissioned by the United States Military Government to supervise the construction of the gallows in Nuremberg. Others claim that he was not in fact involved in the construction of the Nuremberg gallows. On 16 October 1946, Woods hanged the war criminals convicted in the Nuremberg trials, assisted by Joseph Malta. Reichhart assisted the U.S. military with the executions of Nazi war criminals at Landsberg Prison.

=== Post-executioner life ===
In May 1947, Reichhart was imprisoned for a second time. After a denazification trial process in Munich in December 1948, he was "incriminated" and sentenced to two years in a labour camp and confiscation of half of his assets. During his trial, Reichhart said, "I have carried out death sentences in the firm conviction that I should serve the state with my work, and to comply with lawfully enacted laws. I never doubted the legality of what I was doing." Following an appeal, the sentence was reduced to one and a half years and confiscation of 30% of his property. Since his time in custody by then exceeded the prison sentence, Reichhart was subsequently released. Reichhart's profession made him a lonely person. His marriage failed. His son, Hans, dispirited by his father's occupation and the denazification trial, committed suicide in 1950.

Impoverished and despised by many, Reichhart lived on a small military pension from the First World War. In 1963, during a series of murders of taxi drivers, when public demands increased for the reintroduction of capital punishment, Reichhart spoke against it.

Reichhart was temporarily confined in Algasing psychiatric hospital. He died on 26 April 1972, at a hospital in Dorfen, at the age of 78.

=== Aftermath ===
In early 2014, it was determined that a guillotine found at the Bavarian National Museum was likely the one which Reichhart had used to execute the Scholls.
