= Erhard Eppler =

German politician (1926–2019)

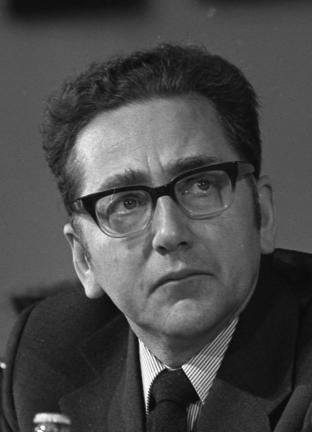

Minister for Economic Cooperation
- In office 16 October 1968 – 8 July 1974
- Chancellor: Kurt Georg Kiesinger; Willy Brandt; Helmut Schmidt
- Preceded by: Hans-Jürgen Wischnewski
- Succeeded by: Egon Bahr

Member of the Bundestag; from Baden-Württemberg
- In office 15 October 1961 – 14 December 1976
- Preceded by: Multi-member district
- Succeeded by: Egon Susset
- Constituency: State list (1961–1969); Heilbronn (1969–1976)

Member of the; Landtag of Baden-Württemberg; for Rottweil
- In office 2 June 1976 – 30 June 1982
- Preceded by: Constituency established
- Succeeded by: Klaus Haischer

Personal details
- Born: 9 December 1926 Ulm, Weimar Republic
- Died: 19 October 2019 (aged 92) Schwäbisch Hall, Germany
- Party: Social Democratic
- Other political affiliations: Nazi Party (1943–1945); All-German People's Party (1952–1956)
- Occupation: Teacher

Erhard Eppler (9 December 1926 – 19 October 2019) was a German politician of the Social Democratic Party (SPD) and founder of the Deutsche Gesellschaft für Technische Zusammenarbeit (GTZ). He studied English, German and history in Frankfurt, Bern and Tübingen, achieved a PhD and worked as a teacher. He met Gustav Heinemann in the late 1940s, who became a role model. Eppler was a member of the Bundestag from 1961 to 1976. He was appointed Minister for Economic Cooperation first in 1968 during the grand coalition of Kurt Georg Kiesinger (CDU) and Willy Brandt (SPD), continuing under Chancellor Brandt in 1969 and Chancellor Helmut Schmidt (SPD) in 1974, when he stepped down.

An early thinker on environmental sustainability and peace movements, Eppler was involved in various controversies within his party. He was president of the Deutscher Evangelischer Kirchentag (German Protestant Church Assembly) from 1981 to 1983 and again from 1989 to 1991.

== Early years ==
Born in Ulm on 9 December 1926, Eppler grew up in Schwäbisch Hall where his father was the headmaster of the local grammar school. His grandfather was pastor at the Ulmer Münster. During World War II, Eppler served from 1943 to 1945 in an anti-aircraft unit. He passed his Abitur in 1946, and studied English, German and history at the Frankfurt University, in Bern and in Tübingen. In 1951, he completed his PhD with a thesis on Elizabethan tragedy. He worked as a teacher at the Gymnasium in Schwenningen from 1953 until 1961.

== Eppler and political parties ==
Eppler became a member of the NSDAP in September 1943, at the age of 16. Later he spoke of this decision as "stupidity", but also said, "It wasn't against my will that I ended up on some list [of members of the NSDAP], but I accepted it. Things were like that in those times."

While he was studying in Bern at the end of the 1940s, Eppler got to know Gustav Heinemann, one of the founders of the Christian Democratic Union (CDU). Heinemann became Minister of the Interior from 1949 to 1950, but then left the cabinet, and later the CDU, together with several other party members who disagreed with Chancellor Konrad Adenauer's policy of complete integration into the Western world. Eppler joined Heinemann's new party, the All-German People's Party (Gesamtdeutsche Volkspartei), in 1952, but like most members of the GVP, including Heinemann, he changed over to the Social Democratic Party of Germany (SPD) in 1956.

For most of the time between 1970 and 1991 Eppler belonged to the SPD's National Executive Committee. He chaired an SPD commission on tax reform, and from 1973 to 1991 served on a commission for formulating the party's basic values (Grundwertekommission), where he supported opposition to atomic energy.

From 1973 to 1981 Eppler was the leader of the regional SPD in Baden-Württemberg. He was the SPD's candidate for the office of minister-president in that state, but his party was defeated by the CDU in two state elections.

== Member of parliament and minister ==
Eppler was a member of the Bundestag, the parliament of the Federal Republic of Germany, from 1961 to 1976.

On 16 October 1968, Eppler was appointed Minister for Economic Cooperation in the grand coalition government of Chancellor Kurt Georg Kiesinger (CDU) and Foreign Minister Willy Brandt (SPD). He continued in that office when Willy Brandt became Chancellor in 1969, but after his department was subject to severe budget cuts under the following Chancellor, Helmut Schmidt (SPD) in 1974, he stepped down in protest.

== Political views ==
Eppler has always been considered to be a proponent of the left within the SPD. During Gerhard Schröder's second term as Chancellor (2002–2005), however, he supported the government's economic and social reforms, which were widely criticized as neo-liberal (Agenda 2010). Moreover, although he had been close to the peace movement of the 1980s, he supported the foreign policy of the Schröder government and approved of German participation in the military interventions in Kosovo in 1999 and Afghanistan since 2001. He was an early adopter of views about ecological topics and environmental protection. In spite of his general loyalty to his party's leadership, he was especially unhappy with much of its economic policy during the party's time in power.

In his book Not much time for the Third World, Eppler was one of the first to point out the connections between environmental protection and international development.

== Social involvement ==
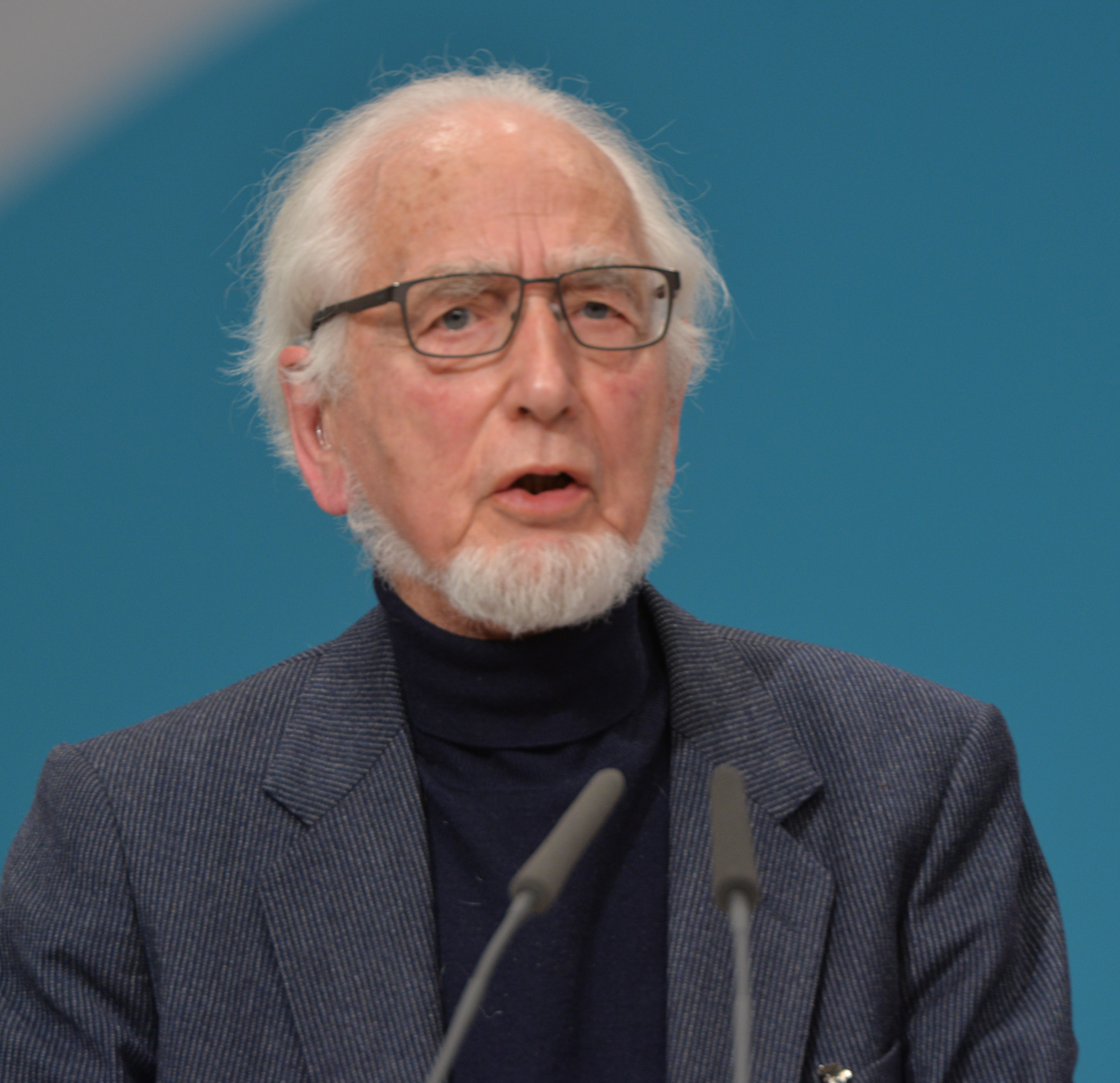
Eppler in 2015

After his withdrawal from federal politics, Eppler involved himself more in his work in the Protestant Church. From 1981 to 1983 and again from 1989 to 1991, he was president of the Deutscher Evangelischer Kirchentag (German Protestant Church Congress).

Eppler was also a member of the Wacholderhof Association, which promotes international cooperation, fair trade, and environmental sustainability. Eppler's numerous publications also show his political and social involvement. They deal with a wide range of subjects that concern not only the political situation in Germany and the economy but also general questions of developments in politics and society. In 2006, one of his books on the role of the state was honoured with the Das politische Buch 2006 prize of the Friedrich Ebert Foundation.

== Works ==
Eppler's books are held by the German National Library, including:

- Die tödliche Utopie der Sicherheit. Rowohlt, Reinbek bei Hamburg 1983, ISBN 3-498-01631-8.
- Plattform für eine neue Mehrheit. Ein Kommentar zum Berliner Programm der SPD (= Politik im Taschenbuch. Band 1). Dietz, Bonn 1990, ISBN 3-8012-0158-9.
- Kavalleriepferde beim Hornsignal. Die Krise der Politik im Spiegel der Sprache (= Edition Suhrkamp 1788 = NF 788). Suhrkamp, Frankfurt am Main 1992, ISBN 3-518-11788-2.
- Privatisierung der politischen Moral? (= Edition Suhrkamp. Standpunkte 2185). Suhrkamp, Frankfurt am Main 2000, ISBN 3-518-12185-5.
- Komplettes Stückwerk. Erfahrungen aus fünfzig Jahren Politik. Insel-Verlag, Frankfurt am Main u. a. 1996, ISBN 3-458-16770-6.
- Eine Partei für das zweite Jahrzehnt: die SPD? Vorwärts-Buch, Berlin 2008, ISBN 978-3-86602-175-4.
- Der Politik aufs Maul geschaut. Kleines Wörterbuch zum öffentlichen Sprachgebrauch. Dietz, Bonn 2009, ISBN 978-3-8012-0397-9.
- Eine solidarische Leistungsgesellschaft. Epochenwechsel nach der Blamage der Marktliberalen. Dietz, Bonn 2011, ISBN 978-3-8012-0422-8.
- Links leben. Erinnerungen eines Wertkonservativen. Propyläen Verlag, Berlin 2015, ISBN 978-3-549-07465-7.
