= Inge Scholl =

German activist

Inge Aicher-Scholl
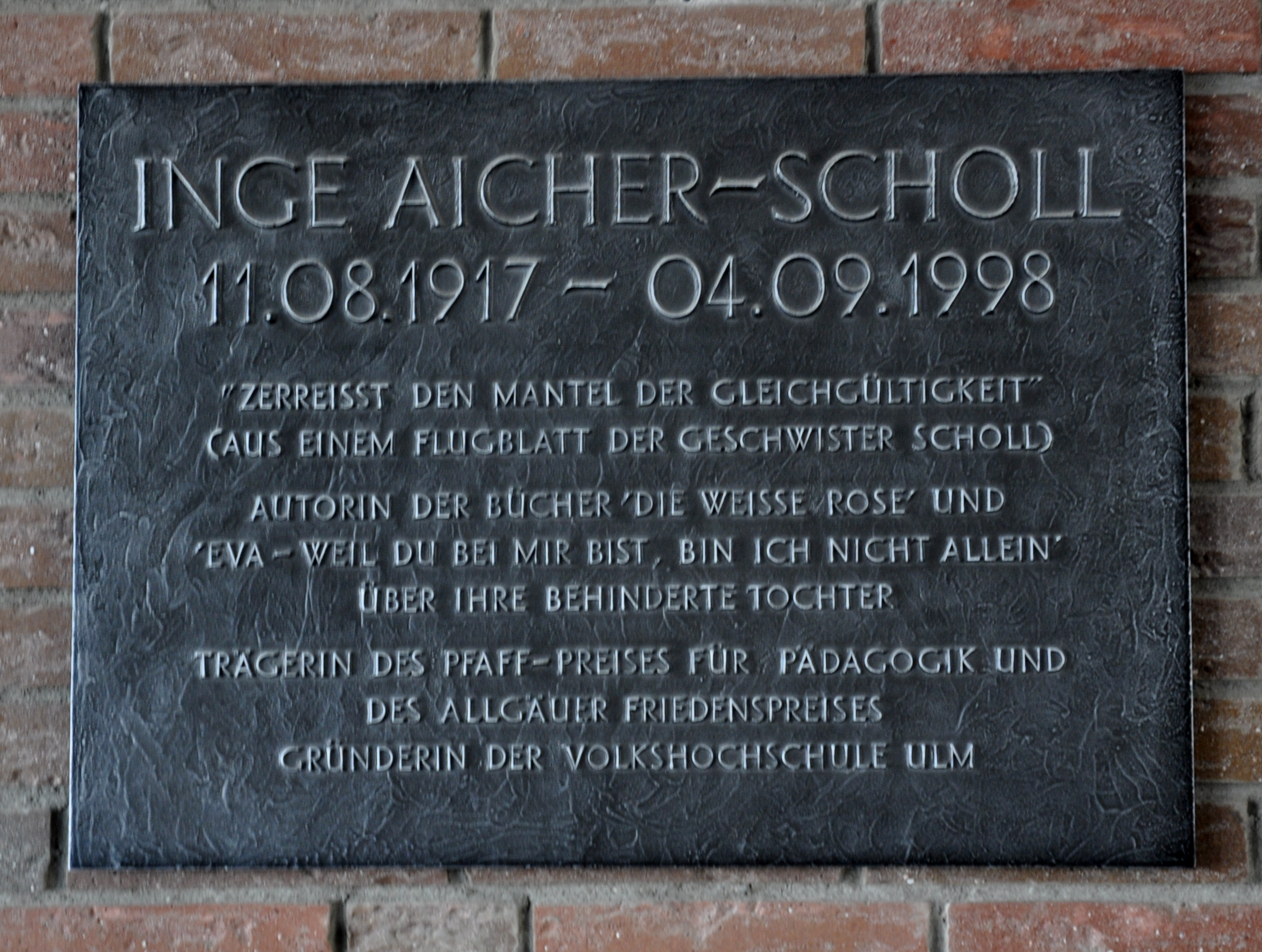
- Commemorative plaque to Inge Aicher-Scholl
- Born: Inge Scholl; 11 August 1917; Ingersheim (Crailsheim), German Empire
- Died: 4 September 1998 (aged 81); Leutkirch im Allgäu, Germany
- Spouse: Otl Aicher (m. 1952; died 1991)
- Parent(s): Robert Scholl; Magdalena Müller
- Relatives: Hans Scholl (brother); Sophie Scholl (sister); Werner Scholl (brother); Elisabeth Hartnagel (sister)

Inge Aicher-Scholl (11 August 1917, Crailsheim – 4 September 1998, Leutkirch im Allgäu) was a German writer, founder and director of the Ulm Adult Education Center (1946–1978), and co-founder of the Ulm School of Design.

== The White Rose and the Scholl family during the war ==
Inge Aicher-Scholl was the daughter of Robert Scholl, mayor of Forchtenberg, and elder sister of Hans and Sophie Scholl, who studied at the Ludwig-Maximilians-Universität München in 1942, and were core members of the White Rose student resistance movement in Nazi Germany. Inge Scholl wrote several books about the White Rose after the war.

The White Rose was a student group who printed and distributed leaflets highly critical of Nazi war crimes, particularly against the Jews on the eastern front. They said the war could not be won and were mostly active after the Wehrmacht's disastrous reverse at the Battle of Stalingrad and the collapse of Operation Barbarossa. They warned that the German people might become "forever the nation hated and rejected by all mankind". Sophie and Hans were caught distributing the leaflets, tried for treason and executed by guillotine, along with another White Rose member, Christoph Probst. Inge and other Scholl family members were arrested and interrogated, but later released.

== After the war ==
In 1952, Inge published her first book about the White Rose, titled Die Weiße Rose; it was the first book ever written about the White Rose. Since its publishing, it has been translated into multiple languages.

Inge, her husband Otl Aicher, and Max Bill (a former student at the Bauhaus) founded the Ulm School of Design in Ulm, Germany in 1953. She was heavily involved in the peace movement in the later half of the 20th century. She died of cancer on 4 September 1998 in Leutkirch im Allgäu.
