= Werner Scholl =

German soldier and resistance member (1922–1944)

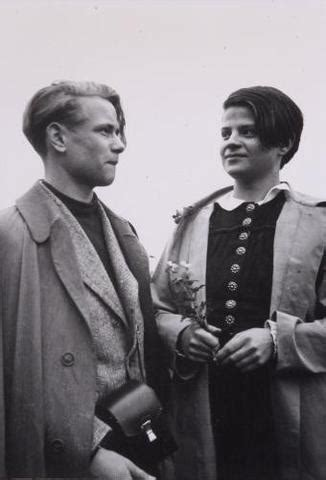
- Werner Scholl (left) with his sister Sophie
- Born: November 13, 1922; Germany
- Disappeared: June 1944; Soviet Union
- Known for: Younger brother of Hans and Sophie Scholl

Werner Scholl (born November 13, 1922, declared missing in action in June 1944) was the younger brother of Hans and Sophie Scholl, who are best known for their resistance to Nazism as part of the White Rose.

== Early life ==
Werner Scholl was born on November 13, 1922. He was the fifth out of six children (one of whom would die in infancy):

- Inge Scholl (1917–1998)
- Hans Scholl (1918–1943)
- Elisabeth Scholl (1920–2020)
- Sophie Scholl (1921–1943)
- Werner Scholl
- Thilde Scholl (1925–1926)

Like his siblings, Werner joined the Hitler Youth when Hitler came to power. In 1936, Werner, Sophie, and Inge were arrested by the Gestapo. After being held for a few weeks, Werner was released, but the imprisonment left a mark on him.

In the summer of 1939, Werner became the first member of the Scholl family to openly resist the Nazi regime when he resigned from the Hitler Youth, a decision that barred him from being able to take the Abitur. Werner also climbed on top of the statue of Justice at the Courtroom in Ulm to blindfold the Lady of Justice with a swastika flag.

== Service during the War ==
Werner Scholl was drafted into the Reich Labour Service in 1941, immediately after graduating from high school. He was later brought into the Wehrmacht, where he served as a medical officer.

In 1942, Werner was sent out to the Russian front, where, by chance, he was stationed near Hans. The two were able to see each other fairly often.

== White Rose Trial ==
In February 1943, Werner was given leave to go home to Ulm. When he came home, he found out that Sophie and Hans had been captured by the Gestapo. Along with his parents, Werner travelled to Munich for the trial on 22 February, storming into the courtroom just as Roland Freisler was about to give the verdict. After a brief stand-off, the Scholl parents were removed from the room. Because Werner had an army uniform on, he was able to blend in with the crowd and be there when the judge announced the guilty verdict. As those in the courtroom got up to leave, Werner was able to see Hans and Sophie one last time and take their hands. Hans said to him, "Stay strong. Make no concessions!" Later that day, his parents were able to see Hans and Sophie again, but Werner was not. After helping Traute Lafrenz clear out incriminating evidence from Sophie and Hans' living quarters, Werner and his parents then left Munich, distraught but hopeful that they could petition for clemency. They were unaware that Sophie and Hans had already been executed at 5:00 pm. A few days later, when Fritz Hartnagel came to Munich after learning of Sophie's arrest, it was Werner who broke the news to him that Sophie had already been executed.

Soon after, the entire Scholl family was arrested, with the exception of Werner, who had gone back to the Russian front soon after Hans and Sophie's execution. The family members were arrested because of Sippenhaft, the assumption of shared family guilt. Sippenhaft was a major deterrent for anyone considering resisting the Nazi Regime; if they were captured, not only would they suffer, but their family would too.

== Disappearance ==
In June 1944, the Scholl family received word that Werner was classified as missing in action. His body was never found, so it is assumed that he died on the Soviet front. He was 21.

== See also ==
- List of people who disappeared mysteriously: 1910–1990
