= Elisabeth Hartnagel-Scholl =

German centenarian

Elisabeth Hartnagel (27 February 1920 – 28 February 2020) was the sister of anti-Nazi activists Hans and Sophie Scholl.

== Life ==
Elisabeth Scholl grew up together with her siblings Inge (1917–1998), Hans (1918–1943), Sophie (1921–1943), Werner (1922–1944), and Thilde Scholl (1925-1926), as well as half-brother Ernst Gruele (1915–1991). Until 1930 the family lived in Forchtenberg, from 1930 to 1932 in Ludwigsburg, and after 1932 in Ulm. She was educated in Christian values by her mother Magdalena (1881–1958), who had been a deaconess until her marriage, and her father Robert Scholl, a liberal. Her siblings initially enthusiastically followed National Socialism and were members of the League of German Girls or Hitler Youth, but later became disillusioned with the Nazi Regime.

== Scholl arrest and Sippenhaft ==
Her siblings Hans and Sophie as well as other students participated in the production and distribution of leaflets of the student resistance group White Rose. They were arrested on February 18, 1943. Elisabeth found this out from the newspaper. Four days later, on February 22, Hans and Sophie Scholl and their fellow student Christoph Probst were sentenced to death in Munich by the People's Court chaired by Judge Roland Freisler, who came from Berlin for the sole purpose of the trial. Around 5 p.m., the convicts were beheaded in Munich's Stadelheim Prison. At the funeral of Hans and Sophie Scholl on February 24, the parents and siblings Inge, Elisabeth and Werner were present. Three days later, on Elisabeth's 23rd birthday, the entire Scholl family was taken into custody in Ulm, except for brother Werner, who was on his way back to the Soviet front after his home leave. Elisabeth Scholl fell seriously ill in "protective detention" and was released after two months. She was the first of the Scholls to be released from prison.

== After the war ==
In October 1945, she married Fritz Hartnagel (1917–2001). Fritz had been Sophie's fiancé, and after the execution, Fritz and Elisabeth had been brought together from their shared grief at their loss. Together the couple had four children. After the death of her sister Inge Aicher-Scholl in 1998, Elisabeth began to speak about her siblings at schools and other educational institutions. She was committed to keeping the memory of her brother and sister alive. She died on 28 February 2020, one day after her hundredth birthday.
