= Fritz Hartnagel =

German soldier and judge

- Born: February 4, 1917
- Died: April 29, 2001 (aged 84)
- Known for: Fiance of Sophie Scholl; Lawyer and Soldier of the Wehrmacht during World War II

Friedrich "Fritz" Hartnagel (February 4, 1917 – April 29, 2001) was a lawyer and soldier of the Wehrmacht during World War II. In the 1950s, Hartnagel, then a judge in Stuttgart, campaigned against the rearmament of the Federal Republic. He was Sophie Scholl's fiancé.

== Life ==
Fritz Hartnagel was born to Friedrich Hartnagel (1879–1957) and Barbara Hartnagel née Strobl (1878–1945) on February 4, 1917. When Hitler first came to power, Hartnagel was entranced by him and his vision for Germany. He volunteered for an officer career in the spring of 1936 after an early Abitur and was a professional officer of the Wehrmacht until the end of World War II.

== Relationship with Sophie Scholl ==
In 1937, Hartnagel met Sophie Scholl at a dance event. Under Scholl's influence and after experiences on the front (including in the Battle of Stalingrad), Hartnagel changed from an enthusiastic soldier to an opponent of war and Nazi dictatorship. He supported the resistance activities with news about the course of the war and war crimes and with amounts of money (including 1,000 ℛ︁ℳ︁) although he never officially joined any resistance movements.

Hartnagel was not made aware that Sophie Scholl had been arrested until he received a letter from Sophie's mother. When he learned of the arrest, he immediately checked himself out of the hospital in occupied Poland he was in (he suffered frostbite in Russia, which had led to a partial amputation of his hand) and raced to Munich. While at a stop in Berlin, he telephoned the Scholls' house to find out if there were any more details available about her arrest. The phone was answered by Werner Scholl, who had to break the news that Sophie had been executed the day before.

After the execution of Hans and Sophie on February 22, 1943, Hartnagel assisted the Scholl family. After the remaining members of the Scholl family were put into Sippenhaft (kinship arrest), Hartnagel appealed for clemency for them. After they were released, he supported them financially.

== After the War ==
On April 14, 1945, Hartnagel was captured by US troops and kept as a prisoner of war until September 1945. In October 1945, he married Sophie's sister Elisabeth Scholl, with whom he had grown close after Sophie's execution. Together, they had four boys.

In 1946, Hartnagel began law studies at the Ludwig-Maximilians-Universität München (LMU) in Munich (the same university Sophie Scholl had gone to). He completed his studies and became a judge. He died on April 29, 2001, at the age of 84.

== Legacy ==
After his death, the letters between him and Sophie were compiled and published. His and Sophie's story was also the basis for the novel “With you there is light”, published in 2016.
