= Sophie Scholl =

German anti-Nazi student activist (1921–1943)

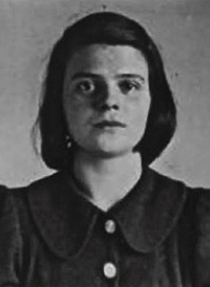
- Gestapo photograph of Scholl, 18 February 1943
- Born: Sophia Magdalena Scholl; 9 May 1921; Forchtenberg, Weimar Republic
- Died: 22 February 1943 (aged 21); Stadelheim Prison, Munich, Nazi Germany
- Cause of death: Execution by guillotine
- Resting place: Cemetery at Perlacher Forst, Munich, Germany; 48.09734°N 11.59949°E
- Education: Ludwig-Maximilians-Universität München
- Occupations: Student, political activist
- Father: Robert Scholl
- Relatives: Inge Scholl (sister); Hans Scholl (brother); Elisabeth Hartnagel (sister); Werner Scholl (brother)

Sophia Magdalena Scholl (Note: German: [zoˈfiː makdaˈleːna ˈʃɔl]) (9 May 1921 – 22 February 1943) was a German student and anti-Nazi political activist, active in the White Rose non-violent resistance group in Nazi Germany.

Raised in a politically engaged family, Scholl initially joined the Bund Deutscher Mädel, the female branch of the Hitler Youth, but later became critical of the Nazi regime. Influenced by philosophy, theology, and the writings of Theodor Haecker, she became involved in passive resistance efforts alongside her brother, Hans, and fellow students. The White Rose distributed leaflets calling for opposition to the Nazi state, citing ethical and philosophical arguments against its policies. In February 1943, after being caught distributing leaflets at the Ludwig-Maximilians-Universität München, she and her brother Hans were arrested by the Gestapo, interrogated, and convicted of high treason in a show trial presided over by Roland Freisler. They were sentenced to death and executed by guillotine.

After her death, copies of the final White Rose leaflet were air-dropped over Germany by the Allies. In the decades following her death, numerous schools, streets, and memorials have been named in her and her brother's honor for their role in anti-Nazi resistance. Her story has been depicted in several films, books, and other media, including the Oscar nominated film Sophie Scholl – The Final Days.

== Early life ==
Scholl was the daughter of Magdalena (née Müller) and Robert Scholl, a liberal politician and ardent Nazi critic, who was the mayor of her home town of Forchtenberg am Kocher in the Free People's State of Württemberg at the time of her birth. She was the fourth of six children:

1. Inge Aicher-Scholl (1917–1998)
2. Hans Scholl (1918–1943)
3. Elisabeth Hartnagel (née Scholl) (27 February 1920 – 28 February 2020), married Sophie's long-term boyfriend, Fritz Hartnagel
4. Sophie Scholl (1921–1943)
5. Werner Scholl (1922–1944) missing in action and presumed dead in June 1944
6. Thilde Scholl (1925–1926)

She started school at the age of seven, learned easily, and had a carefree childhood. In 1930, the family moved to Ludwigsburg and then two years later to Ulm where her father had a business consulting office.

Scholl was brought up in the Lutheran church and remained a devout Christian the rest of her life. In 1942 she famously wrote, "I shall cling to the rope God has thrown me in Jesus Christ, even if my numb hands can no longer feel it."

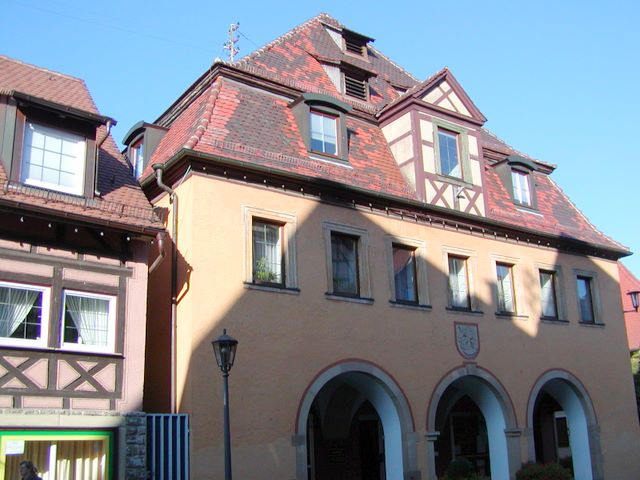
The Town Hall in Forchtenberg, the birthplace of Sophie Scholl

In 1932, Scholl began attending a secondary school for girls. At the age of 12, she joined the female branch of the Hitler Youth, Bund Deutscher Mädel (League of German Girls), as did most of her classmates. Her initial enthusiasm gradually gave way to criticism. She was aware of the dissenting political views of her father, friends, and some teachers. Her brother Hans, who had at first participated enthusiastically in the Hitler Youth program, became entirely disillusioned with the Nazi Party. Political positions had become an essential criterion in her choice of friends. The arrest of her brothers and friends in 1937 for participating in the German Youth Movement left a strong impression on her.

An avid reader, she developed a growing interest in philosophy and theology. She had a talent for drawing and painting, and came into contact with a few so-called "degenerate" artists. All of the Scholl children had a deep interest in art, and befriended many artists of the time, particularly controversial ones who stood against National Socialism and explored such themes in their work. One such artist, Otl Aicher, helped Sophie learn to sketch and helped her revise her drawings. He later married her sister Inge.

Sophie was first arrested by the Gestapo at the age of 16, after her brother Hans was discovered to be active in an anti-Hitler Youth group called Deutsche Jungenschaft vom 1.11.1929. The Gestapo arrested Hans at his military post and other security agents arrested his siblings Inge, Werner and Sophie at their home shortly thereafter. Sophie was released later the same day, while Inge and Werner were jailed for a week. Hans spent a full three weeks in prison where he underwent interrogation. He was released only after the intervention of his cavalry officer. This experience further solidified Sophie's anti-Nazi convictions.

In spring of 1940 she graduated from secondary school, where the subject of her essay was "The Hand that Moved the Cradle, Moved the World, a poem by William Ross Wallace". Scholl almost did not graduate, having lost all interest in participating in classes that had largely become Nazi indoctrination. Being fond of children, she became a kindergarten teacher at the Fröbel Institute in Ulm. She also chose that job in the hope that it would be recognized as an alternative service in the Reichsarbeitsdienst (National Labor Service), a prerequisite for admission to university. This was not the case, and in spring of 1941 she began a six-month stint in the auxiliary war service as a nursery school teacher in Blumberg. The quasi military regimen of the Labor Service caused her to rethink her understanding of the political situation and to begin practising passive resistance.

After her six months in the National Labor Service, she enrolled in May 1942 in the Ludwig-Maximilians-Universität München as a student of biology and philosophy. Her brother Hans, who was studying medicine at the same institution, introduced her to his friends. Although this group of friends eventually became known for their political views, they were initially drawn together by a shared love of art, music, literature, philosophy, and theology. Hiking in the mountains, skiing, and swimming were also important to them. They often attended concerts, plays and lectures together.

In Munich, Scholl met a number of artists, writers and philosophers, particularly Carl Muth and Theodor Haecker. The question they pondered most was how the individual must act under a dictatorship. During the summer of 1942, Scholl had to do war service in a metalworking plant in Ulm. At the same time, her father was serving time in prison for having made a critical remark to an employee about Adolf Hitler.

== Origins of the White Rose ==
Between 1940 and 1941, Sophie Scholl's brother Hans, a former member of the Hitler Youth, began questioning the principles and policies of the Nazi regime. As a student at the Ludwig-Maximilians-Universität München, Hans met two Roman Catholic men of letters who gave him a new orientation in life, inspiring him to turn from studying medicine to the pursuit of religion, philosophy and the arts. Together with like-minded friends, Alexander Schmorell, Willi Graf and Jurgen Wittenstein, he eventually adopted a strategy of passive resistance toward the Nazis by writing and publishing leaflets that called for the overthrow of National Socialism. The anonymous authors called themselves the "White Rose".

The activities of the White Rose began in June 1942. By mid-July 1942, Hans Scholl and Alexander Schmorell had written the first four leaflets. Quoting extensively from the Bible, Aristotle, and Novalis, as well as Goethe and Schiller, the iconic poets of the German bourgeoisie, they appealed to what they considered the German intelligentsia, believing that such people would be easily convinced by the same arguments that motivated the authors themselves. The leaflets were left in the telephone books in public telephone booths, mailed to professors and students, and taken by courier to other universities for further distribution.

Sophie is believed to have first learned about the White Rose in July 1942, but Fritz Hartnagel remembers her asking him in May 1942 if he could get her a pass to buy a duplicating machine (which could not be obtained in Nazi Germany except by permit), which suggests that she may have known about the activities earlier. Her participation proved to be valuable to the group because, as a woman, she was less likely to be randomly stopped by the SS.

== Arrest and execution ==
On 18 February 1943, Sophie and Hans Scholl went to the Ludwig-Maximilians-Universität München to leave flyers out for the students to read. The Scholls brought a suitcase full of leaflets to the university main building, and hurriedly dropped stacks of copies in the empty corridors for students to find when they left the lecture rooms. Leaving before the lectures had ended, the Scholls had some copies left in the suitcase and decided to distribute them. Sophie flung the last remaining leaflets from the top floor down into the atrium. This spontaneous action was observed by the university maintenance man, Jakob Schmid, a self-avowed Nazi, who had joined the Nazi Party in 1937.

Hans and Sophie Scholl were taken into custody by the Gestapo. A draft of a seventh pamphlet, written by Christoph Probst, was found in the possession of Hans Scholl at the time of his arrest. While Sophie Scholl was able to hide incriminating evidence in an empty classroom just before being captured, Hans tried to destroy the draft of the last leaflet by tearing it apart and swallowing it. The Gestapo recovered enough of it to read what it said and, when pressed, Hans gave the name of the author, Christoph Probst. In the record of his second interrogation, he stated, "The piece of paper that I tore up following my arrest this morning originated with Christoph Probst. ... All other persons with the exception of Probst are in my opinion not guilty." Christoph Probst was captured on 20 February 1943.

The main Gestapo interrogator was Robert Mohr, who initially thought Sophie was innocent. However, after Hans had confessed, Sophie assumed full responsibility in an attempt to protect other members of the White Rose.

In court before Judge Roland Freisler on 22 February 1943, Scholl was recorded as saying these words:

Somebody, after all, had to make a start. What we wrote and said is also believed by many others. They just don't dare express themselves as we did.

This was their only defense; they were not allowed to call witnesses.

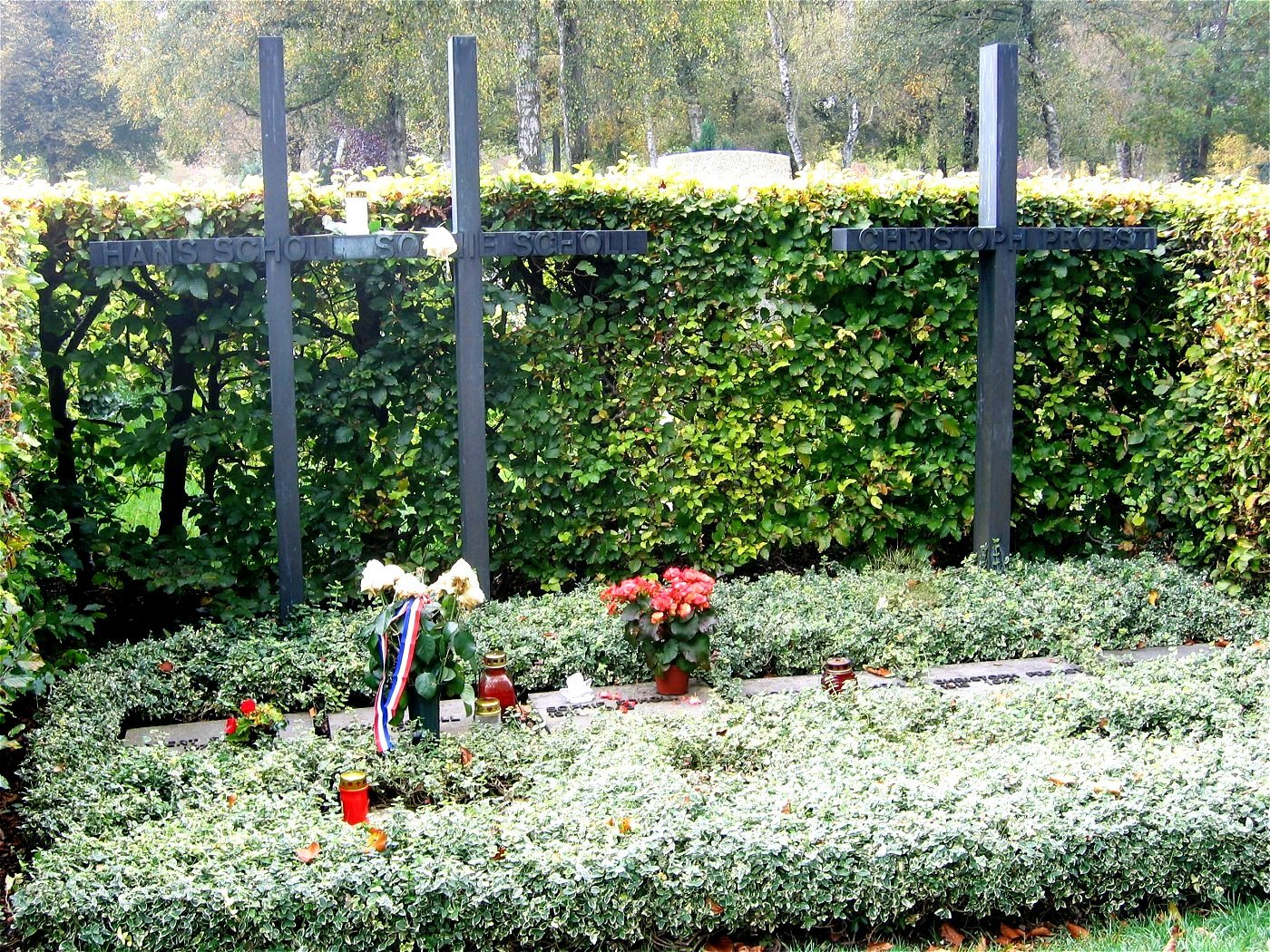
The grave of Hans Scholl, Sophie Scholl and Christoph Probst in the Perlacher Forst cemetery, near Stadelheim prison in Munich.

On 22 February 1943, Scholl, her brother Hans, and their friend Christoph Probst were found guilty of treason and sentenced to death. They were all beheaded by guillotine by the executioner Johann Reichhart in Munich's Stadelheim Prison. Sophie was executed at 5:00 p.m., Hans at 5:02 p.m. and Christoph at 5:05 p.m. The execution was supervised by Walter Roemer, the head of enforcement of the Munich district court. Prison officials were impressed by the condemned prisoners' bravery, and let them smoke cigarettes together before they were executed.

Sophie's last known words are disputed, although her cellmate during her pre-trial custody in Wittelsbacher Palais, Else Gebel, remembers the last words Sophie said to her as:

How can we expect righteousness to prevail when there is hardly anyone willing to give himself up individually to a righteous cause. ... It is such a splendid sunny day, and I have to go. But how many have to die on the battlefield in these days, how many young, promising lives. What does my death matter if by our acts thousands are warned and alerted. Among the student body there will certainly be a revolt.

As for her last words, they were most likely either "God, my refuge unto eternity" or "The sun still shines."

Fritz Hartnagel was evacuated from Stalingrad in January 1943, but failed to reach Munich before Sophie was executed. In October 1945, he married Sophie's sister Elisabeth.

== Legacy ==
After Scholl's death, a copy of the sixth leaflet was smuggled out of Germany through Scandinavia to England by the German jurist Helmuth James Graf von Moltke, where it was used by the Allied Forces. In mid-1943, the Royal Air Force dropped millions of copies of the tract, retitled The Manifesto of the Students of Munich, over Germany as propaganda.

The playwright Lillian Garrett-Groag said in Newsday on 22 February 1993, "It is possibly the most spectacular moment of resistance that I can think of in the twentieth century. ... The fact that five little kids, in the mouth of the wolf, where it really counted, had the tremendous courage to do what they did, is spectacular to me. I know that the world is better for them having been there, but I do not know why."

In the same issue of Newsday, the Holocaust historian Jud Newborn observed, "You cannot really measure the effect of this kind of resistance in whether or not X number of bridges were blown up or a regime fell. ... The White Rose really has a more symbolic value, but that's a very important value."

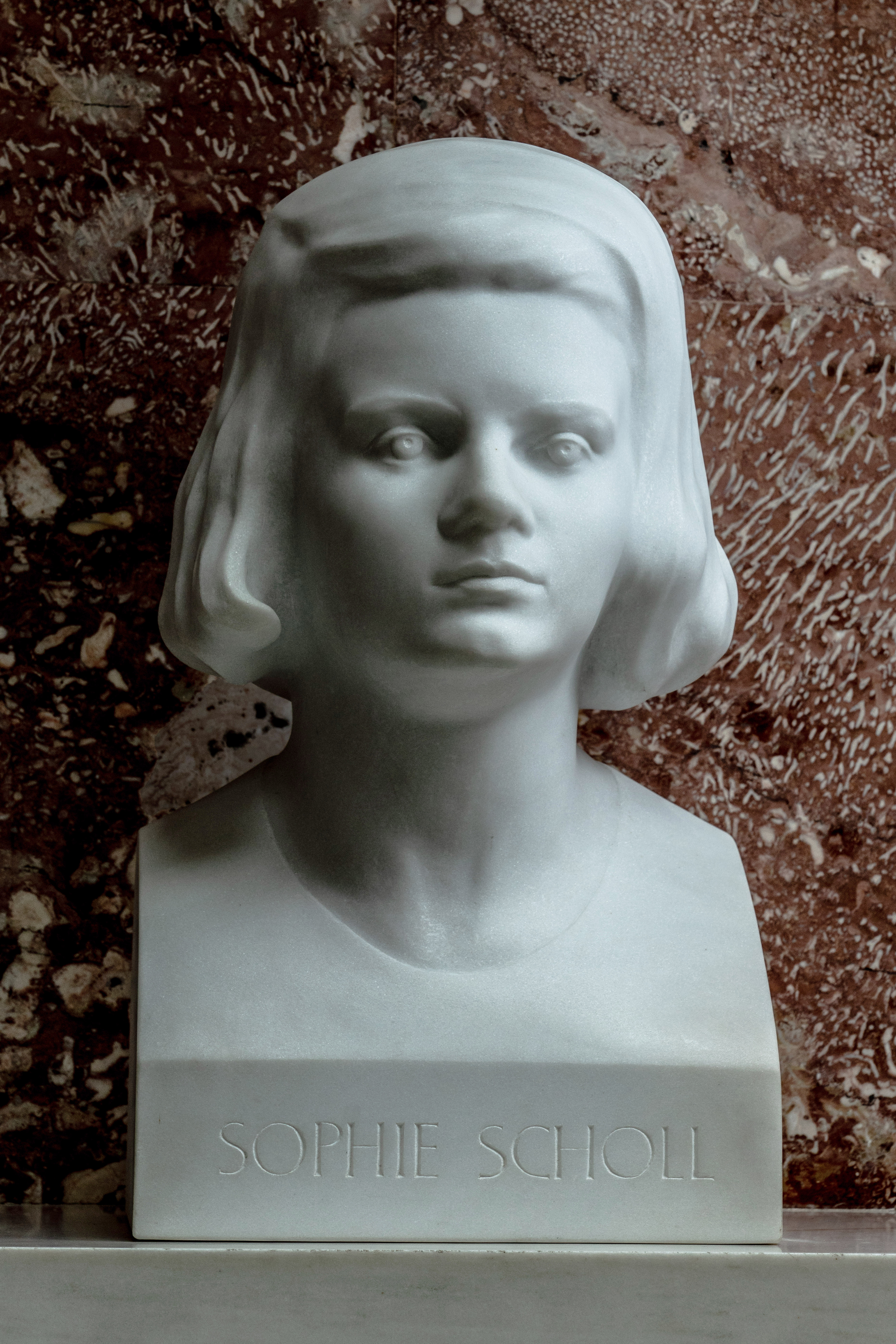
Bust of Sophie Scholl

On 22 February 2003, a bust of Scholl was placed by the government of Bavaria in the Walhalla temple. She was the fifth (Note: After: Maria Theresa (1811/1812), Countess Amalie Elisabeth of Hanau-Münzenberg (1817), Catherine the Great (1821), Karolina Gerhardinger (1998); before: Edith Stein (2009), Käthe Kollwitz (2019). See full list.) woman to receive that honor.

The Geschwister Scholl Institute of Political Science at LMU Munich is named in honour of Sophie and Hans Scholl. The Institute is home to the university's political science and communication departments, and is housed in the former Radio Free Europe building close to the Englischer Garten.

Many schools as well as countless streets and squares in Germany and Austria have been named after Scholl and her brother.

In 2003, Germans were invited by television broadcaster ZDF to participate in Unsere Besten (Our Best), a nationwide competition to choose the top ten most important Germans of all time. Voters under the age of 40 helped Scholl and her brother Hans to place fourth, above Bach, Goethe, Gutenberg, Bismarck, Willy Brandt, and Albert Einstein. If the votes of young viewers alone had been counted, Sophie and Hans Scholl would have been ranked first. Several years earlier, readers of Brigitte, a German women's magazine, voted Scholl "the greatest woman of the twentieth century".

In January 2014, the guillotine used to execute Sophie and Hans Scholl and other members of the White Rose Group was identified as being in storage in the Bavarian National Museum in Munich. The guillotine was considered lost for decades, but there are several indications that it was the instrument used to behead the Scholls, including modifications that were the hallmark of Johann Reichhart, the executioner.

On 9 May 2014, Google depicted Scholl for its Google Doodle on the occasion of what would have been her 93rd birthday.

In April 2021, the German Ministry of Finance issued a commemorative sterling silver €20 coin celebrating the 100th anniversary of Scholl's May birth and a commemorative stamp in May.

=== Cultural legacy ===
==== Film and television ====
In the 1970s and 1980s, there were three film accounts of Sophie Scholl and the White Rose resistance. The first TV film Der Pedell (1971) focused on the university maintenance man Jakob Schmid, who denounced Scholl and the other White Rose members. The TV film was produced for the West German ZDF. Percy Adlon's Fünf letzte Tage (Five Last Days, 1982) presented Lena Stolze as Scholl in her last days from the point of view of her cellmate Else Gebel. Stolze repeated the role in Michael Verhoeven's Die Weiße Rose (The White Rose, 1982). In an interview, Stolze said that playing the role was "an honour".

In February 2005, a film about Scholl's last days, Sophie Scholl – Die letzten Tage (Sophie Scholl – The Final Days), featuring Julia Jentsch in the title role, was released. Drawing on interviews with survivors and transcripts that had remained hidden in East German archives until 1990, it was nominated for an Academy Award for Best Foreign Language Film in January 2006. For her portrayal of Scholl, Jentsch won the best actress at the European Film Awards, best actress at the German Film Awards (Lolas), along with the Silver Bear for best actress at the Berlin Film Festival.

The German TV docudrama Frauen die Geschichte machten – Sophie Scholl was broadcast in 2013. Sophie Scholl was played by Liv Lisa Fries.

She was portrayed by Victoria Chilap in the documentary movie Death of a Nation in 2018.

==== In literature ====
In February 2009, The History Press published Sophie Scholl: The Real Story of the Woman who Defied Hitler by Frank McDonough.

In February 2010, Carl Hanser Verlag released Sophie Scholl: A Biography (in German), by Barbara Beuys.

In Libba Bray's 2025 novel Under the Same Stars, "Sophie Scholl" is the name of Jenny and Lena's queer punk rock band in the 1980s West Berlin storyline. The story behind the real-life Sophie Scholl is later conveyed.

==== In theatre ====
American playwright Lillian Garrett-Groag's play The White Rose features Scholl as a major character.

We Will Not Be Silent, a dramatization by David Meyers of Scholl's imprisonment and interrogation, premiered at the Contemporary American Theater Festival in Shepherdstown, West Virginia in July 2017.

Later in life, Whitney Seymour, his wife Catryna, and their daughters Tryntje and Gabriel, co-wrote and produced Stars in the Dark Sky, a one-act play about Hans and Sophie Scholl and their role in the White Rose resistance group in Nazi Germany in the 1940s. The play, which took around five years to write, was released in 2008 (when Seymour was 85) and it was performed off Broadway five times.

==== In music ====
George Donaldson, a Scottish folk singer wrote a song called "The White Rose" on an album titled the same, about Sophie and the White Rose movement.

The English punk band Zatopeks released an eponymous love song for Sophie Scholl on their debut album (2005).

Mickey 3D, a French rock band, wrote a song called "La Rose Blanche" on an album titled Sebolavy (2016).

American rock band Sheer Mag recorded a song called "(Say Goodbye to) Sophie Scholl" on its 2017 debut album Need to Feel Your Love.

Reg Meuross, a British folk singer, released "For Sophie" on his album Faraway People in 2017.

The title track from singer/songwriter James Maddock's 2020 album, No Time To Cry, is about Sophie and her involvement in the White Rose movement.

==== Social media ====
Under the title @ichbinsophiescholl the German broadcasters Südwestrundfunk and Bayerische Rundfunk launched an Instagram project to commemorate Scholl's 100th birthday in May 2021. The last months of Scholl's life are featured on Instagram posts and stories which are styled as if Scholl herself was posting them. Swiss actress Luna Wedler plays Sophie Scholl and she illustrates the last year of her life in the style of a modern digital influencer.

The project was criticized for blurring the distinction between historical fact and fiction, with some viewers struggling to differentiate the dramatized Scholl from the real historical figure. Critics noted that the portrayal encouraged an emotionalized response, leading followers to defend the fictionalized Scholl as a heroine when the project was questioned. More specific criticism from historians included arguments that the series altered historical events for dramatic effect and placed greater emphasis on storytelling than on conveying Scholl's core ideals and historical context. Some commenters on the project identified closely with the dramatized Scholl and engaged with the story as if it were unfolding in real-time. Reviewers of the project noted that many users shared sentimental stories about their grandparents in the comment section, often portraying them as victims rather than discussing their roles within Nazi Germany. Critics argued that these interactions reinforced a "German victimhood" narrative, particularly as discussions of Nazi crimes were less emphasized in the project. Céline Wendelgaß of Bildungsstätte Anne Frank noted that the project lacked an educational framework and nourished problematic narratives, such as the belief that there was a lot of resistance in Germany, and that German soldiers were exclusively portrayed as traumatized persons without any mention of the war crimes which they committed.

== See also ==
- Geschwister-Scholl-Preis
- Helmuth Hübener
- Otto and Elise Hampel
- Swing Kids
- List of peace activists
