= Helene Nonné-Schmidt =

German textile artist (1891–1976)

- Born: 8 November 1891
- Died: 7 April 1976 (aged 84)
- Alma mater: Bauhaus
- Occupation: Artist, university teacher, textile artist
- Employer: Ulm School of Design
- Spouse(s): Joost Schmidt

Helene Nonné-Schmidt (born as Helene Frieda Nonne, 8 November 1891 in Buckau (Magdeburg); died 7 April 1976 in Darmstadt) was a German professor for art at the Ulm School of Design and a textile artist at the Bauhaus.

== Biography ==
Helene Nonné was born on 8 November 1891, in the Buckau district of Magdeburg, as the daughter of the engineer Franz Nonne and his wife Leokadya Koterwas. She attended the Magdeburg School of Arts and Crafts and from 1913 to 1916 the Royal School of Art in Berlin, where she obtained a qualification as an art teacher, specifically for teaching drawing. During the First World War, she worked as a caregiver for children. After the war, she continued her studies and obtained a qualification as a crafts teacher in 1919. She then worked as a crafts and art teacher at the Viktoria-Lyceum in Berlin and the Women's School in Magdeburg. She visited the Bauhaus exhibition in Weimar in 1923 and decided to further her studies there. Due to her previous education, she was exempted from the Bauhaus preliminary course and started directly in the weaving workshop at the Bauhaus in 1924.

Nonné-Schmidt studied under Paul Klee, delved into questions of art theory, and obtained her Bauhaus diploma from Klee and Gunta Stölzl in 1930. Since 1925, she was married to Joost Schmidt (1893–1948), a typographer and painter who taught at the Bauhaus and was the head of the sculpture workshop, the advertising department, and the printing press. Both moved with the Bauhaus to Dessau, where Schmidt began his work as a master at the Bauhaus and she worked as an art pedagogue until 1933. Until that year, they lived on Burgkühnauer Allee in one of the Master's Houses and then moved to Berlin, where Joost Schmidt taught at the Reimann School.

During the time of Nazism, Joost Schmidt received a work ban after being denounced. Nonné-Schmidt created some occasional arts and crafts works during this period. Her studio was destroyed during the bombing raids. After the liberation, Joost Schmidt organized a Bauhaus exhibition in West Berlin, but he died in 1948 while preparing for another exhibition in Nuremberg.

In 1949, Nonné-Schmidt briefly worked for the magazine 'Illustrierte Heute' in Munich and then moved to Wangen in the Allgäu region. In 1953, Max Bill invited Nonné, as everyone called her, to the newly founded Ulm School of Design, where she conducted the preliminary course in the first years alongside former Bauhaus members Josef Albers, Walter Peterhans, and Johannes Itten. Among her students were artists such as Mary Bauermeister and designers Immo Krumrey and Martin Krampen. She concluded her teaching at Ulm in 1956. In 1961, she moved to Darmstadt, where the first location of the Bauhaus Archive was, and prepared her book about Joost Schmidt, which was posthumously published in 1984

Helene Nonné-Schmidt lived to be 84 years old. She died on 7 April 1976, in Darmstadt.

== Writings (selection) ==
- The area of women at the Bauhaus. 1926. In: Hans Maria Wingler: The Bauhaus 1919–1933. Weimar, Dessau, Berlin, and the Succession in Chicago since 1937. Cologne, 1962, 3rd edition 1975, p. 126.
- Joost Schmidt: Teaching and work at the Bauhaus 1919-32. With contributions by Heinz Loew and Helene Nonne-Schmidt. Düsseldorf: Edition Marzona, 1984.
- Paul Klee: Pedagogical Sketchbook. New edition with an afterword by Helene Schmidt-Nonne. Berlin: Gebr. Mann, 2003.

== Literature ==
- Sigrid Wortmann Weltge: Bauhaus Textiles: Art and Female Artists of the Weaving Workshop. Schaffhausen: Ed. Stemmle, 1993, p. 205
- Eckhard Neumann (Ed.): Bauhaus and Bauhäusler: Memories and Confessions. Expanded new edition 1985, Cologne: DuMont, 1996, S. 185–193
- Martin Krampen, Günther Hörmann: The Ulm School of Design / Die Hochschule für Gestaltung Ulm. Beginnings of a Project of Radical Modernism / Anfänge eines Projektes der radikalen Moderne. Berlin: Ernst und Sohn, 2003
