= Moses Bahelfer =

Polish artist and graphic designer

- Born: Moshe Bagelferyches; 29 June 1908; Vilnius, Russian Empire (now Vilnius, Lithuania)
- Died: 1995 (aged 87); Paris, France
- Other names: Moses Bagel
- Spouse: Gitel Golde
- Children: Amos Bagel-Feryches

Moses Bahelfer (1908-1995) a Polish-born was a Jewish artist and graphic designer associated with the Bauhaus.

== Early life and education ==
=== Early life ===
Moshe Bagelferyches was born on 29 June 1908 in Vilnius, a part of the Russian Empire (now Lithuania). He took up painting from at an early age, later going on to work as an apprentice at a local vocational school while taking classes at the Vilnius Academy of Arts. Bagelferyches also joined Yungvilno, a group formed by young Jewish artists in the city, who hosted exhibitions.

=== Bauhaus ===
Bagelferyches matriculated at the Bauhaus Dessau in 1928, after which he went by the name Moses Bahelfer. Because Bahelfer did not have the means to fully pay for his education at the school, he was provided with free meals and partial exemption from tuition fees.

At the school, Bahelfer studied under Joost Schmidt, Paul Klee, Lyonel Feininger, and Wassily Kandinsky.

In 1932, Bahelfer married, Gitel Golde, a classmate at the Bauhaus. He graduated the same year and moved to Paris with his wife shortly thereafter.

== Career in France ==
In Paris, Bahelfer (there known there by the surname Bagel) worked as a graphic designer, children's book illustrator, and photographer. Following the outbreak of World War II in 1939, he joined the French Foreign Legion.

During the German occupation of France, Bahelfer lived in Toulouse, where he aided the Resistance by forging identification documents.

After the end of World War II, Bahelfer returned to France, working in set design and as an illustrator for various Yiddish publications. From 1947 to 1968, he worked in the design department at 20th Century Fox.

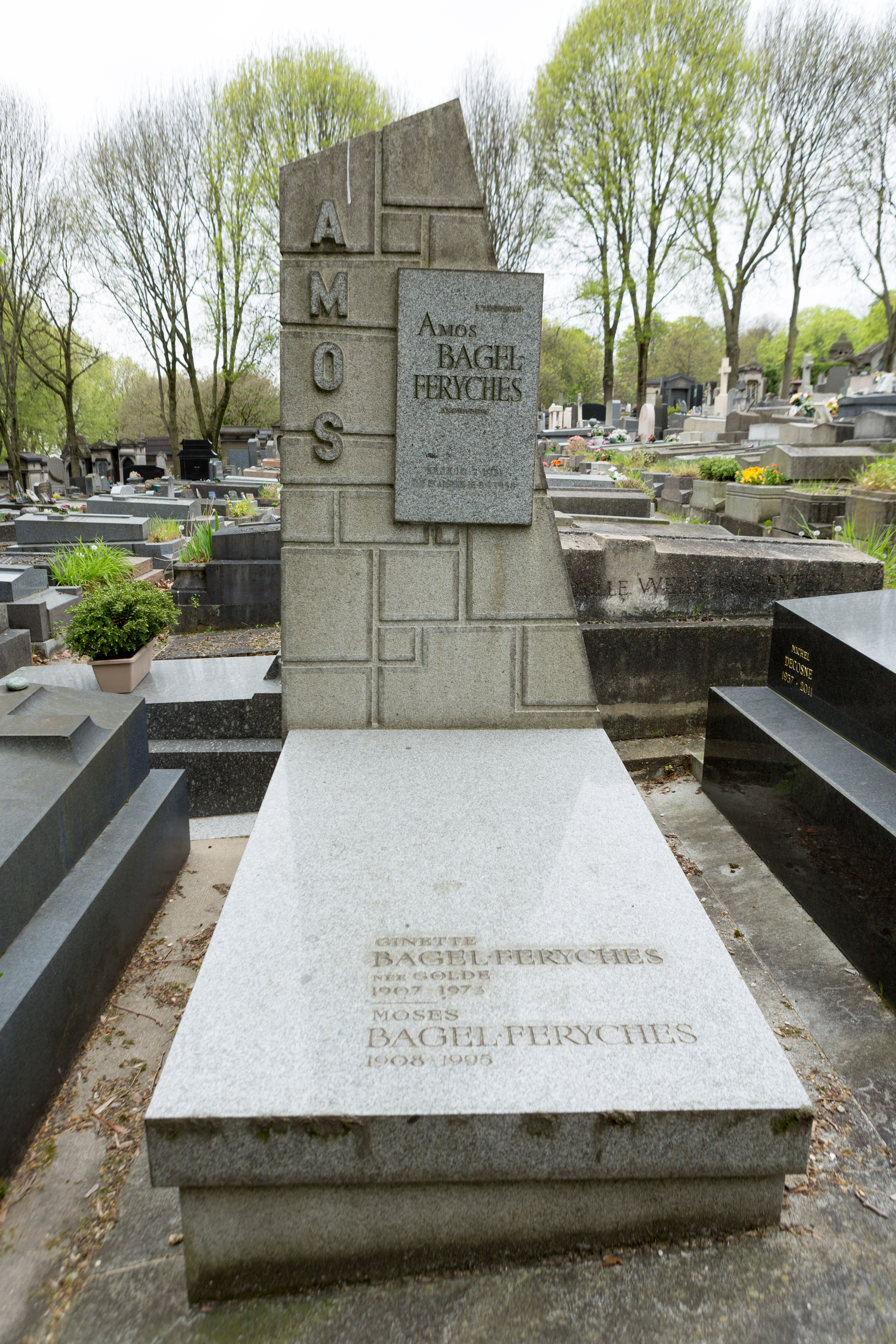
Grave of Bahelfer at the Père Lachaise Cemetery

In 1959 UNESCO commissioned Bahelfer to produce a series of paintings commemorating Sholem Aleichem. The paintings are now owned by the Sholem Aleichem Foundation in Tel Aviv, Israel.

Bahelfer died in 1995 in Paris.
