= Hans G. Conrad =

Swiss photographer and designer (1926–2003)

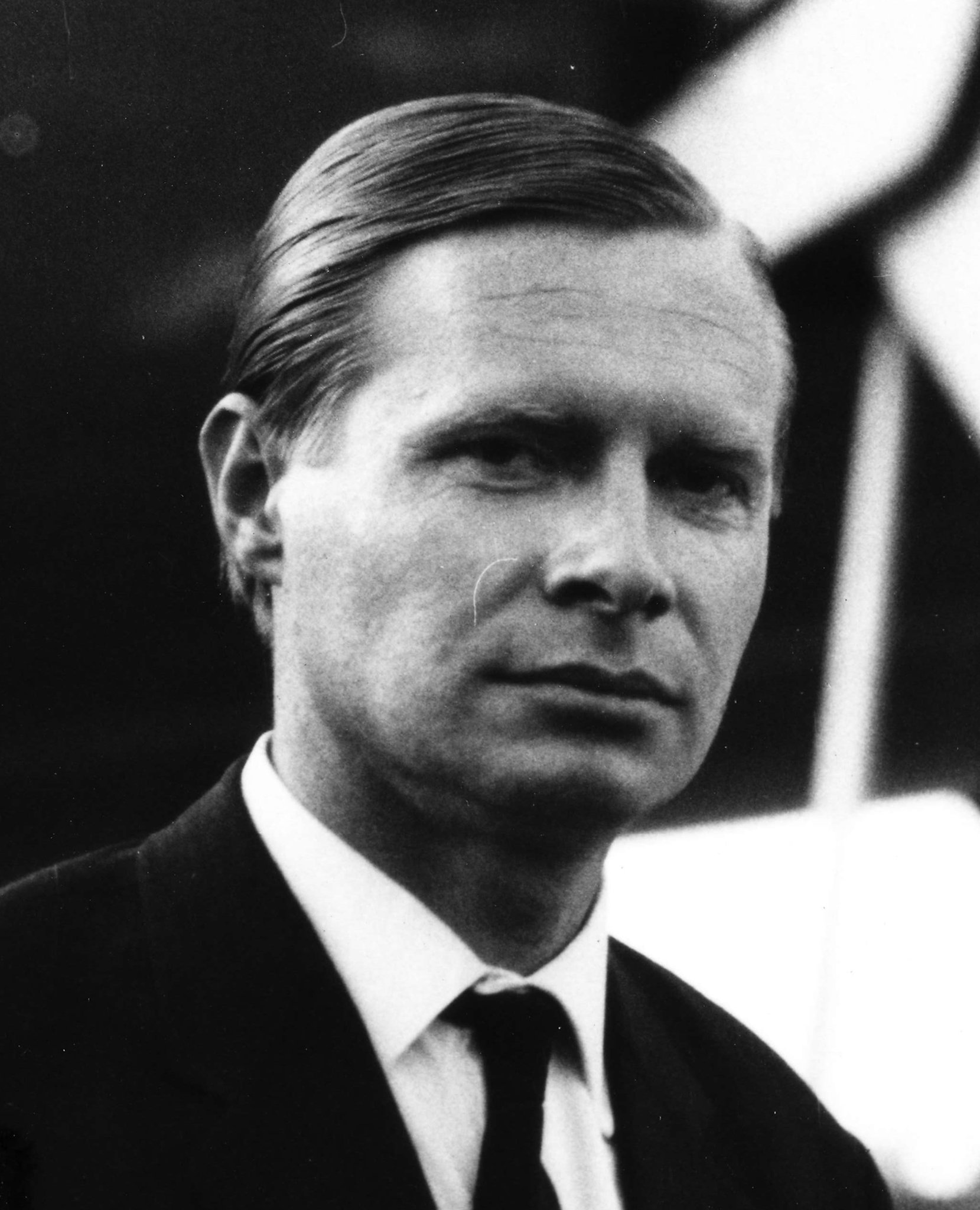
- Conrad in 1964
- Born: Johann Gerold Konrad; Remetschwil
- Died: Cologne
- Occupations: Photographer, designer

Hans G. Conrad (*11 June 1926 in Remetschwil, Switzerland as Johann Gerold Konrad; † 26 December 2003 in Cologne, Germany) was a photographer and graphic designer in the 20th century.

== Life and works ==
Hans G. Conrad grew up in modest circumstances and graduated from the so-called Werkschule of Brown, Boveri & Cie. in Baden, Switzerland. In the late 1940s he met the artist, architect, designer and publicist Max Bill in Zurich, Switzerland. Conrad worked for Bill, who, at that time, had been commissioned to design the Swiss Pavilion for the Milan Triennial IX in 1951. At that time, Conrad was also working for the Swiss architect and designer Alfred Roth (not to be confused with the German politician). Later, between 1952 and 1954, Conrad designed promotional advertising for the German-American furniture manufacturer Knoll International belonging to Florence Knoll and Hans Knoll.

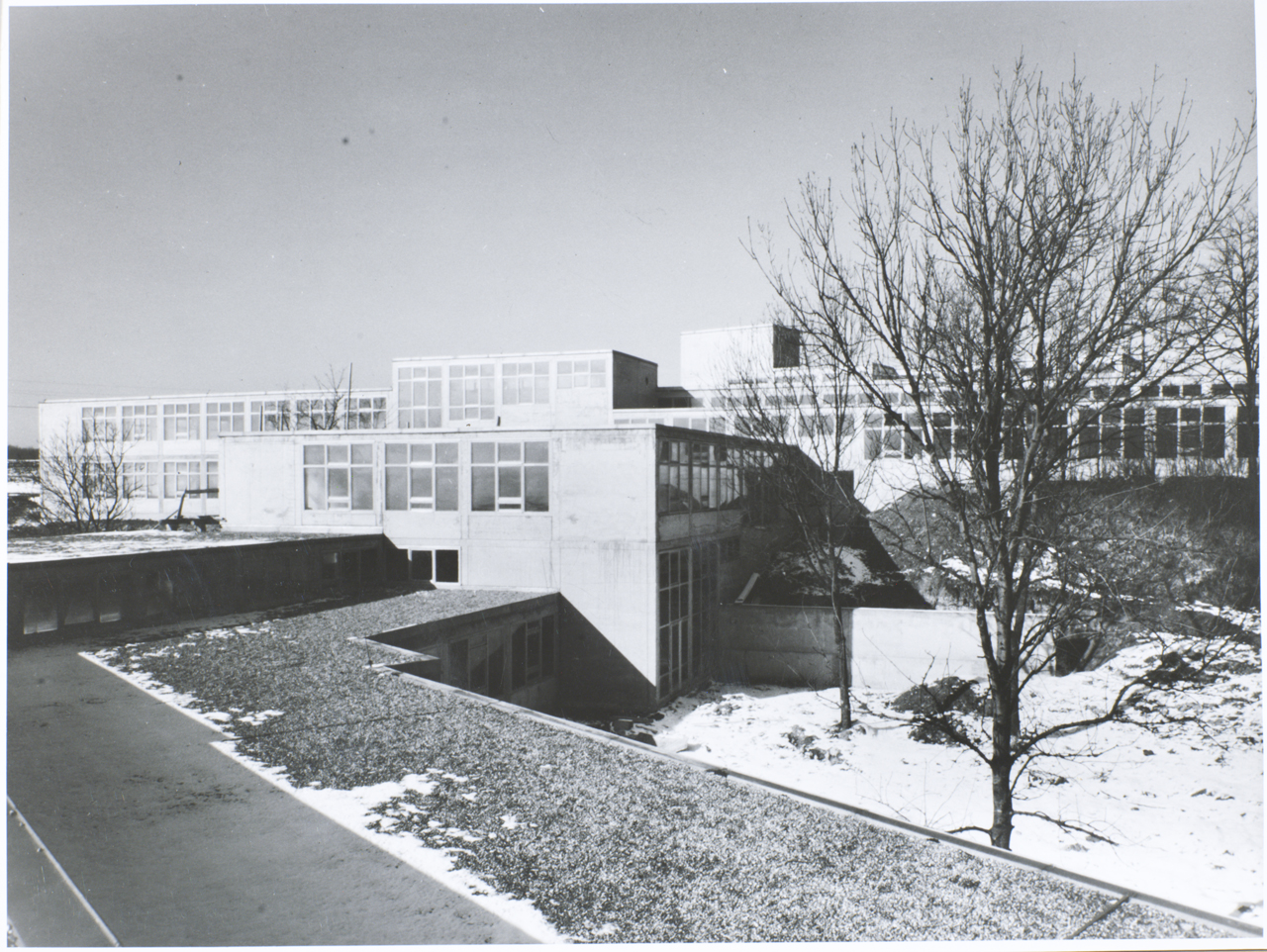
Hans G. Conrad (photo): Ulm School of Design (Hochschule für Gestaltung, HfG), Germany, 1955. Architect: Max Bill

By way of Max Bill, who was one of the co-founders of the Ulm School of Design (Hochschule für Gestaltung, HfG) alongside Otl Aicher and Inge Scholl, Conrad relocated to Ulm during the HfG's founding period, most likely on 1 December 1952. He was the first student at the HfG: his student ID was valid from 1 January 1953, although classes did not officially start until 3 August 1953.

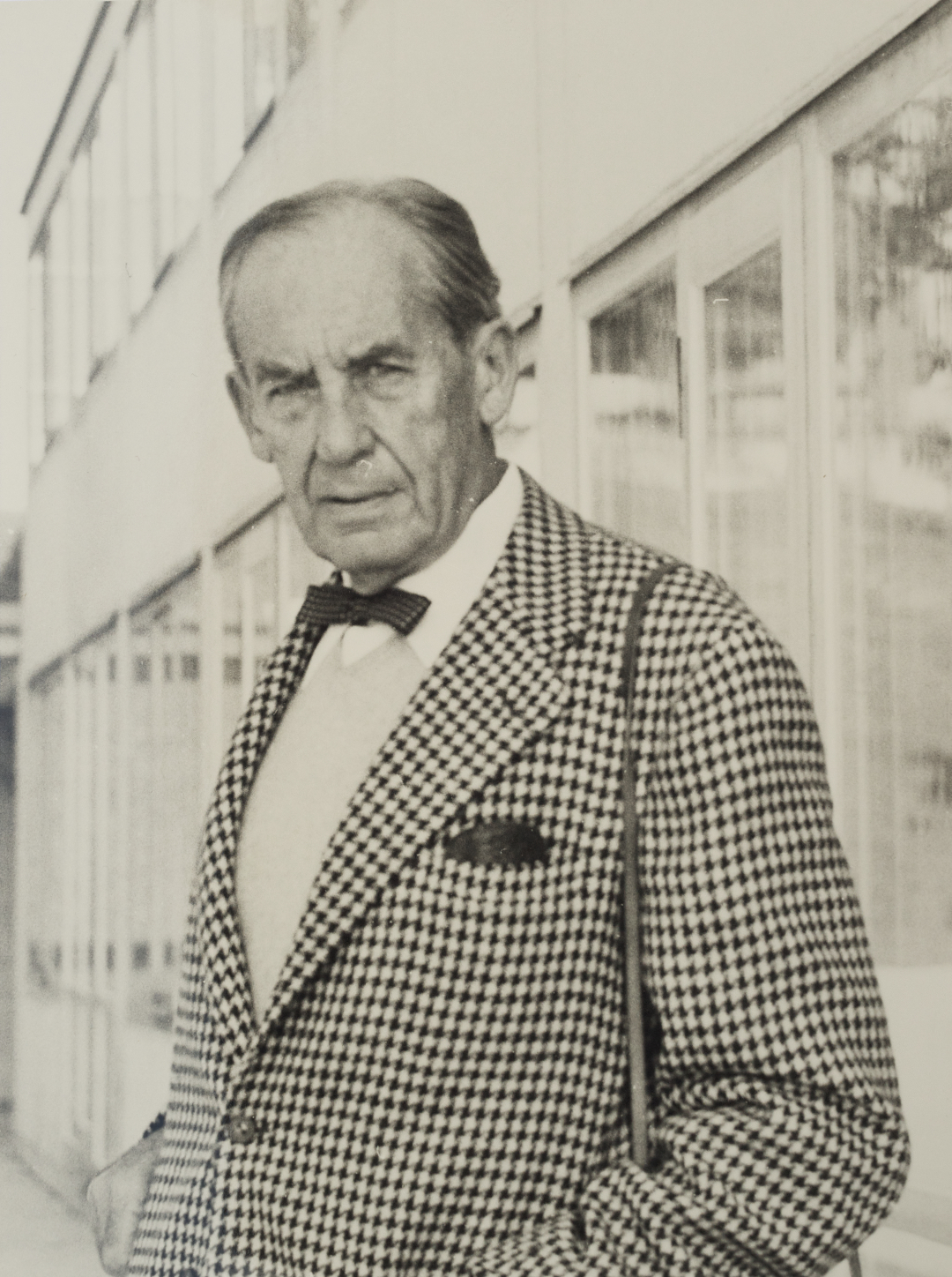
Hans G. Conrad (photo): Walter Gropius at the terrace of the Ulm School of Design during the building opening ceremonies, 1 October 1955

At first he studied product design and then visual communication. Conrad met his first wife, Eva-Maria Koch, who was also a student at the HfG, in Ulm. Otl Aicher and Conrad developed an exhibition system for the electrical appliance manufacturer Max Braun (company) that was used for the first time at the Deutsche Rundfunk- Phono- und Fernsehen Ausstellung (German Broadcasting, Phonograph and Television Exhibition) in Düsseldorf in 1955. In 1956, the combined phonograph-radio device Phonosuper Braun SK 4, later known as the Schneewittchensarg (Snow White's Casket), which is one of the most influential design developments of the 20th century (design: Hans Gugelot, Dieter Rams and Otl Aicher), was introduced in this design setting. He designed an exhibition bus for Braun as a final project, which was, however, never realized.

Conrad worked as the head of trade fair and exhibition design at Braun from 1958 until 1962. Thereafter, he took over as head of worldwide advertising for Lufthansa. He engaged Otl Aicher and his design group E5 of the HfG in Ulm to develop a visual corporate design concept for Lufthansa. Otl Aicher's concept from 1962 is seen today as a milestone for the development of rationally derived corporate design concepts and is, in its most substantial and essential elements, still used today.

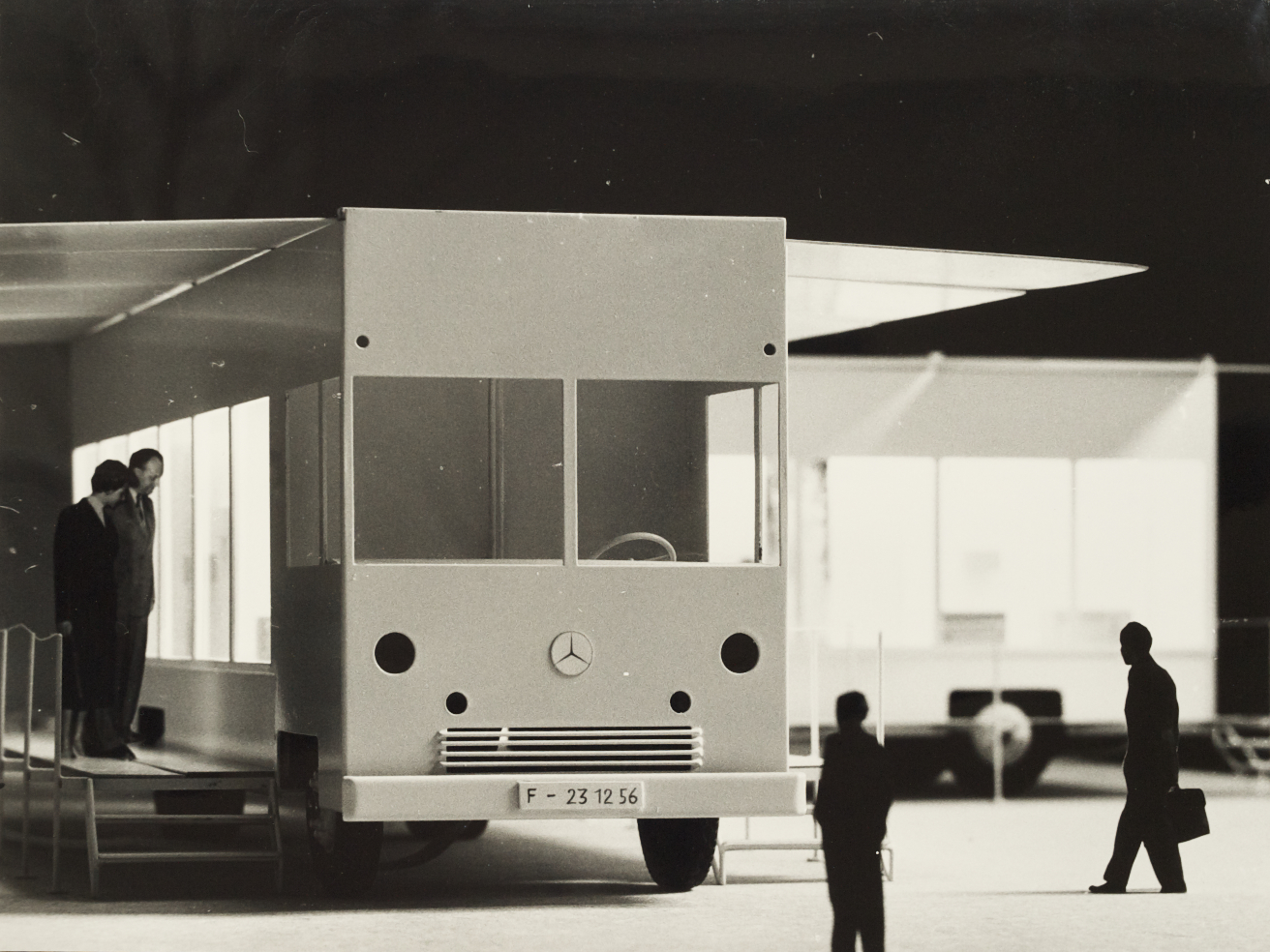
Hans G. Conrad (design and photo): Exhibition bus for Braun, 1957

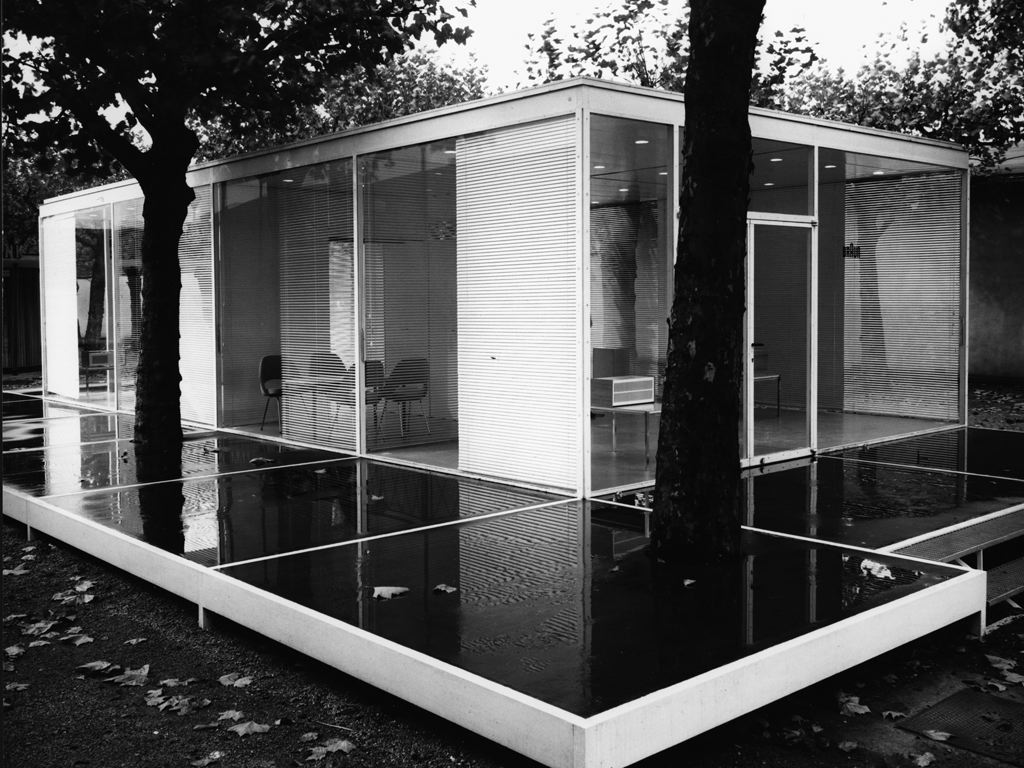
Hans G. Conrad (photo): Free standing pavilion of the electrical appliance manufacturer Braun on the site of the Trade Fair Frankfurt am Main, 1959

Hans G. Conrad was a member of the committee for visual design of the Olympic Games in Munich between 1969 and 1972. (Chairman: Anton Stankowski). Otl Aicher led the department XI (visual design).

Conrad became a member of the editorial staff of the business magazine "Capital" in 1970 (position comparable to today's Creative Director). Adolf Theobald was the publisher of the magazine and Ferdinand Simoneit its editor in chief until 1974 at which time Johannes Gross took over the position. The magazine developed into one of the most influential and predominant in Germany's media under his leadership.

In 1989 Conrad left "Capital". In October 1992 he suffered a stroke. He died on 26 December 2003 in a nursing home in Cologne-Rodenkirchen.
