= Ulm School of Design =

Former design school in Ulm, Germany

Coordinates: 48°22′50″N 9°57′10″E

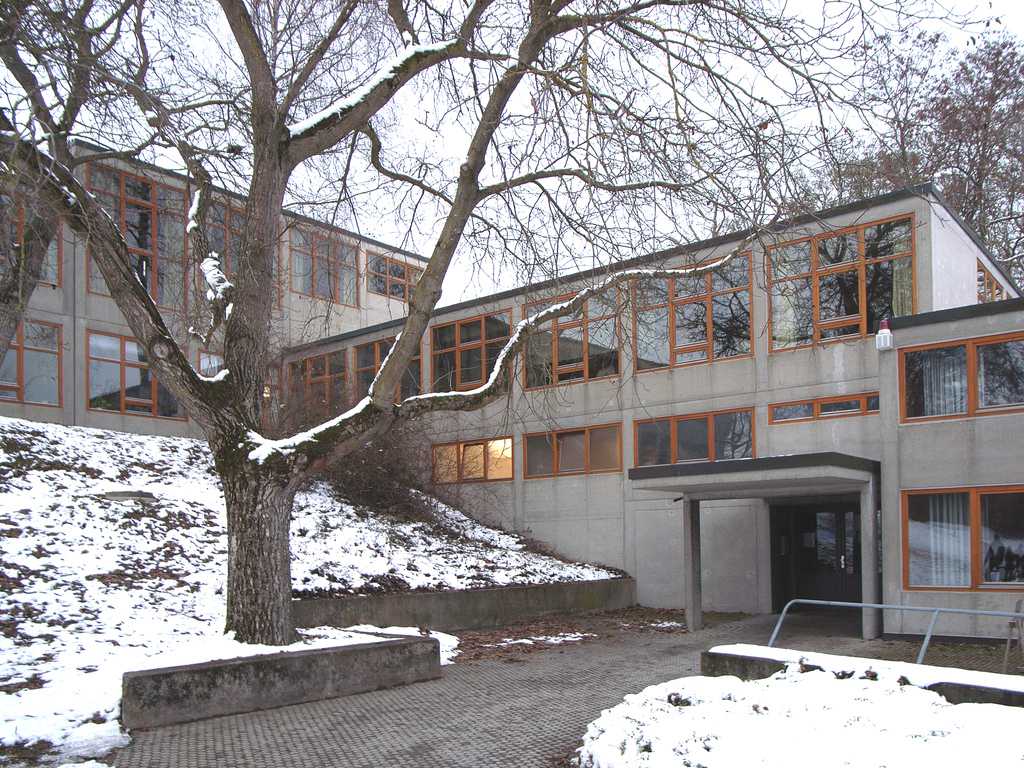
Building Ulm HfG designed by Max Bill and completed in 1955.

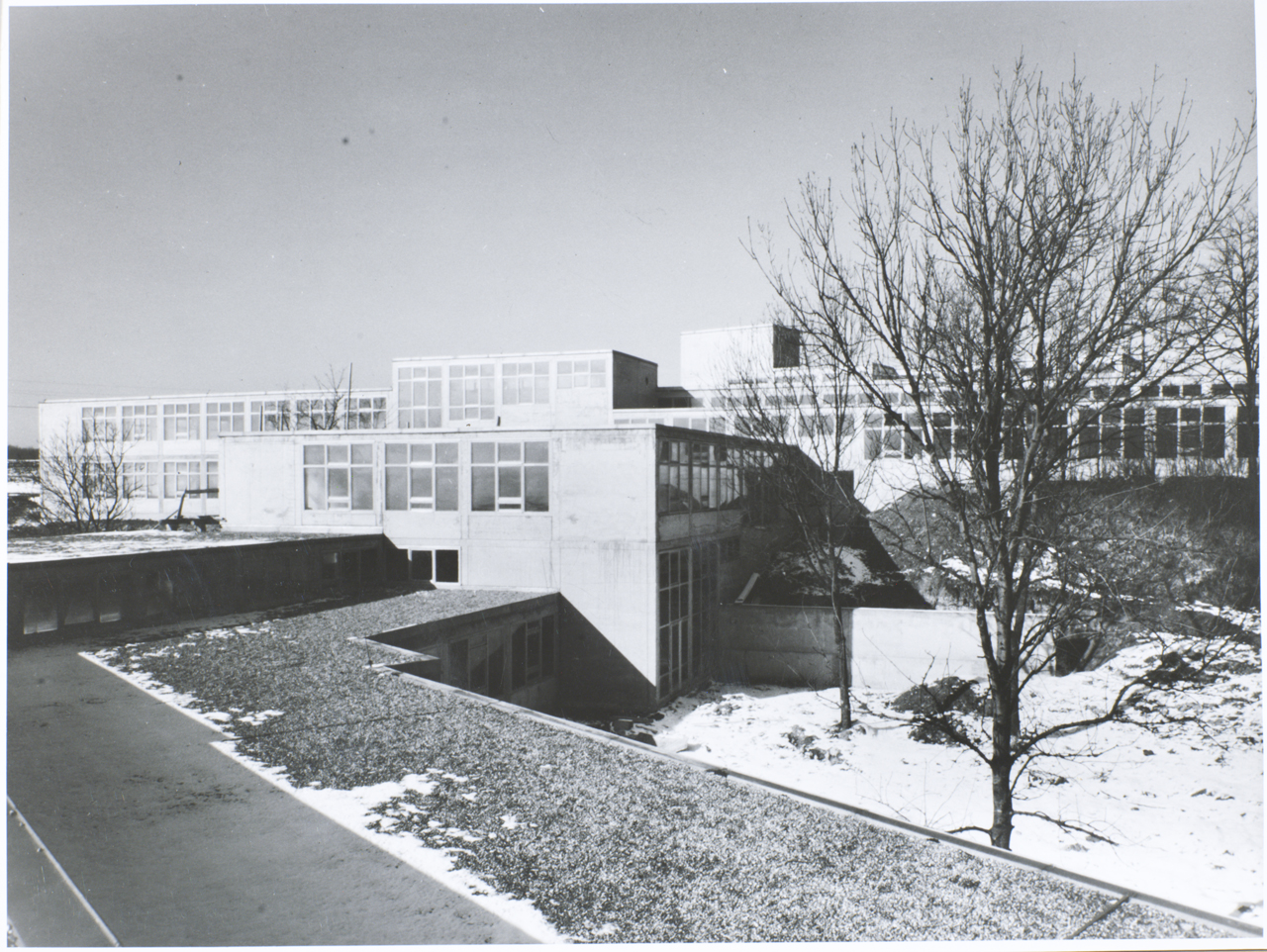
Building Ulm HfG, photography by Hans G. Conrad.

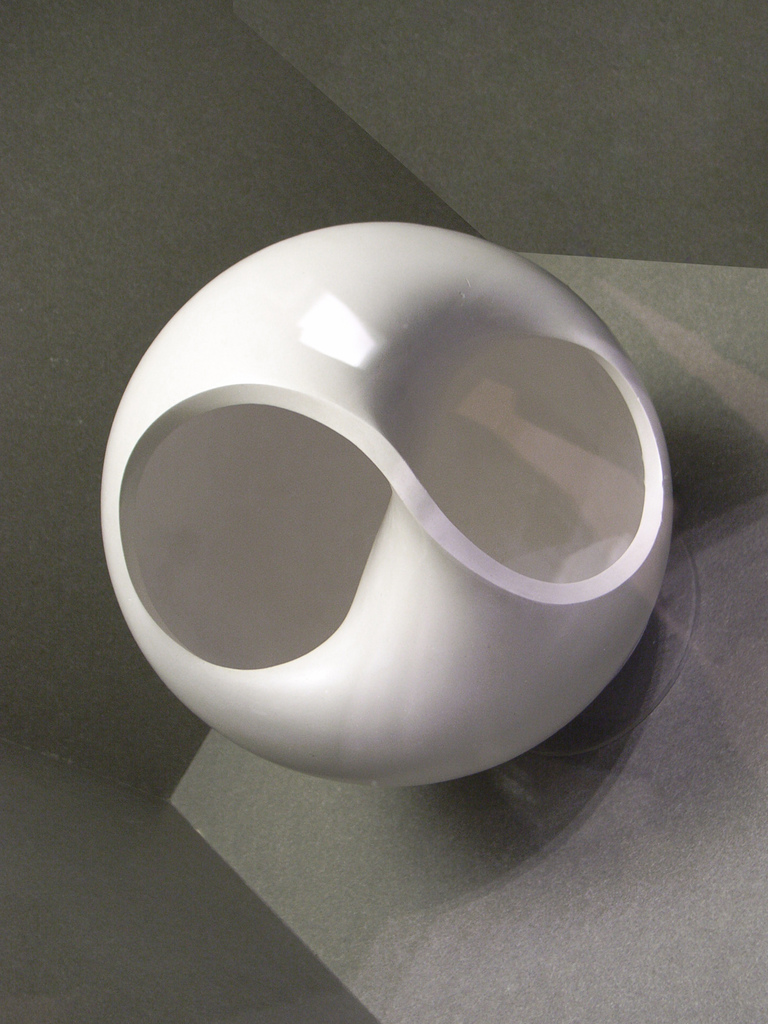
Model for the continuous study of the workshop of Tomas Maldonado.

The Ulm School of Design (German: Hochschule für Gestaltung Ulm) was a college of design located in Ulm, Germany. It was founded in 1953 by Inge Aicher-Scholl, Otl Aicher and Max Bill, the latter being first rector of the school and a former student at the Bauhaus. The HfG quickly gained international recognition by emphasizing the holistic, multidisciplinary context of design beyond the Bauhaus approach of integrating art, craft and technology. The subjects of sociology, psychology, politics, economics, philosophy and systems-thinking were integrated with aesthetics and technology. During HfG operations from 1953–1968, progressive approaches to the design process were implemented within the departments of Product Design, Visual Communication, Industrialized Building, Information and Filmmaking.

The HfG building was designed by Max Bill and remains intact today as a historically important and functional building under the auspices of Foundation Ulm. The HfG was the most progressive educational institution of design in the 1950s and 1960s and a pioneer in the study of semiotics. It is viewed as one of the world's significant design schools, equal in influence to the Bauhaus.

The history of HfG evolved through innovation and change, in line with their own self-image of the school as an experimental institution. This resulted in numerous changes in the content, organization of classes and continuing internal conflicts that influenced the final decision of closing the HfG in 1968. Although the school ceased operation after fifteen years, the ′Ulm Model′ continues to have a major influence on international design education.

== History ==
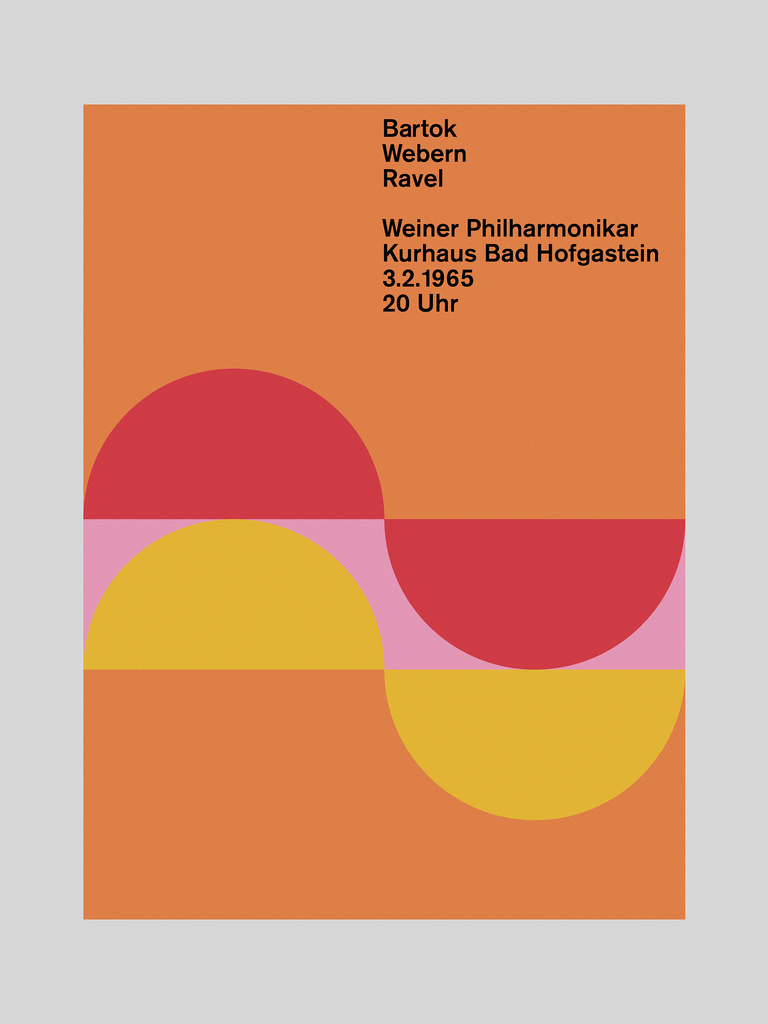
Poster designed by Margarete Kögler in the class of Otl Aicher.

=== Background and early political history ===
The postwar years, between 1945 and 1952 in West Germany were characterized by heavy restructuring and financing plans, such as the Marshall Plan.

The origins of HfG go back to an initiative by the brother-and-sister Scholl Foundation. The Scholl Foundation was created in 1950 by Inge Scholl in memory of their siblings Sophie and Hans Scholl, members of the resistance group "White Rose", executed in 1943 by the National Socialists (Nazis).

In 1946 Inge Scholl along with Otl Aicher and a group of young intellectuals considered creating a teaching and research institution to foster the humanistic education ideal and link creative activity to everyday life. They would seek this goal in context of the cultural reconstruction of German society morally destroyed by Nazism and World War II. The project was funded through the influx of a million marks by John McCloy of the American High Command for Germany in the post-war governing structure.

Through contacts with Max Bill and Walter Gropius, the Foundation also received financial support from the German Federal Financial Directorship and from the European Aid to Europe as well as private contributions and industry funding.

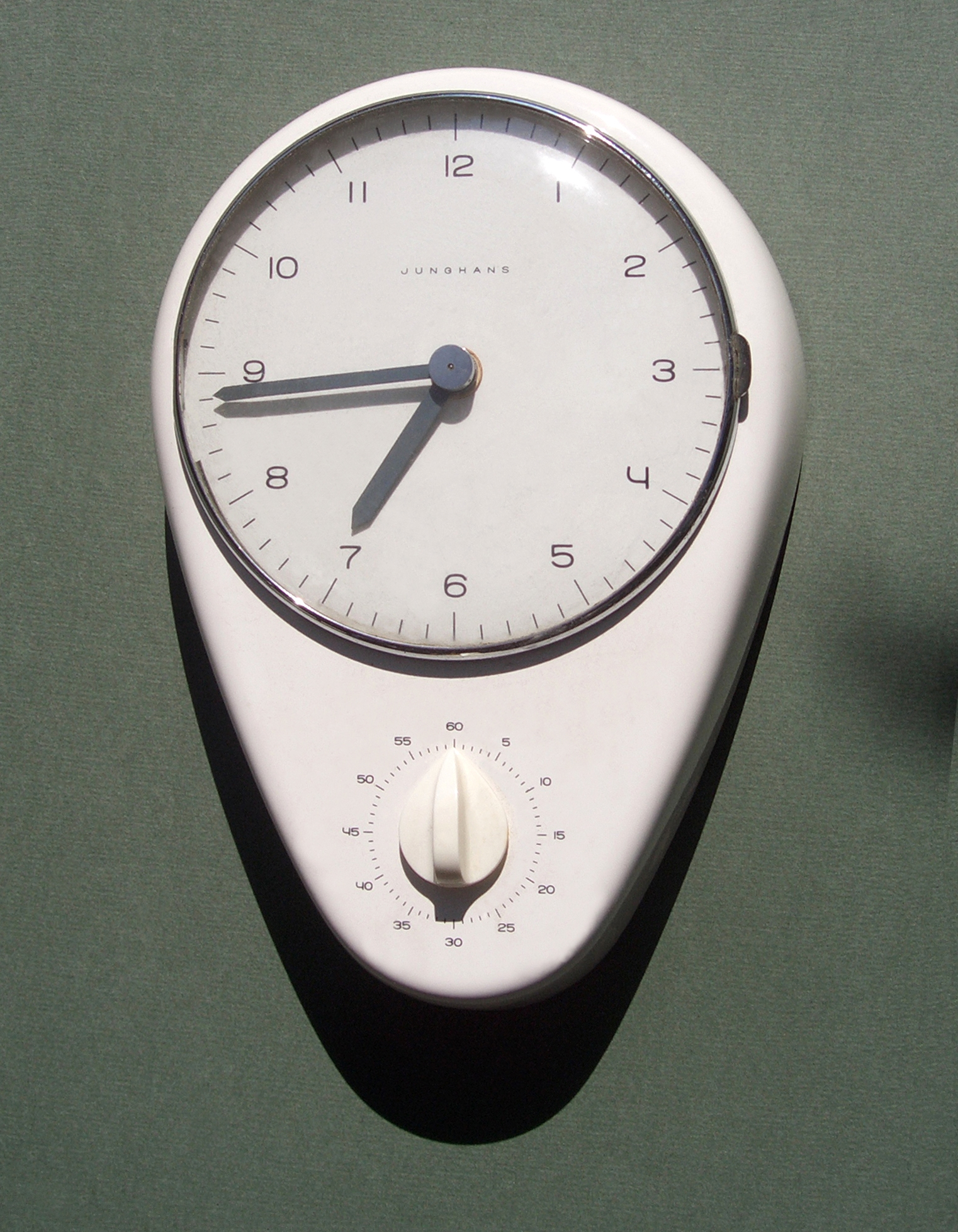
Clock designed by Max Bill for Junghans during his time at the HfG.

HfG began operating the new college in 1953 with Max Bill, a former student at the Bauhaus, as rector. On 3 August of that year, operations were begun in rooms at the Ulm ‘Volkshochschule’ (institution for adult education) with a faculty consisting of Josef Albers, Johannes Itten and Walter Peterhans (former Bauhaus instructors) and Helene Nonné-Schmidt (Bauhaus graduate). Later HfG faculty would include Hans Gugelot, Otl Aicher, Tomás Maldonado, Friedrich Vordemberge-Gildewart and Walter Zeischegg. Distinguished visiting lecturers were invited from a variety of disciplines and included: Mies van der Rohe, Walter Gropius, Charles and Ray Eames, Herbert Bayer, Josef Müller-Brockmann, Reyner Banham, Buckminster Fuller, Hugo Häring, Konrad Wachsmann, Norbert Wiener, Ralph Ellison, and Mia Seeger.

The teaching was based on a curriculum covering four years. The first academic year was devoted to the basic course and then students chose a specialty from Product Design, Visual Communication, Industrialized Building, Information (which lasted until 1962) and Filmmaking, which until 1961 belonged to the Visual Communications department since 1962 and became independent.

In 1953 the new building was started, designed by Max Bill, and the inauguration took place on October 2, 1955. The HfG building complex was one of the first in Germany built as reinforced concrete structures with spacious workshops, dormitories and a cafeteria. The interiors and furnishings were designed for flexible use and outdoor terraces were often used for lectures.

=== Internal conflicts ===
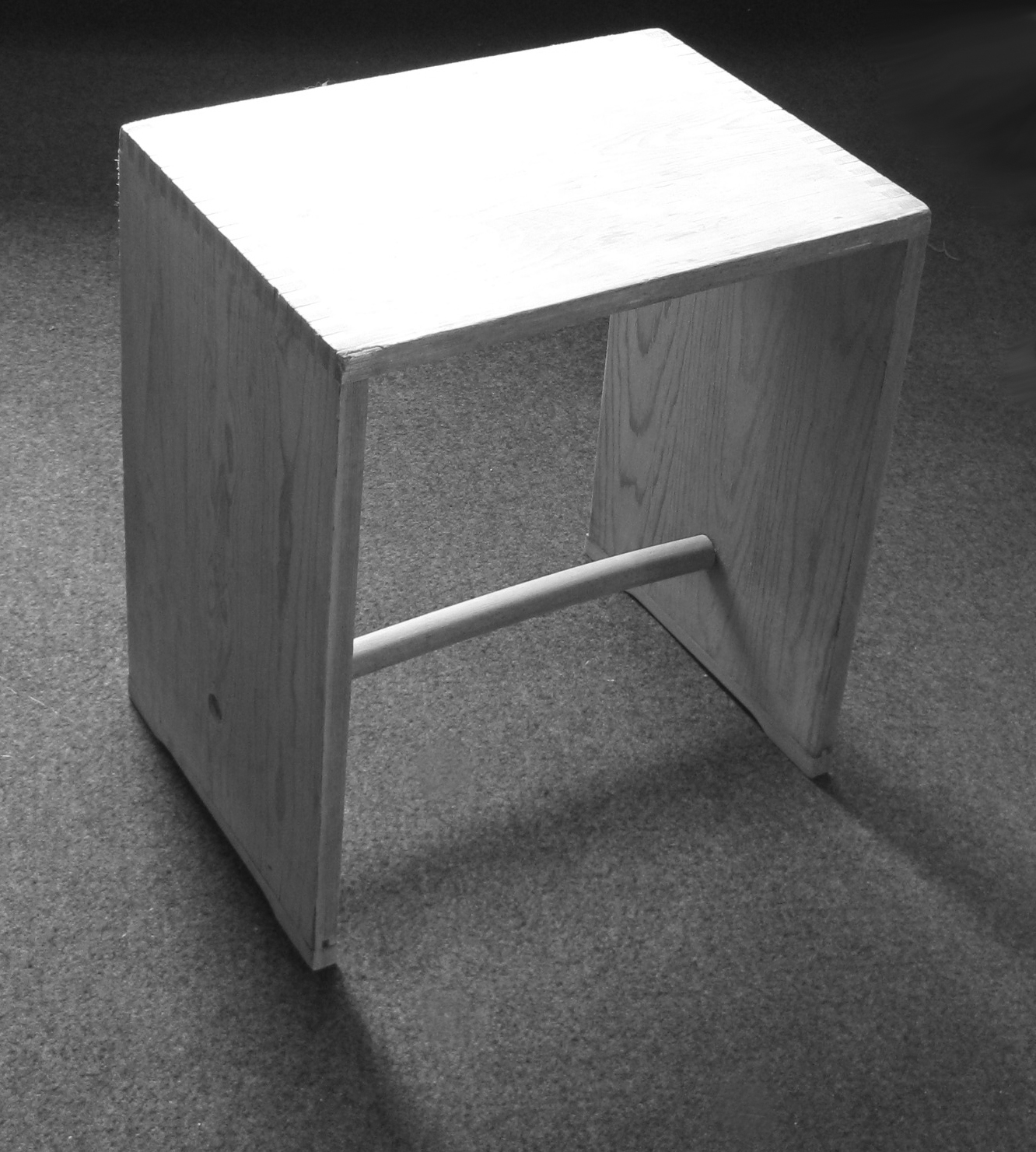
Bench designed by Max Bill and Hans Gugelot. This versatile functional design furniture was used for multiple purposes in the workshops of the HfG Ulm.

In 1956 Max Bill resigned as rector, due to changes in the body of academic development and differences in the approach to design school teaching. Tomás Maldonado took his place as rector. Bill continued to teach but finally left the school in 1957. Max Bill favored a teaching approach that followed the continuation of the "heroic" Bauhaus tradition, based on the Arts and Crafts model, in which the artist-designer saw their primary role in product development as form-giving. A key objective of the Bauhaus was also to ensure the form-giving artist-designer considered the technology of materials and mass production methods. However, many teachers at HfG, especially those of theoretical courses, sought to emphasize analytic methods encompassing sociological, economic, psychological and physiological considerations.

Among them was Tomás Maldonado, who saw the design process as a system embodying both scientific-based and intuitive-based thinking. Aesthetic considerations were no longer the primary conceptual basis of design. The professional designer would be an "integrator" with responsibility for integrating a large number of specialties in addition to aesthetics, mostly the diverse requirements of materials, manufacturing and context of product use, as well as considerations of usability, identity and marketing. Under the leadership of Maldonado, the school dropped the "artist" focus of Max Bill and proposed a new philosophy of education as an "operational science", a systems-thinking approach which embodied both art and science.

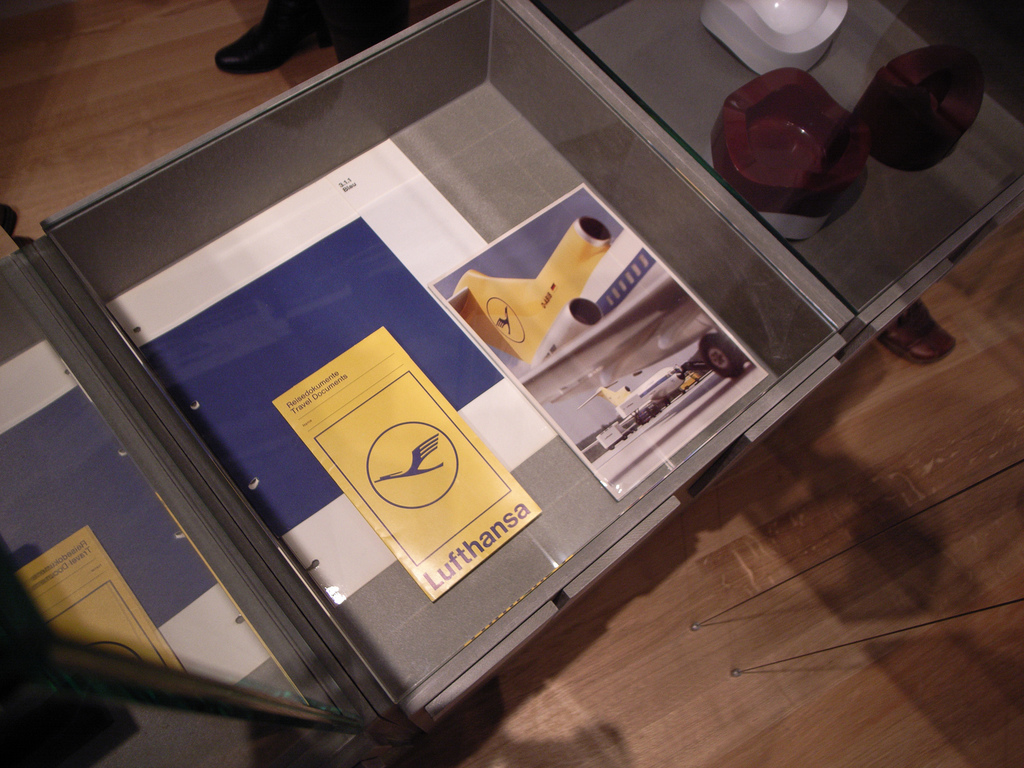
Corporate Identity Design for Lufthansa.

Max Bill's departure also heralded a new phase: the creation of "development groups" that were created specifically to create links with industry. Many of the resulting designs went into production immediately. Among the most successful was audio equipment for the company Braun, corporate identity for the German airline Lufthansa and elevated trains for Railroad Hamburg. These industrial commissions brought a wealth of experience in teaching and decisive influence to the school and enhanced its reputation.

In the fall of 1958 a major exhibition was held in the HfG five years after its opening. The HfG was presented to the general public for the first time, showing both the results of work from student workshops and the work of teachers. That same year also came the first issue of the HfG magazine "ulm", which was published in German and English, and lasted until the school closed in 1968.

The formal education process continued to evolve during the 1960s. Teachers such as the mathematician Horst Rittel, sociologist Hanno Kesting, and industrial designer Bruce Archer were in favor of a design methodology based primarily on analytical studies, including business analysis. This approach caused internal conflicts as Otl Aicher, Hans Gugelot, Walter Zeischegg, and Tomás Maldonado resisted such an overly analytical emphasis and claimed instead that the design process had to be more than strictly a 'method of analysis'. It must be a balancing of both art and science, such as with the study of semiotics.

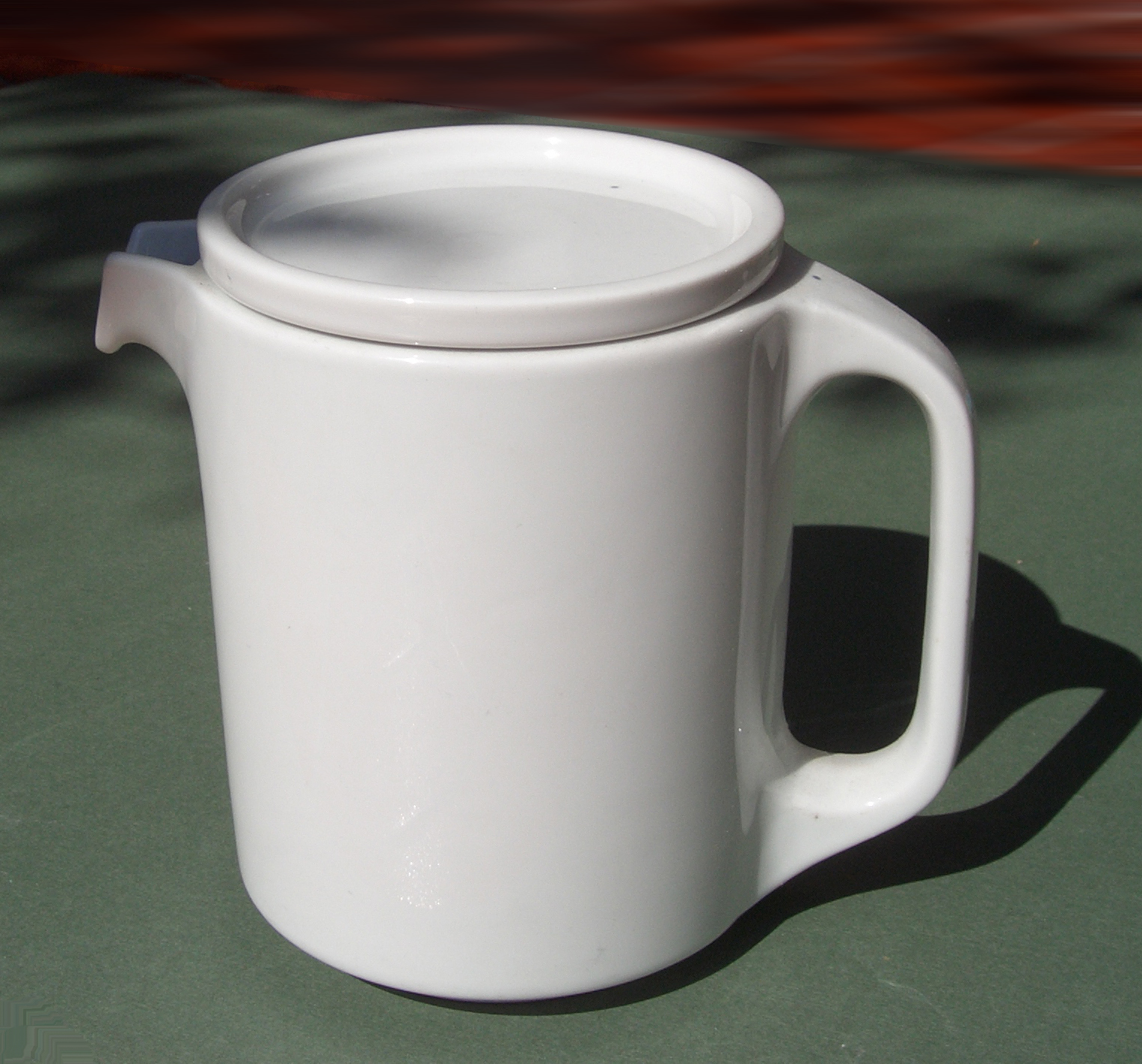
Cup as part of stackable tableware for hotels designed by Hans Roericht for thesis work during 1958 and 1959.

The consequence of this debate was a great exhibition of work that had been created in the classes of HfG and showcased the successful balancing of art and science. The show was initially in Ulm and Stuttgart in 1963, later in the Neue Sammlung, Munich, and in the Stedelijk Museum Amsterdam. In addition to the fundamental debate over curriculum, changes were made in the constitution and the reintroduction of a single rector to replace the Board of Governors.

=== Closure of HfG ===
'Family' squabbles over the direction of the curriculum, led to a press attack in 1963 against HfG. The Parliament of Baden-Wuerttemberg repeatedly discussed whether the school deserved subsidies. The problems were becoming more frequent. After the unsuccessful Parliament demand that HfG join the Ulm School of Engineering, Federal subsidies were abolished and the financial situation became untenable.

With the cessation of grants, the School Foundation was in debt. In 1968 some teachers were dismissed because of the difficult financial situation and the number of classes was reduced. In November, the Regional Parliament voted to withdraw all funding, therefore, the school was closed amid protests later that same year.

== Curriculum ==
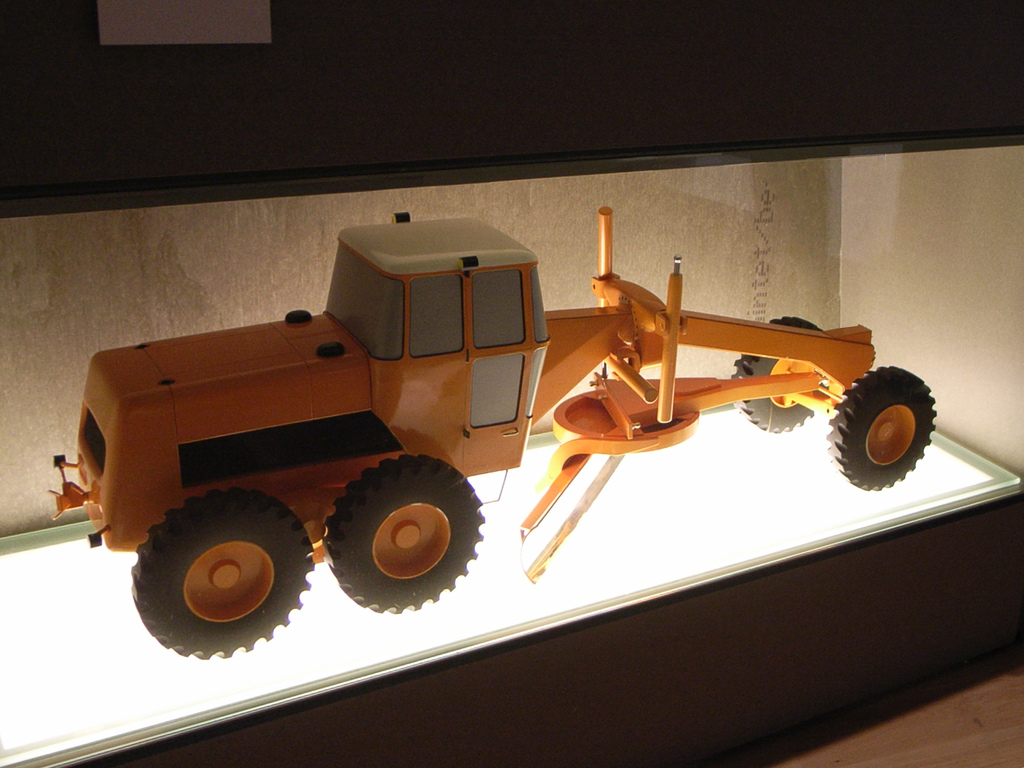
Vehicle designed by Klaus Krippendorff for the final graduation project of Product Design.

The curriculum lasted 4 years. The first year was devoted to the basic design course (Vorkurs) that was intended to offset the deficit in primary and secondary education in terms of creative project activity.

The second and third years were for elective specialization: Product Design, Industrialized Building, Visual Communication and Information, with Filmmaking being added later.

The last year of study was intended for thesis. The plan was subject to investigations that were made in regard to new approaches to design and which were then implemented in each department of the specialties.

=== Basic Course ===
Students of all programs shared the same basic design course, which lasted a year. This course was mandatory before proceeding to one of the five specialization programs offered by the institution. The course content was:

- Visual experiments: two- and three-dimensional studies based on the perceptions and teachings of symmetry and topology.
- Workshops: wood, metal, plastics, photography, etc..
- Presentation: constructive drawing, writing, language, freehand, etc.
- Methodology: introduction to logic, mathematics, combinatorics and topology.

=== Department of Product Design ===
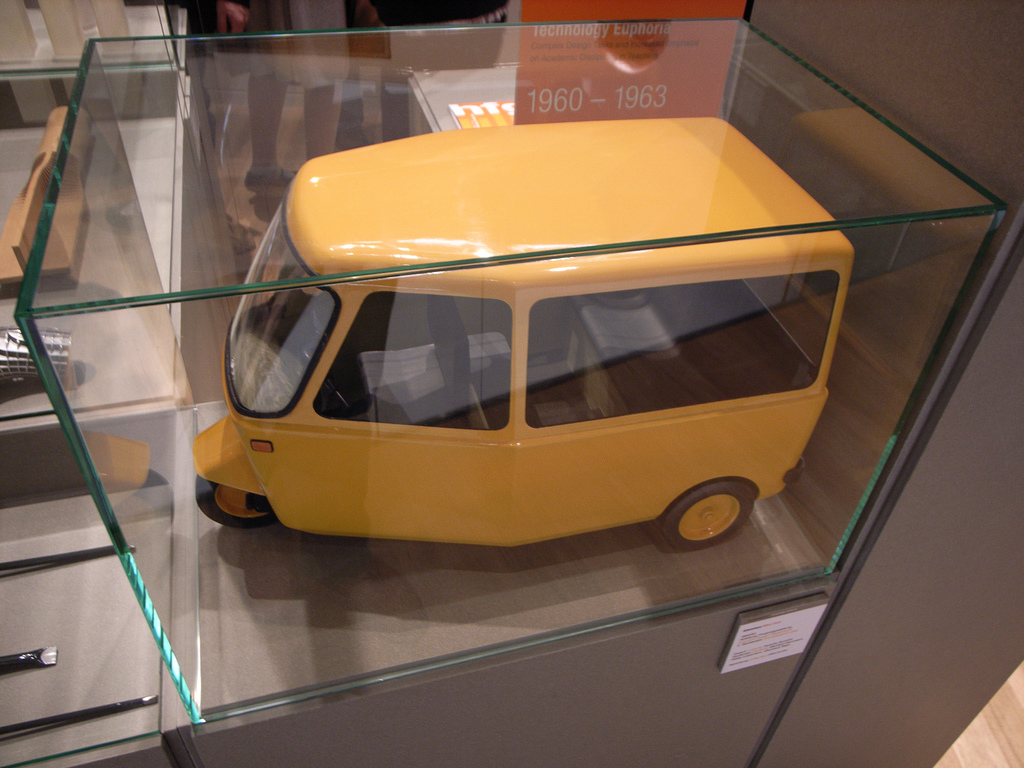
Project Scooter-Van of the second year of Product Design.

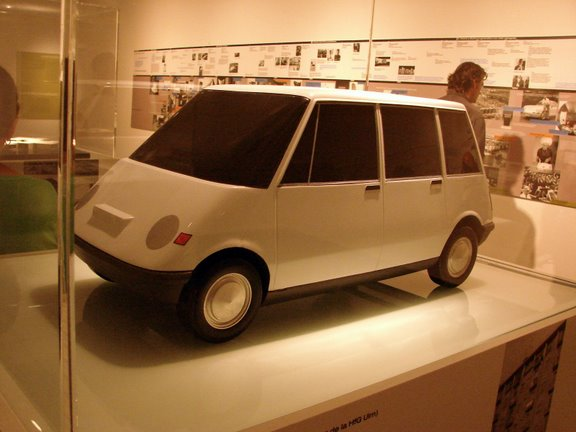
Design by Michael Conrad, Pio Manzù and Fritz Busch.

The product design department was the one who had more achievements and that radically changed the vision of industrial design. The development of new methods of mass production during the Second World War implored the designer to stop focusing primarily on the artistic point of view of the profession. Therefore, HfG teaching put increased emphasis on science and technology considerations, more in keeping with the times, and on industrial production processes that determine the final product quality and affect the product aesthetic form.

- Instruction in manufacturing: product design, operational organization, processes, procedures, calculations.
- Technologies: Ferrous metals, nonferrous metals, wood, plastics and forming technologies.
- Construction techniques.
- Mathematical analysis of operations: Group theory, statistics, standardization.
- Scientific theories.
- Ergonomics: Human-machine systems.
- Theories of Perception, especially social
- Mechanics: Kinematic, dynamic and static.
- Copyright and miscellaneous.

=== Department of Visual Communication ===
At first the department was called Visual Design, but it quickly became clear their goal was to solve design problems in the area of mass media, so that in the 1956/56 academic year the name changed to Visual Communication Department.

The curriculum included the development and implementation of visual reports, news systems and transmission media. Emphasis included the field of planning and analysis of modern means of communication, with a clear focus on the illustrative arts. Maldonado also introduced the study of semiotics. This department worked closely with the Department of Information. Although HfG distanced itself from an affiliation with the mass media advertising industry.

The HfG worked primarily in the area of persuasive communication in areas such as vehicular and pedestrian traffic sign systems, plans for technical equipment, visual translation of scientific content to be readily understood and unity of company communications materials.

== Teaching approach ==
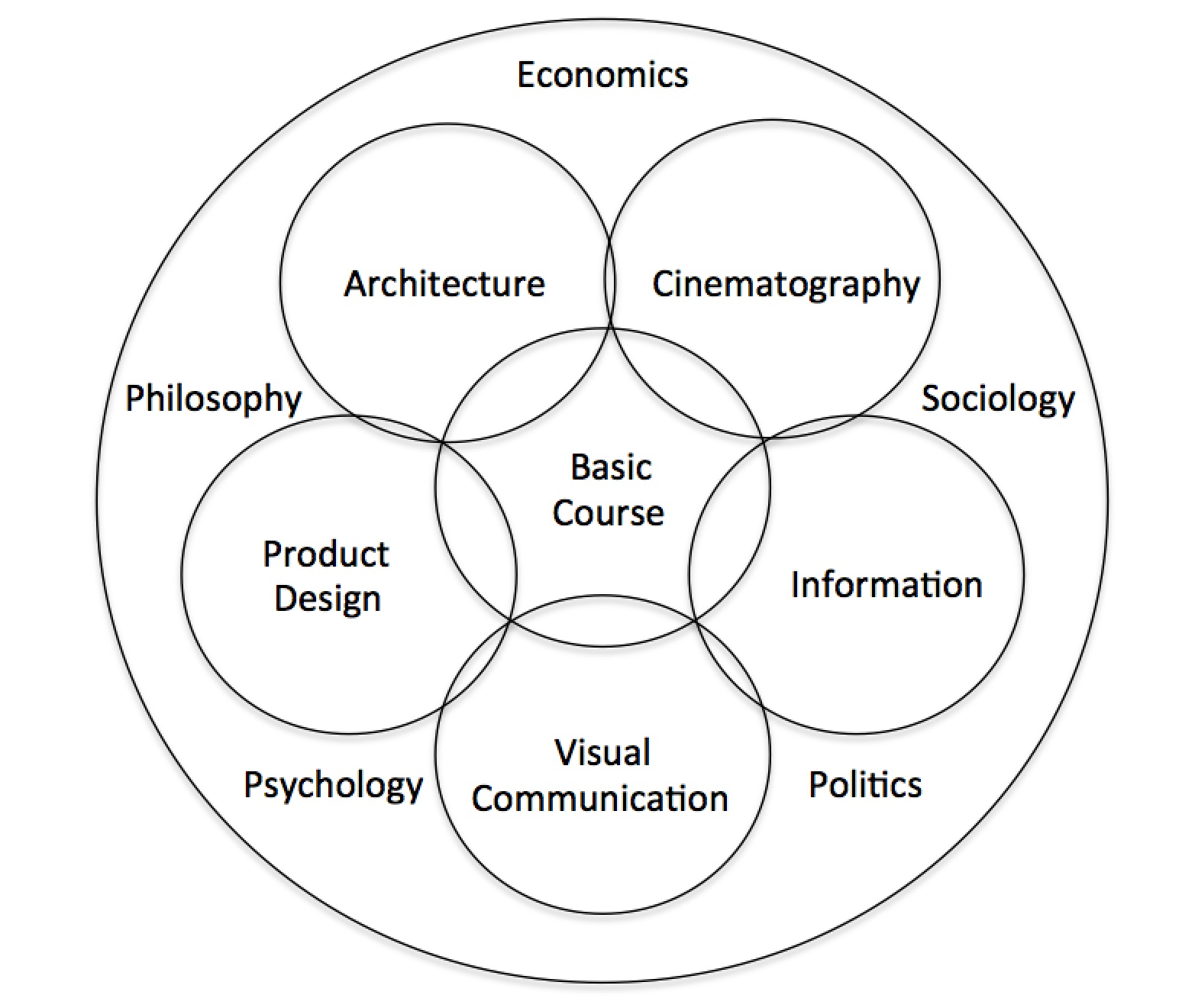
Schematic teaching of HFG Ulm. The school design was characterized by formulating a scheme based education in art and science.

In the early years of operation, and with the direction of Max Bill, the teaching of the school was guided by the principles of the Bauhaus, where the designer had a profile of being much more artistic than analytic. Based on the discrepancies between Bill's approach and that of other teachers, including the systems principles of Tomás Maldonado, the school shifted its ideology to a more methodological and structured field of study, but one that also strongly embraced aesthetics as a primary factor. This resulted in an academic program with a common basic course and an introduction to consolidated theoretical disciplines. The new design teaching approach became known as the "Ulm Model" which significantly influenced worldwide design education, especially industrial design, as the HfG reputation spread and many HfG graduates established Ulm-influenced education programs around the globe.

== Collaboration with Braun ==
Midway through the 1950s, the HfG and Braun, began a phase of cooperation. Braun needed to stand out from the competition and asked Otl Aicher, Hans Gugelot, and students to work on new designs for the company. Dieter Rams, who was a newly hired Braun designer, collaborated with HfG on developing the forward-looking Braun product design approach. With this partnership the "Braun style" was developed, and according to Tomás Maldonado, "the style differed from Olivetti who sought unity in variety, while the style of Braun sought unity in the product and its coherence with other products. Because of this, the Braun-HfG collaboration was a formidable test bench for the design of "honest" form and coherent identity as an alternative to the random "styling" of individual objects.

== Legacy ==
Until the founding of the Ulm HfG in 1953, there was no systematic approach of design education. HfG pioneered the integration of science and art, thereby creating a teaching of design based on a structured problem-solving approach: reflections on the problems of use by people, knowledge of materials and production processes, methods of analysis and synthesis, choice and founded projective alternatives, the emphasis on scientific and technical disciplines, the consideration of ergonomics, the integration of aesthetics, the understanding of semiotics and a close academic relationship with industry. In concept, the "Ulm Model" represented early foundation principles of the design management discipline.

The Ulm School of Design buildings designed by Max Bill and the surrounding green spaces are well maintained, used by various organizations and considered important heritage.

== Exhibits ==
Between September 2011 and April 2012 the Disseny Hub Barcelona held an exhibition about the Ulm School of Design. It was named systems design. the ulm school.

== See also ==
- Braun
- Industrial design
- Bauhaus

=== Notable HfG instructors ===
- Josef Albers (1953–55) – guest
- Otl Aicher (1954–66) – staff
- Bruce Archer (1960–62) – guest
- Max Bense (1954–58, 1966) – staff
- Max Bill (1953–57) – rector; staff
- Rodolfo Bonetto (1961–65)
- Gui Bonsiepe (1955–59) – staff
- Dr. Käte Hamburger (1956–58) – guest
- Johannes Itten (1954–55) – guest
- Alexander Kluge (1962–68) – staff
- Martin Krampen (1967–?)
- Herbert Lindinger (1962–68)
- Tomás Maldonado (1954–67) – rector; staff
- Beate Mainka-Jellinghaus (1967–68) – guest
- Abraham Moles (1961–66) – staff
- Helene Nonné-Schmidt (19??) – staff
- Frei Otto (1958–60) – guest
- Walter Peterhans (1953–59) – guest
- Edgar Reitz (1963–68) – staff
- Horst Rittel (1958–63) – staff
- Friedrich Vordemberge-Gildewart (1954–62) – staff
- Konrad Wachsmann (19??) – staff
