= Max Bill =

Swiss architect, artist, painter and designer

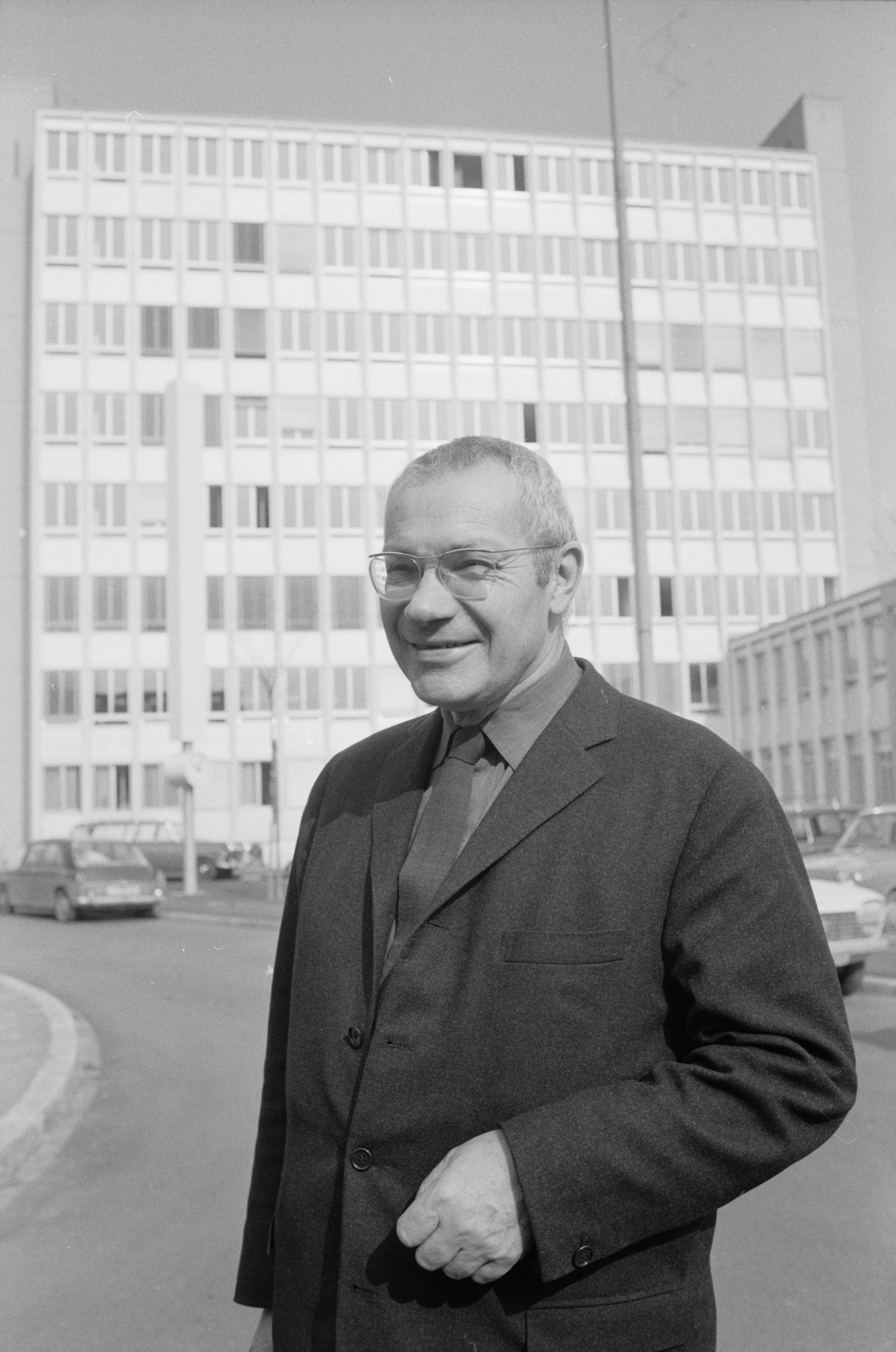
- Bill in 1970
- Born: 22 December 1908; Winterthur, Switzerland
- Died: 9 December 1994 (aged 85); Berlin, Germany
- Occupations: Architect; Artist; Painter; Typeface designer Industrial designer Graphic designer
- Awards: Praemium Imperiale (1993)

Max Bill (22 December 1908 – 9 December 1994) was a Swiss architect, artist, painter, typeface designer, industrial designer, and graphic designer.

== Early life and education ==
Bill was born in Winterthur. After an apprenticeship as a silversmith during 1924–1927, Bill took up studies at the Bauhaus in Dessau under many teachers including Wassily Kandinsky, Paul Klee and Oskar Schlemmer from 1927 to 1929, after which he moved to Zurich.

== Work ==
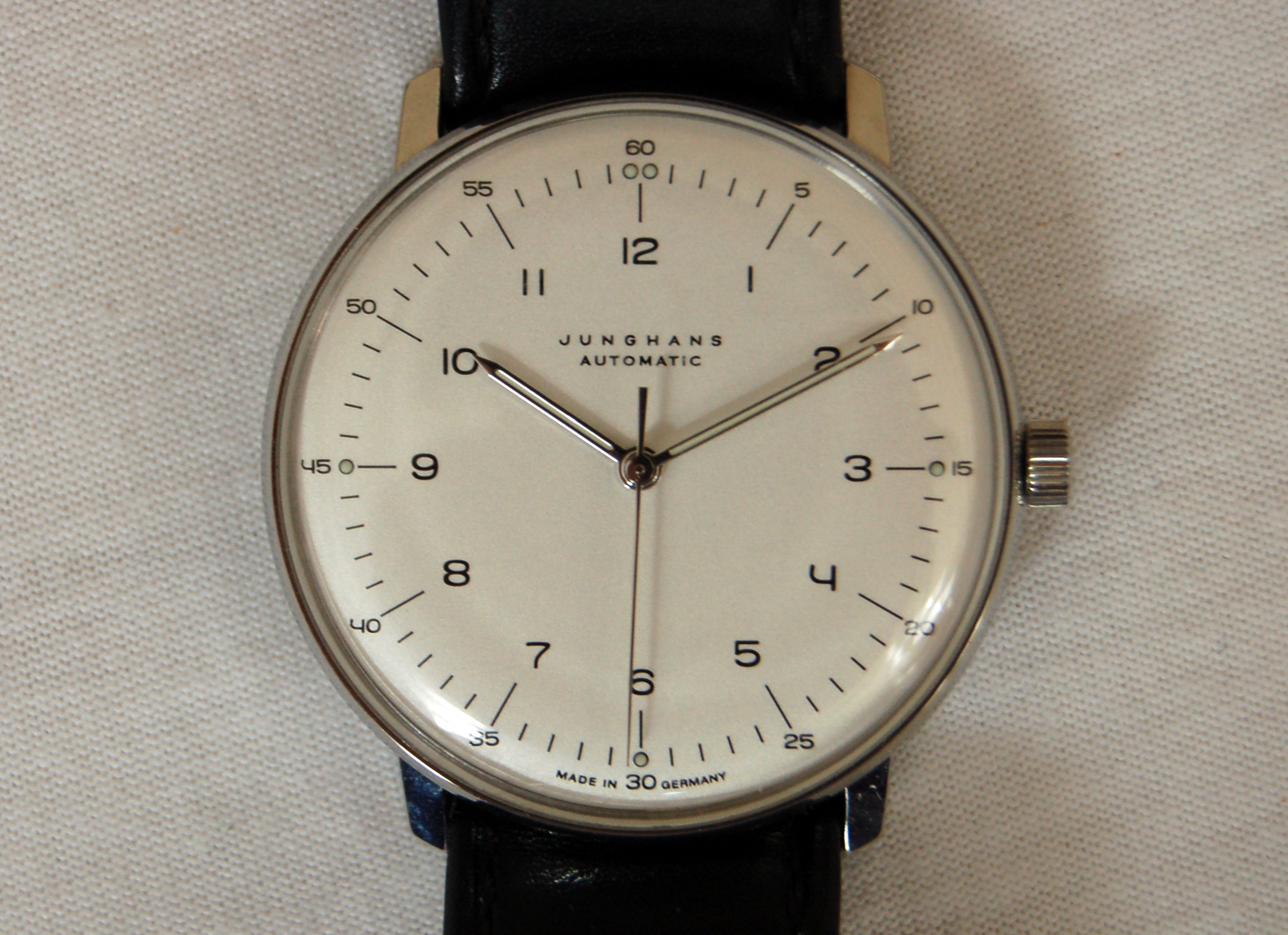
Junghans Max Bill Automatik

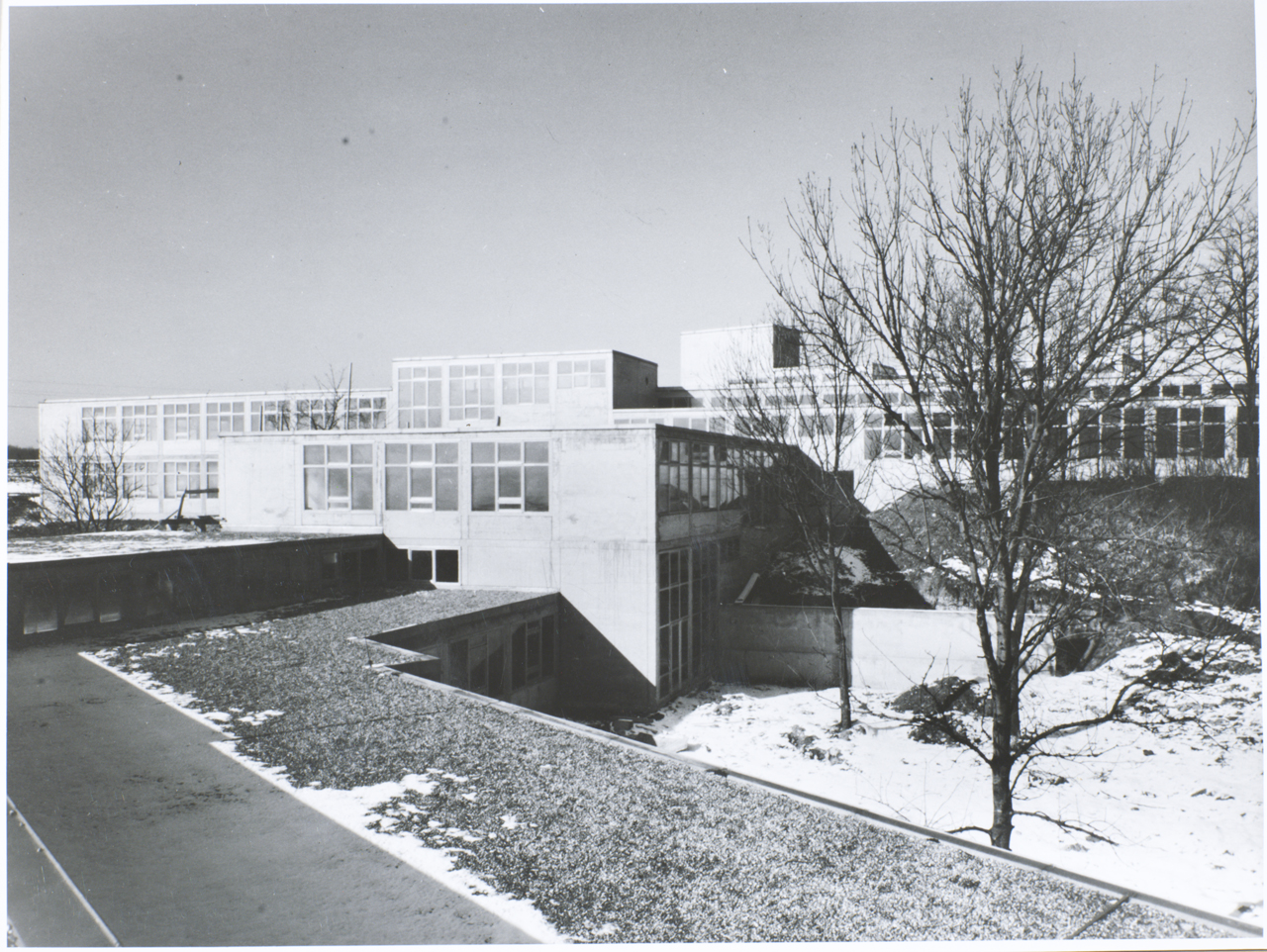
Building Ulm HfG, photography by Hans G. Conrad

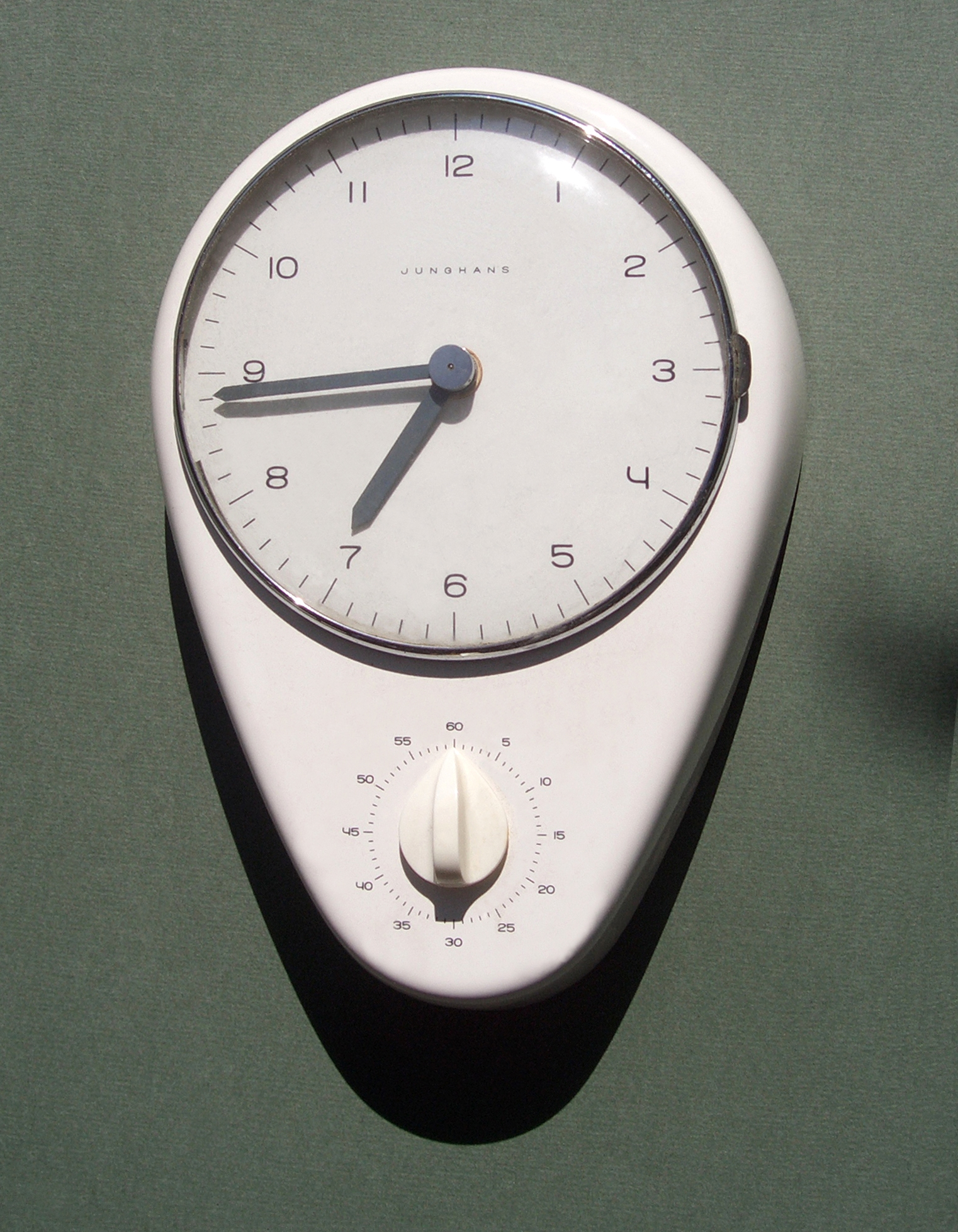
Junghans clock, design by Max Bill

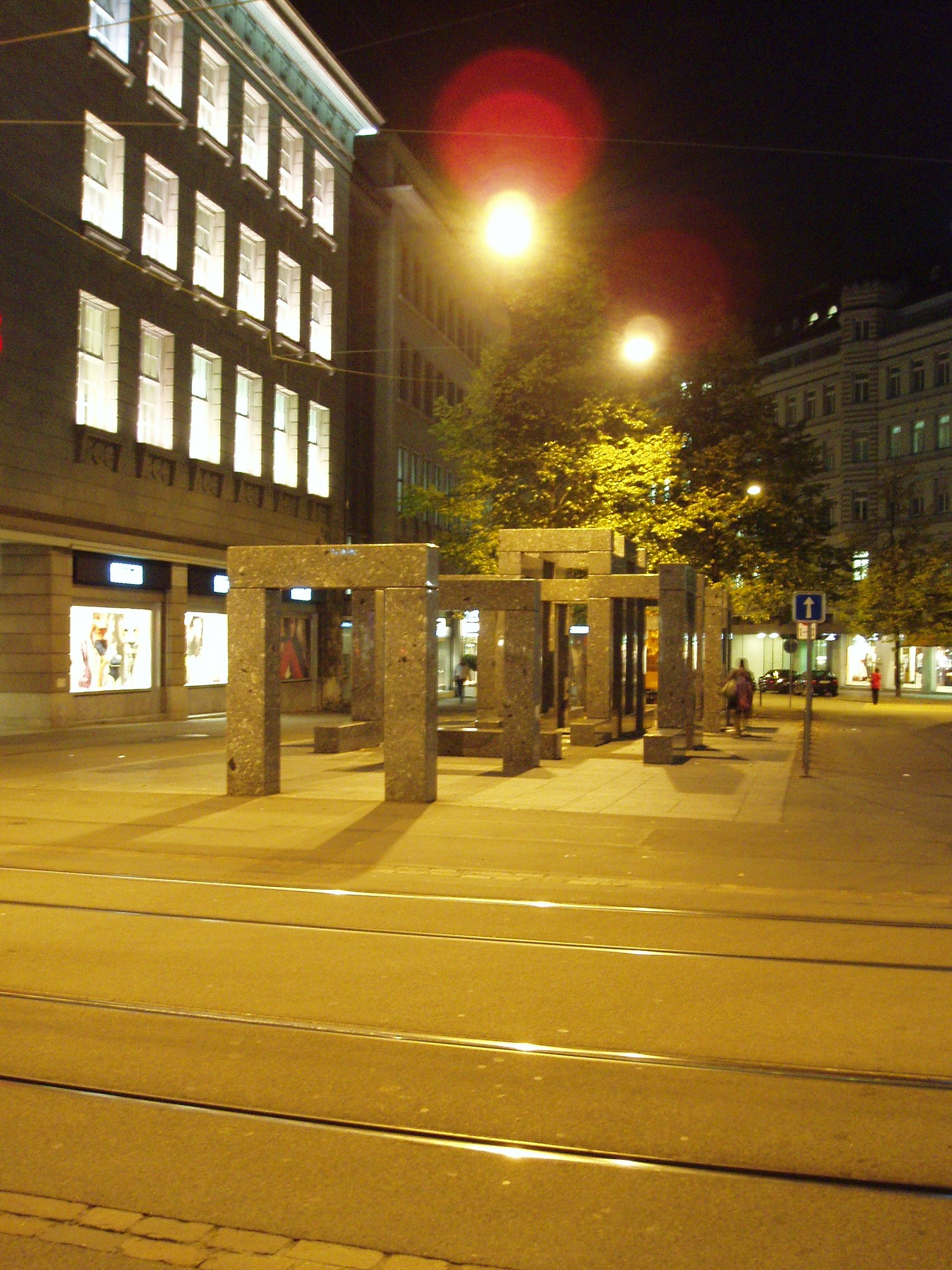
Pavillon-Skulptur (1983), Zürich, by Max Bill

=== Art and design ===
After working on graphic designs for the few modern buildings being constructed, he built his first work, his own house and studio (1932–3) in Zurich-Höngg. From 1937 onwards he was a prime mover behind the Allianz group of Swiss artists.

Bill is widely considered the single most decisive influence on Swiss graphic design beginning in the 1950s with his theoretical writing and progressive work. His connection to the days of the Modern Movement gave him special authority. As an industrial designer, his work is characterized by a clarity of design and precise proportions. Examples are the elegant clocks and watches designed for Junghans, a long-term client. Among Bill's most notable product designs is the "Ulmer Hocker" of 1954, a stool that can also be used as a shelf element, a speaker's desk, a tablet or a side table. Although the stool was a creation of Bill and Ulm school designer Hans Gugelot, it is often called "Bill Hocker" because the first sketch on a cocktail napkin was Bill's work.

As a designer and artist, Bill sought to create forms which visually represent the New Physics of the early 20th century. He sought to create objects so that the new science of form could be understood by the senses: that is as a concrete art. Thus Bill is not a rationalist – as is typically thought – but rather a phenomenologist. One who understands embodiment as the ultimate expression of a concrete art. In this way he is not so much extending as re-interpreting Bauhaus theory. Yet curiously Bill's critical interpreters have not really grasped this fundamental issue. He made spare geometric paintings and spherical sculptures, some based on the Möbius strip, in stone, wood, metal and plaster. His architectural work included an office building in Germany, a radio studio in Zurich, and a bridge in eastern Switzerland.

He continued to produce architectural designs, such as those for a museum of contemporary art (1981) in Florence and for the Bauhaus Archive (1987) in Berlin. In 1982 he also entered a competition for an addition to the Neue Nationalgalerie in Berlin, built to a design by Mies van der Rohe. Pavillon-Skulptur (1979–83), a large granite sculpture, was installed adjacent to the Bahnhofstrasse, Zürich in 1983. As is often the case with modern art in public places, the installation generated some controversy. Endlose Treppe (1991), a sculpture made of North American granite, was designed for the philosopher Ernst Bloch.

In 1982 he was awarded the Sir Misha Black award and was added to the College of Medallists.

=== Teaching ===
In 1944, Bill became a professor at the Kunstgewerbeschule Zürich. In 1953, alongside Inge Aicher-Scholl and Otl Aicher, he founded the Ulm School of Design (German: Hochschule für Gestaltung – HfG Ulm) in Ulm, Germany, a design school initially created in the tradition of the Bauhaus and which later developed a new design education approach integrating art and science. The school was notable for its inclusion of semiotics as a field of study. The school closed in 1968. Faculty and students included Tomás Maldonado, Otl Aicher, Josef Albers, Johannes Itten, John Lottes, Walter Zeischegg, and Peter Seitz.

Bill was a professor at the Hochschule für bildende Künste Hamburg and chair of Environmental Design from 1967 to 1974. In 1973 he became an associate member of the Royal Flemish Academy of Science, Literature and Fine Art in Brussels. In 1976 he became a member of the Berlin Academy of Arts. In addition to his teaching, Bill wrote and lectured extensively on art, architecture and design, appearing at symposiums and design conferences around the world. In particular, he wrote books about Le Corbusier, Kandinsky, Ludwig Mies van der Rohe, and artistic theory.

== Exhibitions ==
Bill executed many public sculptures in Europe and exhibited extensively in galleries and museums, including a retrospective at the Kunsthaus Zürich in 1968–69. He had his first exhibition in the United States at the Staempfli Gallery in New York City in 1963 and was the subject of retrospectives at the Albright-Knox Art Gallery in Buffalo and the Los Angeles County Museum of Art in 1974. He participated in documentas I (1955), II (1959), and III (1964). In 1993, he received the Praemium Imperiale for sculpture, awarded by the Emperor of Japan.

Bill is credited with having been "the spark that lighted the fuse of Brazil's artistic revolution" and the country's "movement toward concrete art" with his 1951 retrospective at the São Paulo Museum of Modern Art. He strongly influenced Brazilian artists like Franz Weissmann.

An exhibition of Bill's graphic work, Max Bill. Multiplied Artworks as Originals Artworks (1938–1994), was shown at the Museu Fundación Juan March, Palma (25 February - 30 May 2015) and Museo de Arte Abstracto Español, Cuenca (24 June - 18 September 2015).

From 16 October 2015 - 17 January 2016, the Fundación Juan March, Madrid exhibited Max Bill, the first retrospective of his work exhibited in Spain. The exhibition included 170 works spanning Bill’s career and body of work.

== Private life ==
After a liaison with Nusch Éluard, Bill married the cellist and photographer Binia Mathilde Spoerri in January 1931. She died in 1988. From 1974 he was living together with art historian Angela Thomas; they married in 1991.

Bill was also involved in politics. He was elected to the Zurich municipal council in 1961. From 1967 to 1971, he served as a member of the Swiss National Council.

Bill died en route to a hospital after collapsing from a heart attack at Berlin Tegel Airport. He was 85 and lived in Zumikon, a Zürich suburb. In 1996, Jakob Bill, the son of Max, founded the Swiss Max Bill Foundation (max, binia + jakob bill stiftung) and implemented the idea of his father. The purpose of the foundation is to collect and take care of the works in possession of the Bill family, as well as the promotion of scientific research.

Because Bill had not settled his estate, the legacy was divided equally between his son and his widow. The two heirs each independently set up a foundation.

In 1997 Angela Thomas founded the Max Bill Georges Vantongerloo Foundation, which is based in the house and studio built by Max Bill in 1967/68 in Zumikon. The foundation aims to make representative parts of the work of the two artist friends Vantongerloo and Bill as well as Haus Bill Zumikon accessible to the public.

== Gallery ==
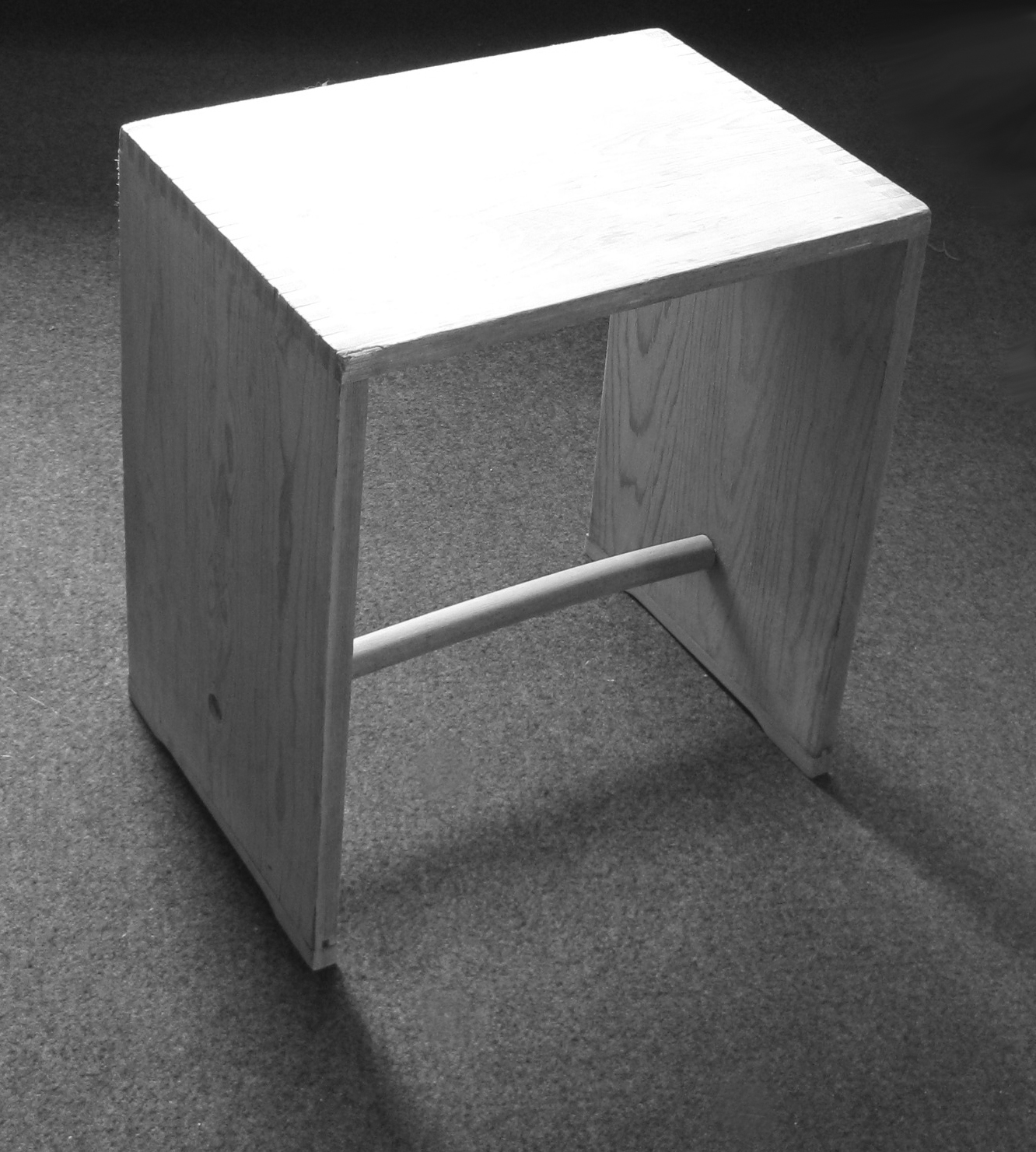
Ulmer Hocker (Ulmer Stool) (1954)

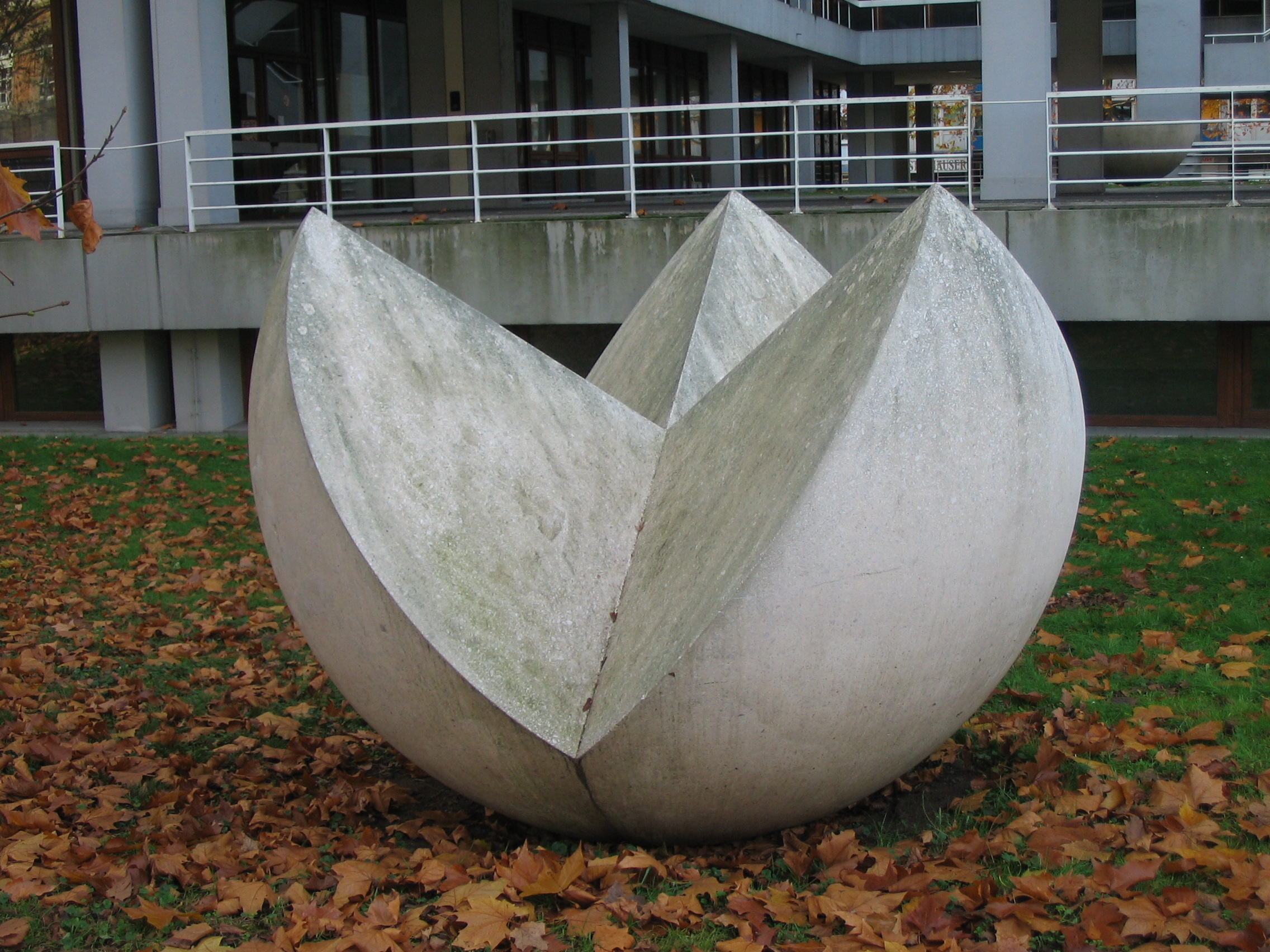
Part of the work Familie von fünf halben Kugeln (Family of Five Half Balls) (1966) in Karlsruhe

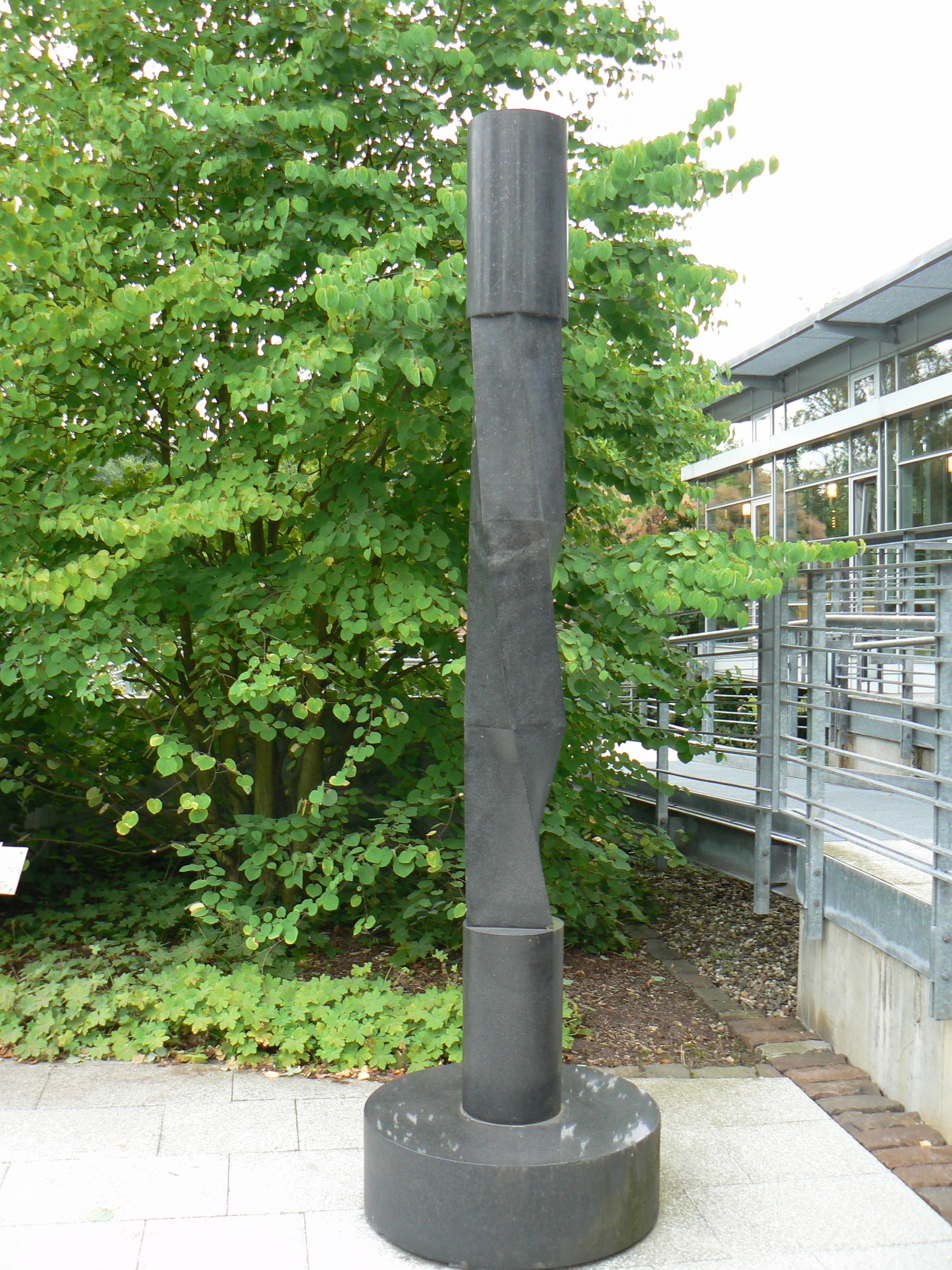
Säule mit 3-6-eckigen Querschnitten (Column with 3–6 angular cross sections) (1966) in Marl

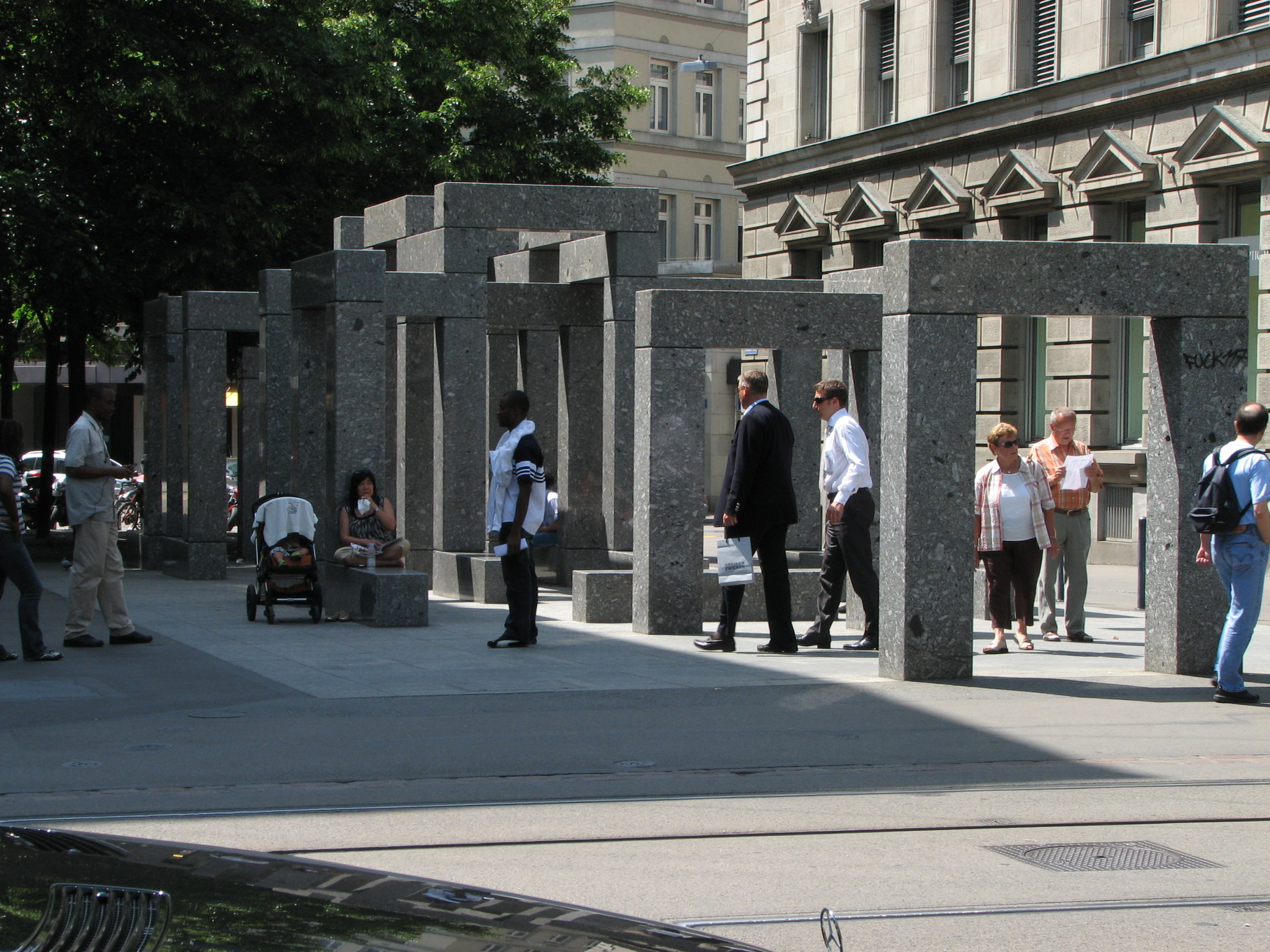
Pavillon-Skulptur (Pavilion Sculpture) (1983) in Zürich

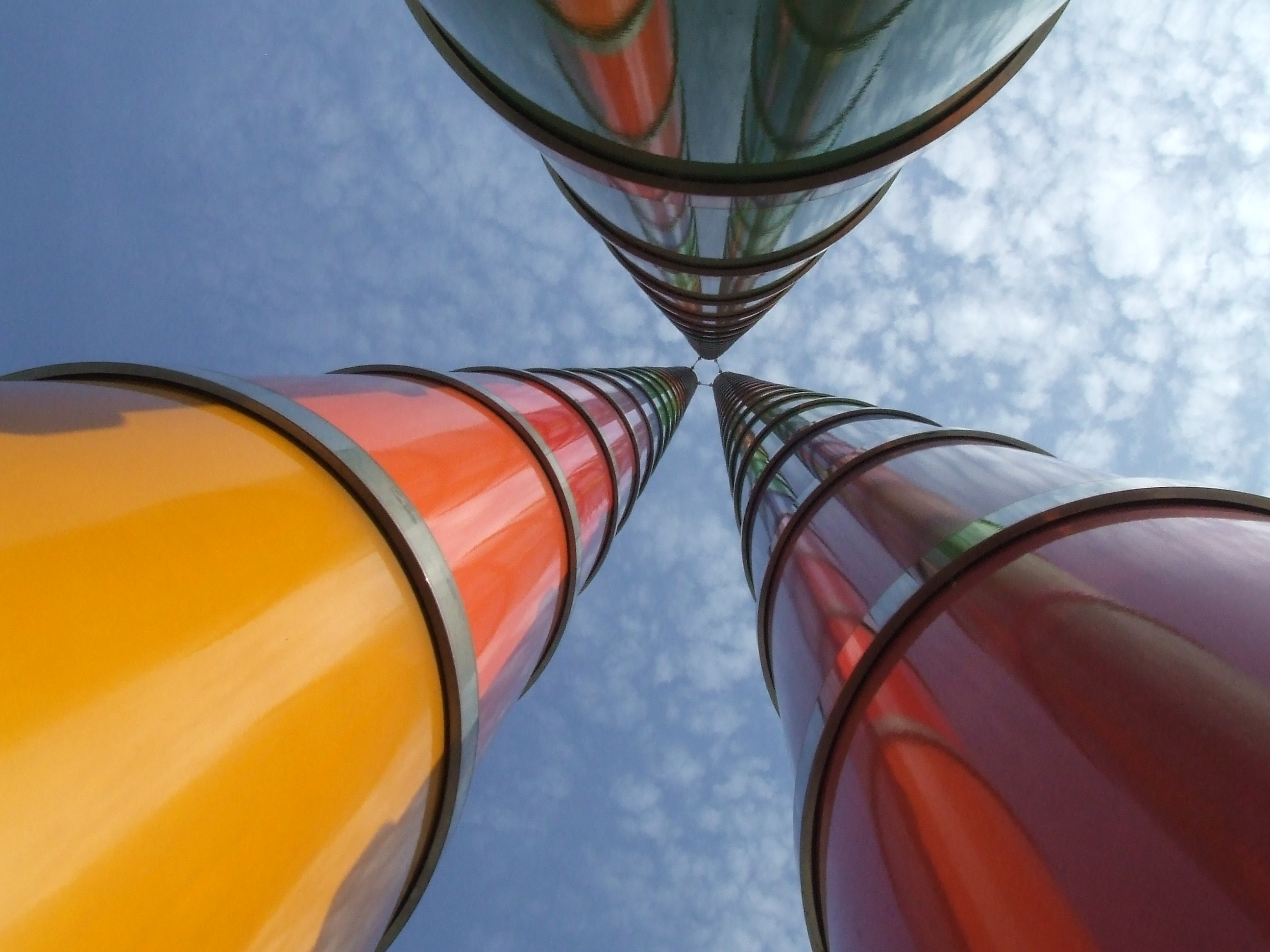
Bildsäulen-Dreiergruppe (Picture column tripartite group) (1989) in Stuttgart

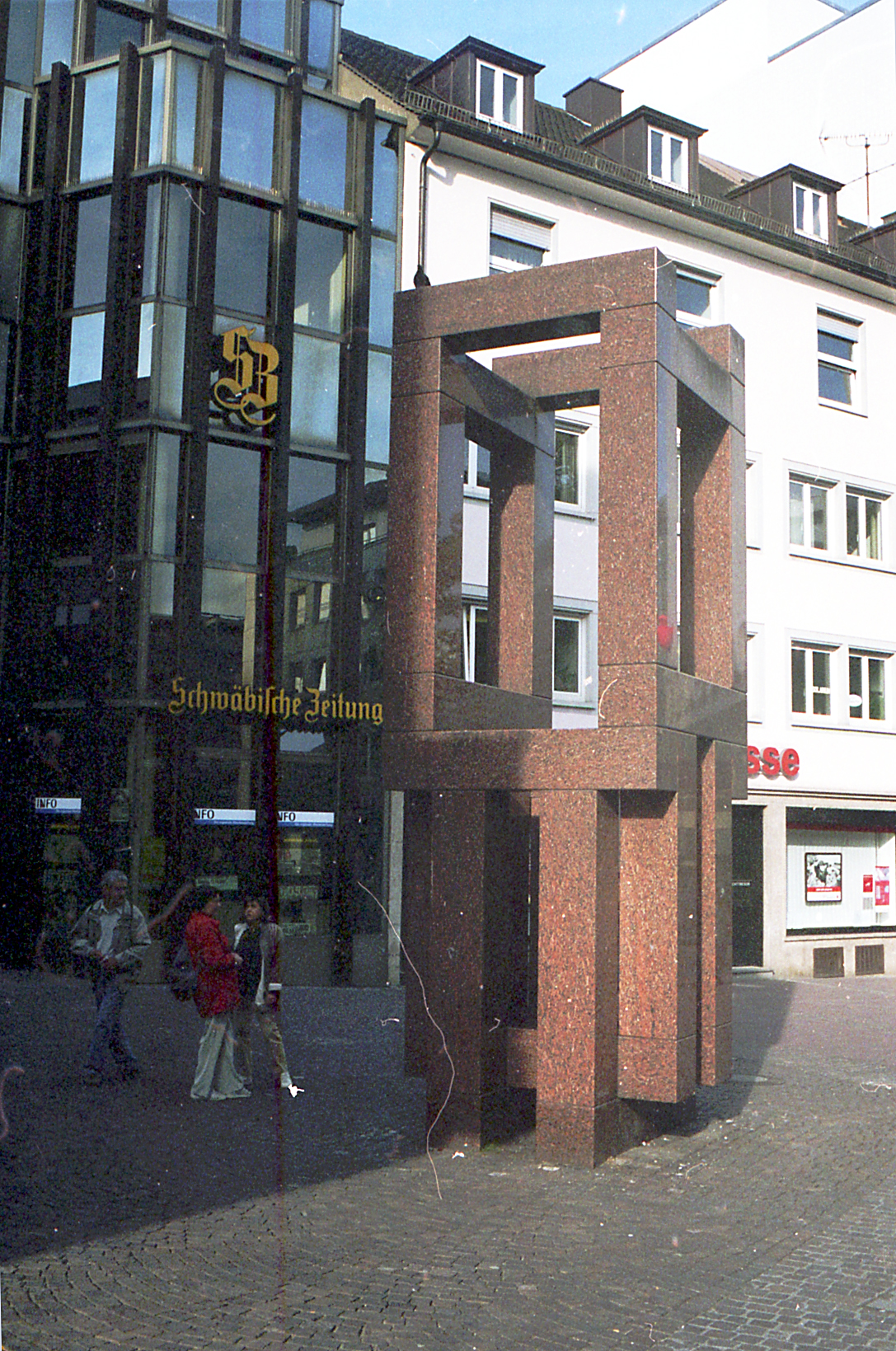
Einstein Denkmal (Einstein Monument) (1982) in Ulm

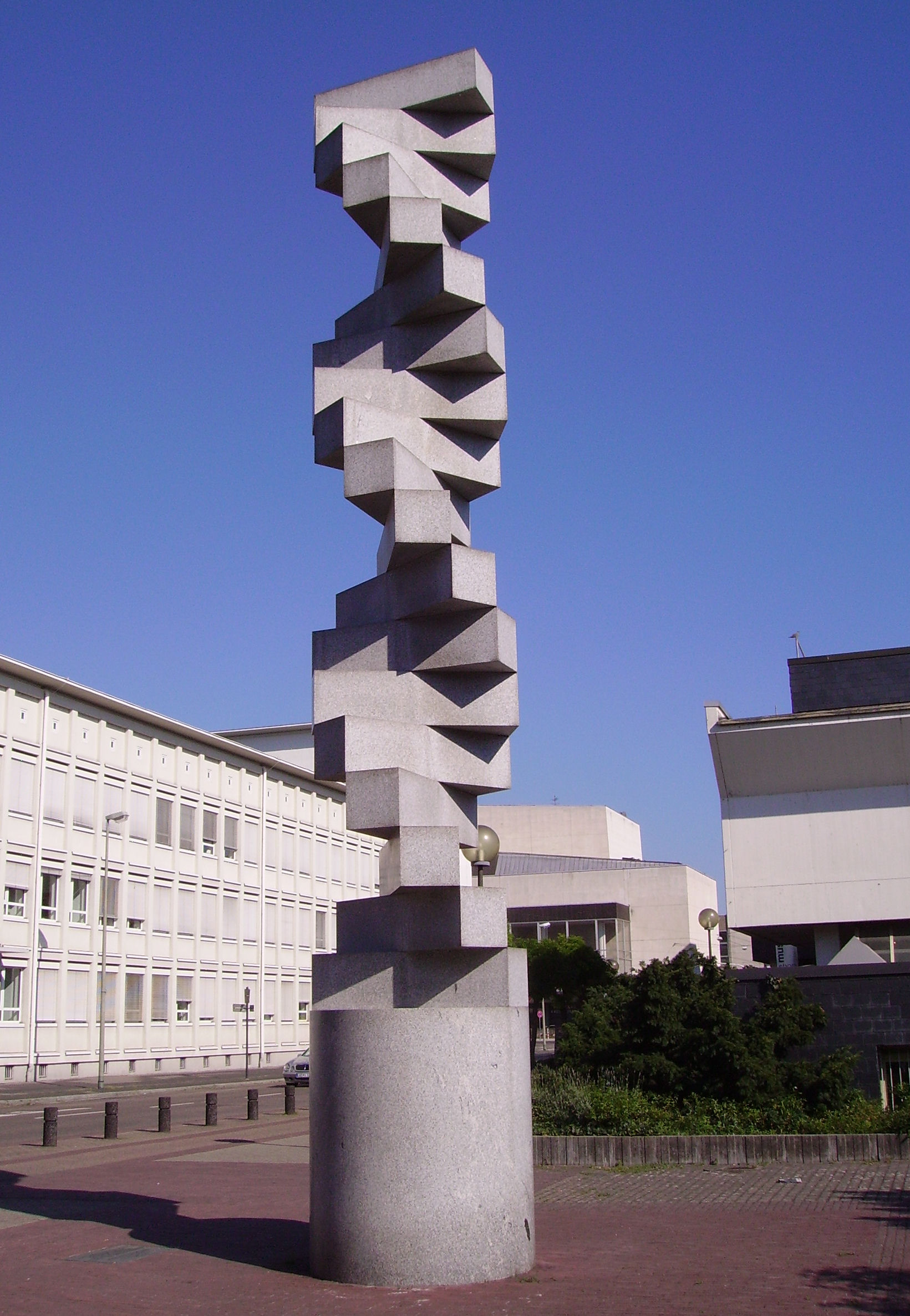
Endlose Treppe (Endless Stairs) (1991) in Ludwigshafen

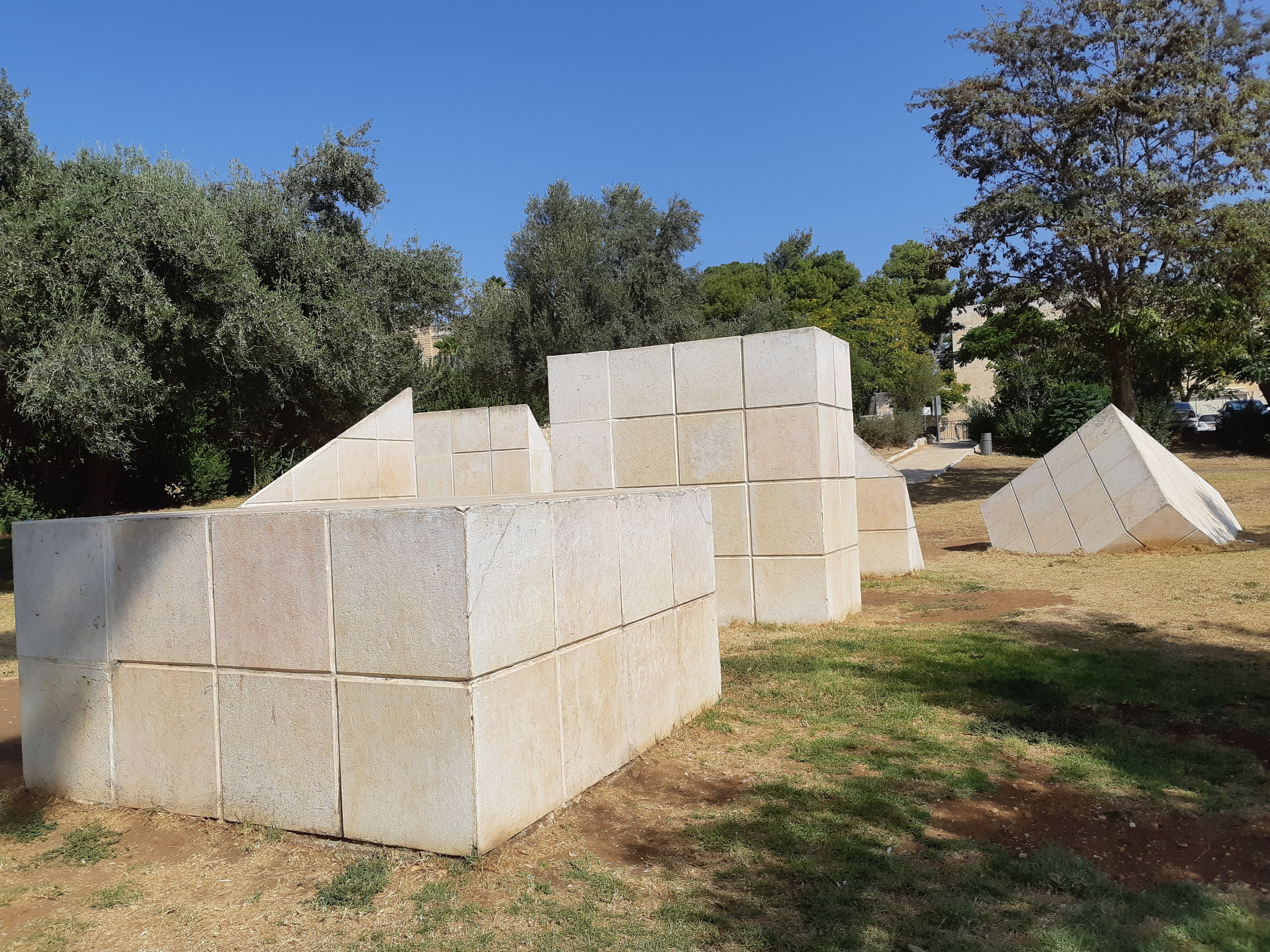
4 cubes at Blumfield Garden in Jerusalem

== Literature ==
- Jakob Bill: Max Bill am Bauhaus. Benteli, Bern 2008, ISBN 978-3-7165-1554-9.
- Max Bill: Funktion und Funktionalismus. Schriften 1945–1988. Benteli, Bern 2008, ISBN 978-3-7165-1522-8.
- Max Bill, Retrospektive. Skulpturen Gemälde Graphik 1928–1987. (Texte Christoph Vitali, Eduard Hüttinger, Max Bill.) Katalog Schirn Kunsthalle, Frankfurt/Zürich/Stuttgart 1987 ISBN 3-922608-79-5.
- Thomas Buchsteiner und Otto Lotze:max bill, maler, bildhauer, architekt, designer. Ostfildern-Ruit 2005, ISBN 3-7757-1641-6.
- Luciano Caramel, Angela Thomas: Max Bill. Pinacoteca Communale Casa Rusca, Locarno / Fidia Edizione d'Arte, Lugano 1991, ISBN 88-7269-011-0.
- Roberto Fabbri: Max Bill in Italia. Lo spazio logico dell'architettura, Bruno Mondadori Editore, Milano 2011, ISBN 978-88-6159-606-1.
- Roberto Fabbri: Max Bill. Espaces, Infolio Éditions, Gollion – Paris, 2017, ISBN 978-2-88474-463-8.
- Gerd Fischer: Der Koloss von Frankfurt: Die „Kontinuität“ von Max Bill. In: Mitteilungen der Deutschen Mathematiker-Vereinigung, Heft 4/1999, S. 22–23.
- Eduard Hüttinger: Max Bill. abc Verlag, Zürich 1977, ISBN 3-85504-043-5.
- Eduard Hüttinger: Max Bill. Edition Cantz, Stuttgart 1987 (erweiterte Ausgabe) ISBN 3-922608-79-5
- Gregor Nickel und Michael Rottmann: Mathematische Kunst: Max Bill in Stuttgart. In: Mitteilungen der Deutschen Mathematiker-Vereinigung, Band 14, Heft 3/2006, S. 150–159.
- Arturo Carlo Quintavalle: Max Bill. Università Commune Provincia di Parma, Quaderni 38, 1977.
- Thomas Reinke und Gordon Shrigley: Max Bill: HfG Ulm: Drawing and Redrawing: Atelierwohnungen, Studentenwohnturm. marmalade, 2006, ISBN 978-0-9546597-1-4.
- Emil Schwarz: Im Wissen der Zeit oder Der Sinn, den die Schönheit erzeugt, Hommage à Max Bill, ein dichterischer Nachvollzug mit dem Essay Wirklichkeit oder Realität. NAP Verlag, Zürich 2010, ISBN 978-3-9523615-4-2.
- Werner Spies: Kontinuität. Granit-Monolith von Max Bill. Deutsche Bank, 1986, ISBN 3-925086-01-3.
- René Spitz: hfg ulm. der blick hinter den vordergrund. die politische geschichte der hochschule für gestaltung ulm 1953–1968. Stuttgart/London 2002. ISBN 3-932565-16-9. (Zur Geschichte der HfG Ulm von der Gründung 1953 bis zur Schließung 1968.)
- Margit Staber: "Max Bill". Methuen, London 1964. (Art in Progress series)
- Angela Thomas: A Subversive Gleam: Max Bill and His Time. 1908–1939. Translated from German by Fiona Elliott. Zurich, Hauser & Wirth Publishers, 2022, ISBN 978-3-906915-40-1
- Angela Thomas: Constructive Clarity: Max Bill and His Time. 1940–1952. Translated from German by Fiona Elliott. Zurich, Hauser & Wirth Publishers, 2024, ISBN 978-3-906915-69-2
- Angela Thomas: Max Bill: Bauhaus Constellations. Hauser & Wirth Publishers, Zürich 2019.
- Angela Thomas: Max Bill Georges Vantongerloo: A Working Friendship. Annely Juda Fine Art, London 1996, ISBN 1-870280-57-1
- Udo Weilacher: Kontinuität (Max Bill). In: Udo Weilacher: Visionäre Gärten. Die modernen Landschaften von Ernst Cramer. Basel/Berlin/Boston 2001, ISBN 3-7643-6568-4.
- Da Silva Paiva, Rodrigo Otávio: Max Bill no Brasil, 2011, ISBN 978-3-943347-13-5.
- Museum Marta Herford (Editors): Max Bill: No Beginning No End. Scheidegger & Spiess, 2008, ISBN 978-3-85881-578-1.
- Zentrum Paul Klee (Editors): Max Bill global: An Artist Building Bridges. Scheidegger & Spiess, 2021, ISBN 978-3-85881-877-5.

== Documentaries ==
- Max Bill – The Master's Vision (Erich Schmid, 2008)

== Podcasts ==
- Interview with Angela Thomas (widow of Max Bill), Erich Schmid (author of "Max Bill – The Master's Vision") and Martin Mäntele (Head of HfG Archiv, Ulm) on bauhaus faces podcast, host: Dr. Anja Guttenberger, published on 18 Aug, 2025
- Interview with Martin Mäntele (Head of HfG Archiv, Ulm) about Max Bill's role at the HfG and the development of the Ulm School of Design on bauhaus faces podcast, host: Dr. Anja Guttenberger, published on 23 Aug, 2025
- Interview with Angela Thomas & Erich Schmid about the life, art, and teaching of Max Bill on bauhaus faces podcast, host: Dr. Anja Guttenberger, published on 1 Sep, 2025, in German

== See also ==
- Typographica
