= Joost Schmidt =

German typographer (1893–1948)

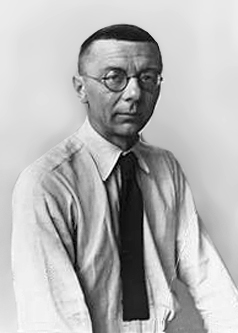
Joost Schmidt, Dessau 1932.

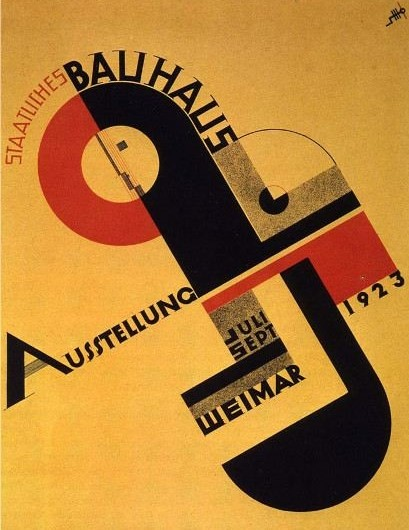
Poster for the Bauhausaustellung (1923)

Joost Schmidt (Wunstorf, 5 January 1893 - Nürnberg, 2 December 1948) was a German typographer, a teacher and master at the Bauhaus, and later a professor at the College of Visual Arts, Berlin. He was a visionary typographer and graphic designer who is best known for designing the famous poster for the 1923 Bauhaus Exhibition in Weimar, Germany.

== Studies ==
Schmidt studied art at the Grand-Ducal Saxon Academy of Fine Art in Weimar, before becoming a student at the Bauhaus School from 1919–1925, training in the wood-carving workshop. He became the master student of Max Thedy and received his diploma in painting in the winter semester of 1913/1914. When he first came to Bauhaus, Schmidt started a sculpting apprenticeship with Johannes Iiten and Oskar Schlemmer. As time went by, he became very proficient with applied graphics, having his poster displayed at the Bauhaus exhibition in 1923.

== Teaching ==
Joost Schmidt taught lettering at the school from 1925–1932; head of the sculpture workshop from 1928-1930. He was also head of the Advertising, Calligraphy, Printing, and Graphic Design department from 1928 to 1932. His focus was on geometry and shapes being included in the overall designs in art. The concepts that he taught were the contrasted theory of both elementary form and bodies being applied to space. In the years of 1929-1930, he taught life and figure drawing classes for upper division work.

== Family ==
Joost was one of three children, and endured a difficult upbringing. He pursued his work as a graphic designer despite much resistance from the Nazis. After receiving his diploma in 1914 in painting, he served in the military and was briefly a prisoner of war until he returned to his work in Germany in 1918. In 1925, he married the Bauhaus student Helene Nonne.

== Gallery ==
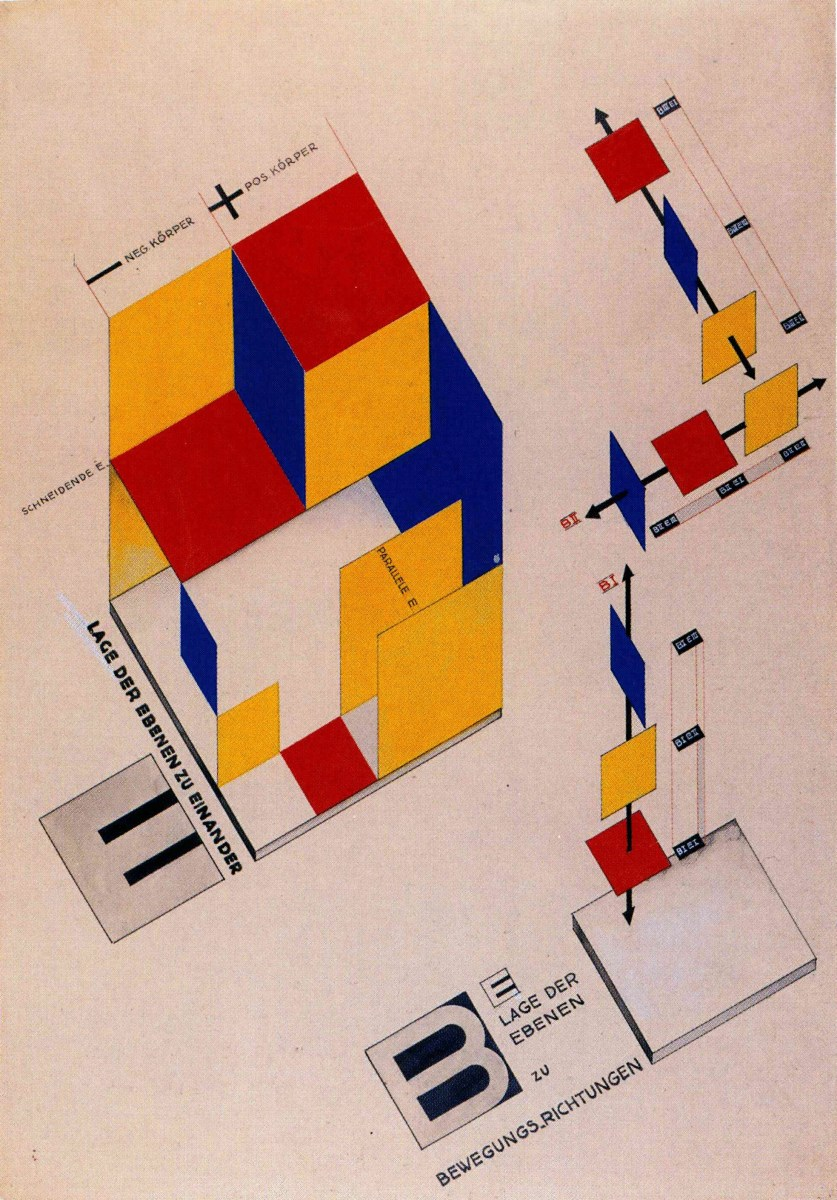
Mechanical stage design by Joost Schmidt 1925.

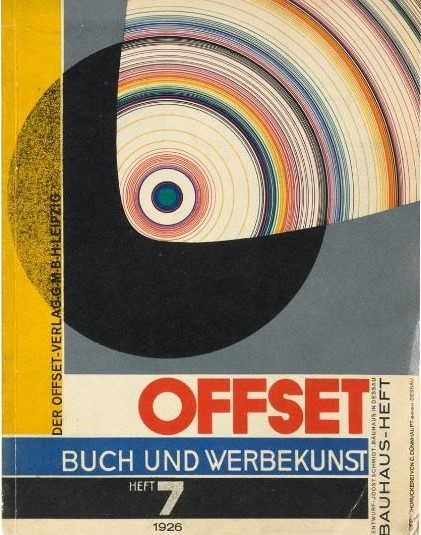
Booklett cover by Joost Schmidt 1926.
