= Deaths in April 1986 =

The following is a list of notable deaths in April 1986.

Entries for each day are listed alphabetically by surname. A typical entry lists information in the following sequence:

- Name, age, country of citizenship at birth, subsequent country of citizenship (if applicable), reason for notability, cause of death (if known), and reference.

== April 1986 ==
=== 1 ===
- Erik Bruhn, 57, Dutch ballet dancer and choreographer, lung cancer.
- Syd Copley, 80, British cricketer.
- Donald Grobe, 56, American singer.
- Theodore N. Kaufman, 76, American businessman and eugenics advocate.
- Vic Lawrence, 58, Australian rules footballer.
- Lucy Mair, 85, British anthropologist.
- Margaret Masterman, 75, British linguist.
- Kenneth E. Priebe, 73, American politician.
- Barry Robins, 41, American actor, AIDS.
- Dick Scesniak, 45, American football coach, heart attack.
- Al Sellinger, 71, American Olympic cyclist (1936).
- Shuvee, 20, American Thoroughbred racehorse.
- Tony Siano, 79, American NFL football player.
- Earl W. Vaughn, 57, American politician and judge, cancer.

=== 2 ===
- François Aman-Jean, 91, French writer.
- Floyd M. Baker, 94, Canadian politician.
- Wilfred Broadhead, 82, English cricketer.
- Bobby Dobbs, 63, American CFL football player.
- Gerald Goddard, 65, South African Olympic water polo player (1952).
- Dagbjartur Grímsson, 54, Icelandic footballer.
- Eugene Raymond Hall, 83, American zoologist.
- Lloyd A. Jeffress, 85, American acoustical scientist.
- Raymond Lapin, 67, American banking executive.
- John F. McCormick, 84, American sailor.
- Helen H. Nowlis, 72, American psychologist.
- Thomas Gerald Room, 83, Australian mathematician.
- Ben Schoeman, 81, South African politician.
- Takakura Teru, 94, Japanese writer and politician.
- Milt Trost, 73, American NFL football player.

=== 3 ===
- Geoffrey H. Arnott, 84, Australian businessman (Arnott's Group).
- Bobby Clack, 60, American actor.
- Everett T. Copenhaver, 87, American politician, member of the Wyoming House of Representatives (1939–1941).
- George Kirstein, 76, American publisher, heart attack.
- Mary C. McCall Jr., 81, American screenwriter, cancer.
- Charles Moeller, 74, Belgian Roman Catholic priest and theologian.
- Elisha Netanyahu, 73, Israeli mathematician.
- Reinhard Opitz, 51, German social scientist, cancer.
- Sir Peter Pears, 75, British singer.
- Elisabeth Radó, 86, Yugoslav singer.
- Rei, 74, Brazilian footballer.
- Mohammad Kazem Shariatmadari, 80, Iranian ayatollah.
- Nanna Svartz, 95, Swedish physician.

=== 4 ===
- Diane Barwick, 47, Canadian-born Australian anthropologist, cerebral hemorrhage.
- Maria Beruski, 26–27, Brazilian teacher, fire.
- Bill Boaks, 81, British politician and naval officer.
- Geoffrey Burton, 76, English cricketer.
- Mario Cagna, 74, Italian Roman Catholic prelate.
- Charles DeBow, 68, American fighter pilot.
- Hasted Dowker, 86, Canadian Anglican prelate.
- Rebeca Gerschman, 82, Argentine biochemist.
- Sascha Gorodnitzki, 81, Russian-born American pianist.
- Sir Laurence Hartnett, 87, Australian engineer.
- Ira V. Hiscock, 93, American bacteriologist.
- Billy Hole, 66, English motorcycle racer.
- Clive Hughes, 38, Australian politician, skin cancer.
- Zoltán Kaszab, 70, Hungarian entomologist.
- Mimmo Poli, 65, Italian actor, heart attack.
- Carlo Taranto, 64, Italian actor.
- Josef Vosolsobě, 81, Czechoslovak Olympic long jumper (1936).

=== 5 ===
- Jeanne Clery, 19, American murder victim.
- Lookout Masuku, 45, Zimbabwean militant, meningitis.
- Colin McCool, 69, Australian cricketer.
- Valentín Parera, 90, Spanish actor.
- Moshe Pearlman, 74–75, English-Israeli writer.
- Manly Wade Wellman, 82, American writer.

=== 6 ===
- José Luis de Arrese, 80, Spanish politician.
- Pesach Burstein, 89, Polish-born American comedian and actor.
- Roy Cheville, 88, American Mormon theologian.
- Glen Cooper, 70, Australian Air Force pilot.
- El Solitario, 39, Mexican professional wrestler, cardiac arrest.
- Boris Gutnikov, 54, Soviet violinist.
- Raimundo Orsi, 84, Argentine footballer.
- Sergio Rodríguez, 58, Uruguayan footballer.
- Jussi Saukkonen, 81, Finnish politician.
- Eric Sixsmith, 81, British general.
- Thomas Ward, 78, Scottish Olympic wrestler (1936).

=== 7 ===
- Chester Erskine, 80, American filmmaker.
- Akira Hagiwara, 29, Japanese racing driver, racing crash.
- Leonid Kantorovich, 74, Soviet economist and mathematician, Nobel Prize recipient (1975).
- Cecil King, 65, Irish painter.
- Leslie Lewis, 61, British Olympic sprinter (1948, 1952).
- Donald Gaines Murray, 71, American attorney.
- William Homan Thorpe, 84, British zoologist.
- Beulah Tingley, 92, American social activist.
- Valerie von Martens, 91, German-Austrian actress.
- W. H. Walsh, 72, British philosopher and classicist.
- Michael Warriner, 77, English Olympic rower (1928).

=== 8 ===
- Theodore C. Achilles, 80, American diplomat.
- Alma Vessells John, 79, American nurse and radio personality, stroke.
- Alec Knight, 87, New Zealand cricketer.
- George Kenneth Mallory, 86, American pathologist.
- Robert du Mesnil du Buisson, 90, French archaeologist.
- Pauline Newman, 98, Russian-born American labor activist, stroke.
- Yukiko Okada, 18, Japanese singer, suicide by jumping.
- William Luther Rhodes, 67, American judge.

=== 9 ===
- Andrée Blouin, 64, Central African human rights activist, lymphoma.
- Charles Bosanquet, 82, English academic administrator.
- Bob Casey, 77, American jazz musician.
- Heinz Conrads, 72, Austrian actor.
- Robert C. Fritz, 65–66, American ceramics and glass artist.
- Alfredo Gaona, 74, Mexican Olympic boxer (1928).
- Johnny Hundley, 71, American baseball player.
- Stig Johanson, 66, Swedish actor.
- Dick Kokos, 58, American Major League baseball player.
- Les Pearson, 76, American baseball player.
- Leo Quenneville, 85, Canadian NHL ice hockey player.
- Vergil D. Reed, 88–89, American advertising executive and university professor.
- Karel VI Schwarzenberg, 74, Czechoslovak politician and aristocrat.
- Rezső Wanié, 77, Hungarian Olympic swimmer (1928).

=== 10 ===
- Joseph P. Addabbo, 61, American politician, member of the U.S. House of Representatives (since 1961), bladder cancer.
- Peter M. Busch, 51, United States Marine Corps officer and political candidate, plane crash.
- Eugene E. Campbell, 70, American historian.
- Linda Creed, 37, American songwriter, breast cancer.
- Thomas Durnell, 84, English cricketer.
- Alex Gray, 87, Scottish-born Canadian ice hockey player.
- Eugen Grimminger, 93, German resistance member (White Rose).
- Luther Harvel, 80, American Major League baseball player and manager.
- John Kelley, 78, American ice hockey coach.
- Garnet Lamb, 78, Australian rules footballer.
- Ron Tucker, 64, Australian rules footballer.
- Saul J. Turell, 65, American documentarian.

=== 11 ===
- William A. Caldwell, 79, American journalist.
- Penelope Chetwode, 76, English travel writer.
- Charles Darlington, 81, American diplomat.
- Israel Goldstein, 89, American-Israeli rabbi, founder of Brandeis University.
- Sir Ronald Gould, 81, British trade unionist.
- Ethel Haythornthwaite, 92, English conservationist
- Stanislav Jungwirth, 55, Czechoslovak Olympic runner (1952, 1956).
- Jack Manners, 71, Canadian CFL football player.
- Peter Nchabeleng, 58, South African trade unionist and anti-apartheid activist, internal bleeding.
- Josef Růžička, 61, Czechoslovak Olympic wrestler (1948, 1952).

=== 12 ===
- Neil Adams, 62, Australian rugby player.
- Einar Ágústsson, 63, Icelandic politician.
- Meri Avidzba, 69, Soviet fighter pilot.
- Joseph Dervaes, 79, Belgian racing cyclist.
- José Jabardo, 71, Spanish racing cyclist.
- Valentin Kataev, 89, Soviet writer.
- Sidney Matthew Metzger, 83, American Roman Catholic prelate.
- Dave Nelson, 76, Australian rules footballer.
- François Neuville, 73, Belgian racing cyclist.
- Walter Tille, 79, German trade unionist.
- Jean-François Tournon, 80, French Olympic fencer (1952).
- Bill Welsh, 77, Australian rules footballer.

=== 13 ===
- Bruce F. Allen, 68, American politician, member of the California State Assembly (1953–1963).
- Dorothy Ashby, 53, American jazz musician.
- Sulo Bärlund, 75, Finnish Olympic shot putter (1936).
- Frank DeCicco, 50, American mobster (Gambino crime family), car bomb.
- Johnny Dollar, 53, American country musician.
- Richmond Bowling Keech, 89, American judge.
- Tamás Major, 76, Hungarian actor.
- Stephen Stucker, 38, American actor (Airplane!, The Kentucky Fried Movie), AIDS.
- Andrew Tsu, 100, Chinese Anglican prelate.
- Jack van Bebber, 78, American Olympic gold medalist wrestler (1932).

=== 14 ===
- J. Lindsay Almond, 87, American politician and judge, governor of Virginia (1958–1962), member of the U.S. House of Representatives (1946–1948).
- Simone de Beauvoir, 78, French writer, feminist and philosopher, pneumonia.
- Nitin Bose, 88, Indian filmmaker.
- Jole Bovio Marconi, 89, Italian archaeologist.
- Whitford Brown, 75, New Zealand politician.
- Sidney Cope, 81, English cricketer.
- Arne Halonen, 87, Finnish journalist.
- Torbjørn Kristoffersen, 93, Norwegian Olympic gymnast (1920).
- Doc Land, 82, American Major League baseball player.
- John C. Munn, 79, American soldier officer.
- Daniela Zanetta, 23, Italian human rights activist, epidermolysis bullosa dystrophica.

=== 15 ===
- Sergei Anokhin, 76, Soviet pilot.
- George E. Burch, 76, American cardiologist.
- Redmund Geach, 53, South African cricketer.
- Jean Genet, 75, French novelist and playwright, throat cancer.
- Edmund Hakewill-Smith, 90, British general.
- Don Hoefler, 63, American journalist, coined "Silicon Valley".
- Jiang Zhaohe, 81, Chinese artist.
- Nathan O. Kaplan, 68, American biochemist.
- Paul F. Lorence, 31, American Air Force pilot, killed in battle.
- Robert Marjolin, 74, French economist and politician.
- Tim McIntire, 41, American actor, heart failure.
- John Archibald Mills, 75, Canadian politician.
- Vlastimil Moravec, 36, Czechoslovak Olympic cyclist (1972, 1976), traffic collision.
- Dudley Gwynne Perkins, 75, Welsh radio broadcaster.
- Fernando L. Ribas-Dominicci, 33, American Air Force pilot, killed in battle.
- Edwin R. Thiele, 90, American archaeologist and missionary.

=== 16 ===
- Allan Cunningham Anderson, 89, Scottish-born Canadian diplomat.
- Graham Bagnall, 73, New Zealand librarian and historian.
- Dave Bell, 76, Scottish footballer.
- Carlo Biagi, 71, Italian footballer.
- Mae Capone, 89, American wife of Al Capone.
- Pia Colombo, 51, French singer, cancer.
- Scrapper Farrell, 70, American NFL football player.
- Charles Goldenberg, 75, American NFL football player (Green Bay Packers).
- Alfred Hopkins, 85, British Olympic weightlifter (1928).
- Molly Luce, 89, American painter.
- Bob May, 76, Australian politician.
- Joe Price, 99, Australian rules footballer.
- Dyke Smith, 74, American football player.
- Bob Stam, 67, Dutch footballer.

=== 17 ===
- Ruka Broughton, 45, New Zealand university lecturer and priest.
- Robert R. Casey, 70, American politician, member of the U.S. House of Representatives (1959–1976).
- Stafford Castledine, 74, English cricketer.
- Paul Costello, 91, American Olympic rower (1920, 1924, 1928).
- Marcel Dassault, 94, French aircraft manufacturer.
- Gaston Ducayla, 87, French Olympic wrestler (1924).
- Victor H. Espinoza, 56, American soldier, Medal of Honor recipient.
- Hermann Friedrich Graebe, 85, German engineer.
- George Baillie-Hamilton, 12th Earl of Haddington, 91, Scottish hereditary peer.
- Henry Hall, 93, American ski jumper.
- Bessie Head, 48, South African-Botswanan writer, hepatitis.
- Emma Henry, 38–39, Filipino police officer, shot.
- Viktor Kokochashvili, 81, Soviet Georgian chemist.
- Teddy Kotick, 57, American jazz musician, brain cancer.
- Carl Lee, 59, American actor, AIDS.
- Herb Peschel, 72, Canadian CFL football player.
- Dominique Ponchardier, 69, French writer and diplomat.
- Maria Wardasówna, 78, Polish writer and aviator.

=== 18 ===
- Eddie Bauer, 86, American businessman (Eddie Bauer).
- George Durning, 87, American Major League baseball player.
- Atulya Ghosh, 81, Indian politician.
- John Grady, 62–63, Australian author.
- Hugh Hough, 62, American author.
- Antonio Lauro, 68, Venezuelan musician.
- Heinrich Lehmann-Willenbrock, 74, German submarine commander.
- Sir Victor Raikes, 85, British politician, MP (1931–1957).
- Aleksander Rozmus, 85, Polish Olympic ski jumper (1928).
- Tran Minh Tiet, 63, South Vietnamese politician and judge.

=== 19 ===
- Gudrun Stig Aagaard, 91, Danish textile artist.
- Gordon Abbott, 71, Australian rules footballer.
- George Breitman, 70, American political activist, heart attack.
- Aileen Britton, 70, Australian actress.
- James Carne, 80, British soldier VC recipient.
- Alvin Childress, 78, American actor (Amos 'n' Andy).
- Fred Duncan, 72, Australian politician.
- Arthur T. Gibbons, 83, American politician, member of the Minnesota House of Representatives (1935–1954).
- Adrian Gill, 49, Australian meteorologist and oceanographer, colon cancer.
- Peter Higson, 80, English cricketer.
- Émile Maggi, 78, French Olympic racewalker (1948, 1952).
- William S. Thomas, 84, American Episcopalian prelate.
- Dag Wirén, 80, Swedish composer.
- Estelle Yancey, 90, American blues singer.

=== 20 ===
- Aleksei Arbuzov, 77, Soviet playwright.
- Max Benedict, 66, Austrian-born English film editor.
- Doris Dawson, 81, American actress.
- Jean De Rode, 72, Belgian Olympic rower (1936).
- Eddie Feinberg, 68, American Major League baseball player.
- Jean-Jacques Gautier, 77, French writer.
- Sibte Hassan, 69, Pakistani political activist.
- Bun LaPrairie, 74, American NHL ice hockey player.
- Milton Mayer, 77, American journalist.
- Edward McNair, 72, American Episcopal prelate.
- Marie Nyswander, 67, American psychoanalyst, cancer.
- Alif Piriyev, 64, Soviet Azerbaijani soldier.

=== 21 ===
- Teodoro Casana Robles, 86, Peruvian lawyer, archaeologist and geographer.
- George Collingwood, 82, British general.
- Marjorie Eaton, 85, American actress and painter.
- Nanna Egedius, 72, Norwegian Olympic figure skater (1936).
- Tiny Gooch, 82, American football player and political activist.
- Salah Jahin, 55, Egyptian poet, playwright and political cartoonist.
- Jozef Kalina, 61, Czechoslovak Olympic basketball player (1948).
- Matsunobori Shigeo, 61, Japanese sumo wrestler.

=== 22 ===
- Salvador Agron, 42, American gangster, internal bleeding.
- Mircea Eliade, 79, Romanian-born American writer and historian.
- Dame Honor Fell, 85, British cell biologist.
- Cliff Finch, 59, American politician, governor of Mississippi (1976–1980), heart attack.
- Claude Fortier, 64, Canadian physiologist.
- David Funchess, 39, American convicted murderer, execution by electric chair.
- Go Se-tae, 60–61, South Korean Olympic basketball player (1956).
- Kaino Haapanen, 74, Finnish politician.
- Errol Laughlin, 38, South African cricketer.
- Dick Moores, 76, American cartoonist (Gasoline Alley).
- William P. Murphy, 87, American judge.
- Bogoljub Nedeljković, 65–66, Yugoslav politician.
- Robert Smock, 77, American horticulturist.

=== 23 ===
- Harold Arlen, 81, American composer ("Over the Rainbow", "The Man That Got Away", "Ac-Cent-Tchu-Ate the Positive"), cancer.
- George H. Barker, 84–85, American football player.
- Louis Cardwell, 73, English footballer.
- Manuel Figueroa, 81, Chilean footballer.
- Yuri Gulyayev, 55, Soviet singer, heart failure.
- John W. F. M. Huffer, 90, American fighter pilot.
- Sir Charles Johnston, 74, British diplomat.
- Jim Laker, 64, English cricketer, complications from gallbladder surgery.
- Doxie Moore, 75, American basketball player and NBL coach.
- Otto Preminger, 80, Austrian-American filmmaker (Anatomy of a Murder, Exodus, Laura), lung cancer.
- Arnold Rørholt, 77, Norwegian jurist.
- Harald Nicolai Samuelsberg, 74, Norwegian politician.
- Harold E. Wagoner, 81, American architect.
- Alberto Zorrilla, 80, Argentine Olympic swimmer (1924, 1928).

=== 24 ===
- Vic Baltzell, 73, American NFL football player.
- Bert Blake, 78, English footballer.
- Antun Bonifačić, 84, Croatian-American politician and writer.
- Gladys Colton, 76–77, English educationist.
- Max Dennis, 60, American politician, member of the Ohio Senate (1965–1976).
- Ivan Duichev, 78, Bulgarian historian and paleographer.
- Bill Edrich, 70, British cricketer.
- Gerardo Guerrieri, 66, Italian filmmaker.
- Norm Hillard, 70, Australian rules footballer.
- Haldur Lasthein, 80, Danish footballer.
- Garnet Mackley, 102, New Zealand politician and railway manager, MP (1943–1949).
- Dimitar Paskov, 71, Bulgarian chemist.
- Wallis Simpson, 89, American-British socialite, widow of Edward VIII, pneumonia.
- Bernice McIlhenny Wintersteen, 82, American art patron.

=== 25 ===
- Michael Creswell, 76, British diplomat.
- Tite Figueroa, 59, Puerto Rican baseball player.
- Fred Hunt, 62, English pianist.
- DeWitt Hyde, 77, American politician, member of the U.S. House of Representatives (1953–1959).
- Urylee Leonardos, 75, American actress and singer.

=== 26 ===
- Ángel Blanco, 47, Mexican professional wrestler, traffic collision.
- Nellie Breen, 89, American dancer and comedian.
- Broderick Crawford, 74, American actor (All the King's Men, Highway Patrol), stroke.
- Hermann Gmeiner, 66, Austrian philanthropist.
- Kemal Gülçelik, 62–63, Turkish footballer.
- Leo Hofstee, 82, Dutch-born American Roman Catholic priest.
- Valery Khodemchuk, 35, Soviet Ukrainian engineer, reactor explosion.
- Johnny Kitzmiller, 81, American NFL football player.
- Cliff Leeman, 72, American jazz drummer.
- Bessie Love, 87, American-British actress.
- Séamus McElwain, 26, Irish militant (Provisional Irish Republican Army), shot.
- O. Leslie Stone, 82, American Mormon leader.
- Dechko Uzunov, 87, Bulgarian painter.
- Lou van Burg, 68, Dutch-German television personality and singer.

=== 27 ===
- Frederick Dawson, 68, New Zealand cricketer.
- Tim Greve, 60, Norwegian historian, cancer.
- Ed Halicki, 80, American NFL football player.
- J. Allen Hynek, 75, American ufologist, creator of the close encounter scale, brain cancer.
- Eduard Imhof, 91, Swiss cartographer.
- Marty Karow, 81, American Major League baseball player.
- Åke Kromnow, 71, Swedish historian.
- Verena Loewensberg, 73, Swiss painter.
- Lolita, 36, Italian singer, stabbed.
- Evi Maltagliati, 77, Italian actress.
- Tom McLachlan, 79, Australian rugby league footballer.
- William Morrell, 86, New Zealand historian.
- Bayless Rose, 95, American musician.
- Juan Tapia Sánchez, 71, Spanish politician, cancer.

=== 28 ===
- R. H. Bing, 71, American mathematician.
- Geoff Brokenshire, 63, Australian rules footballer.
- Louis H. Burke, 81, American judge.
- Marcel Hellman, 87, Romanian-born British film producer.
- Rabiul Awal Kiran Khan, 45–46, Bangladeshi politician, shot.
- Fred Lutkefedder, 76, American soccer player.
- Evan Mackie, 68, New Zealand flying ace, cancer.
- Dave McClain, 48, American football player and coach, cardiac arrest.
- Vladimír Novák, 82, Czechoslovak Olympic skier (1928, 1932, 1936).
- Ramu III, appr. 23, American orca, cardiovascular failure.
- Pat Seerey, 63, American Major League baseball player.
- Charles B. Washington, 62, American civil rights activist.

=== 29 ===
- Gilbert Baker, 75, Hong Kong Anglican prelate.
- Sidney Bowman, 78, American Olympic jumper (1928, 1932).
- Henri de France, 74, French television engineer.
- Alejandro González Malavé, 28, Puerto Rican undercover agent, shot.
- Edwin Graves, 88, American Olympic rower (1920).
- Vickie Panos, 66, Canadian baseball player.
- Dick Powell, 81, American NFL football player.
- Raúl Prebisch, 85, Argentine economist.
- Thomas N. Scortia, 59, American author, leukemia.
- Glen Byam Shaw, 81, English actor and theatre director.
- Bernhard Wosien, 77, German choreographer.

=== 30 ===
- Sheila Borrett, 80, British radio presenter, stroke.
- Antoinette Butte, 87, French scouting leader.
- Jørgen Hansen, 54, Danish Olympic footballer (1960).
- Bill Higdon, 62, American Major League baseball player.
- Henry Kemp-Blair, 56, South African-American playwright and theatre director, heart attack.
- Odd Solumsmoen, 68, Norwegian novelist.
- Thelma Stefani, 37, Argentine actress and dancer, suicide by jumping.
- Robert Stevenson, 81, British-American filmmaker (Mary Poppins, Bedknobs and Broomsticks, The Love Bug).
- George Whitcombe, 84, Welsh footballer.

== Sources ==
- Liebman, Roy (2000). The Wampas Baby Stars: A Biographical Dictionary, 1922–1934. Jefferson, North Carolina: McFarland. ISBN 0-7864-0756-5.
