= Camacho =

Camacho is a surname of Spanish and Portuguese origin, derived from a nickname. Notable people with the surname include:

- Tanga Loa (born 1983), Tongan-American professional wrestler who wrestled as Camacho in WWE
- Alejandro Camacho (born 1954), Mexican actor and producer
- Alicia Sánchez-Camacho (born 1967), Spanish politician
- Antonio Camacho García (1926–2017), Spanish politician
- Ariel Camacho (1992–2015), Mexican singer-songwriter
- Art Camacho, American film director, producer, actor and stuntman
- Bruno Camacho (born 1985), Brazilian football (soccer) player
- Byron Camacho (born 1988), Ecuadorian footballer
- Carla Camacho (born 2005), Spanish footballer
- Carlos Camacho (1924–1979), Guamanian politician
- Carlos S. Camacho (born 1937), Northern Mariana Islands politician
- Carme Camacho (born 1990), Spanish translator, writer and English-language teacher
- Carmen Camacho (singer) (born 1939), Filipina singer
- Carmen Camacho (writer) (born 1976), Spanish writer
- César Camacho (born 1943), Peruvian-born Brazilian mathematician
- César Camacho Quiroz (born 1959), Mexican lawyer and politician
- Christian Camacho (born 1988), American football (soccer) player
- Crescencio Camacho (1918–2014), Colombian singer and songwriter
- Daniel Camacho (born 1998), Bolivian football (soccer) player
- Diego Camacho y Ávila (1652–1712), Spanish archbishop
- Diego Camacho (footballer) (born 1976), Spanish football (soccer) player
- Diego Camacho (tennis) (born 1983), Bolivian tennis player
- Eliodoro Camacho (1831–1899), Bolivian politician
- Erika Tatiana Camacho (born 1974), Mexican mathematician and academic
- Ernie Camacho (born 1955), American baseball player
- Felix Camacho (disambiguation), several people
- Fidelia Brindis Camacho (1889–1972), Mexican teacher, journalist, women's rights activist and politician
- Filemón Camacho (1926–2012), Venezuelan middle-distance runner
- Francisco de Oliveira Camacho Júnior (1784–1862), Brazilian politician and landowner
- Frank Camacho (born 1988), Guamanian mixed martial artist
- Genaro Ruiz Camacho (1954–1998), American drug dealer and organized crime leader
- Gianna Camacho (born 1987), Peruvian journalist and activist
- Gregorio Camacho (1933–2002), Venezuelan painter
- Gonzalo Camacho (born 1984), Argentine rugby player
- Guilherme Camacho (born 1990), Brazilian football (soccer) player
- Héctor Camacho ("Macho" Camacho) (1962–2012), Puerto Rican boxer
- Héctor Camacho Jr. (born 1978), Puerto Rican boxer, son of Héctor Camacho
- Ignacio Camacho (born 1990), Spanish football (soccer) player
- Jasmine Camacho-Quinn (born 1996), Puerto Rican track and field athlete
- Javier Camacho (born 1964), Mexican boxer
- Jesse Camacho (born 1991), Canadian actor, son of Mark Camacho
- Jessica Camacho (born 1982), American actress
- Jesús Camacho (born 1998), Mexican squash player
- Jim Camacho, American singer/songwriter
- João Camacho (born 1994), Portuguese football (soccer) player
- Joaquín Camacho (1766–1816), Neogranadine (Colombian) politician
- Joe Camacho (born 1968/1969), Northern Mariana Islands judge, lawyer, and politician
- Joe Camacho (baseball) (1928–2018), American baseball player and coach
- Jonathan Javier Camacho Riera (born 1985), Venezuelan swimmer
- Jorge Camacho (painter) (1934–2011), Cuban realist painter
- Jorge Camacho (writer) (born 1966), Spanish writer in Esperanto and Spanish
- José Camacho (judoka) (born 1983), Venezuelan judoka
- Jose Camacho-Collados (born 1988), Spanish chess player
- José Antonio Camacho (born 1955), Spanish football (soccer) player and manager
- José António Camacho (1946–2025), Portuguese politician
- Jose Isidro Camacho (born 1955), Filipino banker and politician
- Josué Camacho (born 1969), Puerto Rican boxer
- Juan Camacho (Mexican athlete) (born 1972), Mexican long-distance runner
- Juan Camacho (Bolivian athlete) (born 1959), Bolivian long-distance runner
- Juan Antonio Camacho de Saavedra (1669–1740), master architect of Córdoba, Spain
- Juan Francisco Camacho (1824–1896), Spanish statesman and financier
- Juanjo Camacho (born 1980), Spanish football (soccer) player
- Julian Camacho (born 1943), Filipino sports official
- Julio Camacho Aguilera (1924–2024), Cuban military officer and politician
- Julio César Camacho (born 1978), Venezuelan luger
- Kote Camacho (born 1980), Basque filmmaker, animator and comic artist
- Leevin Camacho, Guamanian lawyer and attorney general
- Leonardo Camacho (born 1957), Bolivian wrestler
- Lidia Camacho, Mexican academic and public official
- Luis Camacho (footballer) (born 1983), Mexican football (soccer) player and manager
- Luis Camacho (dancer), American dancer, choreographer and recording artist
- Luis Fernando Camacho (born 1979), Bolivian activist and politician
- Manuel Ávila Camacho, President of Mexico 1940–1946
- Manuel Camacho (footballer) (1929–2008), Mexican football (soccer) player
- Manuel Camacho Solís (1946–2015), Mexican politician
- Marcelino Camacho (1918–2010), Spanish trade union leader and politician
- Marcelo Ramiro Camacho (born 1980), Brazilian football (soccer) player
- Mario Camacho (born 1983), Costa Rican football (soccer) player
- Marita Camacho Quirós (1911–2025), First Lady of Costa Rica and a supercentenarian
- Mark Camacho (born 1964), Canadian actor, voice actor and voice director
- Michael Camacho (born 1953), West Indian cricketer
- Nemesio Camacho (1869–1929), Colombian businessman and politician
- Nerea Camacho (born 1996), Spanish actress
- Néstor Camacho (born 1987), Paraguayan football (soccer) player
- Nicol Camacho (born 1999), Colombian football (soccer) player
- Pablo Camacho (born 1990), Venezuelan football (soccer) player
- Paulo Camacho (born 1970), Portuguese swimmer
- Pedro Camacho, Portuguese musical composer
- Pedro Camacho (athlete) (born 1938), Puerto Rican triple jumper
- Rafael Camacho (born 2000), Portuguese football (soccer) player
- Rafael Camacho Guzmán (1916–1998), Mexican trade union leader and politician
- Richard Camacho, Dominican singer-songwriter and dancer
- Rodolfo Camacho (1975–2016), Colombian road cyclist
- Rubén Camacho (1953–2015), Mexican road cyclist
- Rudy Camacho (born 1991), French football (soccer) player
- Salvador Camacho (1827–1900), Colombian economist and politician
- Santiago Camacho (born 1997), Argentine football (soccer) player
- Sidronio Camacho, Mexican revolutionary soldier
- Steve Camacho, British West Indian cricketer
- Thelma Camacho, American opera and rock and roll singer
- Vicente Camacho (1929–2016), Northern Mariana Islands politician
- Vicente Castro Camacho, Northern Mariana Islands politician
- Vicente Camacho y Moya (1886–1943), Mexican Catholic bishop
- Wadi Camacho (born 1985), Spanish-born British boxer
- Washington Camacho (born 1986), Uruguayan football (soccer) player

== In fiction ==
- Camacho, a character in Don Quixote
- President Dwayne Elizondo Mountain Dew Herbert Camacho, a fictional character from the 2006 comedy film Idiocracy
- Lalo Camacho, a fictional character in Third and Indiana

== See also ==
- Camacho, Minas Gerais, a Brazilian municipality
- Camacho (album), the seventh studio album by Pete Murray (Australian singer-songwriter), 2017.
- Camacho River, Bolivia
- Camacho Cigars, a Honduran cigar company
- Eliodoro Camacho Province in Bolivia, named after the politician
