= Henry Kemp =

Henry Kemp may refer to:

- Henry Kemp of Thomastoun (fl. 1526–1554), Scottish courtier to King James V
- Henry Tacy Kemp (1821–1901), New Zealand translator and civil servant
- Henry Kemp (politician) (1912–1973), Australian politician.
- Henry Kemp-Blair (1930–1986), South African playwright
