= Halicki =

Halicki (masculine), Halicka (feminine) is a Polish toponymic surname literally meaning "someone from Halych. Notable people with the surname include:

- Alice Halicka, Polish-born French painter
- Andrzej Halicki
- Beata Halicka Polish historian and philologist
- Ed Halicki
- Ed Halicki (American football)
- H. B. Halicki
- Tomasz Halicki

== See also ==
- Halecki
