= Grimminger =

Grimminger is a German surname. Notable people with the surname include:

- Jakob Grimminger (1892–1969), German SS officer
- Johannes Grimminger (1914–1945), German military officer
- Eugen Grimminger (1892–1986), member of the White Rose resistance group in Nazi Germany

== See also ==
- Mount Grimminger, mountain of Antarctica
