= Crailsheim =

- Town
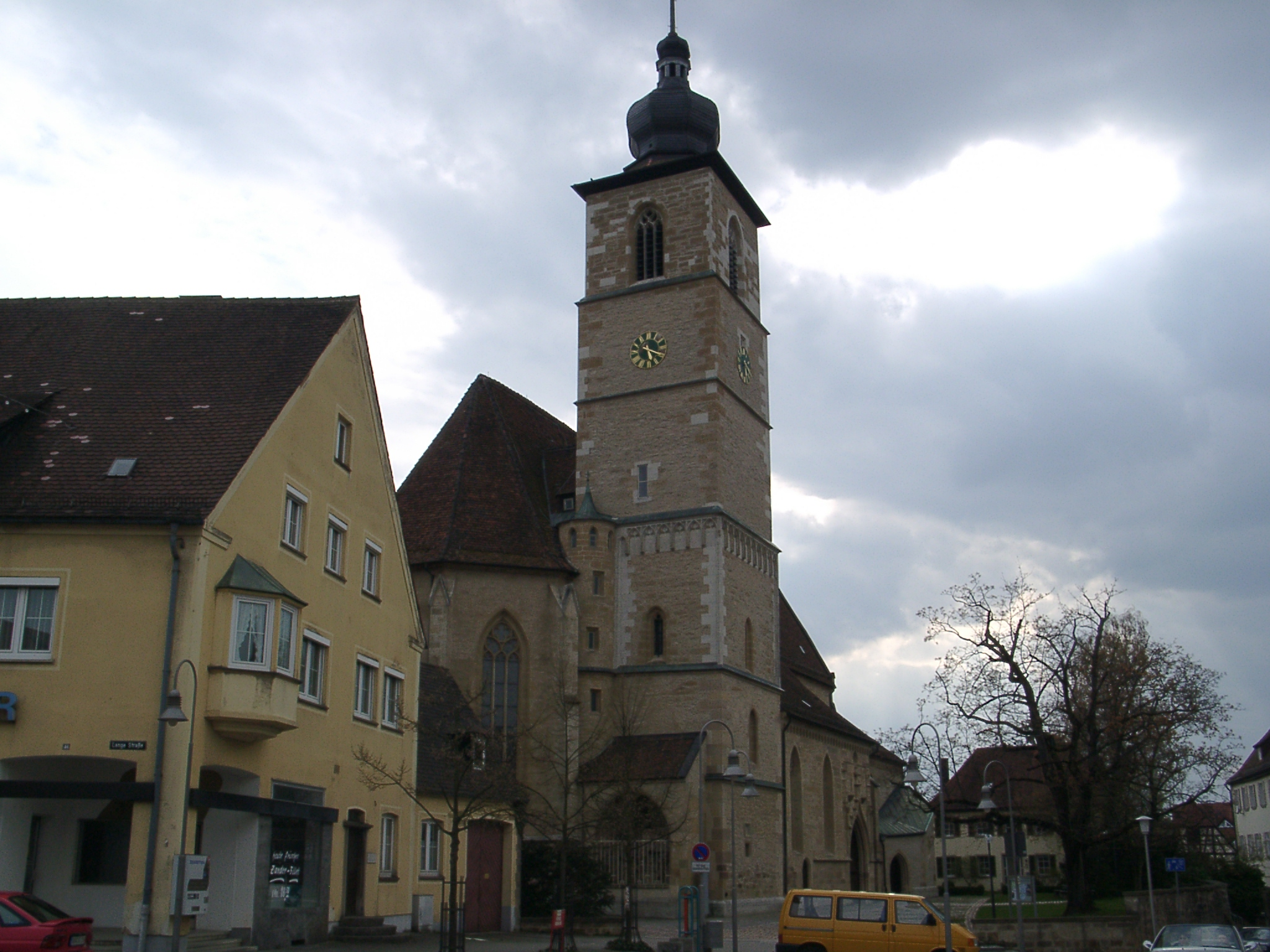
- The Johanneskirche, built between 1398 and 1440, is one of the oldest buildings in Crailsheim.

- Coat of arms

- Location of Crailsheim within Schwäbisch Hall district
- Interactive map of Crailsheim
- Location within Germany Location within Baden-Württemberg
- Coordinates: 49°08′05″N 10°04′14″E
- Country: Germany
- State: Baden-Württemberg
- Admin. region: Stuttgart
- District: Schwäbisch Hall
- Subdivisions: Core city and 8 districts

Government
  - Mayor (2017–25): Christoph Grimmer (Ind.)

Area
  - Total: 109.08 km^{2} (42.12 sq mi)
- Elevation: 414 m (1,358 ft)

Population (2025-12-31)
  - Total: 35,905
  - Density: 329.16/km^{2} (852.53/sq mi)
- Time zone: UTC+01:00 (CET)
  - Summer (DST): UTC+02:00 (CEST)
- Postal codes: 74564
- Dialling codes: 07951
- Vehicle registration: SHA / CR
- Website: crailsheim.de

Crailsheim (German pronunciation: [ˈkʁaɪlsˌhaɪm]) is a town in the German state of Baden-Württemberg. Incorporated in 1338, it lies 32 kilometres (20 miles) east of Schwäbisch Hall and 40 km (25 mi) southwest of Ansbach in the Schwäbisch Hall district. The city's main attractions include two Evangelical churches, a Catholic church, and the 67 metre tower of its town hall.

== History ==
Crailsheim is famed for withstanding a siege by forces of three imperial cities - Schwäbisch Hall, Dinkelsbühl, and Rothenburg ob der Tauber - lasting from 1379 until 1380, a feat which it celebrates annually. Crailsheim became a possession of the Burgrave of Nuremberg following the siege. In 1791 it became part of the Prussian administrative region, before returning to Bavaria in 1806 and becoming a part of Württemberg in 1810.

Crailsheim's railroad and airfield were heavily defended by the Waffen-SS during World War II. Following an American assault in mid-April 1945, the town was occupied briefly by US forces before being lost to a German counter-offensive. Intense US bombing and artillery shelling destroyed much of the city, with subsequent fires consuming its historic inner city. Only the Johanneskirche (St. John's Church) escaped unharmed.

Crailsheim became the postwar home to the U.S. Army's McKee Barracks until the facility closed in January 1994.

Major employers in the Crailsheim area include:

- Voith
- Syntegon Technology GmbH
- Gerhard Schubert GmbH

The following boroughs comprise the Crailsheim municipality: Altenmünster, Erkenbrechtshausen, Tiefenbach, Onolzheim, Roßfeld, Jagstheim, Westgartshausen, Goldbach, Triensbach and Beuerlbach.

== Transportation ==
Crailsheim is served by the Upper Jagst Railway.

== Twin towns – sister cities ==
Crailsheim is twinned with:

- Biłgoraj, Poland
- Jurbarkas, Lithuania
- Pamiers, France
- Worthington, United States

== Crailsheim Merlins ==
The Crailsheim Merlins are the city's basketball team. Founded in 1986, they originally played in lower leagues. In 1995 they moved into a new sports hall, improved, and were promoted in 2001 to the 2. Bundesliga, the second division of German basketball. In 2015 they were first promoted to the Bundesliga but relegated after two seasons. They achieved promotion again in 2018. www.crailsheim-merlins.de

== Notable people ==
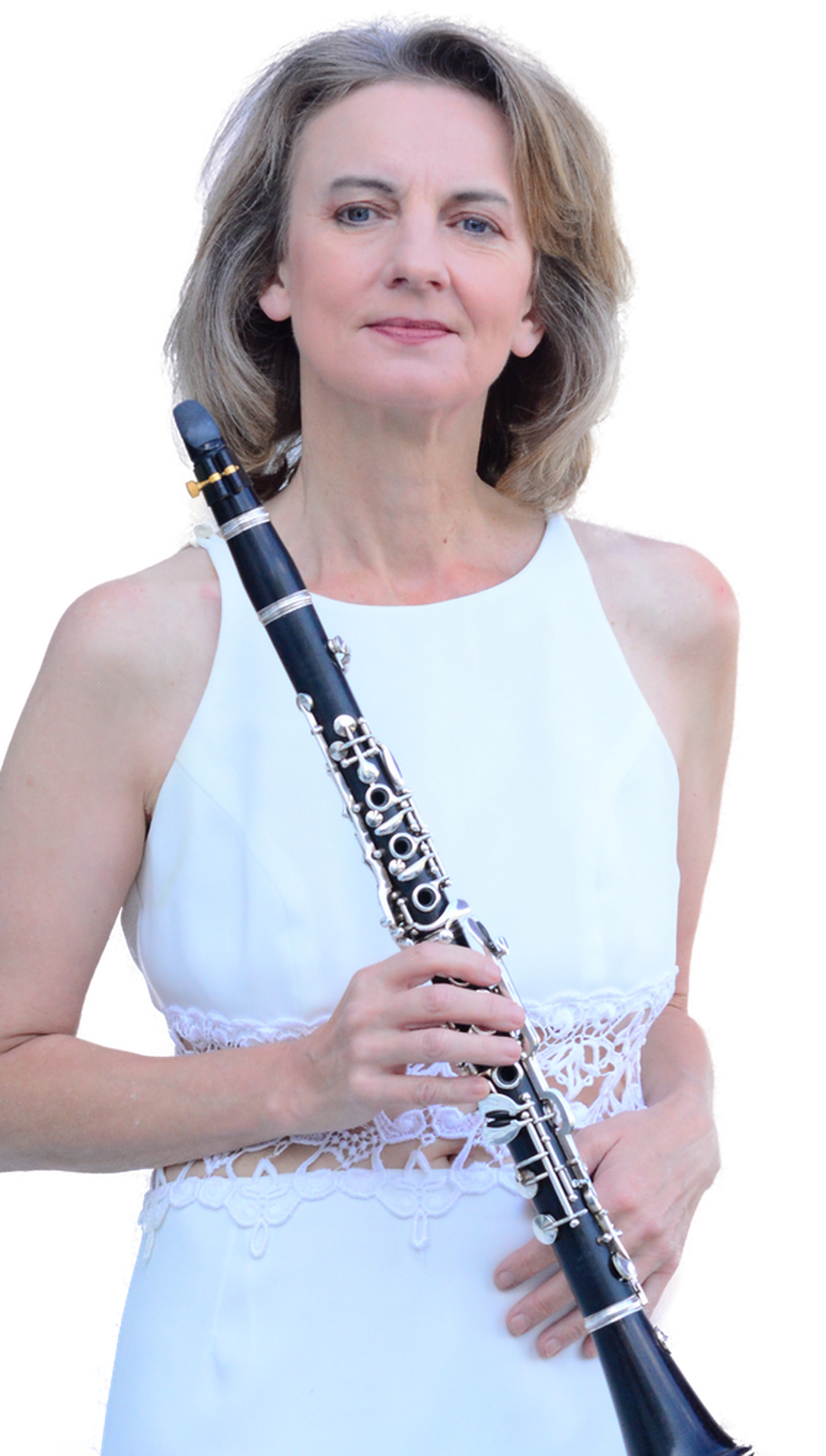
Sabine Meyer, 2020

- Hans Krell (ca. 1490–1565 or 1586), portrait painter of the Renaissance.
- Kurt Schneider (1887–1967), psychiatrist, worked on the understanding of schizophrenia
- Eugen Grimminger (1892–1986), Member of White Rose resistance group in Nazi Germany.
- Inge Aicher-Scholl (1917–1998), author and core member of the White Rose resistance movement
- Hans Scholl (1918–1943), founding member of the White Rose resistance movement in Nazi Germany
- Eva Schorr (1927–2016), painter and composer
- Wolfgang Meyer (1954–2019), clarinetist
- Sabine Meyer (born 1959), clarinetist
- Philipp, Prince of Hohenlohe-Langenburg (born 1970), 10th Prince of Hohenlohe-Langenburg
- Ralf Kettemann (born 1986), head coach of German Bundesliga football club SC Paderborn 07
