= Eva Schorr =

German painter and composer

- Born: Eva Weiler; 28 September 1927; Crailsheim, Germany
- Died: 20 January 2016 (aged 88); Stuttgart, Germany
- Known for: Painting, Musical composition
- Spouse: Dieter Schorr

Eva Schorr (28 September 1927 – 20 January 2016) was a German painter and composer.

== Biography ==
Eva Weiler was born in Crailsheim, Württemberg. Her father was a music and art teacher and gave her lessons in both. At the age of eight she began composing, and at the age of 15 won prizes for composition and organ. She studied music in Stuttgart with Johann Nepomuk David and Anton Nowakowski. She also studied with Olivier Messiaen in Darmstadt.

She married Dieter Schorr, music editor of the Stuttgarter Nachrichten and had two sons and a daughter. She died at the age of 88 in 2016.

== Honors and awards ==
- 1961 GEDOK Prize
- Prize Composition Competition in Mannheim
- Prizes for 4 International Competitions in Buenos Aires

== Works ==
Schorr has composed chamber music, orchestral works, choral works and music for the stage and film.

- Septuarchie violin concerto
- Ritornell (Meditation) for violin and organ
- Pas de Trois
- In der Welt ihr Angst Habte, cantata with violin and organ
- Fantasie, Choral und Fuge for organ and oboe
- Wir sind ein Teil der Erde choral
- Kyrie choral
- Psalm 98 for organ

Her work has been recorded and issued on CD including:

- Initialen F-G-H-SKammerensemble Niggemann, Hans-Ulrich Niggemann (soprano flute), Friedrich Milde (oboe), Grete Niggemann (viol), Siegfried Petrenz (harpsichord) (1977) Mitschnitt SDR
