= Juan Tapia Sánchez =

Spanish politician (1914–1986)

Juan Tapia Sánchez (22 June 1914 – 27 April 1986) was a Spanish Socialist Workers' Party (PSOE) politician in Granada who served as mayor by legal requirement on 15 November 1979.

Born in Almería, Tapia Sánchez joined the Unión General de Trabajadores (UGT) trade union and the PSOE in 1931. He was first elected to Granada City Council during the Second Spanish Republic in the 1930s.

In 1972, when the PSOE split, Tapia Sánchez joined the PSOE(h) (historical sector), which later became the Socialist Action Party (PASOC). In 1977, he joined the mainstream faction. He was also a member of Catholic Action, and met new recruits for his party via this activism.

Tapia Sánchez became mayor by the word of the law on 15 November 1979, when Antonio Camacho García resigned only six months after the first democratic local elections. He resigned five minutes later, declining the office due to his age, and Antonio Jara Andréu became mayor for the next 12 years.

Tapia Sánchez died of cancer at the age of 71. The following day, he was given Granada's Gold Medal from the city council.
