= Leopold Tajner =

Polish skier

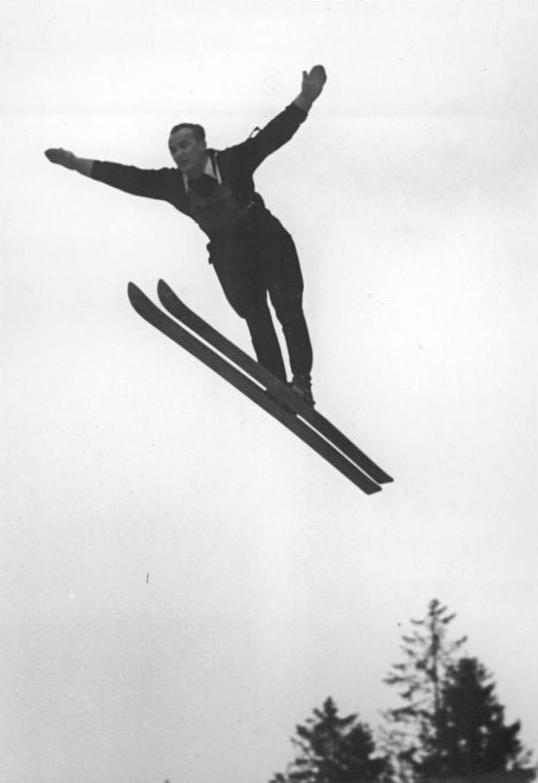
Leopold Tajner jumping during the East-German Championships in 1951

Leopold Tajner (May 15, 1921 – February 25, 1993) was a Polish cross-country skier and ski jumper who competed in the 1940s and 1950s.

He was born in Roztropice and died in Wisła.

At the 1948 Winter Olympics he finished 76th in the 18 km cross-country skiing event.

He finished 39th in the individual large hill at the 1952 Winter Olympics in Oslo.
