= Roztropice =

- Village
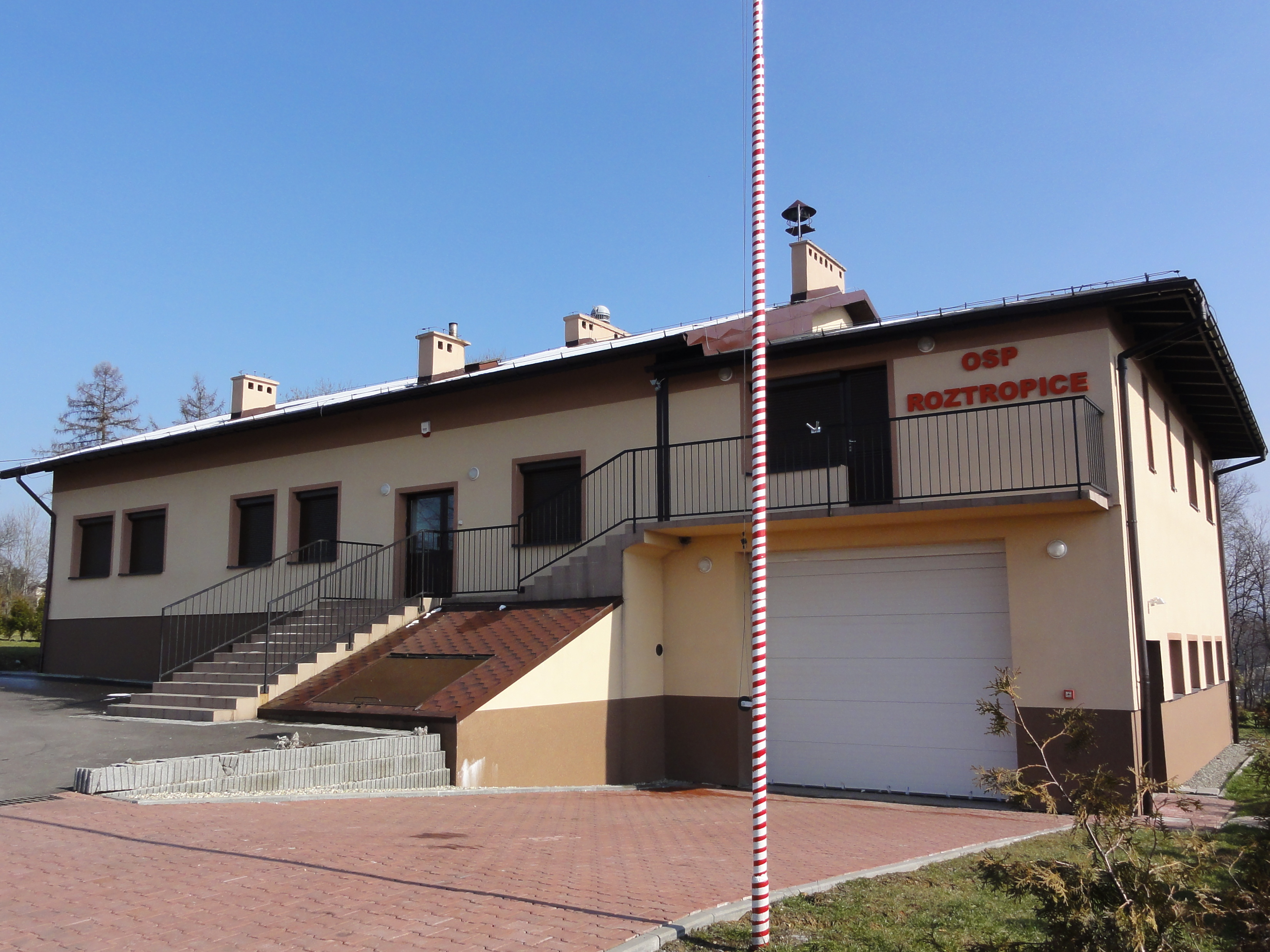
- Fire station

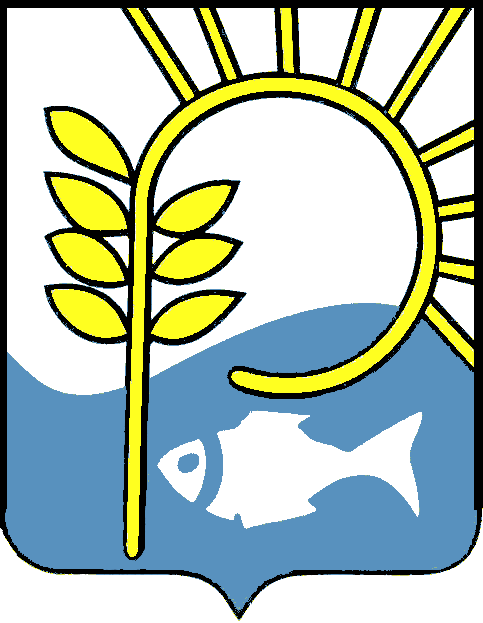
- Coat of arms

- Location within Poland
- Coordinates: 49°50′19.56″N 18°51′30″E
- Country: Poland
- Voivodeship: Silesian
- County: Bielsko
- Gmina: Jasienica
- First mentioned: 1305

Government
  - Mayor: Barbara Sadlik

Area
  - Total: 5.761 km^{2} (2.224 sq mi)

Population (2016)
  - Total: 755
  - Density: 131/km^{2} (339/sq mi)
- Time zone: UTC+1 (CET)
  - Summer (DST): UTC+2 (CEST)
- Car plates: SBI

Roztropice [rɔstrɔˈpit͡sɛ] is a village in Gmina Jasienica, Bielsko County, Silesian Voivodeship, southern Poland. It lies in the Silesian Foothills and in the historical region of Cieszyn Silesia.

== History ==
The village was first mentioned in a Latin document of Diocese of Wrocław called Liber fundationis episcopatus Vratislaviensis from around 1305 as item in Rostropitz. It meant that the village was in the process of location (the size of land to pay a tithe from was not yet precised). The creation of the village was a part of a larger settlement campaign taking place in the late 13th century on the territory of what will be later known as Upper Silesia.

Politically the village belonged initially to the Duchy of Teschen, formed in 1290 in the process of feudal fragmentation of Poland and was ruled by a local branch of Piast dynasty. In 1327 the duchy became a fee of Kingdom of Bohemia, which after 1526 became part of the Habsburg monarchy.

After Revolutions of 1848 in the Austrian Empire a modern municipal division was introduced in the re-established Austrian Silesia. The village as a municipality was subscribed to the political district of Bielsko and the legal district of Skoczów. According to the censuses conducted in 1880, 1890, 1900 and 1910 the population of the municipality dropped from 474 in 1880 to 441 in 1910 with a majority being native Polish-speakers (97.3%-98.7%) and a small German-speaking minority (most 12 or 2.5% in 1880), in terms of religion majority were Roman Catholics (77.2% in 1910), followed by Protestants (22.2% in 1910) and Jews (3 people). The village was also traditionally inhabited by Cieszyn Vlachs, speaking Cieszyn Silesian dialect.

After World War I, fall of Austria-Hungary, Polish–Czechoslovak War and the division of Cieszyn Silesia in 1920, it became a part of Poland. It was then annexed by Nazi Germany at the beginning of World War II. After the war it was restored to Poland.

== Notable people ==
- Leopold Tajner, Polish cross-country skier and ski jumper
- Maria Wardasówna, Polish writer and aviator
