= Garnet Lamb =

Australian rules footballer, born 1908

Personal information
- Full name: James Garnet Lamb
- Born: 23 January 1908; Foster, Victoria
- Died: 10 April 1986 (aged 78); Armadale, Victoria
- Original team: Newtown

Playing career^{1}
Years	Club	Games (Goals)
1928–29	Geelong	9 (0)
- ^{1} Playing statistics correct to the end of 1929.

James Garnet Lamb (23 January 1908 – 10 April 1986) was an Australian rules footballer who played with Geelong in the Victorian Football League (VFL).
