= Redmund Geach =

South African cricketer (1933–1986)

Personal information
- Born: 12 April 1933; Bloemfontein, South Africa
- Died: 15 April 1986 (aged 53); Johannesburg, South Africa
- Source: Cricinfo, 6 December 2020

Redmund Geach (12 April 1933 – 15 April 1986) was a South African cricketer. He played in forty first-class matches from 1953/54 to 1961/62.
