= Joe Price (footballer) =

Australian rules footballer

Personal information
- Full name: Joseph Allister Price
- Born: 4 July 1886; Traralgon, Victoria
- Died: 16 April 1986 (aged 99); Dandenong, Victoria
- Original team: Trafalgar

Playing career^{1}
Years	Club	Games (Goals)
1911	Richmond	7 (2)
- ^{1} Playing statistics correct to the end of 1911.

Joseph Allister Price (4 July 1886 – 16 April 1986) was an Australian rules footballer who played with Richmond in the Victorian Football League (VFL).
