= Vergil D. Reed =

American academic

Vergil D. Reed (1897 – April 9, 1986) was an American advertising executive and academic.

Reed was raised in Delaware County, Indiana, and graduated from Indiana University in 1922. Reed then completed a master's degree and doctorate from Columbia Business School. He worked for the J. Walter Thompson Company from 1944 to 1958. Reed taught at Michigan State University and Boston University. In 1941, Reed was elected a fellow of the American Statistical Association. From 1962 to 1965, Reed was a member of the Columbia Graduate Business School of Business. He retired from academia and consultancy work in 1965. Reed died on April 9, 1986, of pneumonia in Washington, D.C.
