= Antonio Camacho García =

Spanish politician

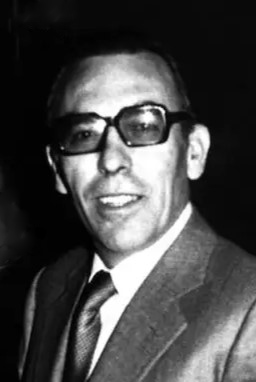

Mayor of Granada
- In office 19 April 1979 – October 1979
- Preceded by: Antonio Morales Souvirón
- Succeeded by: Juan Tapia Sánchez

Personal details
- Born: 26 September 1926 Mengíbar, Andalusia, Spain
- Died: 25 December 2017 (aged 91) Granada, Andalusia, Spain
- Party: PSOE
- Occupation: Politician

Antonio Camacho García (26 September 1926 – 25 December 2017) was a Spanish politician who served as the mayor of Granada in 1979. Camacho became Granada's first mayor following the Spanish transition to democracy and the 1979 local election, the first since the end of Francoist Spain.

Camacho was born in 1926 in Mengíbar, Province of Jaén.

Camacho, and his Spanish Socialist Workers' Party (PSOE), came to power in Granada due to an agreement between the PSOE, the Partido Socialista de Andalucía (PSA), and the Conservative Party (PC) following the 1979 Spanish local elections. Under the terms of the agreement, the three parties divided control of the eight Andalusian provincial capital cities. PSOE and PSA decided to exchange control of two of Andalusia's largest cities: Granada and Sevilla. The PSOE, under Camacho, was granted control of Granada, even though the opposition Union of the Democratic Centre (UCD) had won the most votes in Granada's municipal election. In exchange for Granada, the Partido Socialista de Andalucía (PSA) (now known as the Andalusian Party) was given control of Sevilla's city government.

Antonio Camacho García took office as Granada's new mayor on 19 April 1979, becoming the city's first mayor following the 1979 democratic elections. However, his tenure as mayor lasted only six months due to infighting within the PSOE. He stepped down as mayor in October 1979, citing personal reasons. He was succeeded by PSOE member Juan Tapia Sánchez.

Antonio Camacho García died on 25 December 2017 at the age of 90. He was buried in the San José municipal cemetery.
