= Bob Stam =

Dutch footballer

Personal information
- Date of birth: 6 August 1918
- Date of death: 16 April 1986 (aged 67)

International career
Years	Team	Apps	(Gls)
1939–1940	Netherlands	4	(0)

Bob Stam (6 August 1918 – 16 April 1986) was a Dutch footballer. He played in four matches for the Netherlands national football team from 1939 to 1940.
