= Carme Camacho =

- Born: 15 August 1990 (age 35); Amposta (Catalonia)
- Occupations: Translator, writer, English teacher

Carme Camacho Pérez is a translator, writer and English-language teacher. Born in Amposta (Catalonia) in 1990, she has translated various plays, novels and works of non-fiction into Catalan. She has worked with important theatre companies in London and Catalonia such as Parking Shakespeare, Les Mirones, Cactus Love Produccions, and Bots & Barrals.

== Studies ==
Carme studied Translation and Interpretation at the Autonomous University of Barcelona. Following her graduation in 2012, she moved to London in January 2013 to work and continue studying. She stayed there until the end of 2014 and completed a master's degree in Accessibility, Cinematography and Audiovisual Translations at Roehampton University. She also studied stage writing with Duncan Macmillan at Soho Theatre.

Before moving to London, Carme worked on the Catalan translation of two English-language plays - What we did to Weinstein by Ryan Craig, and The Winslow Boy by Terence Rattigan. Both during her time in London and on her return to Barcelona, Carme worked with a variety of theatre companies carrying out translation work and other tasks such as director's assistant, production assistant and runner. While she was in London she translated Duncan Macmillan’s play Lungs into Catalan. This would be the first of her translations to be put on the stage, opening in the Sala Beckett Theatre in Barcelona in 2014.

She has translated plays both alone and as part of the Rereescenes project she started with Neus Bonilla in 2013.

Carme has also translated a varied selection of fiction and non-fiction books by authors such as Virginia Woolf and Herman Melville. In 2025, Llatzer Garcia adapted her translation of Melville's Bartleby, the Scrivener book for his stage play/monologue which was performed at the Sala Beckett Theatre in Barcelona.

She has also published Catalan-language articles in the digital online cultural magazine Núvol.

== List of plays translated and put on stage ==
- Lungs (translated as Pulmons) by Duncan Macmillan. On stage at the Sala Beckett Theatre in Barcelona in 2014, directed by Marilia Samper
- Splendour (Esplendor) by Abi Morgan. Teatre Romea in Barcelona, 2016, directed by Carme Portaceli (translated with Neus Bonilla as part of the Rereescenes project)
- The Price (El Preu) by Arthur Miller. Teatre Goya in Barcelona 2016, directed by Sílvia Munt. Over 17,000 spectators. It returned to the stage in 2017 and toured other theatres in Catalonia in 2019. (Rereescenes)
- Pornography (Pornografia) by Simon Stephens. Centre Cultural La Farinera d'El Clot Theatre, 2018, directed by Iban Beltran for the Parking Shakespeare company.
- Going Dark (Abans que es faci fosc) by Hattie Naylor, Teatre Lliure in Barcelona, 2019, directed by Pep Pla. (Rereescenes)
- Decadence (Decadència) by Stephen Berkoff. Temporada Alta Festival 2019, directed by Glòria Balañà. (Rereescenes). It returned to the stage in 2025 in the Festival Grec.
- Girls and Boys (Nenes i nens) by Dennis Kelly. La Villarroel theatre in Barcelona, 2019, directed by Joel Joan. (Rereescenes)
- Thirst (Assedegats) by Ronan Noone. Teatre Estable in Sabadell, directed by Artur Trias. (Rereescenes)
- Bartleby, monologue adapted by Llatzer Garcia from Carme's translation of the novel Bartleby, the Scrivener (Herman Melville). Sala Beckett in Barcelona, 2025

== Translation of fiction and non-fiction ==
- Narrative of the Life of Frederick Douglass, an American slave. Written by himself An autobiographical book by Frederick Douglass (1845). Translated as Vida d’un esclau americà explicada per ell mateix and published in 2020 (Edicions de la Ela Geminada)
- Bartleby, the Scrivener. A story of Wall Street by Herman Melville (1853). Translated as Bartleby, l’escrivent, published in 2021 (Edicions de la Ela Geminada)
- An adaptation for children of musical pieces from Tchaikovsky’s ballet, the Nutcracker by Élodie Fondacci and Anette Marnat. Translated into Catalan as El Trencanous, and into Spanish as El Cascanueces. Both published in 2022
- A selection of writings on women and literature by Virginia Woolf. Translated as Escriptores. Assaigs i Retrats and published in 2023 (Edicions de la Ela Geminada)
- Carmilla by Sheridan Le Fanu (1872). Translated as Carmilla, published in 2024 (Edicions de la Ela Geminada)
- Remainder by Tom McCarthy (2005). Translated as Romanents and published in 2025 (Editorial Base)

== Others ==
Carme participated in the XXXII Translation Congress organized by the Association of Catalan Language Writers in Barcelona, 2024. She took part in a round table debate on translating Virginia Woolf alongside other translators such as Carlota Gurt, Xavier Pàmies, Marta Pera Cucurell and Dolors Udina.
