= Teodoro Casana Robles =

Peruvian lawyer, historian, journalist, archaeologist, photographer, and geographer

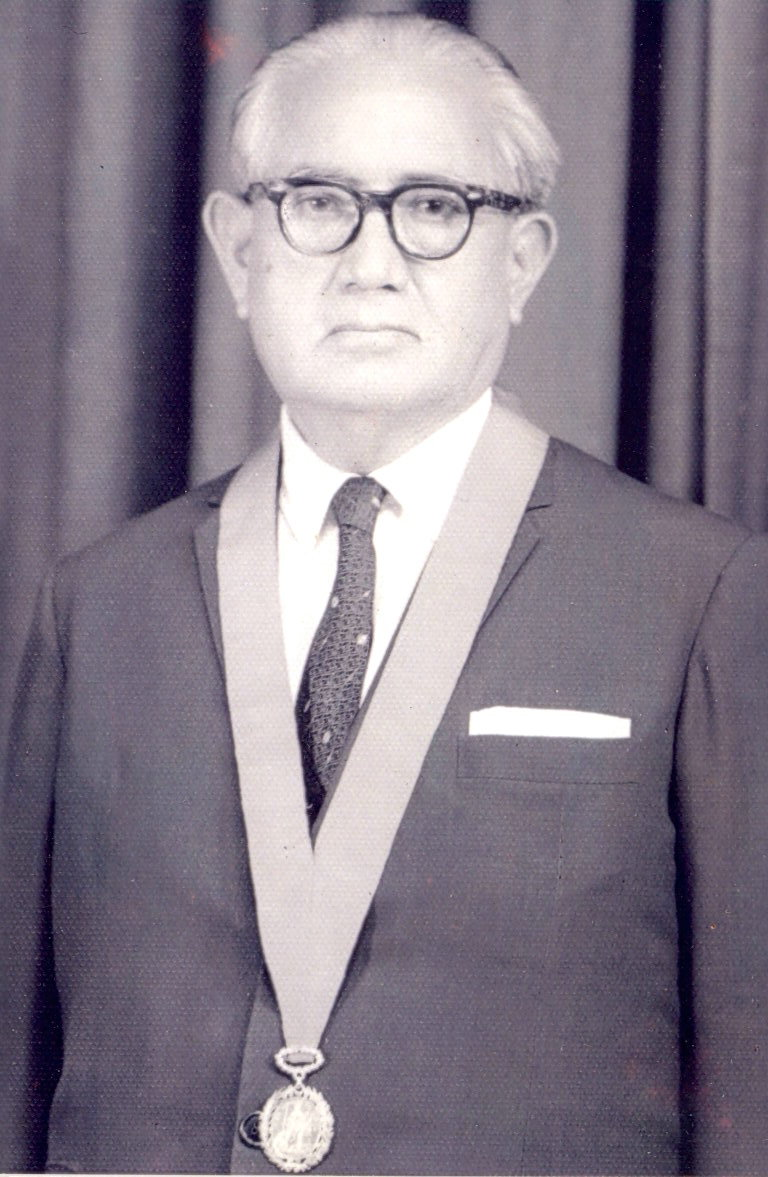
Teodoro Casana Robles

Teodoro Casana Robles (April 1, 1900 – April 21, 1986) was a Peruvian lawyer, historian, journalist, archaeologist, photographer and geographer.
