= Errol Laughlin =

South African cricketer (1947–1986)

Personal information
- Born: 29 April 1947; Durban, South Africa
- Died: 22 April 1986 (aged 38); King William's Town, South Africa
- Source: Cricinfo, 6 December 2020

Errol Laughlin (29 April 1947 – 22 April 1986) was a South African cricketer. He played in 34 first-class and 5 List A matches from 1969/70 to 1983/84.
