= Arnold Rørholt (jurist) =

Norwegian jurist (1909–1986)

Arnold Anderssøn Rørholt (21 January 1909 – 23 April 1986) was a Norwegian jurist and refugee worker.

== Early and personal life ==
He was born in Tønsberg as a son of administrative officer Anders Arnoldsøn Rørholt (1878–1953) and Maja Dannevig (1882–1958). He was married twice, last to Solveig Agnete Erna Wieth-Knudsen, a daughter of professor K. A. Wieth-Knudsen. In his younger days he was an active athlete for the club Tønsbergs TF. Among others he finished twelfth in the Norwegian Championships in pentathlon in 1930, and sixth in the 1931 pentathlon championships.

== Career ==
He finished his secondary education in 1927, took the cand.jur. degree in 1932 and studied at the Graduate Institute of International Studies in Geneva from 1932 to 1934. He was a secretary in the International Labour Organization from 1934, then secretary-general in the Norwegian Red Cross from 1939 to 1950. During the Winter War he worked for a voluntary ambulance unit. He was deposed during the occupation of Norway by Nazi Germany during the war, but was reinstated after the war. During the war, he instead worked in Storebrand from 1943 to 1945. He was also incarcerated in Grini concentration camp between 14 April and 8 October 1942.

After the war he worked with transport of former prisoners. In 1946 he was a founder of the aid organization Aid to Europe. He worked for the United Nations High Commissioner for Refugees in West Germany in 1951 and Austria from 1957 to 1969, and led the High Commissioner's refugee work in Tunisia from 1960 to 1961. He also headed the United Nations aid to Palestinian refugees in Transjordan from 1950 to 1951.

He was decorated with the Austrian Order of Merit, as a Knight First Class of the Order of St. Olav (1959) and Commander of the Order of Polonia Restituta, in addition to Red Cross medals.
