= Leo Hofstee =

American missionary

The Reverend Leo Hofstee O.P.
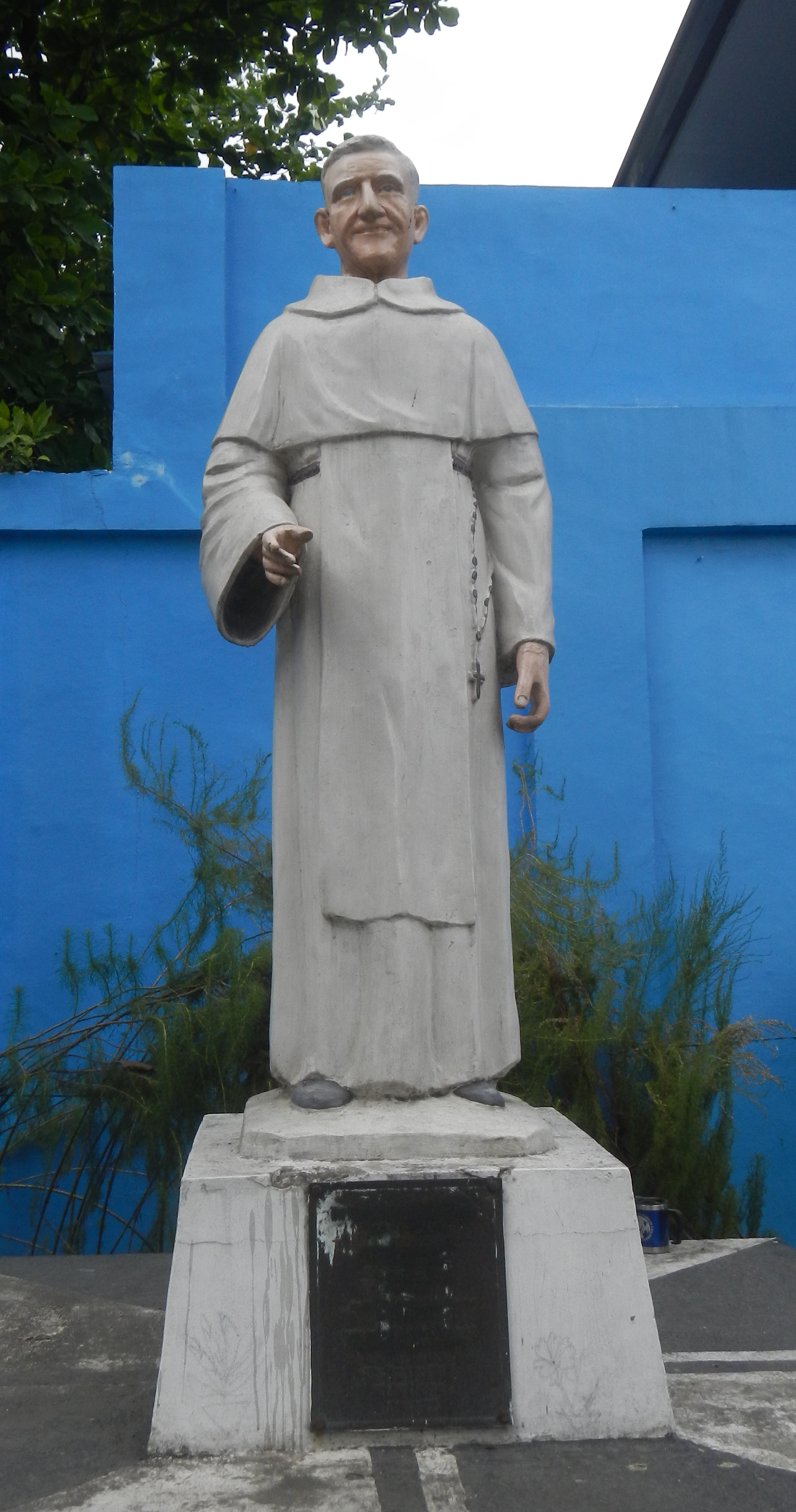
- Monument of Leo Hofstee outside Our Lady of the Holy Rosary Parish, Tala, Caloocan.
- Church: Roman Catholic Church

Orders
- Ordination: 10 May 1932 by Archbishop Michael Joseph Curley

Personal details
- Born: Anthonius Josephus Aloysius Hofstee; July 30, 1903 Utrecht, Netherlands
- Died: April 26, 1986 (aged 82) Tala, Caloocan, Metro Manila, Philippines
- Parents: Dominicus Johannes Hofstee (father); Maria Frederika Peters-Hofstee (mother)
- Occupation: Missionary Priest

Anthonius Josephus Aloysius Hofstee (religious name Leo; 30 July 1903 – 26 April 1986) was a Dutch-born American Roman Catholic priest and member of the Order of Preachers. He was recognized for his ministry, which he started in 1947 until his death, in the district of Tala, in Caloocan, Metro Manila to people with Hansen's Disease. Called as the "Sunshine of Tala", there have been attempts to initiate his cause for canonization but to no progress.

In October 2018, a sexual abuse allegation was deemed established by the Dominican Province of Western United States after consultation with the Province Review Board.

== Biography ==
=== Early life ===
Hofstee was born on 30 July 1903 in Utrecht, Netherlands to Dominicus Johannes Hofstee and Maria Frederika Hofstee née Peters. In 1913, he and his family became naturalized American citizens and lived in Green Bay, Wisconsin.

=== Priesthood and chaplaincy ===
Hofstee professed to the Order of Preachers on 9 September 1926. He was ordained on 10 May 1932 in Washington, D.C. and became a military chaplain in the U.S. Army in March 1942. He celebrated his first mass in on 19 June 1932 at the Church of Our Lady of Perpetual Health in Everett, Washington.

Together with the U.S. marines, Hofstee was sent to the Philippines during World War II in hopes of liberating the county from Japanese occupation. In 1945, after almost four years of Japanese rule, the Philippines was liberated and Americans were sent back home, but Hofstee remained after falling in love with the country and its people.

=== Tala leper colony ===
Moved by the miserable conditions he found by the lepers in Tala, he requested the Dominican Province of the Philippines to be assigned there, and in 1947 became the Province's first foreign missionary. From 1947 until 1986, he served as the resident chaplain to the leper colony, including their educator, counselor, sewing-room director and recreational organizer.

Hofstee established the Holy Rosary College that provides degrees in education to students, taught by qualified professors, both of whom are all leper patients. Leper mothers and children are provided healthcare services and a nursery, administered by the Franciscan Missionaries of Mary. Many of the lepers live in small family houses, dormitories and wards, and live normal lives cultivating the soil, working at handcrafts, studying and teaching. Lepers, who are Dominican tertiarties, recite the entire Liturgy of the Hours daily in common and a leper priest offers mass daily at the Our Lady of the Holy Rosary Parish. There, 16 hours a day, six days a week, Hofstee lived and worked among Tala's 938 men, 529 women and 225 children.

=== Death ===
On 26 April 1986, at the age of 82, Hofstee died in Tala, Caloocan. He was buried in the local cemetery where he was buried among the lepers he ministered and cared. At his funeral, Cardinal Jaime Sin said that

"in the deepest, truest sense, he was one with the inmates of Tala. I suspect that, deep in his heart, he wanted that oneness to be complete, that he wished – perhaps like Damien, the Sacred Heart missionary who tended to the lepers in Molokaʻi, Hawaiʻi – he would contract the affliction so the dividing line separating him from the people he loved would disappear. Well, Father Leo almost got his wish. Late in life, towards the end of his total communion with his wards, his doctors discovered he was suffering from skin cancer. It wasn't what he wanted, but it's fairly close. [Hofstee] is not a saint like Damien of Molokaʻi – at least not yet. But I have no doubt that he is now in the company of the saints in heaven."

In honor of his service to the lepers, a monument was built outside Our Lady of the Holy Rosary Parish in Tala, Caloocan and a street was named after him.
