= Maria Wardasówna =

Polish writer, aviator and resistance fighter (1907–1986)

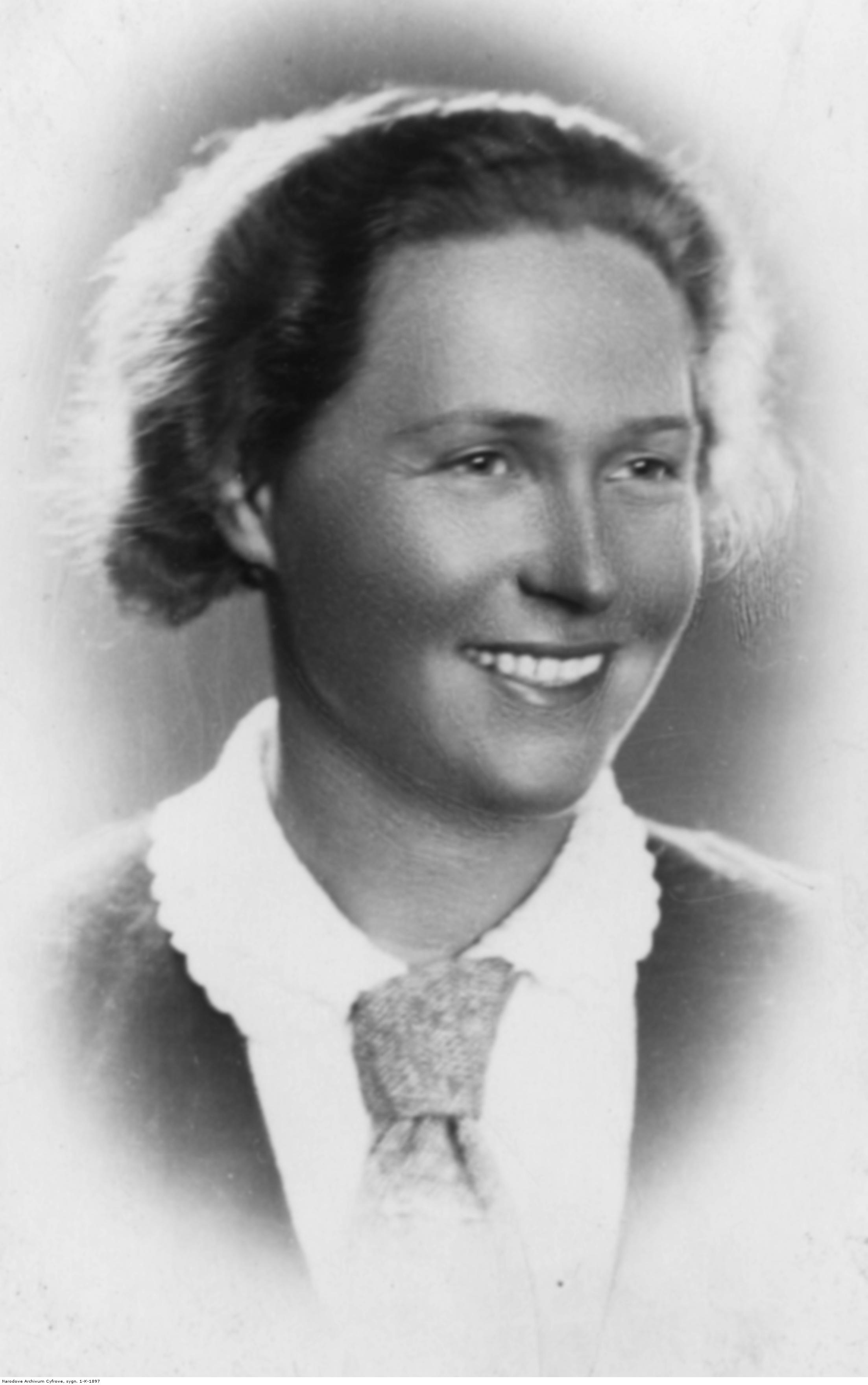
- Maria Wardasówna
- Born: 5 July 1907; Roztropice, Austria-Hungary
- Died: 17 April 1986 (aged 78); Warsaw, Poland
- Resting place: Communal Cemetery, Cieszyn

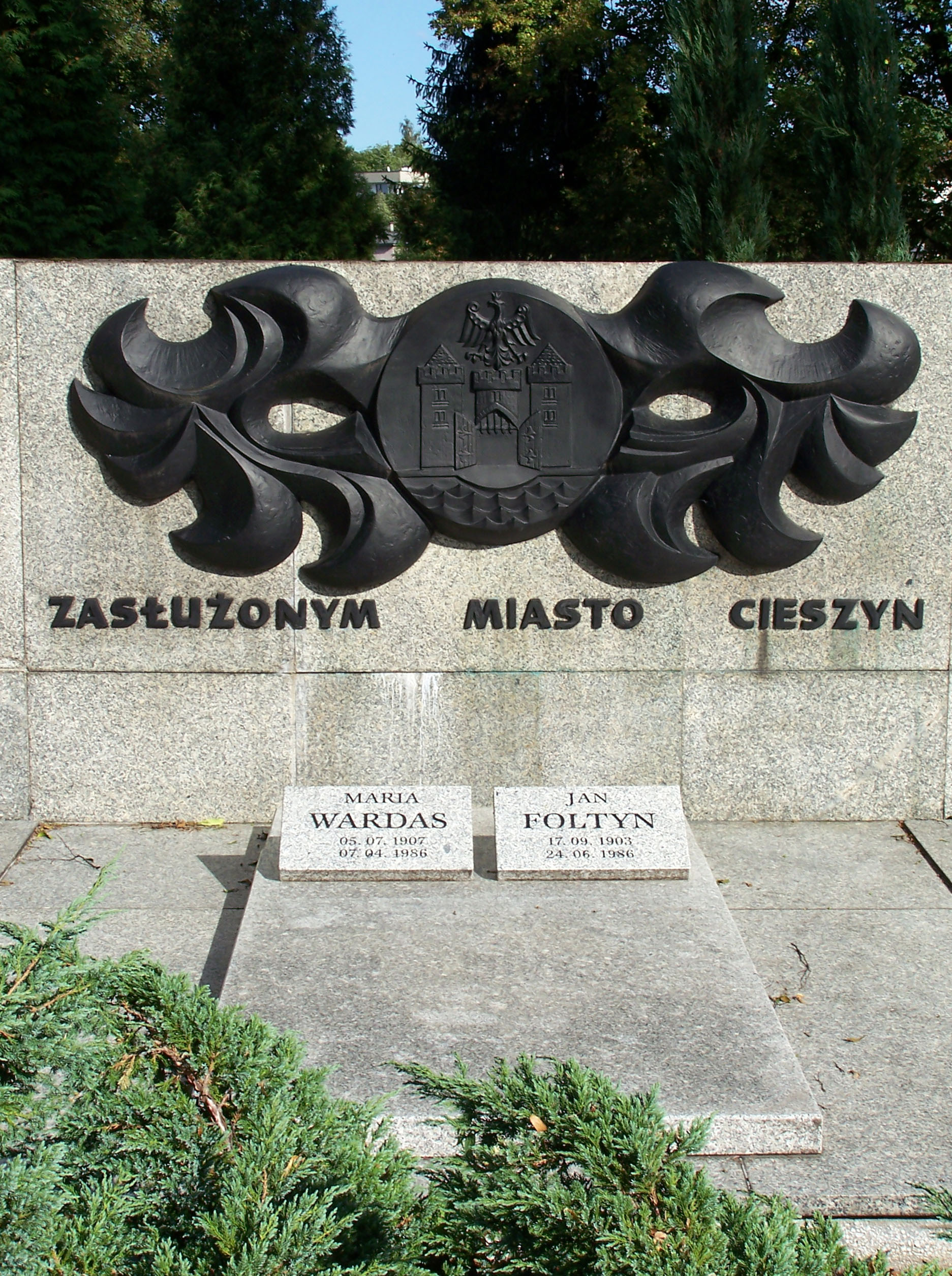
Wardasówna's grave at Cieszyn Communal Cemetery

Maria Wardasówna, or Maria Wardas (5 July 1907 – 17 April 1986) was a Polish writer and aviator.

Wardasówna was born in Roztropice, Cieszyn Silesia and attended school in Skoczów. She studied accounting and shorthand and in 1928 began working in a provincial government office as a stenographer. She became interested in motorbikes and bought one, riding in trousers and attracting criticism from the community and her employer. She was soon fired from her job on the grounds that a government official riding a motorbike brought the government into disrepute.

Wardasówna moved to Katowice and took a new job there. She also joined the Polish Motorsport Association and continued riding her motorbike. In addition, she took flying lessons at the Aero Club of Silesia, and in 1931 she became the first woman in Silesia and second woman in Poland to earn a pilot licence. Also in 1931 Wardasówna participated in an air rally around Poland, finishing in first place. The following year she wrote a diary of the rally and as it was well received, she later developed it into a book, Maryśka from Silesia, which she published in 1937.

She studied under Gustaw Morcinek, a leading Polish writer, in the 1930s, and published her first book in 1934, which was autobiographical; however her writing career was interrupted by the outbreak of World War II. During the war, she worked for an underground resistance movement known as "Wolves". Following the war, she continued writing, and also worked for LOT Polish Airlines.

== Publications ==
- Próba skrzydeł (Trying Wings), (1934)
- Dziewczyna z chmur (A Girl from the Clouds), (1934)
- Maryśka ze Śląska (Little Mary from Silesia), (1935)
- W śniegu i słońcu (In the Snow and the Sun), (1939)
- Rekord Władka Dzięcioła (The Record of Władek Woodpecker), (1947)
- Wyłom (1951–1966)
- Zew przestworzy (The Call of the Skies), (1961) - biographical novel about Franciszek Żwirko and Stanisław Wigura
- Kościuszko" jeździ po Milwaukee (Kościuszko Travels the Milwaukee), (1977)
- Maryśka za wielką wodą (Little Mary over the Big Water), (1988)
