= Helen H. Nowlis =

American psychologist

Helen H. Nowlis (September 22, 1913 – April 2, 1986) was an American motivational psychologist who spent most of her career researching the affective, cognitive, social, and behavioral aspects of drug use. She was appointed as the head of the Office of Alcohol and Drug Abuse Education by President Nixon in 1971, and served as head for 10 years.

== Early life and education ==
Helen Nowlis was born in Cranston, Rhode Island, on September 22, 1913, and grew up in Providence. She received both her B.A. (1934) and her M.A. (1936) from Brown University.

From Brown she moved to Yale University, where she obtained her Ph.D. in personality psychology in 1939. Her dissertation was titled "The influence of success and failure on the resumption of an interrupted task," of which an abridged version was eventually printed in the Journal of Experimental Psychology.

== Career ==
After receiving her Ph.D. from Yale, Nowlis went on to teach and conduct research at Smith College (1939-1940), the University of Connecticut, Connecticut College, and the Iowa Child Welfare Research Station.

In 1951, she became a faculty member at the University of Rochester, where she was also the dean of students from 1965–1967. While at the University of Rochester she began conducting research on the causes and effects of drug use, often focusing specifically on college students. Nowlis' work on drug use led to her appointment as the head of the Office of Alcohol and Drug Abuse Education by President Nixon in 1971, a position that she held for a decade until she retired under President Reagan's administration.

During her time at the University of Rochester Nowlis was very invested in student life, and was involved in the creation of the first co-ed dorm on campus. She and her husband were the first resident advisors of this dorm in 1963.

== Awards ==
Nowlis received an honorary Doctorate of Science (Sc.D.) from Brown University in 1967.

In 1972, she received the Achievement Award of the American Association of University Women.

== Personal life ==
In 1938 she married Vincent Nowlis, also a Ph.D. student at Yale at that time. Helen and Vincent had 3 sons: David, Geoffrey, and Christopher.

Nowlis retired in 1982, and died from cancer on April 2, 1986.
