= Herb Peschel =

American gridiron football player (1913–1986)

Profile
- Positions: Tackle & Guard

Personal information
- Born: September 2, 1913; North Dakota, U.S.
- Died: April 17, 1986 (aged 72); Denver, Colorado, U.S.
- Listed weight: 220 lb (100 kg)

Career information
- College: North Dakota State

Career history
- 1934–1941: Winnipeg Blue Bombers

Awards and highlights
- 3× Grey Cup champion (1935,1939, 1941)

Herbert Alfred Peschel (September 2, 1913 – April 17, 1986) was an American professional football player who played for the Winnipeg Blue Bombers. He won the Grey Cup with them in 1935, 1939 and 1941 and is a member of the Blue Bombers Hall of Fame. He attended North Dakota State University, where he is also a member of their hall of fame.
