= Gianna Camacho =

Peruvian journalist and activist

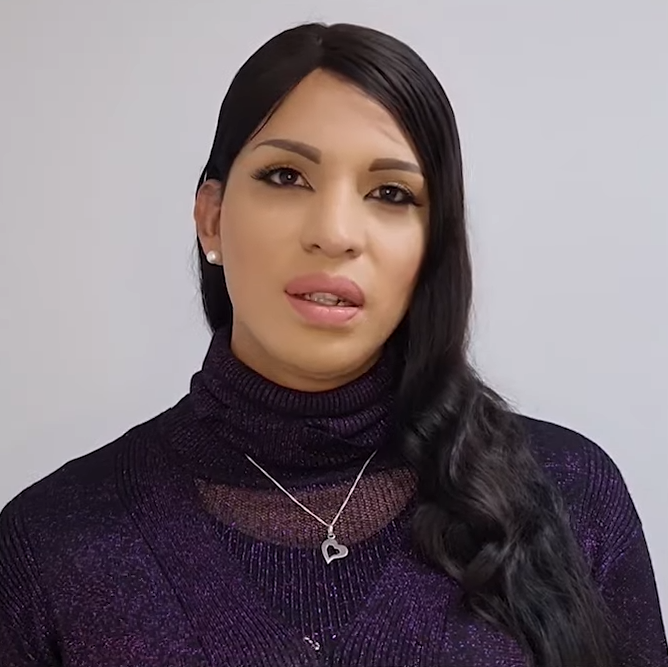
- Camachoin 2021
- Born: July 20, 1987 (age 39); Lima, Peru
- Education: University of Jaime Bausate y Meza
- Occupations: Journalist; trans activist

Gianna Gracielly Camacho García (born July 20, 1987) is a Peruvian journalist and activist for trans rights.

== Biography ==
Camacho studied journalism at the Escuela Jaime Bausate y Meza. After her gender transition, she learned professional makeup. She is the director of Empatía Perú, an association that produces audiovisual and journalistic content to give visibility to the transgender community in Peru. As a trans rights activist, she is part of the Únicxs project at the Research Center of the Universidad Cayetano Heredia, and has served as coordinator of the LGBT Human Rights Observatory of the same university.

In July 2011, she worked as a reporter for the ATV Group until March 2013.

Gianna Camacho in 2019

In 2019, she co-directed the short film Frida with Julio Lossio Quichiz. The film was one of the 10 winners of the contest “Sexual and Gender Diversity: Rights and Citizenship” organized by the IberCultura Viva program in collaboration with the Ministry of Social Development of Uruguay (MIDES).

In 2021, she held meetings with Congress members from various political parties to educate them about the realities of trans people in Peru and to seek their empathy.

In 2022, after several years of bureaucratic struggle, she completed the process for the National Registry of Identification and Civil Status (RENIEC) to change her name on her national identity document.

In 2023, she spoke out about the murder of Ruby Ferrer, a trans sex worker who worked in the streets Zepita, Cañete, Inclán, and Chancay, in the Lima District, where criminals known as "Los Gallegos del Tren de Aragua", a Venezuelan-origin gang extorting other sex workers in the area, murdered Ruby. In response, Camacho joined other trans women in protesting for justice. The protest, called March Against Hate Crimes: For diverse sex worker women, gathered over 3000 people who demonstrated against the wave of transfemicides.

== Filmography ==
- Frida (short film, 2019)
