= Viktor Kokochashvili =

Georgian chemist (1904-1986)

Viktor Kokochashvili (Georgian: ვიქტორ კოკოჩაშვილი) (November 12, 1904, Kutaisi – April 17, 1986) was a Georgian chemist.

He was born in the family of a teacher in Kutaisi.

== Education ==
In 1922 he graduated Kutaisi Classic Gymnasium and enrolled in the faculty of pedagogical studies at Ivane Javakhishvili Tbilisi State University with the main field of studying: chemistry and pharmacy. He graduated the University in 1928. During 1927–1928 years Viktor Kokochashvili worked as an assistant on the chair of inorganic chemistry at Ivane Javakhishvili Tbilisi State University.

== Early career ==
In 1931 Viktor Kokochashvili was appointed as the assistant professor on the chair of inorganic chemistry of the Chemistry-Technological Institute of Dnepropetrovsk. He was awarded with the degree of candidate of chemistry without defending the thesis in the field of studying photochemical reactions in gaseous phase. During 1953-1973 he has been working as an invariable head of the chair of physical chemistry at Ivane Javakhishvili Tbilisi State University. In 1943 he defended the PhD thesis on the following issue: "The study of the combustion of hydrogen and bromine mixtures". In 1944 he was awarded the degree of professor. In 1961 he was awarded with the Honorable Scientist of Georgia. In 1968 he was awarded Jubilee Medals of Ivane Javakhishvili. He died on 17 April 1986, after a brief illness.

He has conducted important researches in the field of chemical kinetics and is considered as the founder of chemical kinetics scientific direction in Georgia. He was a notable representative of N.N Semenov School - the Nobel Prize laureate. During the study of the photochemical kinetic reaction of hydrogen and chlorine, he found the interaction of reaction chains with high-intensity light. He confirmed the thermal nature of the ignition in the chain reaction in the photochemical transformation process of sulfur anhydride. During the study of the reaction of hydrocarbon chlorination, he determined the constants of the elemental reaction speed in the gaseous phase, based on which the relation between the substance structure and the ability to react was found. Study of reaction in hydrogen and bromine in the gaseous phase experimentally proved the achievements of the kinetics school in the field of ignition and burning. He discovered the instability of the flame front and established its theory (1951).

== Publications ==
Kokochashvili was the author of 85 scientific works and 24 manuals and monographs. (1949–88) - Tetralogy of Physical Chemistry (1972–76). Duology of Inorganic Chemistry (1988). Chemistry for attendants at the higher education institutions (7 issues 1964-83). Vakhtang VI "Book on producing oils and chemistry" (1981) and others.

Under the guidance Kokochashvili, dozens of candidate defended their theses of physical studies. Viktor Kokochashvili was a head of the scientific council awarding the degrees at TSU for many years.
