= Antonio Jara =

Spanish professor and former politician

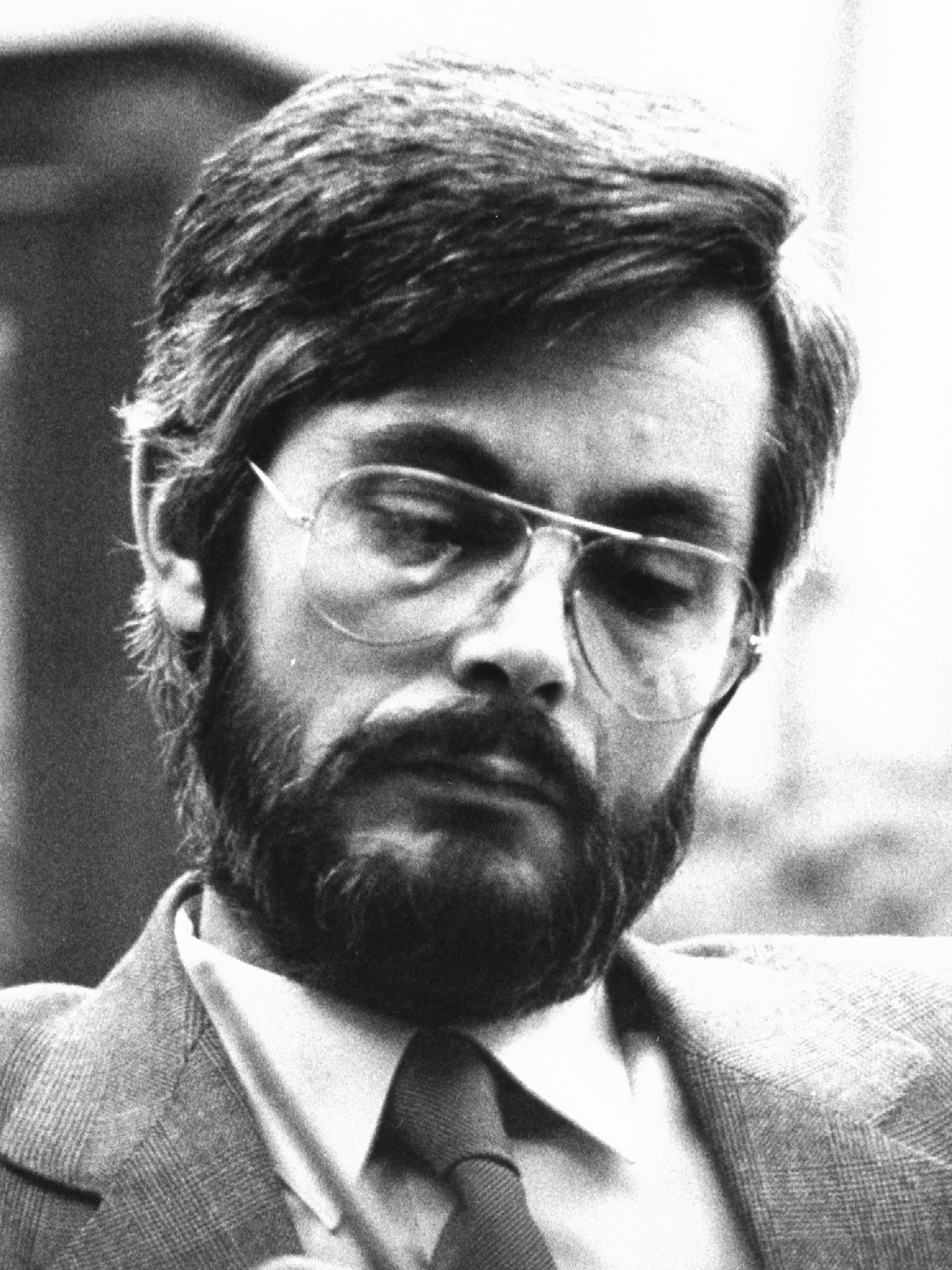
Antonio Jara

Antonio Jara Andréu (born 12 April 1946) is a Spanish professor of law and former politician of the Spanish Socialist Workers' Party (PSOE). He was the mayor of Granada (1979–1991), a member of the Parliament of Andalusia (1982–1986) and a member of the Congress of Deputies (1989–1992). He was the president of the Caja Granada savings bank from 2010 to 2017.

== Biography ==
Jara Andréu was born in Alquerías, near Murcia. He moved to Granada in 1967 for a law degree at the University of Granada while working as a security guard at the institution; he was a professor at the university from 1977 until leaving in 1980 for his political career.

Jara Andréu joined the Unión General de Trabajadores (UGT) trade union in 1973 while it was still proscribed by the Francoist regime, and in 1978 he joined the Spanish Socialist Workers' Party (PSOE). He stood in the April 1979 local elections as sixth on his party's list for Granada City Council, being elected. After a series of resignations, he became mayor on 15 November that year, remaining in office until 1991.

Having also served a member of the Parliament of Andalusia (1982–1986) and a member of the Congress of Deputies (1989–1992), Jara Andréu then left politics to return to his university role.

In September 2009, Jara Andréu was put forward by the provincial leadership of the PSOE and the People's Party (PP) to be the new president of the Caja Granada savings bank from February 2010, as regional laws prohibited incumbent Antonio Claret García from a third term. Early into his term, the bank fused with Caja Murcia, Caixa Penedès and Sa Nostra to form Banco Mare Nostrum, with him taking one of two vice-presidencies. In June 2014, Caja Granada was dissolved as a savings bank and reconstituted as a foundation. In December 2017, with Bankia poised to acquire Banco Mare Nostrum, Jara Andréu resigned.
