= Jack Manners (Canadian football) =

Canadian football player (1914–1986)

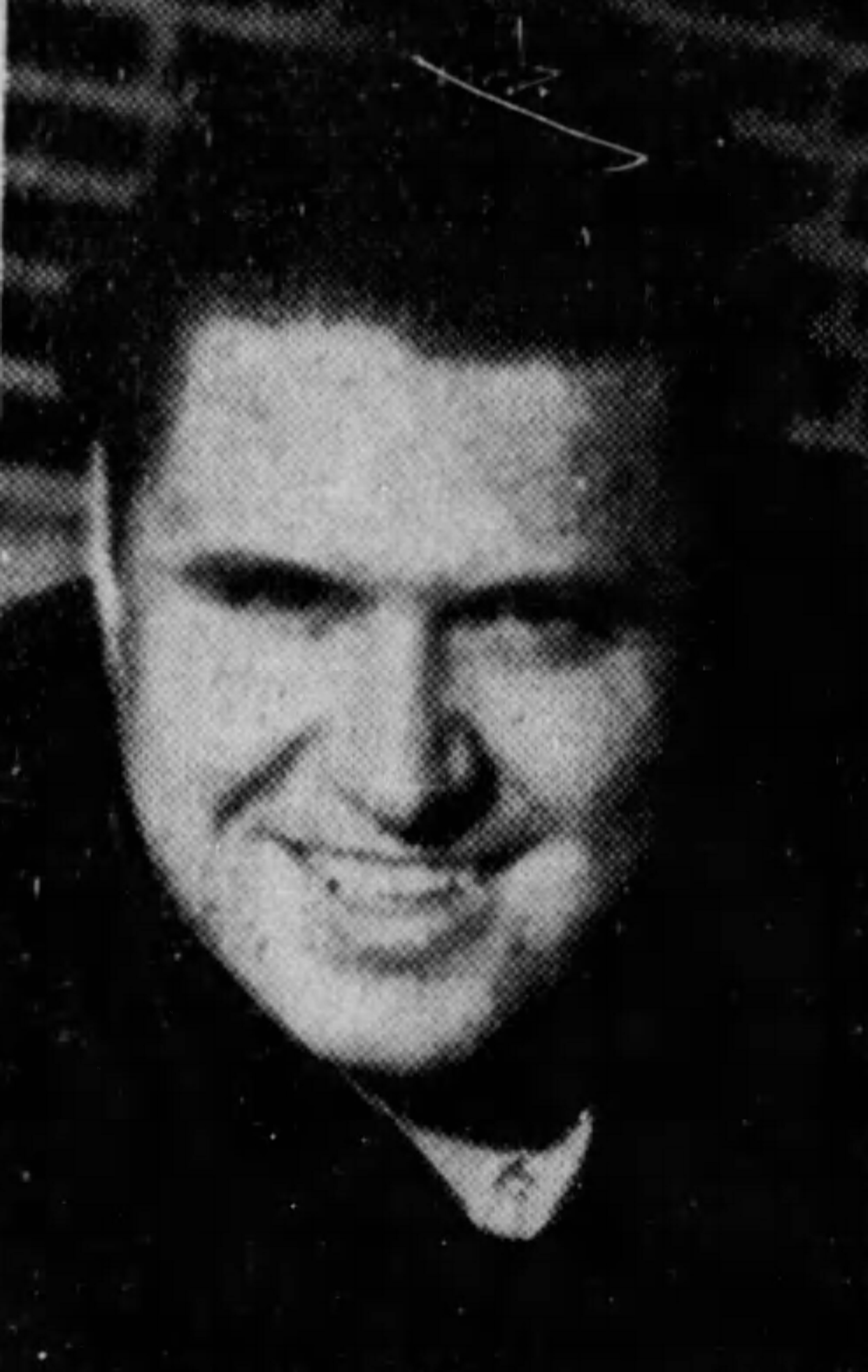
- Manners pictured in a 1941 newspaper

Profile
- Position: Guard

Personal information
- Born: August 26, 1914; Ottawa, Ontario, Canada
- Died: April 11, 1986 (aged 71); Winnipeg, Manitoba, Canada
- Listed height: 5 ft 9 in (1.75 m)
- Listed weight: 200 lb (91 kg)

Career history
- c. 1938–1942: Winnipeg Blue Bombers
- 1945–1946: Winnipeg Blue Bombers

Awards and highlights
- 2× Grey Cup champion (1939, 1941)

John Dougall Manners (August 26, 1914 – April 11, 1986) was a Canadian football player who played for the Winnipeg Blue Bombers. He won the Grey Cup with them in 1939 and 1941.
