= Syd Copley =

English cricketer

Sydney Herbert Copley (1 November 1905 – 1 April 1986) was a cricketer who played one first-class match for Nottinghamshire in 1930. He was born in Hucknall, Nottinghamshire, and died on the Isle of Man.

A right-handed batsman, he scored 4 and 3 in his only first-class match against Oxford University and bowled 5 overs of slow left-arm spin for 28 without success. He played for Nottinghamshire Second XI from 1924 to 1931.

His fame rests on his appearance as "13th man" for England on the final day of the 1930 Trent Bridge test against Australia. On the last day of the test match, Harold Larwood had been taken ill with gastritis so Copley was asked to field as a substitute. Without Larwood, the England attack was seriously weakened, enabling Don Bradman and Stan McCabe to quickly add 77 for the fourth wicket. McCabe struck a ball from Maurice Tate towards the long on boundary. Copley was fielding at deep mid on which is well short of the boundary. He had to dive full length to his right so he could catch the ball just before it made contact with the ground. He managed to hold it despite his momentum causing him to roll over. It is generally agreed that his catch was the turning point of the match, which England went on to win by 93 runs.

From 1939 to 1975, Copley was cricket coach and head groundsman at King William's College on the Isle of Man.
