= Gerald Goddard =

South African water polo player

Personal information
- Nationality: South African
- Born: 22 November 1920; Pretoria, South Africa
- Died: 2 April 1986 (aged 65); Johannesburg, South Africa

Sport
- Sport: Water polo

Gerald Goddard (22 November 1920 – 2 April 1986) was a South African water polo player. He competed in the men's tournament at the 1952 Summer Olympics.
