= Thomas Durnell =

English cricketer

Thomas Wilfred Durnell (17 June 1901 – 10 April 1986) was an English first-class cricketer who played in 14 matches for Warwickshire between 1921 and 1930. He was born in Birmingham and died at Hexham, Northumberland.

A club cricketer in Birmingham, Durnell played for Warwickshire as an amateur. A tail-end left-handed batsman and a right-arm fast bowler, he could, said Wisden Cricketers' Almanack of him in its obituary in 1987, "have made a big difference to Warwickshire between the wars had he been more frequently available".

Durnell played twice for Warwickshire inside a week in 1921, taking one wicket in each of the matches against Yorkshire and Cambridge University, both of which Warwickshire lost heavily. In the first of these games, batting at No 11, Durnell scored 5 not out and 4, and these turned out to be the best performances of a batting career that began badly and got much worse: in six first-class matches in 1928 he only scored one run. He returned to the Warwickshire side in May 1927 and in the match against Northamptonshire he made an immediate impact. He took the last three wickets in the first innings and then, after catching the Northamptonshire captain off the bowling of Freddie Calthorpe, proceeded to take seven second-innings wickets in just 25 balls, finishing with seven for 29 and match figures of 10 for 89. Wisden wrote that he was "almost unplayable". Business commitments and then injury meant that Durnell was able to play only two further matches in 1927, and one of those was almost entirely washed out by rain; but his season's tally of 14 wickets for 179 runs put him at the top of the national bowling averages for the year.

Durnell had further days of success in the 1928 season, when he was able to play six times. Against Leicestershire, he took six first-innings wickets for 71 runs. His next match was a month later and he took five Derbyshire wickets in the first innings at a cost of 63 runs. But in 1929 when he played twice he was less successful and in 1930 his single appearance was his last in first-class cricket.
