= Dudley Gwynne Perkins =

George Dudley Gwynne Perkins (19 March 1911 – 15 April 1986) was a Welsh solicitor, BBC Radio broadcaster, and writer on legal and consumer matters. He presented the programme Can I Help You? and authored the book of the same title, which dealt, in the context of British law, with issues such as buying a house, serving on a jury, making a will, and the legal relationship between husband and wife.

Perkins was born in Narberth, Pembrokeshire, Wales. He was Director-General of the Port of London Authority.

He appeared as a castaway on the BBC Radio programme Desert Island Discs on 18 March 1963.

In 1939, he married Enid Morfydd Prys-Jones. She died in 1943. In 1946, he married Dr. Pamela Marigo Blake.

== Bibliography ==
- —— (1959). Can I Help You?. Cassell.
