= John Grady (author) =

Australian author and academic

John James Grady (1923 – 18 April 1986) is an Australian author and academic.

While a senior lecturer at the Newcastle College of Advanced Education in Newcastle, New South Wales, he wrote two text books for social science students.

== Bibliography ==
- It Didn't Just Happen, Cassell Australia, Melbourne, 1974
- A Country Grows Up: Australia in the making, Cassell Australia, Melbourne, 1975 ISBN 0-7269-3232-9
- "The Manufacture and Consumption of Child Abuse as an Issue". Telos 56 (Summer 1983). New York: Telos Press.
