= Torbjørn Kristoffersen =

Norwegian artistic gymnast

- Full name: Torbjørn Steen Kristoffersen
- Alternative name: Trygve Sten Kristoffersen
- Born: 4 May 1892 Horten, United Kingdoms of Sweden and Norway
- Died: 14 April 1986 (aged 93) Horten, Norway

Gymnastics career
- Discipline: Men's artistic gymnastics
- Country represented: Norway
- Gym: Horten
Medal record
Men's artistic gymnastics
Representing Norway
Olympic Games
Silver medal – second place	1920 Antwerp	Team, free system

Torbjørn Steen Kristoffersen (4 May 1892 – 14 April 1986) was a Norwegian gymnast who competed in the 1920 Summer Olympics. He was part of the Norwegian team, which won the gold medal in the gymnastics men's team, free system event.
