= Jiang Zhaohe =

Chinese artist (1904-1986)

Jiang Zhaohe (Chinese: 蒋兆和; pinyin: Jiǎng Zhàohé; 9 May 1904 – 15 April 1986), or Chiang Chao-ho, was a Chinese artist who played a leading role in the modernization of Chinese painting. At the beginning of the 20th century, he incorporated elements of western painting to portray the great changes in Chinese culture. His work reflects his concern over the cruel realities of life and people's sorrows and differs from the work of artists who showed an indifference towards social reality.

== Early life ==
Jiang was born at Lu county in Sichuan in 1904. Jiang Zhaohe's great-grandfather and the whole family had moved into Lu county of Sichuan from Ma Cheng. He was the only boy born to his generation in the family so he was the hope of the whole family. The other children in his generation were all girls. Because his generation name was Wan (万), his father named him Jiang Wansui (蒋万绥). He lost his parents when he was 13 years old and afterward he also looked after his little sisters.

== Career ==
He was a designer and painter in his early career, however, he became an artist who combined Chinese brush and ink painting with western painting using shading (chiaroscuro) rather than traditional line in his portraits and figure studies. He had no formal art education.

In 1929, he exhibited in the National Art Exhibition in Nanjing.

He taught at the Central Academy of the Fine Arts.

He was elected as the member of the Chinese Artists Association. He was also elected as the consultant and member of China Federation of Literature together with the Institute of Chinese Painting Fellows.

== Works ==
Jiang created a number of famous works, including "Good Friend" (良友), "Victims" (牺牲者), "Cai Ting" (蔡廷), and "Girl" (姑娘). His work, "Du Fu", gained the Reputation Reward. His most famous and influential work, however, is "Refugees" (流民图, Liuming Tu). His works describe the real lives of poor people and the cruelty of society. They shocked society at the difficult time of the Japanese occupation and used a realistic style to portray that dark, hard time. His works are collected in the Painting Collection of Jiang Zhaohe and the National Art Museum of China

He also published books on painting skills and methods of teaching painting. For example, "Problems in Teaching Chinese Figure Painting" (《国画人物写生的教学问题》), "On Drawing Education in Chinese Painting" (《关于中国画的素描教学》), and "The Rules of Chinese Ink Figure Painting" (《中国水墨人物画的造型规律》), and others. Jiang Jiaohe was one of the most important painters in the introduction of chiaroscuro and western style figure and portraiture to Chinese brush and ink painting. His shared with Xu Beihong a firm commitment to realism and a social consciousness that found powerful expression in his art.

== Notes ==
In 1925 Jiang created his first painting "黄包车夫的家庭". In the autumn of 1927 he met Xu Beihong in a friend's home and they established a long lasting friendship. In 1928 he was appointed by Li Yi to teach design at the Education School of Nanjing Central University. In 1930 Jiang transferred to Shanghai Art School as the Drawing Professor. In 1937 he held an exhibition of his latest works in Beiping. In 1943 he exhibited his great scroll painting Refugees (Liuwang Tu), but the exhibition was closed down the next day by Japanese occupation forces. In 1947 Xu Beihong appointed him Professor in the Beiping Art School. In 1950, he was appointed as a Professor in the Central Academy of Fine Art.

== Representative works ==
- http://image.baidu.com/i?tn=baiduimage&ct=201326592&lm=-1&cl=2&word=%BD%AF%D5%D7%BA%CD%CD%BC%CF%F1
