= Haldur Lasthein =

Danish footballer (1905–1986)

Personal information
- Date of birth: 1 June 1905
- Date of death: 24 April 1986 (aged 80)

International career
Years	Team	Apps	(Gls)
1925–1931	Denmark	4	(0)

Haldur Lasthein (1 June 1905 – 24 April 1986) was a Danish footballer. He played in four matches for the Denmark national football team from 1925 to 1931.
