= Tiny Gooch =

American lawyer

Texas Longhorns
- Position: Tackle

Personal information
- Born: August 18, 1903
- Died: April 21, 1986 (aged 82)
- Listed height: 6 ft 7 1/2 in (2.02 m)
- Listed weight: 265 lb (120 kg)

Career information
- College: Texas (1925–1927)

John Aubrey "Tiny" Gooch (August 18, 1903 – April 21, 1986) was an all-around athlete at the University of Texas from 1925 to 1927, where he competed in American football, wrestling and track and field.

== Early life ==
Gooch was born in Ellis County, Texas, near Ennis, the son of Robert E. Gooch and Della Turner. He graduated from Ennis High School and enrolled at the University of Texas.

== Athlete ==
At the University of Texas, Gooch was a member of the Southwest Conference championship track teams from 1925 to 1927 and won the 1927 conference discus championship. He also won the Southwest Conference's 1926 heavyweight wrestling championship. He placed third in the discus at the 1927 NCAA Men's Track and Field Championships. At a Southwest Conference track meet, Gooch, who had a reputation for heckling his opponents, was warned by event official John W. Heisman (also the Rice football coach at the time) that he would be disqualified if he said one word to his chief opponent. Gooch reportedly sat down where he could be seen by his rival and held his lips together with his fingers. After his opponent fouled, Heisman chastised Gooch for violating orders, and Gooch replied, "I did exactly what you said. I not only sat down and didn't say anything but I held my mouth shut so I couldn't."

Gooch was also selected as an All-Southwest Conference tackle while playing for the Longhorns football team. In September 1926, the Associated Press reported that Gooch had reported for football practice "in splendid condition after wrestling all summer with blocks of ice." In November 1926, the Galveston Daily News wrote: "Gooch is another player who has improved rapidly this year. He formerly had difficulty in shifting his big feet, but apparently has overcome this disadvantage. Gooch is one of the hardest fighting tackles the Longhorns have had since the days of Eddie Bluestein. Moore and Gooch make a splendid combination." While attending Texas, Gooch was also the president of the "T" Association and a member of the Theta Xi fraternity.

== Legal and political career ==
Gooch later became a lawyer in Fort Worth, Texas. He was associated for many years with the law firm of Cantey, Hanger, Gooch, Cravens and Scarborough. He was a member of the American College of Trial Lawyers and an active member of the Methodist Church. He was elected president of the Fort Worth Chamber of Commerce in 1959. At 6 feet 7 1/2 inches (2.02 m), Gooch was acknowledged as "the tallest attorney in Texas" until 1950 when T. Armour Ball was admitted to the bar at 6 feet 9 inches (2.06 m). As one of the chief lawyers for the Texas utilities, The Wall Street Journal wrote that Gooch was "considered the patron saint of Texas' electrical independence."

Gooch was also active in Republican Party politics and was selected as the keynote speaker for the 1956 GOP state convention in Houston. In 1961, he was rumored to be a possible Republican candidate for Governor of Texas.

== Track announcer ==
Gooch was also the announcer for the Texas Relays, the San Angelo Relays and other Texas track meets for more than 30 years. In 1961, a Kansas newspaper wrote that, at Texas track meets, Gooch was "as much an attraction" as the sprinters. He became well known for his "extemporaneous and humorous syntax behind the track mike." In the early days of the Texas Relays, he announced the four-mile relay event by telling the audience, "Each man will run or stagger one mile — the darned fools." In 1964, the Associated Press ran an "AP Spotlight" feature on Gooch noting:

Track in Texas has one thing working in its favor, however, in a giant of a man named J. A . ('Tiny') Gooch, who can make you hear him for miles even if the microphone should be out of commission. ... Gooch started announcing the Texas Relays back in 1927. He was a participant in the relay as a discus thrower. He would go over and heave the platter then hurry back and tell the people what was going on. ... He makes it a homey affair telling the fans the inside stuff in 'confidential' talks that carry up to the top of the stands.

== Honors and death ==
Gooch was inducted into the Longhorn Hall of Honor in 1978.

In 1982 the Tiny Gooch Centennial Professorship in Trial Practice was established by the Board of Regents of The University of Texas System for the benefit of the School of Law.

Gooch died in April 1986. He was posthumously inducted into the Texas Longhorns Men's Hall of Honor in 1987.
