= Bill Welsh (footballer, born 1908) =

Australian rules footballer, born 1908

Personal information
- Full name: William George Welsh
- Born: 30 June 1908; Berringa, Victoria
- Died: 12 April 1986 (aged 77); Geelong, Victoria
- Original team: Geelong West
- Height: 175 cm (5 ft 9 in)
- Weight: 79 kg (174 lb)

Playing career^{1}
Years	Club	Games (Goals)
1929–1930	Geelong	5 (0)
- ^{1} Playing statistics correct to the end of 1930.

William George Welsh (30 June 1908 – 12 April 1986) was an Australian rules footballer who played with Geelong in the Victorian Football League (VFL).

Welsh, who was born in Berringa, came to Geelong from local side Geelong West. He made five appearances for Geelong, one in the 1929 VFL season and four in 1930. His 1930 season ended on a good note as he was a centre half-back in Geelong's seconds premiership.
