= Alif Piriyev =

Soviet Azerbaijani army senior lieutenant (1922–1986)

Alif Turihan oglu Piriyev
- Əlif Turxan oğlu Piriyev
- Born: 10 January 1922; Qoltuk, Azerbaijan SSR, Soviet Union
- Died: 20 April 1986 (aged 64); Baku, Soviet Union
- Military career
- Allegiance: Soviet Union
- Branch: Soviet Army
- Service years: 1941–1953
- Rank: Senior lieutenant
- Unit: 32nd Guards Rifle Division
- Conflicts: World War II; Battle of the Caucasus; Kerch-Eltigen Operation; Crimean Offensive
- Awards: Hero of the Soviet Union

Alif Turihan oglu Piriyev (Azerbaijani: Əlif Turxan oğlu Piriyev; 10 January 1922 – 20 April 1986) was an Azerbaijani Soviet Army senior lieutenant and Hero of the Soviet Union. Piriyev was awarded the title for his actions during the Crimean Offensive in the assault on Mount Sapun. In the battle, he was reported to have killed fifteen German soldiers. He was awarded the title Hero of the Soviet Union on 24 March 1945. Piriyev continued to serve in the army postwar, and retired in 1953 as a senior lieutenant. He lived in Baku, working in the Ministry of Road Transport.

== Early life ==
Piriyev was born on 10 January 1922 in the village of Qoltuk in what is now Neftchala District in the family of a worker. He graduated from the eighth grade and afterwards worded as an assistant oil production operator in the Neftchala oil fields.

== World War II ==
Piriyev was drafted into the Red Army in October 1941. He fought in combat from May 1942. His first action was fought on the Southern Front during the retreat in the Battle of the Caucasus. In February 1943 he fought in the Novorossiysk-Maikop Offensive and reportedly destroyed a German machine gun with a hand grenade. He fought in the Malaya Zemlya for seven months. In September 1943 he participated in the Kerch–Eltigen Operation.

Piriyev became a sergeant and squad leader in the 80th Guards Rifle Regiment of the 32nd Guards Rifle Division. In April and May 1944, Piriyev fought in the Crimean Offensive. On 7 May, the first day of the attack on Mount Sapun, Piriyev's squad reportedly destroyed several German firing points. On the next day, the squad climbed up a section of the mountain and threw grenades at three firing points, reportedly killing twenty German soldiers. On 9 May, his company commander was killed and Piriyev took command, reportedly leading the assault. The company captured fortifications on Mount Sapun. With grenades and machine gun fire during the battle, Piriyev reportedly killed fifteen German soldiers and captured a staff officer. He was wounded but stayed on the battlefield. On 24 March 1945, Piriyev was awarded the title Hero of the Soviet Union and the Order of Lenin.

== Postwar ==
Piriyev continued to serve in the Soviet Army postwar. In 1945 he graduated from courses for junior lieutenants. He retired from the army in 1953 with the rank of senior lieutenant. Piriyev lived in Baku and worked in the Ministry of Road Transport. He was awarded the Order of the Patriotic War 1st class on 6 April 1985 on the 40th anniversary of the end of World War II. Piriyev died on 20 April 1986.

Secondary School No. 2 in Neftçala is named for Piriyev.
