= John W. F. M. Huffer =

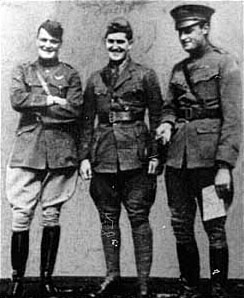
- Major John W.F.M. Huffer (right) standing beside Lts. Winslow (left) and Campbell (center) of the 94th Aero Squadron
- Born: June 15, 1895
- Died: April 23, 1986 (aged 90)
- Military career
- Allegiance: France United States of America
- Branch: French Foreign Legion Aeronautique Militaire United States Army Air Service
- Service years: 1915-1919
- Rank: Major
- Units: Escadrille N95, Escadrille N62, Escadrille F36, Escadrille Spa62, 94th Aero Squadron, 93rd Aero Squadron
- Commands: 94th Aero Squadron, 93rd Aero Squadron
- Wars: World War I
- Awards: Distinguished Service Cross, Croix de Guerre with Three Palms and Two Stars, Médaille Militaire

John W. F. M. Huffer (June 15, 1895 – April 23, 1986) was an American military aviator who saw action during the First World War on the ground and in the air. He served with the French armed forces, first with the Foreign Legion and then in the Aeronautique Militaire, before being commissioned into the U.S. Army Air Service in 1917.

== Early years ==
John Huffer was born in Paris, France, on June 15, 1895, to American parents, detail which would allow him to be commissioned into the U.S. Army Air Service after the American entry into the war. He lived in France his entire life, never setting foot in an English-speaking country until after his discharge from the Air Service.

== World War I ==
=== French service ===
John Huffer enlisted in the French Foreign Legion on 28 September 1915, where he served for three months before applying for the Aeronautique Militaire on 1 January 1916. He was accepted in short order and received instruction at Pau, Cazeaux and Avord, completing his flight instruction on 1 April 1916, after which he was assigned to Escadrille N95 later that month.

In June 1916, Huffer was reassigned to Escadrille N62, where he would remain until March 1917. While assigned to the N62, Huffer would score three confirmed aerial victories in the squadron's newly-supplied Nieuport fighters. Indeed, although Huffer is credited with four confirmed aerial victories, only the three recorded by the N62 can be verified. Despite leaving the squadron in March 1917, it's not until July of the same year that Huffer returns to the front, this time with Escadrille F36, equipped with Farman reconnaissance aircraft. While assigned to F36, Huffer saw service on the Italian front, conducting reconnaissance missions until his return to France in September 1917.

Returning to France after service on the Italian front with Escadrille F36, Huffer returned to Escadrille 62, newly equipped with Spad fighters and redesignated Escadrille SPA62. Huffer's time with the SPA62 is brief, as on 7 November 1917, Huffer is commissioned into American service. Huffer ended his service with the Aeronautique Militaire holding the rank of sous-lieutenant and was awarded the Médaille militaire and the Croix de Guerre with three Palms and two Stars.

=== American service ===
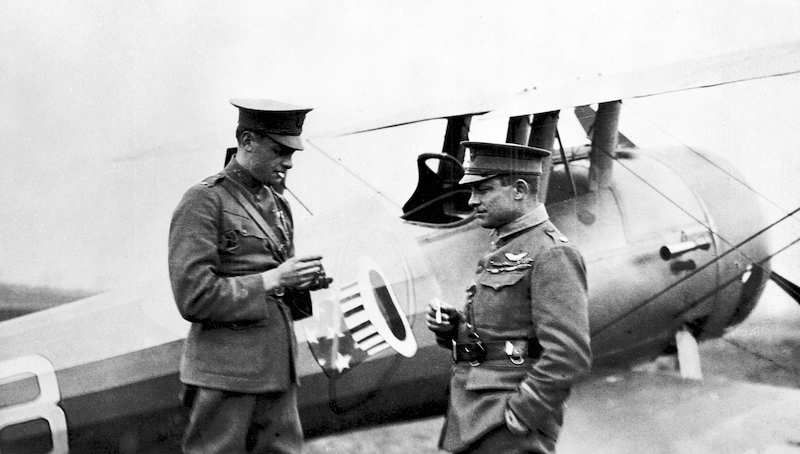
Huffer and Lufbery, April 18, 1918

John Huffer was commissioned into the Aviation Section of the Signal Corps as a major in November 1917. On 7 March 1918, Huffer arrived at the newly-formed 94th Aero Squadron of the U.S. Army Air Service to take command. Sources conflict on his predecessor, some claiming Major Raoul Lufbery was in command, but most agreeing that Huffer arrived to replace the acting Commanding Officer of the 94th Aero Squadron, Lt. Henry L. Lyster, effectively making Huffer the first Commanding Officer of the 94th Aero Squadron. Indeed, Major Lufbery was never officially the Commanding Officer of the 94th despite the squadron being formed around him, with Lt. Lyster being the acting C.O. until the arrival of Major Huffer.

Huffer held this post until he was relieved of duty as commanding officer on 5 June 1918 and transferred to the 1st Air Depot at Colombey-les-Belles as Assistant Operations Officer. Sources conflict on the reason for this sudden removal from command. Some claim this was a result of Huffer's non-performance on 19 May 1918, when Lt. Oscar Gude and Major Huffer both failed to shoot down a German observation plane, which in turn shot down and killed Major Lufbery when he attempted to intercept. Others claim, however, that Huffer was forced to return with engine trouble, accounting for his non-performance on that day, as well as noting that his fluency in French was a desirable trait as a liaison officer, landing him at Headquarters Air Service, 1st Army, until July 1918. His brief removal from the front was quickly rectified, however, and on 25 July 1918, Huffer was given command of the 93rd Aero Squadron, command which he held until the end of the war.

As Commanding Officer, Huffer led the 93rd Aero Squadron during the Saint Mihiel and Meuse-Argonne offensives in the fall of 1918. Operating as part of the 1st Pursuit Wing, the 93rd provided air superiority over the battlefield by ensuring the protection of friendly bomber and reconnaissance aircraft, destroying German fighters and reconnaissance aircraft and balloons, and providing direct support to ground troops. Inclement weather mitigated much of the support provided by the 1st Pursuit Wing during the Saint-Mihiel offensive until 14 September. The 93rd, however, was severely hampered by a lack of both experience and material throughout the Saint-Mihiel offensive, a situation that would continue until the Meuse-Argonne offensive and the armistice, though the squadron was nevertheless able to account for eight confirmed kills during the Saint-Mihiel offensive.

== Post war life ==
=== Court martial ===
On 28 November 1918, Huffer faced a court martial for the accusations leveled by Major Johnson in June. Huffer allegedly caused a woman by the name of Marcelle Collas, "a common prostitute", to be present at a dance on 22 June 1918, with other U.S. officers and civilians present. The accusations were leveled by Major Davenport Johnson, and were largely seen as a farce due to the ongoing power struggles that involved Johnson (in which Huffer had become unwittingly involved), petty grudges held by Johnson against Huffer, and the difficulty in determining whether Marcelle Collas was indeed a prostitute. Ultimately, Huffer was acquitted.

=== Dismissal ===
Shortly after the court martial, Huffer was ordered to the U.S. where he was released from service.
