= Frederick Dawson =

New Zealand cricketer

Frederick Francis Dawson (19 June 1917 – 27 April 1986) was a New Zealand cricketer.

Born in Timaru, Dawson played three first class matches for Canterbury in the 1950–51 season. He died, age 68, in Christchurch.
