= José António Camacho =

Portuguese politician (1946–2025)

Member of the Assembly of the Republic of Portugal for Funchal
- In office 3 June 1976 – 2 January 1980

Member of the Constituent Assembly of Portugal
- In office 2 June 1975 – 2 April 1976

Personal details
- Born: April 1946
- Died: 13 July 2025 (aged 79)
- Political party: PSD

José António Camacho (April 1946 – 13 July 2025) was a Portuguese politician. A member of the Social Democratic Party, he served in the Constituent Assembly from 1975 to 1976 and in the Assembly of the Republic from 1976 to 1980. He was Regional Secretary of Planning, Finance and Commerce in the first Regional Government of Madeira.

Camacho died on 13 July 2025, at the age of 79.
