= Ed Halicki (American football) =

American football player (1905–1986)

Profile
- Position: Back

Personal information
- Born: December 23, 1905; Kingston, Pennsylvania, U.S.
- Died: April 27, 1986 (aged 80); Ashley, Pennsylvania, U.S.
- Listed height: 5 ft 9 in (1.75 m)
- Listed weight: 185 lb (84 kg)

Career information
- High school: Hanover Area (PA)
- College: Bucknell

Career history
- Frankford Yellow Jackets (1929-1930); Minneapolis Red Jackets (1930)
- Stats at Pro Football Reference

Edward Henry Halicki (December 23, 1905 – April 27, 1986) was an American football player. He played college football for Bucknell and professional football in the National Football League (NFL) for the Frankford Yellow Jackets (1929–1930) and Minneapolis Red Jackets (1930).

== Early life ==
Halicki was born in Kingston, Pennsylvania, in 1905. He graduated from Hanover Township High School in 1925. He was the captain of Hanover's football, basketball, and baseball teams.

He attended Bucknell University where he played on the football, baseball, and basketball teams from 1925 to 1928. On the football team, he was co-captain as a senior and played at the fullback position. Halicki also served as a place-kicker at Bucknell, successfully converting 18 of 19 extra point kicks as a senior in 1928.

He suffered a broken nose while playing football at Bucknell, and head coach Carl Snavely designed a stainless steel mask covered in leather for Halicki to wear to protect the nose. He became known as the "man with the iron mask."

== Professional football ==
Halicki played professional football in the NFL as a back for the Frankford Yellow Jackets during their 1929 and 1930 season. In a 17–0 victory over Clifton Heights during the 1929 season, he accounted for 10 of Frankford's 17 points on a field goal, a touchdown run, and an extra point.

He finished the 1930 season with the Minneapolis Red Jackets. He appeared in a total of 32 NFL games, 19 of them as a starter. He scored 74 points during his NFL career (10 touchdowns, one field goal, and 11 extra points). He also played professional baseball in the St. Louis Cardinals organization.

== Later life ==
After his football career ended, he lived in the Askam section of Hanover Township, Pennsylvania. He was a teacher at Hanover Township High School for nearly 40 years from 1932 to 1971. He was also Hanover's football coach for 20 years, compiling a record of 92-77-1. He also served in the United States Navy during World War II.

In 1983, he was inducted into the Bucknell University Athletic Hall of Fame based on his contributions as an athlete.

He died in 1986 at age 80 at St. Stanislaus Medical Center in Sheatown, Pennsylvania.
