= Eugen Grimminger =

Member of the White Rose resistance group in Nazi Germany

- Born: 29 July 1892; Crailsheim, Germany
- Died: 10 April 1986 (aged 93); Schanbach, near Stuttgart, West Germany
- Occupations: certified auditor, president of the Württembergischer Landesverbandes landwirtschaftlicher Genossenschaften

Franz Eugen Grimminger (29 July 1892 – 10 April 1986) was a member of the White Rose resistance group in Nazi Germany.

== Early life ==
Eugen Grimminger, son of a train driver, participated as a volunteer in the First World War and then worked as a civil servant in Crailsheim. After his war experiences he became a pacifist. He read books about Mahatma Gandhi and Buddhism and left the protestant church. According to Grimminger, he adhered to Buddhist beliefs. He became an advocate of non-violence and a vegetarian in 1919.

In 1922, he married Jenny Stern in Stuttgart. His marriage to a Jewish woman was rejected in his circle of acquaintances and relatives. The young married couple settled in Stuttgart, where Grimminger was employed as an auditor at the Association of Agricultural Cooperatives. In 1925 he became a dairy inspector of the association and in 1930 was auditor-in-chief and head of the department.

== In Nazi Germany ==
In 1935 Grimminger lost his job because of his being married to a Jewish woman. Two years later, Eugen Grimminger became a self-employed certified auditor. He also helped people to flee to Switzerland, for which fake documents were necessary. In 1942 Eugen Grimminger took over the book-keeping office of his friend Robert Scholl, who had been denounced for "anti-state statements" and had to serve a four month prison sentence. This office was located in the residential building of the Scholl family. As a result, Grimminger met Inge, Hans and Sophie Scholl and came in contact with the White Rose resistance group. The group was supported by Grimminger mainly by donations in kind and sums of money, which he had partly collected from his acquaintances. He was assisted by his secretary Tilly Hahn.

On 18 February 1943, the Gestapo arrested Hans and Sophie Scholl for spreading leaflets. In the course of the subsequent interrogations, Grimmingers name was mentioned. On 2 March 1943, he was arrested and on 19 April 1943, in the second trial against members of the White Rose, he was sentenced for support to high treason to ten years in prison. The public prosecutor had also demanded the death penalty for him, however, ultimately could prove only a transfer of money, not what he actually knew about how the money was intended to be used. His Jewish wife, until then protected from persecution, was arrested on 10 April 1943, then deported and murdered in Auschwitz. Eugen Grimminger was imprisoned in the Zuchthaus Ludwigsburg until April 1945.

== After the war ==
After the war he became president of the regional association of agricultural cooperatives in Stuttgart. In 1947 he married Tilly Hahn. In 1958 he retired. He was involved in animal welfare and was chairman of the Tierschutzverein Stuttgart for many years. He also founded the Grimminger Foundation for Anthropozoonosis Research to research and control animal diseases that are transmissible to humans. The foundation was later renamed the Grimminger Foundation for Zoonotic Research.

== See also ==
- Alexander Schmorell
- Kurt Huber
