= Henry Kemp-Blair =

South African playwright (1930–1986)

- Born: Henry John Kemp-Blair; April 15, 1930; South Africa
- Died: April 30, 1986 (aged 56); Orange, California, USA
- Education: Claremont College; Chapman College; Cal State Long Beach; USC
- Occupations: Educator, clergyman, playwright
- Spouse: Ramona
- Writing career
- Period: 1960-1986

Henry Kemp-Blair (April 15, 1930 – April 30, 1986) was a South African-born playwright, director, clergyman and educator that was instrumental in developing the theater program at Chapman University.

== Biography ==
=== Background ===
Henry John Kemp-Blair was born April 15, 1930, in South Africa and immigrated to the United States in 1946. He studied theology at Claremont College. Kemp-Blair trained in theater arts at Chapman College, Cal State Long Beach and USC. He became naturalized as a U.S. Citizen in 1975.

=== Career ===
In 1960, Kemp-Blair joined the faculty of Chapman where he was instrumental in developing their theatre arts program. Spending over twenty-five years on the faculty, Kemp-Blair wrote, produced and directed a number of plays there. One of his most famous plays is "The Tea Concession," a drama set in South Africa in which the racial positions of black and white are reversed. He staged a production of the play in March 1966 at Chapman.

=== Death ===
He died of a heart attack on April 30, 1986. The night before his death, he had been rehearsing for "Dance Is," a dance show that was scheduled to open the day after his death.

== Legacy ==
- The Henry Kemp-Blair Shakespeare Festival at Chapman University is named in his honor. The goal of the festival "is to provide high school students with an opportunity to experience and learn more about performing Shakespeare."
