= Bluebeard (Frisch novel) =

1982 novel by Max Frisch

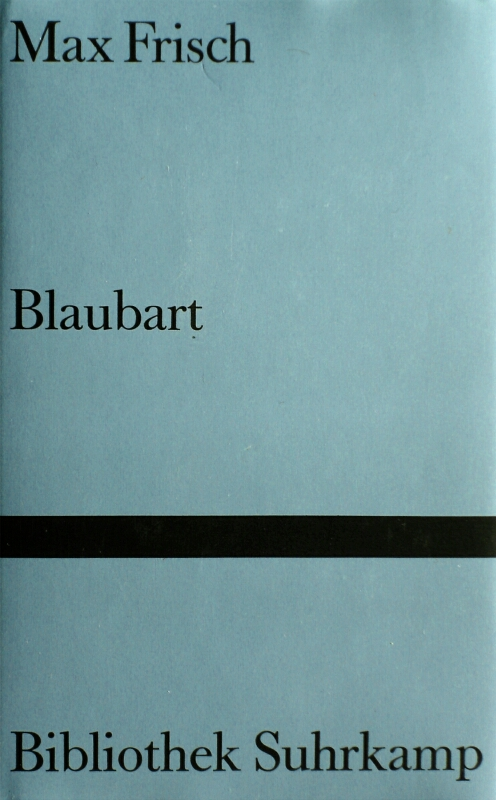
- Book cover
- Author: Max Frisch
- Original title: Blaubart
- Translator: Geoffrey Skelton
- Language: German
- Publisher: Suhrkamp Verlag
- Publication date: 1982
- Publication place: Germany
- English publication date: 1982
- Pages: 171
- ISBN: 3518028448

Bluebeard (German: Blaubart) is a 1982 novel by the Swiss writer Max Frisch. It tells the story of a medical doctor who is accused of murdering his ex-wife. It was Frisch's last novel.

== Reception ==
Hans Mayer of Die Zeit called Bluebeard "A beautiful new story, which with Montauk and Holocene clearly rounds off an epic triptych. Reinhard Baumgart of Der Spiegel described it as "very taciturn, yes a quiet book", and wrote that "In parts, the story truly speaks the embarrassing, suggestive and all but naked language of dreams, of the repression of a very bright and sometimes also too weakly lit dream."

== Film ==
- Bluebeard (1984, TV film directed by Krzysztof Zanussi), with Vadim Glowna, Margarethe von Trotta, Barbara Lass, Karin Baal, Vera Tschechowa, Maja Komorowska, Elisabeth Trissenaar

== See also ==
- 1982 in literature
- Swiss literature
