= Homo Faber =

Homo Faber may refer to:

- Homo faber, a philosophical concept articulated by Hannah Arendt and Max Scheler
- Homo Faber (novel), a novel by Max Frisch
