= Max Frisch Archive =

Swiss research institute

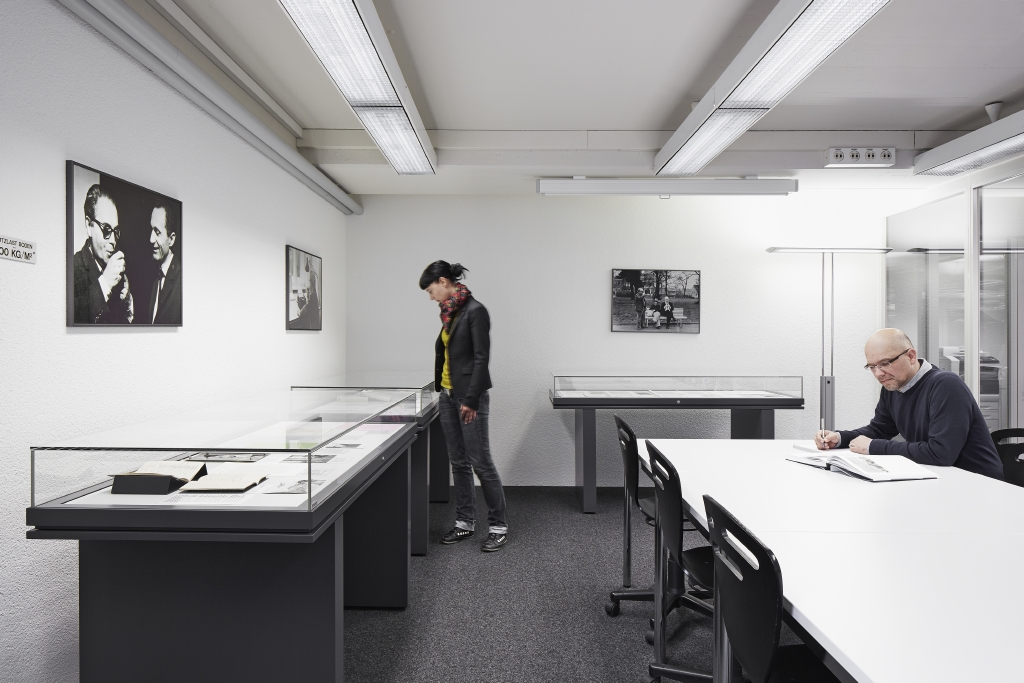

The Max Frisch Archive is an independent research institution that belongs to the Max Frisch Foundation and is based at ETH Library. It curates the literary legacy of Swiss author Max Frisch and is available for academic, journalistic and artistic research.

== History ==
The Max Frisch Archive was preceded by the launch of the Max Frisch Foundation in 1979. Together with his publisher Siegfried Unseld and the other members of the Board of Trustees (Peter Bichsel, Adolf Muschg and Peter von Matt), Frisch decided to "create a Max Frisch Archive to be located in Switzerland as a place of research". After the author’s death, the Foundation was to take over “the administration of his literary legacy with all the rights and responsibilities”.

The Max Frisch Archive was established in the Department of German Language and Literature at ETH Zurich in 1980. In 1981 the German philologist Walter Obschlager became its first archivist: The archive has been open to the public since April 1983. In April 2004 the archives moved to ETH Library premises, where they have also been integrated organisationally since 1 September 2016. Literary scholar Tobias Amslinger has been running the archive since 1 September 2016.

== Holdings and key figures ==
The literary legacy of Max Frisch makes up the core of the holdings. These include his letters and notebooks, manuscripts and typescripts, plans and business documents from his time as an architect, as well as various personal documents. An extensive collection of newspaper and magazine articles, photographs, film recordings, theatre posters and programmes documents the international resonance and reception of his work. Hence, the Max Frisch Archive serves as a main source for literary studies and commentaries in the field. French literary scholar Ruth Vogel-Klein wrote for instance about Montauk: "The writing process can be reconstructed because Frisch gave his various typescript versions to the Max Frisch Archive that he founded in Zurich in 1981."

- Around 110 metres of archival material (typescripts, letters, notebooks etc.)
- 3,098 books
- 4,959 photos
- 497 CDs and DVDs

(Status: 1 January 2017)

== Max Frisch Foundation's Board of Trustees ==
The composition of the Board of Trustees continues to follow Frisch's specifications. The committee must include at least one author and one literary scholar, along with the publisher of the works of Max Frisch and one family representative:

- Thomas Strässle (President)
- Lukas Bärfuss
- Peter Frisch
- David Gugerli
- Jonathan Landgrebe
- Markus Notter

The Max Frisch Foundation's Board of Trustees also makes up the judging panel for the Max Frisch Prize, which is awarded by the City of Zurich every four years and carries CHF 50,000 in prize money.

== Ongoing projects ==
- Digitization project MFA-online
- Temporary exhibitions in the main ETH Zurich building and the Max Frisch Swimming Pool
- Tours and events
- Editions from the personal papers
