= Michael Bullock =

English writer (1918–2008)

Michael Hale Bullock (19 April 1918 – 18 July 2008) was a British poet, novelist and translator.

He was born in London and studied at the Hornsey College of Art. He went to Canada in 1968 as a Commonwealth Fellow at the University of British Columbia, where he later taught creative writing and translation, finally retiring as emeritus professor in 1983.

He translated nearly 200 literary works from French and German into English, and won many awards in the process. These included the Canada Council French Translation Award (1979) for his translation of Michel Tremblay's short story collection Stories for Late Night Drinkers, and the inaugural Schlegel-Tieck Prize. He was the principal English translator of Swiss playwright and novelist Max Frisch.

He also published numerous works of prose and poetry under his own name. His novella Randolph Cranstone and the Glass Thimble (1977) was named British New Fiction Society Book of the Month.

He was the founder of British poetry magazine Expression and editor-in-chief of Prism International.

He died in London.

== Bibliography ==
=== Poetry ===
- Transmutations (1938). Published under the name Michael Hale.
- Sunday Is a Day of Incest: Poems (1961)
- World Without Beginning, Amen! (1963)
- A Savage Darkness: Poems (1969)
- Black Wings, White Dead: Poems (1978)
- Lines in the Dark Wood: Poems (1981)
- Quadriga for Judy: Poems (1982)
- Prisoner of the Rain: Poems in Prose (1983)
- Brambled Heart: Poems (1985)
- Dark Water: Poems (1987)
- Poems on Green Paper (1988)
- Vancouver Moods: Poems, Photographs (1989)
- Avatars of the Moon (1990)
- The Secret Garden (1990)
- Labyrinths: Poems from Five Cities (1992)
- The Inflowing River: Poems (1993)
- The Sorcerer with Deadly Nightshade Eyes followed by The Foundling at the Bottom of the Well: Poems in Verse and Prose (1993)
- The Sorcerer with Deadly Nightshade Eyes: Poems (1995)
- Dark Roses: Variations on a Theme (1994)
- Moons and Mirrors: Poems (1994)
- Stone and Shadow: Poems (1996)
- Sonnet in Black and Other Poems (1998)
- Erupting in Flowers: Poems (1999)
- Nocturnes: Poems of Night (2000)
- Wings of the Black Swan: Poems of Love and Loss (2001)
- Colours: Poems (2003)
- Seasons: Poems of the Turning Year (2008)

=== Novels and short stories ===
- Sixteen Stories as They Happened (1969)
- Green Beginning, Black Ending: Fables (1971)
- Randolph Cranstone and the Pursuing River: Parabolic Fictions (1975)
- Randolph Cranstone and the Glass Thimble: A Parabolic Fiction (1977)
- The Double Ego: An Autocollage (1985)
- The Man With Flowers Through His Hands: Fables (1985)
- Randolph Cranstone and the Veil of Maya: A Fable (1986)
- The Story of Noire (1987)
- Randolph Cranstone Takes the Inward Path followed by Escape to Columbine (1988)
- The Burning Chapel (1991)
- The Invulnerable Ovoid Aura and Other Stories (1992)
- The Walled Garden: A Fantasia (1992)
- Voices of the River: A Rhapsody (1995)

=== Plays ===
- Not to Hong Kong (1972)
- The Island Abode of Bliss (1972)
- The Coats (1975)
- Sokotra: A Play in Three Acts (1997)

=== Selected translations ===
- Ingeborg Bachmann: The Thirtieth Year
- Marcel Béalu: The Water Spider
- Joseph Breitbach: Report on Bruno
- André Carpentier: Bread of the Birds
- André Carpentier: The Conqueror's Night
- Walter Erben: Marc Chagall
- Max Frisch: The Fire Raisers
- Max Frisch: I'm Not Stiller
- Max Frisch: Homo Faber
- Max Frisch: Andorra
- Max Frisch: A Wilderness of Mirrors (reprinted as Gantenbein)
- Dr. Paul Hermann: Conquest By Man (German Sieben vorbei und acht verweht) 1955
- Fritz Hochwälder: The Raspberry Picker
- E. T. A. Hoffmann: The Tales of Hoffmann
- Willibald Klinke: Kant for Everyman
- Siegfried Lenz: The Lightship
- Michel Tremblay: Stories for Late Night Drinkers
- Michel Tremblay: The City in the Egg
- Wilhelm Worringer: Abstraction And Empathy
