= Malina (novel) =

Book by Ingeborg Bachmann

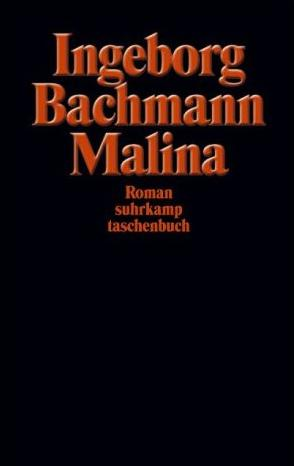
- Book cover
- Author: Ingeborg Bachmann
- Translator: Philip Boehm
- Language: German
- Publisher: Suhrkamp Verlag
- Publication date: 1971
- Publication place: Germany
- English publication date: 1990
- Pages: 355

Malina is a 1971 novel by the Austrian writer Ingeborg Bachmann. It tells the story of a female writer and her relationships with two different men, one joyous and one introverted. The text deals with themes including gender relations, guilt, mental illness, writing, and collective and personal trauma in the context of post-Second World War Vienna. The book was adapted into a 1991 film with the same title, directed by Werner Schroeter from a screenplay by Bachmann's compatriot Elfriede Jelinek. In 2026, it was adapted into an opera by librettist Tina Hartmann and composers Peter Gilbert and Karola Obermueller.

== Plot ==
The novel focuses on an unnamed female narrator, known only as I., who explores her existential situation as a woman and writer both through personal reflection and in dialogue form. She is a writer and intellectual living in Vienna during the second half of the 20th century.

The writer shares a flat with the calm and rational Malina, a historian, who offers her the necessary support as she is often confused and seems to be losing touch with reality. She meets Ivan, a young Hungarian man, and falls in love with him. They begin an affair but soon Ivan begins to avoid her and ultimately rejects her.

The second chapter, "The Third Man", is the climax of the narrative. In dream sequences the narrator remembers the horrors of the Second World War, gas chambers and rape. A “father” figure is omnipresent in her dreams who she realises represents not her own father but rather the male-dominated world of Nazism more broadly.

In the third chapter, "From last things", the narrator tries to overcome her problems in dialogue with the always proper but scarcely approachable Malina. The narrator realizes that a relationship with Ivan is not possible, and that a relationship with any other man will not be possible either. She feels that she can no longer survive in this male-dominated world. "I have lived in Ivan and I die in Malina," she says. At the end of the novel, the writer disappears without a trace into a crack in the wall and Malina removes all evidence of her existence from their flat, as if she had never been there at all. The novel closes with the sentence "It was murder."

== Reception ==
The book was reviewed in Publishers Weekly in 1991: "This demanding work contains flashes of great beauty and insight but is ultimately marred by Bachmann's cryptic, fragmented prose and internalized story line that is based entirely on the narrator's emotional responses to events conveyed only obliquely to the reader. Part of the problem derives from the veiled yet critical references to Austrian history, which are satisfactorily explained only in the excellent afterword."

The novel has also been described as a response, at least partially, to Max Frisch's 1964 novel Mein Name sei Gantenbein.

== See also ==
- 1971 in literature
- Austrian literature
