= Creative Persons =

- Genre: Biography
- Country of origin: Canada
- Original language: English
- No. of seasons: 1
- No. of episodes: 13

Production
- Executive producers: Allan King; Roger Graef
- Running time: 30 minutes
- Production company: Allan King Associates

Original release
- Network: Bayerischer Rundfunk; BBC; CBC Television; National Educational Television
- Release: 3 July – 25 September 1968

Creative Persons is a biographical television series that was co-produced by broadcasters in Canada, Germany, the United Kingdom and the United States.

== Premise ==
This series was produced by Allan King Associates with support from BR (Germany), BBC (United Kingdom), CBC (Canada) and NET (United States). Each episode featured a particular person in the field of art or design.

== Scheduling ==
This half-hour series was broadcast in Canada on CBC Television Wednesdays at 9:00 p.m. (Eastern) from 3 July to 25 September 1968.

== Episodes ==
- "Who is Maurice Béjart?" (choreographer) – Roger Graef director
- "Who is Pierre Boulez?" (composer) – Roger Graef director
- "Who is Max Frisch?" (architect, novelist, playwright) – William Brayne director
- "Who is Walter Gropius?" (architect) – Roger Graef director
- "Who is James Jones?" (author) – Allan King director
- "Who is Sean Kenny?" (designer) – William Brayne director
- "Who is Jacques Lipchitz?" (sculptor) – Roger Graef director
- "Who is Norman Mailer?" (writer)
- "Who is Oscar Niemeyer?" (architect) – William Brayne director
- "Who is Sonny Rollins?" (musician) – Dick Fontaine director
- "Who is Richard Smith?" (painter) – Denis Postle director
- "Who is Rufino Tamayo?" (painter) – Roger Graef director
- "Who is Victor Vasarely?" (painter)
