= Switzerland without an Army? A Palaver =

1989 prose dialogue by Max Frisch about the Swiss army

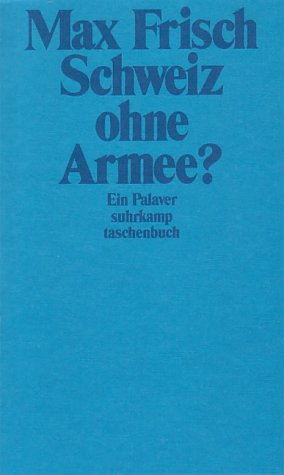
Schweiz ohne Armee? Ein Palaver. Cover of the 1992 Suhrkamp edition.

Switzerland without an Army? A Palaver (German: Schweiz ohne Armee? Ein Palaver) is a prose text in dialogue form by the Swiss writer Max Frisch, published in 1989. It was adapted for the stage under the title Jonas and His Veteran and premiered on 19 October 1989 at the Schauspielhaus Zürich, directed by Benno Besson. The work was written in the context of a campaign to abolish the Swiss Armed Forces, led by the Group for a Switzerland without an Army. In the form of a palaver between an unnamed grandfather, who is equipped with details from Frisch's own biography, and his grandson Jonas, the sense and nonsense of the Swiss army, the state and future of Swiss society, and the prospects of the popular vote are discussed.

With Switzerland without an Army?, Frisch continued his critical examination of Switzerland and its historical special status, which he had conducted in numerous texts. He once again addressed his own military service as a gunner during the Second World War, which he had treated in a largely patriotic and uncritical manner in Blätter aus dem Brotsack (1940), while he had revised this attitude in his later work Dienstbüchlein (1974). Although Frisch's it is considered to be of little literary significance and the stage adaptation received a sceptical reception from theatre critics, Switzerland without an Army? became a political issue in his home country. Frisch once again found himself at the centre of public debates that revolved around his person, the performance of the play, and the film Palaver, Palaver that accompanied its creation. Switzerland without an Army? is Frisch's last extensive text.

== Plot ==
Jonas visits his grandfather. He tells him about the upcoming popular vote on the abolition of the army. The grandfather considers this news a joke. Unlike his grandson, although critical of the military and the prevailing conditions in Switzerland, he cannot imagine a Switzerland without an army. The grandson pulls a book from the shelf that the grandfather once wrote and which he finds "casual": Max Frisch's Dienstbüchlein. From it, he quotes critical passages about Swiss self-perception and its army.

The grandfather recounts his own experiences during the Second World War in an artillery unit on the Mutschellen. For him, the Swiss army's area of operation is not external but internal. The cadres of Swiss society are identical to the cadres of its army. The popular vote merely serves the belief that it is a democracy protected by the army. Then he declaims Gottfried Benn, Bertolt Brecht, and Ingeborg Bachmann. He lists five reasons why the army is indispensable for Switzerland: the army is needed as a "school of life", as a "school of manhood", as a "school of the nation", as a "bodyguard" for the ruling "plutocracy", and as a tradition for Swiss self-confidence, namely that they have a military like everyone else.

Jonas is alienated by the old values his grandfather insists upon. He is interested in computer science and wants to study in California. He finds patriotism merely annoying, including his grandfather's. In his view, the army teaches only one thing: grovelling. Instead, he wishes for civilian service in Switzerland. The popular vote is important to him as a call for a future peace policy. But in the end, he cannot persuade his grandfather to go to the polls. The grandfather argues that he always finds himself in the minority at the ballot box. By staying away from the vote, he becomes part of the majority. After Jonas leaves, the grandfather, left alone, quotes the conclusion of the Dienstbüchlein: he did not dare to think what was thinkable; he preferred to believe rather than to know. He throws the book into the fireplace and concludes: one is quite cowardly.

== Form and Interpretation ==
Switzerland without an Army? is structured as a pure dialogue between Jonas and his grandfather. The mostly single-line narrative insertions, with their concise, sober descriptions, resemble the stage directions of a play. Passages from Frisch's Dienstbüchlein are inserted in italics into the text. In 26 longer annotations, Frisch comments on the dialogue and provides background information on names or facts.

Jürgen H. Petersen judged that the text resembles a feature rather than a drama, "clearly follows no aesthetic concept, makes no poetic claims, and can only be understood with difficulty as a fictional text." The plot leaves room for only a few playful elements, such as lighting the fireplace or drinking a bottle of wine. The clearly critical orientation of the text is in the foreground. A coherent constellation of characters is dispensed with, as both dialogue partners are essentially of the same opinion. The grandfather's objections to preserving the army seem like playful irony; the dialogue becomes a monologue, a "pamphlet with distributed roles".

In the dialogue between Jonas and his grandfather, according to Walter Schmitz, co-editor of Frisch's Collected Works, Max Frisch resumed the poetics of questioning from his second diary Tagebuch 1966–1971, where it appeared, among other places, in repeated questionnaires addressed to the reader. The question "Are you sure?" was already a core question at that time. Only seemingly is the dialogue between grandson and grandfather private; in fact, Frisch creates a public sphere through the conversation of the generations. Frisch himself, the old, famous writer, faces the questions of a young generation. The dialogue becomes a Socratic dialogue with an enlightening intent. With the publicly made private conversation, Frisch postulates a political existence that does not separate private and public life. Only through the political existence of the citizens would an "other Switzerland", a "living and future Switzerland" be possible.

According to Schmitz, Frisch's critique of Switzerland is also based on a critique of language: "in addition, not all of us mean the same Switzerland..." Already in Andorra, Frisch had thematized the determination of reality by the Andorrans in a model of Switzerland. In Switzerland without an Army? as well, it is certain for many citizens what "a proper Swiss does not do". Frisch wants to counter the official public language, which determines reality through fixed templates, with an open, living dialogue. To do this, he uses questions as well as the alienated use of quotations, which thereby questions their own content.

The final gesture of the grandfather, who throws his earlier Dienstbüchlein "lightly" into the fire of the fireplace, has been interpreted in various ways: First, Frisch is actually burning his Swiss Dienstbüchlein, his Swiss army ID, in a gesture similar to how some Americans demonstratively burned their draft notices for the Vietnam War. Second, Frisch ultimately acknowledges, in a gesture of resignation, the insignificance of what he once wrote for a younger generation. Third, Frisch proclaims the revision of the earlier text, which has lost its topicality and must be adapted to the current truth.

Walter Schmitz also saw in the fire a sign of transience, an image that runs through Frisch's work. History extends beyond the grandfather's lifetime. He is not the actual main character of the play, but Jonas, whose name refers to the Swiss film Jonas, who will be 25 years old in the year 2000. He stands for the future, which will occur without the grandfather. In the end, the grandfather burns his experience and thus deprives it of its universal validity. He does not give it to the future generation as an answer, but as a question, and thus enables the continuation of the process of enlightenment as an ongoing palaver, a conversation without fixed certainties.

== Genesis ==
After the publication of his last story Blaubart in 1982, Frisch had largely given up his writing activities. In a speech given at the 1985 Solothurn Literature Festival titled At the End of Enlightenment Stands the Golden Calf, he announced that he had "stopped writing. Tired, yes. Used up." In Switzerland without an Army? as well, Frisch had the grandson ask: "Is it true, Grandfather, that you don't write anything anymore? Apart from letters. I mean: no novels and so on, no diary?" In the figure of the grandfather, Frisch answered: "That's been true for years."

When the Group for a Switzerland without an Army formed in the mid-1980s, an initiative aimed at abolishing the Swiss army that achieved a popular vote scheduled for 26 November 1989 on its request, Frisch initially viewed the cause with scepticism. Although himself a critic of Swiss politics and its army for years, he feared a heavy defeat for the initiative in the vote, which would have put army critics on the defensive in the long term. Only when he became aware of the growing support that the initiative particularly enjoyed among the younger generation did Frisch change his mind. He broke his writer's abstinence and wrote Switzerland without an Army? A Palaver within a few weeks in February and March 1989. However, Frisch revised the text in some places even after the first edition, for example in the reasons that, from the grandfather's perspective, speak for the Swiss army, as well as in his statement that he had not written anything for a long time. Frisch dedicated his book to the enlighteners Denis Diderot and Ulrich Bräker "in gratitude".

== Reception ==
Switzerland without an Army? A Palaver met with strong interest from the Swiss population upon its publication in the summer of 1989. The first edition of the book, published in Switzerland's four national languages, sold out within a few days. The Swiss press also addressed Frisch's new work, mostly focusing on the domestic political debate in connection with the popular initiative to abolish the army. For the SonntagsBlick, Max Frisch left no doubt as to how he stood regarding the army. "Anger" had "caused Frisch to break his silence, to write again." In the Tages-Anzeiger, Stefan Howald saw in the text a "gesture of decisive old-age radicalism" as well as a "compendium of solid anti-army arguments". Stefan Keller found in the Wochenzeitung "a completely resigned Max Frisch" staging himself. Nevertheless, in the end a utopia takes shape "through the enumeration of all that is wrong." For the Neue Zürcher Zeitung, Frisch's text went beyond the initiative to abolish the army. It expresses an "overall critique, and not only of Swiss conditions", but is "designed so that the presumed outcome of the vote will prove him right."

The literary assessments of Frisch's prose text remained more restrained. Jürgen H. Petersen saw in Switzerland without an Army? a "barely poetic text" that "hardly counts among the literarily significant works of Max Frisch." Instead, it documents "the drying up of its author's literary power". Volker Hage, on the other hand, discovered in the text "the fine barbs," "the unobtrusive power of questioning," and judged that "it is Frisch's art to keep this small dialogue seemingly without intention in suspense. Pauses and digressions are more eloquent than what the two say to each other, and small nuances, tiny shifts say more than all the wisdom."

== Stage adaptation and controversies ==
In collaboration with Max Frisch, Benno Besson adapted Switzerland without an Army? for the stage under the title Jonas and His Veteran and directed the deliberately simple production, which premiered on 19 October 1989 at the Schauspielhaus Zürich. The French-language version, produced in co-production with the Théâtre Vidy-Lausanne, followed on 20 October in Zurich. One week later, the ensembles performed in reverse order in Lausanne. On 24 October, the French version was performed there, followed by the German version on 25 October.

The premiere, which Max Frisch attended in the audience, was celebrated with ovations. However, it received a sceptical reception from theatre critics. For Reinhard Baumgart, "everything was played cleanly and diligently as if from the page" without the text coming to life. The production reduces it "to its bare content, the theatre to a staged reading, the cat-and-mouse game between veteran and grandson to a political talk show for two people." Nevertheless, the audience celebrated Frisch at the end "for his courage to confess." In the German-language premiere, Jürgen Cziesla played the grandfather and Marcus Kaloff played Jonas. Peter Bollag as prompter spoke the book's annotations. In the French-language premiere, Paul Darzac, Mathieu Delmonté, and Jean-Charles Fontana performed.

In the run-up, the performance of Jonas and His Veteran had to overcome considerable hurdles. Although the director of the Zurich Schauspielhaus, Achim Benning, supported the production, parts of the board of directors tried to prevent the performance, as it would be an "unlawful political interference by the theatre in the voting campaign" of the GSoA initiative. Frisch commented on the quarrels with the statement: "That's how you learn how freedom of art works here. We don't need censorship." As a result of the theatre performances, there were confrontations with army supporters, which also found expression in anonymous phone calls and abusive letters against Max Frisch. In a public discussion after a performance, former Federal Councillor Rudolf Friedrich voiced harsh criticism of the play and its author: "Jonas and His Veteran [...] is a wordy, but it is an equally shallow chatter. It is polemic, suspicion, rumour, ridicule, sarcasm down to banal primitiveness. There appears an old, a spent, tired and resigned Max Frisch who has allowed himself to be harnessed to a strange cart. A once great mind has become a small one. His intellectual decline is demonstrated. Max Frisch is not factually, but he is mentally finished."

== Film and popular vote ==
The documentary film Palaver, Palaver – eine Schweizer Herbstchronik by Alexander J. Seiler, which documented the genesis of Jonas and His Veteran and placed it in relation to the voting campaign leading up to the popular decision, also faced resistance during its production. Zurich National Councillor Ernst Cincera suspected that "the content aims to support the initiators [of the popular vote]" and submitted a question as to why the film was financially supported by the Federal Office of Culture. The question was rejected with reference to artistic freedom. The film was released in cinemas in September 1990, after the popular vote had already passed, a fact that Peter Bichsel welcomed, as the film documents and does not agitate and has become "a representation of our handling of politics, of opposition, of self-evidence." The Lexikon des Internationalen Films commented: "The complex work, thanks to subtle montage, documents a democratic and artistic process and conveys the political climate in a Switzerland that has been set in motion by the public discourse on a question previously considered taboo."

On 26 November 1989, 35.6% of voters, over one million eligible voters, voted for the abolition of the army. The result meant a "huge surprise" for the initially sceptical Frisch. He had himself intervened in the election campaign at the last moment, giving a speech at the Basel Theatre on 20 November under the title Peace Contradicts Our Society, in which he already considered the mere fact that the army had come up for discussion as a political success. On a voting poster designed by his friend Gottfried Honegger and financed by Frisch, he added a subsequent dialogue to his original prose text: the grandson's question "How will you vote, Grandfather?" he now answered with a large "Yes".

Walter Schmitz concluded that in Switzerland without an Army?, Frisch "quite unpretentiously, without lively gesture, showed how the individual, with his insight, should contribute to the formation of public opinion in a democratic process: with careful, 'insecure' examination of the arguments; with a sense of possibility and memory; in the consciousness of subjectivity, partiality, and the existential bindingness of one's own truth," the whole "under the horizon of utopian hope."

== Editions ==
- Max Frisch: Schweiz ohne Armee? Ein Palaver. Limmat, Zurich 1989, ISBN 3-85791-153-0 (first edition).
- Suisse sans armée? Un palabre (translated by Benno Besson and Yvette Z'Graggen). Campiche, Yvonand 1989, ISBN 2-88241-012-3 (French).
- Svizzera senza esercito? Una chiacchierata rituale (translated by Danilo Bianchi). Casagrande, Bellinzona 1989, ISBN 88-7713-017-2 (Italian).
- Max Frisch: Schweiz ohne Armee? Ein Palaver. Suhrkamp-TB 1881, Frankfurt am Main 1992, ISBN 3-518-38381-7.

== See also ==
- Schauspielshaus Zurich
- Federal Office of Culture

== Bibliography ==
- Bircher, Urs (1997). Vom langsamen Wachsen eines Zorns: Max Frisch 1911–1955 [Of the Slow Growth of Anger: Max Frisch 1911–1955]. Zürich: Limmat. ISBN 3-85791-286-3.
- Bircher, Urs (2000). Mit Ausnahme der Freundschaft: Max Frisch 1956–1991 [With the Exception of Friendship: Max Frisch 1956–1991]. Zürich: Limmat. ISBN 3-85791-297-9.
- Hage, Volker (1997). Max Frisch. rororo. Vol. 50616. Reinbek bei Hamburg: Rowohlt. ISBN 3-499-50616-5.
- Petersen, Jürgen H. (2002). Max Frisch. Stuttgart: Metzler. ISBN 3-476-13173-4.
- Schmitz, Walter (1992). "Max Frischs 'Palaver' Schweiz ohne Armee? Oder Öffentlichkeit und Unverständnis" [Max Frisch's 'Palaver' Switzerland without an Army? Or Public Sphere and Incomprehension]. In de Vin, Daniel (ed.). Leben gefällt mir. Begegnung mit Max Frisch [I Like Life: Encounters with Max Frisch]. Brüssel: Literarischer Treffpunkt. pp. 59–80. ISBN 90-6828-003-1.
