= Kurt Hirschfeld =

German theater director and dramaturg

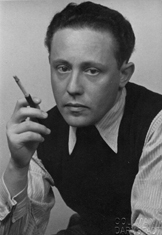
- Kurt Hirschfeld
- Born: 10 March 1902; Lehrte
- Died: 8 November 1964 (aged 62)
- Occupations: Theater Director and Dramaturg
- Known for: Artistic leadership of Schauspielhaus Zürich

Kurt Hirschfeld (born 10 March 1902 in Lehrte, Germany; died 8 November 1964 in Zurich) was a German theater director and dramaturg in Zurich.

== Life and career ==
Kurt Hirschfeld was born on 10 March 1902 in Lehrte, Lower Saxony, Germany to the Jewish merchant Hermann Hirschfeld (1871–1941) and his wife Selma Zierl (1877–1926), the daughter of a rabbi.

After completing primary school in Lehrte, Hirschfeld transferred in 1914 to the Realgymnasium on Aegidientorplatz in Hannover, where he composed poetry and essays.

He studied philosophy, sociology, German, and art history in Heidelberg, Frankfurt am Main, and Göttingen. Beginning in 1930, he worked as a dramaturg at the Hessischen Landestheater Darmstadt. He made his directorial debut with Erich Kästners Leben in dieser Zeit.

He was dismissed from this post after the Nazis came to power in March, 1933. He received a job offer from Ferdinand Rieser, director of the Pfauenbühne in Zurich and emigrated to Switzerland, where he transformed the provincial stage into one of the most important German-language theaters outside Germany.

In 1934, he was dismissed from his post after differences with Rieser and spent time working in a publishing house. In 1935, he traveled to Moscow as a correspondent for the Neue Zürcher Zeitung, where he also worked briefly as a directorial assistant for Vsevolod Meyerhold. After the dissolution of Meyerhold's theater, he returned to Zurich, where he helped to found the "Neues Schauspiel AG", which became the legal successor to the Schauspielhaus in Zurich. He served as the new company's first dramaturg and became its vice director in 1946. In 1961, he became the artistic and managing director of the Schauspielhaus Zurich.

== Role in German-language Drama ==
Hirschfeld was one of the discoverers and early supporters of the Swiss playwrights Max Frisch and Friedrich Dürrenmatt. He had a special interest in the dramatic works of Bertolt Brecht. Thanks to his personal friendship with Brecht, he was responsible for three premieres of Brecht's work during World War II.

== Personal life ==
In 1952, Hirschfeld married Tetta Scharff, daughter of the sculptor Edwin Scharff. A year later, his daughter Ruth was born. He died of lung cancer in a sanatorium on the Tegernsee in 1964 at the age of 62. Kurt Hirschfeld was buried in Zürich's Israelitischer Friedhof Oberer Friesenberg.

== Literature ==
- Wendy Arons: “Kurt Hirschfeld and the Visionary Internationalism of the Schauspielhaus Zürich.” Theatre Survey 60.3 (September 2019): 385-413.
- Doris Beckmann et al. (eds.): Kurt Hirschfeld, Lehrte: Stadt Lehrte 1985
- Hannes Heer; Sven Fritz; Heike Brummer; Jutta Zwilling: Verstummte Stimmen: die Vertreibung der "Juden" und "politisch Untragbaren" aus den hessischen Theatern 1933 bis 1945. Berlin: Metropol 2011 ISBN 978-3-86331-013-4, pp. 228–230
- Lexikon deutsch-jüdischer Autoren, vol. 12, Munich: Saur 2005, pp. 72–76
