= An Answer from the Silence =

1937 novel by Max Frisch

- First edition
- Author: Max Frisch
- Original title: Antwort aus der Stille
- Translator: Mike Mitchell
- Language: German
- Publisher: Deutsche Verlags-Anstalt
- Publication date: 1937
- Publication place: Germany
- English publication date: 2011
- Pages: 130

An Answer from the Silence: A Story from the Mountains (German: Antwort aus der Stille: Eine Erzählung aus den Bergen) is a 1937 novel by the Swiss writer Max Frisch. It tells the story of a young man who escapes to the Swiss Alps ten days before his wedding.

== Reception ==
The book was reviewed in Publishers Weekly in 2011: "Infused with a post-WWI despair at the human condition, Frisch (1911-1991) refused this early piece's inclusion in his collected works in the 1970s, having burned the original manuscript in the woods in 1937. It seems a pity that this earnest and unusual book, in a crisp translation by Mitchell, has been denied us until now."

== See also ==
- 1937 in literature
- Swiss literature
