= Malina (film) =

1991 German-Austrian arthouse surrealist psychological drama film by Werner Schroeter

- Film poster
- Directed by: Werner Schroeter
- Screenplay by: Elfriede Jelinek; Patricia Moraz
- Based on: Malina by Ingeborg Bachmann
- Produced by: Steffen Kuchenreuther; Thomas Kuchenreuther
- Starring: Isabelle Huppert
- Cinematography: Elfi Mikesch
- Edited by: Juliane Lorenz
- Release date: 17 January 1991
- Running time: 125 minutes
- Countries: Germany; Austria
- Languages: French; German

Malina is a 1991 German-Austrian avant-garde arthouse surrealist psychological drama film directed by Werner Schroeter. The screenplay was adapted by Elfriede Jelinek from Ingeborg Bachmann's 1971 novel Malina. The film was entered into the 1991 Cannes Film Festival. Starring French actress Isabelle Huppert.

== Cast ==
- Isabelle Huppert - The Woman
- Mathieu Carrière - Malina
- Can Togay - Ivan
- Fritz Schediwy - Father
- Isolde Barth - Mother
- Libgart Schwarz - Frl. Jellinek
- Elisabeth Krejcir - Lina
- Peter Kern - Bulgarian
- Jenny Drivala - Opera singer
- Wiebke Frost - Sister of the Woman
- Lisa Kreuzer - Die Frau (voice)
- Lolita Chammah - The Woman in childhood
