= I'm Not Stiller =

1954 novel by Max Frisch

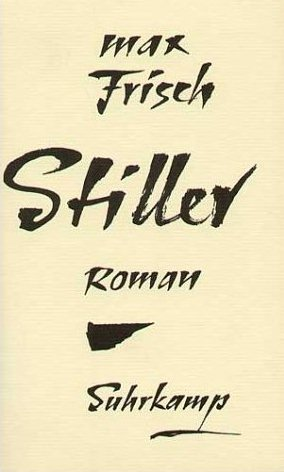
First edition

I'm Not Stiller (German title: Stiller) is a novel by Swiss author Max Frisch, which was published in 1954. The theme of the novel, the question of identity, is a recurring theme in the work of Frisch.

The narrator, travelling on an American passport in the name of James Larkin White, is arrested on arrival in Switzerland. He is accused of being the missing Swiss sculptor Anatol Ludwig Stiller, an accusation which White persistently denies. Friends and acquaintances visit and identify him as Stiller. Stiller's wife Julika Stiller-Tschudy, a former ballet dancer who now runs a dance school, travels from Paris to visit him in prison. She, too, identifies him as Stiller. Over the course of the novel, the complex histories of Stiller and White are revealed.

It was translated into English by Michael Bullock and published in an abridged version by Abelard-Schuman in 1958, and later as an unabridged edition by Methuen in 1982.
