= Gertrud Frisch-von Meyenburg =

Gertrud Anna Constance Frisch-von Meyenburg
- Born: 1916
- Died: 2009 (aged 92–93)
- Other names: Trudy
- Occupation: Architect

Gertrud Anna Constance Frisch-von Meyenburg (1916–2009) was a Swiss architect and the first wife of the writer Max Frisch.

== Life ==
Gertrud von Meyenburg was the daughter of the eminent pathologist Hanns von Meyenburg. Her childhood was passed in Lausanne, Zürich und Herrliberg.

Like her elder brother, she studied architecture at the prestigious Federal Technical Institute in Zürich ("Eidgenössische Technische Hochschule Zürich"). In 1939 she undertook a one-year internship with an architectural firm in Rome where she worked with old town houses in the wider context of urban regeneration. Returning to Zürich, she received her diploma in 1940.

While at university she got to know Max Frisch, known in retrospect as a writer, but at that time a fellow student of architecture. The two of them were married on 30 June 1942, and in due course the marriage produced three children: Ursula Priess-Frisch (1943), Hans Peter Frisch (1944) and Charlotte Frisch (1949). Ursula would publish, in 2009, a literary "reappraisal" of her difficult relationship with her famous father.

After 1954 Max Frisch lived apart from his family, and in 1959 the couple divorced. Trudy Frisch-von Meyenburg returned to the architectural profession, working as a free-lancer, One of her most important commissions is the little school house in the Zürich district of Auzelg (1973). She also contributed to the reconstruction of old manor houses in the area of the "Longo Maï cooperative" in France.
