= Man in the Holocene =

1979 novella by Max Frisch

- First edition
- Author: Max Frisch
- Original title: Der Mensch erscheint im Holozän
- Language: German
- Publisher: Suhrkamp Verlag; Mariner Books
- Publication date: 1979
- Publication place: Switzerland
- ISBN: 0-15-656952-3

Man in the Holocene (1979) is a novella by Swiss author Max Frisch, originally published in German in 1979, and in English in The New Yorker on May 19, 1980 (trans. Geoffrey Skelton). A distinctive feature of this book's style is the use of reprinted cutouts which the protagonist, Mr. Geiser, removes from several encyclopedias, the bible and other books. It contains some autobiographical elements: Frisch at the time of the writing is about the same age as the protagonist, Mr. Geiser, and Frisch also had a house in the Tessin valley where the story is set.

== Plot summary ==
The 74-year-old Mr. Geiser is bored in his Ticinese house during torrential rains. He is so bored that he tries to make a pagoda out of crispbread and categorizes thunder types into a taxonomy (rolling thunders, banging thunders etc.). His sole companion is his cat as his wife had died not long ago.

There is a report of a landslide caused by the deluge, cutting off the valley. Fearing a large slide that would bury the village and man's knowledge, Geiser reads in his encyclopedia, the Bible, and history books. At first he makes notes and tacks them to the walls; later he cuts paragraphs from the books and tapes them instead, noting sadly that the front sides of the encyclopedia's pages are visible, but the back sides unfortunately are dissected and destroyed.

Despite the weather, he hikes outdoors along diverging paths. While wandering, he notes his physical limits, and the limits of man's knowledge and importance.

He notes man's insignificance and meaninglessness (man's appearance in the Holocene era is a very recent event in evolutionary terms). The old man is exposed to the cycle of life and his mortality.

Geiser has to admit that „der Mensch bleibt ein Laie“ (man remains an amateur). He slowly loses his memory. He wonders if memory was necessary – "the rocks do not need my memory or not". Towards the end, Geiser suffers cerebral apoplexy that attacks his memory.

== Critical reception ==
The New York Times Book Review included Man in the Holocene in its list of Best Books of 1980. The principal review was written by George Stade and appeared June 22, 1980. The review concluded "I should also mention that, as far as I can tell, this luminous parable of indeterminate purport is also a masterpiece."

Novelist Michael Magras said:

Frisch’s philosophical masterwork, a chillingly beautiful portrait of a man who is surrounded by erosion, nature’s and his own, and who struggles for one last moment of clarity in which to make sense of himself and of civilization. Holocene reminds you of the extraordinary cruelty of human existence, and of its stubborn durability. Life may be as fragile and ridiculous as a pagoda made of crispbread, yet it’s also strong enough to withstand epochs of extinction. No matter how hard we try otherwise, we’re still here.

Man in the Holocene was voted into the 20-volume "Schweizer Bibliothek" ('Swiss Library') of the weekly Swiss magazine Das Magazin in 2005, representing the 20 best Swiss titles of the 20th century.

== Film adaptation ==
Heinz Bütler and Manfred Eicher directed a 1992 film adaptation. Erland Josephson interprets the main role of Mr. Geiser, and Sophie Duez the role of Mr. Geiser's daughter Corinne.
