= Montauk (novel) =

1975 novel by Max Frisch

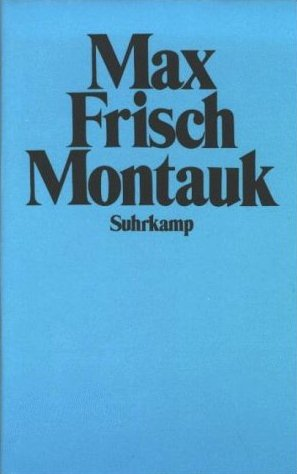
First edition (publ. Suhrkamp Verlag)

Montauk is a story by Swiss writer Max Frisch. It first appeared in 1975 and takes an exceptional position in Frisch's work. While fictional stories previously served Frisch for exploring the possible behavior of his protagonists, in Montauk, he tells an authentic experience: a weekend which he spent with a young woman in Montauk on the American East Coast. The short-run love affair is used by Frisch as a retrospective on his own biography. In line with Philip Roth he tells his "life as a man", relates to the women with whom he was associated, and the failure of their relationship. Further reflections apply to the author's age and his near-death and the mutual influence of life and work. Also, the story is about the emergence of Montauk: in contrast to his previous work Frisch describes his decision to document this weekend's direct experience without adding anything. Montauk met with strongly polarized reception. When faced by the open descriptions of their past, former partners of Frisch felt duped. Some readers were embarrassed by Frisch's self-exposure. Other critics hailed the story as his most important work and praised the achievement to make a literary masterpiece of his own life. Marcel Reich-Ranicki adopted Montauk in his Canon of German literature. The 2017 film Return to Montauk by Volker Schlöndorff and Colm Tóibín was inspired by the novel.

== Contents ==
The frame story of the narrative describes the Montauk weekend of 11 and 12 May 1974, that ends a book-signing tour of the narrator, the literary image of his author Max Frisch, through the United States. Two days later, one day before his 63rd birthday, Frisch's return to Europe is scheduled. At his side is Lynn, a 30-year-old publisher employee who is signed to serve him throughout the trip, but has not read one line from the author's work. On their last weekend Lynn and Frisch come closer together and take a trip to Long Island, New York, to the village of Montauk on the Atlantic coast. For the author this weekend sparks the desire to describe the shared days, without any addition. The presence of Lynn triggers reflections and memories in Frisch. He ponders on age and his growing feeling to be an imposition for others, his success and its effect on enviers, admirers and women. Frisch discloses intimate details of his life, the death of his mother, his impotence and four abortions of three women. The author also reflects on his work, ranging from the parallel work being a young architect on one side and as author of theatre plays on the other up to the always the same questions his later novels triggered on press conferences. Frisch is dissatisfied with his stories, which he merely wrote serving the audience, but concealed large parts of his own life, and downright betrayed himself. In a lengthy episode Frisch recalls his childhood friend and benefactor W., who dominated throughout their friendship. With Frisch's successes and the inability of his friend to accept him as a writer their friendship ended, which in retrospect Frisch regards as disastrous. In another episode he reveals his inability to deal with a paralyzed neighbour, who turns out to be his first love.

Above all, Frisch's former consorts are in center of the narrative. Lynn triggers memories of her predecessors, starting with the Jewish Käte, the real model of Hanna from Homo faber, Frisch's second wife Marianne who lives separately from him (but whom he still loves), to the relationship with Ingeborg Bachmann shaped by dependency and jealousy. With death looming, Frisch wants no woman to be tied to his lack of future. He wishes Lynn to be the last woman in his life. It is clear to both of them that their relationship will be limited to this one weekend, and they do not want to stay in touch afterwards.

At the end of the story Lynn and Frisch part in New York with a "Bye". At the intersection of First Avenue and 46th Street Frisch gazes after Lynn who does not turn around.

== Biographical background ==
In April 1974 Frisch traveled to the United States, to receive honorary membership of the Academy of Arts and Letters and the National Institute of Arts and Letters. On this occasion, his American publisher Helen Wolff organized a book-signing tour for Frisch. She put to his side the young Alice Locke-Carey who in Montauk was named Lynn. Except this name changing the facts of Frisch's stay in America do concur.

Shortened only is the name of his friend of youth W., the art collector Werner Coninx, whose collection is now presented in the Coninx-Museum. Although the story largely discloses its autobiographical background claiming authenticity over fiction it stays open whether this story is a roman à clef. Some critics stressed that it would be a misunderstanding to read Montauk a kind of key narrative to understand his live and work. Some see the Max Frisch from Montauk, however, as an "art piece", whose desires finally did not produce sincerity but a beautiful story. From his secrets Frisch has disclosed nothing.

The question of truth and falsehood is made a subject of discussion in Montauk itself, as the story abruptly jumps from He– to I–form: "He looks, to check whether his tenderness really refers to Lynn ... Or lie I here?" Elsewhere Frisch makes Lynn exclaim: "Max, you are a liar." Unlike in Montauk the real affair between Frisch and Locke-Carey had an aftermath. After Frisch researched in vain at a following U.S. tour for that young woman, she herself called the author after the release of the American translation of Montauk in the summer of 1976. After the divorce of Frisch's second marriage in 1979 he met Locke-Carey again in May 1980. From that point on Frisch and Locke-Carey lived together a few years alternately in New York and Berzona.

== Literature ==
- Montauk (May 1978) by Max Frisch, Harcourt Brace Jovanovich, 148 pages, ISBN 978-0-15-661990-5
