= Gantenbein =

Book by Max Frisch

- First edition
- Author: Max Frisch
- Original title: Mein Name sei Gantenbein
- Translator: Michael Bullock
- Language: German
- Publisher: Suhrkamp Verlag
- Publication date: 1964
- Publication place: Germany
- English publication date: 1965
- Pages: 495

Mein Name sei Gantenbein (roughly "[Let] my name be Gantenbein") is a 1964 novel by the Swiss writer Max Frisch. It was translated into English in 1965 by Michael Bullock as A Wilderness of Mirrors; this translation was later reprinted under the title Gantenbein in 1982. The novel features a narrator who recounts a multitude of dislocated, fragmented stories, which together reveal certain traits and patterns.

== Plot ==
Abandoned by his wife, the narrator sits in an empty apartment with covered furniture. He says he has had an experience and is now searching for the story that goes with it. He tries on stories like clothes. Each “I” that speaks, he says, is only a role; every person invents for themselves the story they take to be their life. As an example, he tells of the milkman who goes mad because his identity has worn out and he cannot come up with a new one, and of the self-styled unlucky fellow who would rather lose his lottery winnings than change his self-image.

He invents a man named Theo Gantenbein, who is at risk of going blind after a car accident. When his bandages are removed, he can see, but he now plays the role of the blind man. Equipped with a white cane and dark glasses, he no longer has to respond to the world as it is, no longer has to acknowledge what he sees. Since no one fears his control or judgment anymore, his popularity and social standing grow.

When Gantenbein steps in front of a car driven by a woman named Camilla Huber, he does not have to recognize her as a prostitute. The blind man visits her regularly for manicures and tells her “true” stories. He tells her about the man who receives his own obituary and attends his own funeral. He tells her the fairy tale of the shepherd Ali and his blind wife Alil. Camilla realizes that Gantenbein is not blind, but she promises to keep silent if he also keeps silent about her. A dentist wishes to marry her, but on the eve of the wedding she is murdered. The accusation falls on a well-known personality, already disgraced by the publication of letters addressed to Camilla. Gantenbein, summoned as a witness in court, had seen the accused at the time of the crime, but he withholds the alibi in order not to give up his blind role.

The narrator also invents other figures: Felix Enderlin and František Svoboda. Enderlin, unexpectedly offered a post at Harvard but also convinced he is terminally ill, is incapable of playing a role and fears nothing more than repetition and monotony. When he meets a woman, he already knows in advance how the relationship will unfold. Svoboda, a towering Bohemian whose wife Lila begins an affair with Enderlin, travels alone and waits stoically for her decision—whether she will live by his side, by the other’s, or alone.

All three men cross paths in their connection to a woman named Lila, an actress loved by all three. Gantenbein compares his relationship with her to that of Philemon and Baucis. At first, both are happy. As a blind man, he need not notice her infidelity, and Lila need not pretend in front of him. She overlooks every sign that he can see. Yet the hints of her unfaithfulness weigh on him more and more.

The relationship between Gantenbein and Lila could end when a young acting student visits her—whom Gantenbein takes for his rival—and he locks him in the bedroom with Lila, after which she refuses to live with a madman. Lila might also have a daughter, but Gantenbein is tormented by the suspicion that a certain Mr. Siebenhagen is the father. When he finally confesses to Lila that he has been able to see all along, she feels betrayed and rejects him.

In the end, the narrator tells Camilla a story about a man from Zurich who wanted to die without leaving behind a name or a story. The dead man almost succeeded in drifting nameless down the Limmat River in his coffin. Facing his own death, the narrator is interrogated by a voice asking which of his characters he himself has been. When he returns to the present, it seems to him as though none of it had really happened. He sits beneath the late summer sun of the south, enjoying life.

== Themes ==
Literature professor Michael Butler, in his essay "Identity and authenticity in postwar Swiss and Austrian novels", wrote that Gantenbein marks a different direction in Frisch's writing, as it "possesses a postmodern playfulness" instead of "the serious irony of its predecessors". Butler wrote: "Scepticism towards the traditional claim of language to structure the world is now seen not as a threat to identity but as liberating the ego from premature restriction. The very creativity involved in constructing stories that can be on 'like clothes' is itself perceived as evidence of an authentic connection with life. ... What appeared to begin as a postmodern exercise in narrative irony turns into the acknowledgement that happiness can only be won within the confines of empirical reality."

== Writing process ==
In a 1964 self-reflective text, Frisch explained his approach to narrative structure in Gantenbein. He wrote that the aim was "to show the reality of an individual by having him appear as a blank patch outlined by the sum of fictional entities congruent with his personality. ... The story is not told as if an individual could be identified by his factual behaviour; let him betray himself in his fictions."

== See also ==
- 1964 in literature
- Swiss literature
