= Homo Faber (novel) =

1957 novel by Max Frisch

Homo Faber: A Report
- First edition of English translation book cover, 1959
- Author: Max Frisch
- Original title: Homo faber. Ein Bericht
- Translator: Michael Bullock
- Cover artist: Colin Spencer
- Language: English
- Genre: Novel
- Publisher: Suhrkamp Verlag (original), Abelard-Schuman (English translation)
- Publication date: 1957
- Publication place: Switzerland
- English publication date: 1959
- Media type: Print, 8vo
- Pages: 198
- OCLC: 877183876

Homo Faber: A Report (German: Homo faber. Ein Bericht) is a novel by Swiss author Max Frisch, first published in Germany in 1957. An English translation by Michael Bullock was published in Britain in 1959. The novel is written as a first-person narrative. The protagonist, Walter Faber, is a successful engineer traveling throughout Europe and the Americas on behalf of UNESCO. His world view based on logic, probability, and technology is challenged by a series of incredible coincidences as his repressed past and chance occurrences come together to break up his severely rational, technically oriented ideology.

== Plot ==
=== Part One: First Stop ===
In Caracas in early summer 1957, Walter Faber compiles a report on the events of the previous few months. On a flight from New York to Mexico, his plane had made a forced landing in the desert. During the following stay he met a German man, Herbert, who turns out to be the brother of Joachim, Faber's friend. Faber had not heard from his friend since 1936. Faber decides to accompany Herbert, who is on his way to visit his brother. After an odyssey through the wilderness, they reach Joachim's plantation. But Joachim has hanged himself. Herbert decides to stay behind and manage the plantation.

Throughout this part of the report, Faber intersperses his memories of the 1930s, when he worked at the Swiss Federal Institute of Technology Zurich (ETH Zurich) and met the art student Hanna. The two had become lovers, and one day Hanna revealed that she was pregnant. Faber made awkward attempts to marry her, but she was reluctant. Faber had received an offer from Escher Wyss to work in Baghdad and he accepted it; he and Hanna split up. Before his departure, Faber asked his friend Joachim to take care of Hanna and believes that Hanna has agreed to an abortion.

Faber returns from the plantation to New York City, while ultimately en route to Paris for a series of conferences, and encounters his married mistress, Ivy. Looking to escape this relationship, Faber chooses to leave earlier for Paris by taking a boat. On this journey, he meets a young woman named Sabeth, with whom he falls in love. He proposes to Sabeth at the end of the journey, but she is traveling with a male friend. Faber and Sabeth meet again in Paris and Faber decides to go on vacation and accompany Sabeth on a road trip through Europe, where they also start a sexual relationship. Faber even calls the trip their "honeymoon".

Because of a foreboding, he asks Sabeth for the name of her mother and she replies "Hanna". Faber still hopes that Hanna had proceeded with an abortion, but it soon turns out that Sabeth is his daughter. In Greece, where Hanna now lives, a poisonous snake bites Sabeth. She falls backwards after seeing Walter come naked out of the ocean, and is soon rushed to the hospital by Faber. There he meets his former love Hanna again. Luckily Sabeth survives the snakebite. However she suddenly dies due to an untreated fracture in her skull caused by the fall. Faber feels a certain measure of guilt as he had not mentioned Sabeth falling.

=== Part Two: Second Stop ===
From July 19, stricken by grief and stomach cancer, Faber writes notes from a hospital in Athens. These notes cover the period immediately after Sabeth dies, when he flies the following day to New York and then onwards to Caracas where he revisits Herbert Henke and compiles the report of Part One. He then flies back to Europe, stopping in Havana on the way. In Düsseldorf at Hencke-Bosch, he watches the films he has taken in the previous months with a technician.

At the end of the narrative, Faber is in hospital facing an operation for his stomach cancer; he has optimistically calculated the probability of his survival, and after a last entry in his notes before the operation, the book ends.

== Timeline ==
The following is based on the timeline created by Germanist scholar Klaus Müller-Salget. Since not all of the key dates listed are specifically named in the novel, but are based on back calculations, other dates can be found in other sources.

- March 25, evening: Faber's departure from New York
- March 26–29: Emergency landing and stay in the Mexican desert (Tamaulipas)
- April 1: Arrival in Campeche
- April 2–3: Train trip to Palenque
- April 7: Full Moon Festival in Palenque
- April 8–12: Drive to the plantation in Guatemala (as the crow flies approx. 70 miles)
- April 14: Start of the return journey to Palenque
- April 20: Departure from Caracas (Venezuela)
- April 21: Arrival in New York, where Ivy is waiting
- April 22–30: Boat trip from New York to Le Havre
- April 29: Faber's 50th birthday, marriage proposal to Sabeth
- May 1: Paris
- May 13: Lunar eclipse in Avignon, spends night with Sabeth
- May 14–25: Joint trip to Italy, crossing to Patras
- May 26–27: Night in Acrocorinth
- May 27, at noon: Sabeth's accident on Theodohori beach
- May 27: Arrival in Athens, reunion with Hanna
- May 28, morning to midday: Drive again to Theodohori; 2 p.m.: Sabeth's death from a cerebral hemorrhage
- June 1: New York, party at Williams'
- June 2: Flight to Mérida
- June 4–5: Trip to Palenque; continue to the plantation in Guatemala
- June 20 – July 8: Stay in Caracas; from June 21 Faber writes the first part of the report during his hotel stay due to stomach problems
- July 9–13: Faber in Havana (Cuba)
- July 15: Düsseldorf, film screening at Hencke-Bosch GmbH, departure by train
- July 16: Zurich, meeting with Professor O.
- July 18: Athens
- From July 19, hospital in Athens, where Faber wrote the second part of the report and the diary in italics
- Appointment in August at 8:05 a.m.: Operation; the recordings stop.

== Characters ==
- Walter Faber is the protagonist of Homo Faber. He is an engineer and technologist who works for UNESCO. Born and educated in Switzerland, he now lives in an apartment in New York City, but travels extensively for work throughout Europe and South America. Walter has never been married.
- Sabeth, or Elisabeth, is the 20-year-old daughter of Walter and Hanna. Born in Switzerland, she understands Joachim to be her father. She speaks English, German, and French.
- Hanna Piper (née Landsberg) is the German-born half-Jewish mother of Sabeth. Formerly Walter's lover, she married Joachim, and then later married Herr Piper. She works at an art institute in Athens, Greece.
- Joachim Henke was Walter's German born friend, who was studying to be a doctor. He married Hanna, but they separated after she refused to have any more children with him. Sabeth believes that he is her father. After separating from Hanna, Joachim joined the German army and fought in World War II; Hanna and Sabeth never saw him again. Decades later, he moved to Guatemala to run a tobacco plantation. A few weeks after arriving, he committed suicide.
- Herbert Henke is Joachim's brother, who meets Walter on a plane. He is employed by the same company that sent Joachim to Guatemala.
- Ivy is Walter's married American mistress, who comes to New York once a week to see Walter and her psychiatrist.

== Major themes ==
There are several major themes to the novel. The theme of technology as philosophy describes the belief that everything is possible and that technology allows people to control all aspects of their lives. This view is contradicted throughout the novel by events. Technical breakdowns mark key points in the story (and Walter's life) right up to the upcoming operation that he mentions at the very end, which is thus implied to result in his death.

Faber's dismissal of literature and of anything to do with myths and the arts also plays into the theme of fate versus coincidence, which is preeminent in the plot. Faber is oblivious to the various mythological motifs and twists which bring his story close to a modern tragedy, even as it unfolds in Greece and Rome of all places. Also, the events in Homo Faber are presented in such a way as to seem either a string of coincidences resulting in an unlikely outcome, or a sequence of predestined actions and decisions leading to a necessary outcome. This dichotomy is reflected in a larger series of seeming antinomies: faith or reason, modern knowledge or ancient beliefs, free will or predestination. Walter never resolves this conflict.

The theme of travel plays an important role in the novel. Using many modes of transportation, Walter is constantly on the move, visiting several continents, almost a dozen countries, and dozens of cities, for business and pleasure. This constant travel underscores Walter's sense of dislocation; he has no family, no real home, and no real country. Through travel, Walter is able to avoid permanent connections, to escape responsibilities, and to remain completely unknown and unjudged.

== Publication history ==
Homo Faber was first published in 1957 in Frankfurt, Germany by Suhrkamp Verlag. The first English edition, translated by Michael Bullock, was published in 1959 in London by Abelard-Schuman. The book has been translated into numerous languages, and has appeared in numerous editions, both in hardcover and paperback.

== Adaptations ==
The novel was made into a 1991 film, Voyager, directed by Volker Schlöndorff, and starring Sam Shepard and Julie Delpy.
