= Journey to the East =

1932 novel by Hermann Hesse

- First English-language edition
- Author: Hermann Hesse
- Original title: Die Morgenlandfahrt
- Language: German
- Genre: Bildungsroman
- Publisher: Samuel Fischer
- Publication date: 1932
- Publication place: Germany
- English publication date: 1956
- Media type: Print (Hardcover and Paperback)
- Followed by: The Glass Bead Game

Journey to the East is a short novel by German author Hermann Hesse. It was first published in German in 1932 as Die Morgenlandfahrt. This novel came directly after his biggest international success, Narcissus and Goldmund. The first English translation was published in 1956.

== Plot summary ==
Journey to the East is written from the point of view of a man (called "H. H." in the book) who becomes a member of a religious sect called "The League", whose members include famous fictional and real characters from throughout history, including Plato, Paul Klee, Don Quixote, Goldmund (from Hesse's Narcissus and Goldmund), the artist Klingsor (from Hesse's Klingsor's Last Summer), and the ferryman Vasudeva (from Hesse's Siddhartha). H. H. and other members of the League go on a pilgrimage to "the East" in search of the "ultimate Truth". Their servant, Leo, is described as happy, pleasant, handsome, beloved by everyone, and having a rapport with animals.

"The Journey" is enjoyable at first, until the travelers reach a deep mountain gorge called Morbio Inferiore, where Leo disappears. The anxious travelers argue among themselves. They accuse the absent Leo of having taken various objects which they seem to be missing (and which turn up later) and which they regard as very important (but which later turn out to be unimportant), and they blame him for the eventual disintegration of the group and failure of the Journey.

Years later, the narrator tries to write his story of the Journey, but he is unable to put together any coherent account of it; his whole life has sunk into despair and disillusionment since the failure of the one thing which was most important to him, and he has even sold the violin which he had played for the group during the Journey. Finally, at the advice of a friend, he locates the servant Leo and tries to meet him. Having failed to even be recognized by Leo when he meets him on a park bench, the narrator writes him a long, impassioned letter of "grievances, remorse and entreaty" and posts it to him that night.

The next morning, Leo appears in the narrator's home and orders him to appear before the High Throne to be judged by the officials of the League. It turns out (to the narrator's surprise) that Leo, the simple servant, is actually President of the League. The crisis in Morbio Inferiore was a test of faith which the narrator and everyone else failed rather dismally. H. H. discovers that his "aberration" and time spent adrift was part of his trial, and he is allowed to return to the League if he can pass a new test of faith and obedience. His choice brings about the final action of the book.

== See also ==
- Servant leadership
