= Camenzind =

Camenzind is a Swiss German surname, most prevalent in Switzerland.

== Notable people ==
Notable people with this surname include:

- Alberto Camenzind (1914–2004), Swiss architect
- Hans Camenzind (1934–2012), electronics engineer, famous for designing the 555 timer IC
- Oliver Camenzind (born 1972), Swiss professional footballer
- Oscar Camenzind (born 1971), Swiss cyclist
- Pascal Camenzind, stage name Camen (born 1974), Swiss soul singer and songwriter

== Fictitious characters ==
Fictitious characters with this surname include:

- Peter Camenzind, title character of a 1904 Hermann Hesse novel

== See also ==
- 30000 Camenzind, an asteroid
