= One Hour After Midnight =

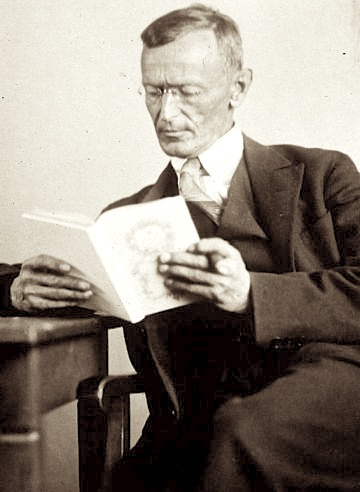
Author of One Hour After Midnight, Hermann Hesse

One Hour After Midnight (German: Eine Stunde hinter Mitternacht) is a collection of prose poetry written by the German author Hermann Hesse. First published in the year 1899, it shares its name with a poem from Hesse's earlier collection, Romantic Songs.

== History ==
An aspiring German writer and contemporary of Hesse's, Helene Voigt, encountered his poem "Grande Valse," one of his three poems inspired by the music of Chopin. Being so moved, she wrote to him a letter of appreciation, and the two established a correspondence. Several months later, Helene married an "ambitious publisher" named Eugen Diederichs, whom she implored to publish Hesse's recently completed prose collection. Eugen, out of respect for his new wife, agreed to publish a tentative 600 copies of One Hour After Midnight. The collection sold with difficulty, and an embarrassed Hesse withdrew it prematurely, refusing to reissue the work again until 1941.

== Sources ==
- Freedman, Ralph (1997). Hermann Hesse, Pilgrim of Crisis: A Biography. New York: Fromm International. ISBN 978-0-88064-172-2. OCLC 35159328.
- Hesse, Hermann (2001). Michels, Volker (ed.). Sämtliche Werke. Bd. 1: Jugendschriften (in German). Frankfurt am Main: Suhrkamp. ISBN 3518411012.
