= Castalia (disambiguation) =

Castalia is the name of a nymph in Greek and Roman mythology and a spring in Delphi named after her.

Castalia or Kastalia may also refer to:

== Places ==
- Castalia, Iowa, United States
- Castalia, Ohio, United States, a village in Erie County
- Castalia, North Carolina, United States, a town in Nash County
- Castalia, Grand Manan Island, Canada, part of the Village of Grand Manan
- Castalia, a spring at Daphne, Antioch

== Astronomy ==
- 4769 Castalia (previously known as '1989 PB'), a near-Earth asteroid discovered by Eleanor Helin in 1989; the first asteroid observed by radar
- 646 Kastalia, a Main Belt asteroid discovered by August Kopff in 1907
- The Castalia meteorite of 1874, which fell in North Carolina, United States (see meteorite falls)
- A macula of Europa.

== Music ==
- Castalia, an instrumental track in the 1979 album Solid State Survivor by Yellow Magic Orchestra
- Castalia (album), a Mark Isham album

== Other uses ==
- Castalia (bivalve), a genus of bivalves in the family Hyriidae
- Castalia, a synonym for Nymphaea, a plant genus
- Castalia (spacecraft), a proposed European Space Agency space probe
- Castalia (simulator), a wireless network simulator
- Castalia, a fictional province in Hermann Hesse's The Glass Bead Game
- PS Castalia, an experimental cross-Channel ferry which was later converted to a hospital ship
- Castalia House, a book publishing company founded by writer Vox Day

== See also ==
- Nou Estadi Castàlia, a football stadium in Castelló de la Plana, Spain
