= Sturzenegger =

Sturzenegger is a surname. It may refer to:

- A. J. Sturzenegger (1888–1949), American football and baseball player and coach
- Federico Sturzenegger (born 1966), Argentine economist
- Hans Sturzenegger (1875–1943), Swiss painter
- Paul Sturzenegger (1902–1970), Swiss association football player
