= Poems (Hesse collection) =

Collection of poems by Hermann Hesse

- First English edition
- Author: Hermann Hesse
- Original title: Die Gedichte
- Translator: James Wright
- Language: German
- Subject: Poetry
- Published: 1953 (Suhrkamp Verlag)
- Publication place: Germany
- English publication date: 1970
- Media type: Print

Poems is a collection of 31 poems written by the German author Hermann Hesse between 1899 and 1921. They were selected and translated to English by James Wright in 1970 from Die Gedichte, which was published in German in 1953. This collection was first published in 1971.

== Contents ==
Each translated poem in this volume appears alongside the original German text. The poems, and the year they were written, are:

- "I Know, You Walk" / "Ich weiß, du gehst" (1899)
- "Across the Fields ..." / "Über die Felder ..." (1902)
- "Elizabeth" / "Elisabeth" (1902)
- "Ravenna (1)" / "Ravenna (1)" (1902)
- "Ravenna (2)" / "Ravenna (2)" (1902)
- "Lonesome Night" / "Einsame Nacht" (1902)
- "A Swarm of Gnats" / "Mückenschwarm" (1911)
- "The Poet" / "Der Dichter" (1911)
- "Mountains at Night" / "Berge in der Nacht" (1911)
- "At Night on the High Seas" / "Bei Nacht" (1911)
- "To a Chinese Girl Singing" / "An eine Chinesische Sängerin" (1915)
- "Departure from the Jungle" / "Abschied vom Urwald" (1915)
- "Evil Time" / "Böse Zeit" (1911)
- "On a Journey" / "Auf Wanderung" (1911)
- "Night" / "Wohl Lieb ich die Finstre Nacht" (1911)
- "Destiny" / "Schicksal" (1911)
- "Ode to Hölderlin" / "Ode an Hölderlin" (1911)
- "Childhood" / "Die Kindheit" (1915)
- "Lying in Grass" / "Im Grase Liegend" (1915)
- "How Heavy the Days ..." / "Wie Sind die Tage ..." (1911)
- "In a Collection of Egyptian Sculptures" / "In einer Sammlung Ägyptischer Bildwerke" (1915)
- "Without You" / "Ohne Dich" (1915)
- "The First Flowers" / "Die Ersten Blumen" (1915)
- "Spring Day" / "Frühlingstag" (1915)
- "Holiday Music in the Evening" / "Feierliche Abendmusik" (1911)
- "Thinking of a Friend at Night" / "Denken an den Freund bei Nacht" (1915)
- "Autumn Day" / "Herbsttag" (1915)
- "To Children" / "Den Kindern" (1915)
- "Flowers, Too" / "Auch die Blumen" (1911)
- "Uneasiness in the Night" / "Angst in der Nacht" (1911)
- "All Deaths" / "Alle Tode" (1921)

== Background ==
Hermann Hesse is best known for his novels, but he was also a poet. In the seven volume German edition of his works, there are some 480 pages of poems. Hesse's novels themselves contain many passages of literal verse.

The common thread that runs through the poems in this collection is homesickness. On the selection of these poems, James Wright wrote in the Translator's Note: "All I wish to do is to offer a selection of Hesse's poems which deal with the single theme of homesickness." Many of Hesse's novels touched on this subject, including Steppenwolf (1927):

Towards the end of the novel, Hermine says to Harry: "… Ah, Harry, we have to stumble through so much dirt and humbug before we reach home. And we have no one to guide us. Our only guide is our homesickness."

In these poems Hesse has touched this theme with a "traditionally endearing delicacy."
