= Ninon Hesse =

Ukrainian art historian (1895–1966)

Ninon Hesse (née Ausländer; 18 September 1895 – 22 September 1966) was an art historian and Hermann Hesse's third wife.

Ninon Ausländer was born to a Jewish lawyer in Czernowitz, Ukraine and studied archaeology, art history and medicine in Vienna, Austria. In 1918, she married caricaturist B. F. Dolbin, whom she left in 1920; the official divorce only took place in 1931.

Although she had written a letter to Hesse after reading his novel Peter Camenzind in 1910, she only met him in 1922. She met him again at Zürich in the winter of 1926 and the pair cultivated a close relationship when they returned to the city a year later. The two lived together from 1927 and married in November 1931. They lived in Casa Bodmer at Montagnola.

Ninon Hesse played an important role in Hermann Hesse's life not only as the love of his life, but also as she helped him to continue with his work when his eyes got weak by reading to him and writing for him, and collecting and editing his writings and letters after his death in 1962. It was Ninon, for example, who transcribed her husband's letters and family documents dating to Hermann's early years, particularly from his studies at Basel Knabenhaus. She also maintained that her husband's works were not to be filmed as this was his will.
