= Peter Camenzind =

1904 novel by Hermann Hesse

- 1913 edition
- Author: Hermann Hesse
- Original title: Peter Camenzind
- Language: German
- Publisher: Samuel Fischer
- Publication date: 1904
- Publication place: Germany
- Media type: Print (hardback & paperback)
- Followed by: Beneath the Wheel

Peter Camenzind, published in 1904, is the first novel by Hermann Hesse. It contains a number of themes that were to preoccupy the author in many of his later works, most notably the individual's search for a unique spiritual and physical identity amidst the backdrops of nature and modern civilization, and the role of art in the formation of personal identity.

== Plot ==
The novel begins with the phrase "In the beginning was the myth. God, in his search for self-expression, invested the souls of Hindus, Greeks, and Germans with poetic shapes and continues to invest each child's soul with poetry every day." The novel is purely poetical, and its protagonist in time aspires to become a poet who invests the lives of men with reality in its most beautiful of forms. Peter Camenzind easily reminds one of Hesse's other protagonists, i.e. Siddhartha, Goldmund, and Harry Haller. Like them, he suffers deeply and undergoes many intellectual, physical, and spiritual journeys. In the course of his many journeys, he will come to experience the diverse landscapes of Germany, Italy, France, and Switzerland, as well as the wide range of emotions that humans exhibit at different stages in their lives. In a later stage of his life, he will embody the ideal of St. Francis as he cares for a crippled man, from whom he gains as much as he gives.

Peter Camenzind, as a youth, leaves his mountain village with a great ambition to experience the world and to become one of its denizens. Having experienced the loss of his mother at an early age, and with a desire to leave behind a callous father, he heads to university. As he progresses through his studies, he meets and falls in love with the painter, Erminia Aglietti and becomes a close friend to a young pianist named Richard. Greatly saddened because of the latter's death, he takes up wandering to soak up the diverse experiences of life.

Ever faced with the vicissitudes of life, he continually takes up alcohol as a means to confront the harshness and inexplicable strangeness of life. He also meets and falls in love with Elizabeth, even though she will later marry another man. However, his journey through Italy changes him in many respects and enhances his ability to love life and see beauty within all things. Only when he becomes friends with Boppi, a man with a physical disability, does he truly experience what it means to love another human being. In time, he comes to see in Boppi a wonderful reflection of humanity in its noblest form, and the two forge an indelible friendship. After Boppi dies, Peter Camenzind returns to his village and takes care of his aging father, even as he plans out the completion of his life's great work.

== See also ==
- Bildungsroman
