= Narcissus and Goldmund (film) =

2020 film

- Theatrical release poster
- Directed by: Stefan Ruzowitzky
- Based on: Narcissus and Goldmund by Hermann Hesse
- Starring: Sabin Tambrea; Jannis Niewöhner
- Cinematography: Benedict Neuenfels
- Edited by: Britta Nahler
- Music by: Henning Fuchs
- Production companies: Deutsche Columbia Pictures Filmproduktion; Mythos Film Produktions; Tempest Film; Lotus Film
- Distributed by: Sony Pictures Releasing GmbH
- Release date: 2 March 2020
- Running time: 118 minutes
- Country: Germany
- Language: German
- Box office: $233,325

Narcissus and Goldmund (German: Narziss und Goldmund) is a 2020 German drama film loosely based on the eponymous novel by Hermann Hesse.

== Cast ==
- Sabin Tambrea as Mönch Narziss
- Jannis Niewöhner as Goldmund
- Emilia Schüle as Lydia
- Uwe Ochsenknecht as Meister Niklaus
- Henriette Confurius as Lene
