= Fred Haines =

American screenwriter

- Born: February 27, 1936; Los Angeles, California, U.S.
- Died: May 4, 2008 (aged 72)
- Education: Columbia University; University of Arizona; University of California, Berkeley
- Occupations: Screenwriter; film director
- Spouse(s): Dede Wright (divorced 1961); Frances McCormack (divorced 2000)
- Children: 2

Fred Haines (February 27, 1936 – May 4, 2008) was an American screenwriter and film director.

== Early life ==
Haines was born in Los Angeles in 1936, and later moved to Tucson, Arizona with his family. He joined the U.S. Navy in 1953 during the Korean War, and served until 1956 when he received an honorable discharge. While in the Navy, he had married Dede Wright, the daughter of his commanding Admiral, although they divorced in 1961 after having two children.

== Film career ==
After leaving the military, Haines studied literature at Columbia University and the University of Arizona before receiving his degree from the University of California, Berkeley. He got a job at KPFA, where he met film director Joseph Strick through film critic Pauline Kael. Strick was impressed with Haines' intellectual curiosity and film knowledge, and got him a job in the writing department at Columbia Pictures.

Strick obtained the film rights to the James Joyce novel Ulysses, and brought Haines on board as co-writer and associate producer for the film, with Strick directing. Ulysses was released in 1967, and was praised for its faithfulness to Joyce's novel, receiving a nomination for Best Adapted Screenplay at the 1967 Academy Awards. While filming Ulysses in Ireland, Haines met his second wife, Frances McCormack.

Haines continued to work closely with Strick, although he requested his name be taken off the credits for Strick's 1970 adaptation of Henry Miller's Tropic of Cancer after a disagreement between the pair. Haines spent the early 1970s trying to arrange funding for his proposed adaptation of Hermann Hesse's novel Steppenwolf. The film version was released in 1974, with Haines directing the film himself.

When McCormack fell ill with multiple sclerosis, Haines and his wife moved to Ireland to be closer to her family and the Irish health care system. The couple lived in a rented apartment in the house of writer Constantine Fitzgibbon on the outskirts of Dublin, and Haines worked as a script editor for the Irish broadcaster RTÉ and helped to run Stage One, a fringe theatre company with fellow American expatriate writer Douglas Kennedy.

== Later life ==
By 1984, money troubles prompted Haines and McCormack to return to Los Angeles. Their marriage ended in 2000, and Haines later lived next door to his son Sean in Venice Beach until he died aged 72 on May 4, 2008, due to complications from lung cancer.
