= Rosshalde =

1914 novel by Hermann Hesse

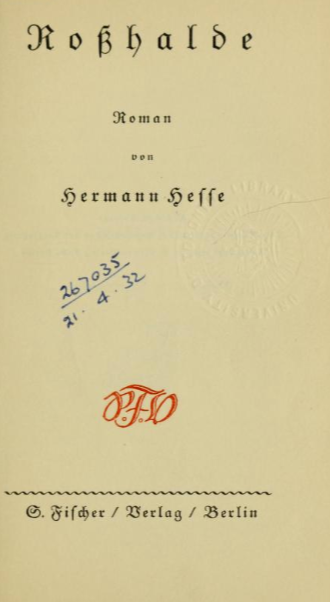
- Title page for Rosshalde (1914)
- Author: Hermann Hesse
- Translator: E. I. Carlyle (1925); Ralph Manheim (1970)
- Language: German
- Genre: novel
- Publication date: 1914

Rosshalde is a short novel by the German author Hermann Hesse.

== Summary ==
Rosshalde deals with the failed marriage of the protagonist, painter Johann Veraguth and his wife Adele. The couple has two sons. The elder son moved away for college, and their younger son, Pierre, lives with them on their estate, Rosshalde. The couple, however, do not live together; Adele lives in the main house with Pierre, while Johann lives in a small house next to them. Pierre is the only thing which links Johann and Adele, and when he becomes very ill, the couple becomes somewhat closer.
