= Steppenwolf (film) =

1974 film

- Directed by: Fred Haines
- Written by: Fred Haines
- Based on: Steppenwolf by Hermann Hesse
- Produced by: Melvin Fishman; Richard Herlan
- Starring: Max von Sydow; Dominique Sanda; Pierre Clementi
- Edited by: Irving Lerner
- Music by: George Gruntz
- Production companies: D-R Films; ProduFilm Gmbh
- Distributed by: Design Research
- Release dates: December 18, 1974 (LA & NYC)
- Running time: 105 minutes
- Countries: Switzerland; United States
- Language: English

Steppenwolf is a 1974 film adaptation of Hermann Hesse's 1927 novel Steppenwolf, directed by Fred Haines. The film made heavy use of visual special effects that were cutting-edge at the time of its release. It follows the adventures of a half-man, half-animal individual named Harry Haller, who in the Germany of the 1920s, is depressed, resentful of his middle class station, and wants to die not knowing the world around him. He then meets two strange people who introduce him to life and a bizarre world called the "Magic Theater".

== Cast ==
- Max von Sydow as Harry Haller
- Dominique Sanda as Hermine
- Pierre Clementi as Pablo
- Carla Romanelli as Maria
- Roy Bosier as Aztec
- Alfred Baillou as Johann Wolfgang von Goethe
- Niels-Peter Rudolph as Gustav
- Helmut Förnbacher as Franz
- Charles Regnier as Loering
- Eduard Linkers as Mr. Hefte
- Silvia Reize as Dora
- Judith Mellies as Rosa O`Flynn
- Helen Hesse as Frau Hefte

Cast notes:

- Helen Hesse was Hermann Hesse's granddaughter. Hesse's daughter-in-law, Ida, worked as a still photographer on the set.

== Production ==
The film took seven years of complicated pre-production because its producers, Melvin Abner Fishman and Richard Herland – a student of Jung and alchemy – wanted the film to be "the first Jungian film" and built up relationships with the Hesse family that allowed the film rights of the book to be released. Herland raised the finances.

Directors Michelangelo Antonioni and John Frankenheimer, as well as the actor James Coburn were all touted to direct the film. In the end, the film was directed by its screenwriter, Fred Haines.

Although Walter Matthau, Jack Lemmon and Timothy Leary were all proposed as playing the main role of Harry Haller, the role eventually went to Max von Sydow. Although the film was made in English, none of the principal actors were native English speakers.

Steppenwolf was filmed on location in Basel, Switzerland, Wiesbaden, Germany, and at Studio Hamburg in Germany.

Finally, the rights to the finished film were entirely given over to Peter Sprague, its financier. A "marketing disaster" followed, which included the colour of the prints coming out incorrectly. For decades the film remained little seen except for brief runs in art film houses. Because they were not content with the way the 2 films based on Hesse's novels (the other being "Siddhartha") came out, the rights were never given for any of his other novels to be translated to screen.

== Reception ==
After a festival screening, a review in the Los Angeles Free Press found the film "beautifully shot, well-acted, but only partly successful", attributing this to the difficulty in translating to the screen Hesse's "stream-of-consciousness, interior writing" style. The reviewer, Jacoba Atlas, highlighted "one of the finest 'dream' sequences ever put on film [...] using every cinematic technique from step-printing to chromatic negatives".

Upon the film's release on home video, Bernard Holland wrote of it in The New York Times:

This film adaptation of the Herman Hesse novel is one of those plunges into the "meaning-of-life" genre that still might excite the college freshman with intellectual pretensions but one whose excesses will seem a little silly—or boring—to most of the rest of us. Its good-versus-evil thesis is expounded through a variety of surreal effects—including animated cartoons. Hesse's philosophical thinking—often obvious on the printed page—translates even less forcefully to film. Mr. von Sydow is reasonably tortured as the straddler of innocence and depravity and Miss Sanda exudes a hard, shallow beauty as his seductive counterpart.
