= Marie Hesse =

Missionary wife, teacher and author (1842–1902)

- Born: Marie Gundert; 18 October 1842; Tellicherry, India
- Died: 24 February 1902 (aged 59); Calw, Württemberg
- Other name: Marie Isenberg
- Occupations: Teacher; author
- Spouses: Charles Isenberg (m. 1865; died 1870); Johannes Hesse (m. 1874)
- Children: 9, including Hermann Hesse
- Parent(s): Hermann Gundert; Julie Dubois

Marie Hesse, born Marie Gundert and known during her first marriage as Marie Isenberg (18 October 1842 – 24 February 1902), was a missionary wife in India, a teacher, and an author. She was the mother of the writer Hermann Hesse.

== Early life and education ==
Marie Gundert spent the first four years of her life at Tellicherry on the Malabar Coast of India. Her father, Hermann Gundert, a Württemberg theologian and scholar of Malayalam, was among the first missionaries of the Basel Mission in southern India; her mother, Julie Gundert née Dubois, came from a family of winegrowers at Corcelles in the canton of Neuchâtel and taught reading, writing, and handicrafts to Indian girls. Marie had seven siblings, two of whom died in infancy.

In 1846 her parents brought her and her elder siblings to Europe for their schooling, as was usual for the children of Basel Mission families. She lived for four years with the Ostertag family in the Gundeldingen district of Basel, and then for two years at the girls' institute of the Pietist community of Korntal in Württemberg, where her education rested on compulsion, obedience, drill, and a rigorous piety, and her interest in art and secular literature was not tolerated. She then took her first steps in working life at Corcelles, her mother's birthplace, as a nursemaid in a teacher's family.

At the age of 15 she returned to her family in India. During the voyage she fell in love with an Englishman, but her parents rejected his proposal of marriage on religious grounds. She taught English, geography, and handicrafts at the girls' school her mother directed at Calicut, while helping her father with his translations. In 1859 her father returned to Calw in Württemberg because of ill health, becoming a collaborator and then director of the Calwer publishing house; Marie and her mother followed a year later. Her diaries show that she regarded India as her true homeland.

== Marriage and work in India ==
In 1865 Marie Gundert returned to India to marry the German-British missionary Charles Isenberg, a distant acquaintance of her father. The couple had three sons, one of whom died in infancy. The family lived at Hyderabad, where Marie Isenberg founded a girls' school that struggled, especially at first, to attract pupils. As a missionary's wife—the Basel Mission used the feminine term Missionarin only for unmarried women working for the mission, which itself became possible only at the beginning of the 20th century—she maintained many contacts with the local, mainly Muslim population, whom she described in her letters as proud and beautiful.

In 1870 the family had to leave India after Charles Isenberg contracted pulmonary tuberculosis; he died after their return to Württemberg. Marie Isenberg moved with her children to her parents' home at Calw, and from 1871 worked as a teacher of English at the town's Realschule, becoming the first woman in Württemberg to teach at a public secondary school. After declining an offer from the Basel Mission to study medicine in order to practise in India, she married the former missionary Johannes Hesse, from Reval, in 1874. He had ended his stay in India for reasons of health and worked at the Calwer publishing house, which he took over after the death of Hermann Gundert. With her second husband she had six more children, among them the writer Hermann Hesse.

== Writing ==
Marie Hesse assisted her husband in his work as a publisher. She contributed to missionary journals and published several texts on her life in India, on her mother Julie Gundert, and on the missionaries David Livingstone and James Hannington. She also composed poems and published translations. Her writings are steeped in Pietist religiosity but also attest to an interest in secular questions and condemn slavery.

== Works ==
- Jakob Hannington. Ein Märtyrer für Uganda, 1891
- David Livingstone, der Freund Afrikas, 1892

== Bibliography ==
- A. Gundert, Marie Hesse: Ein Lebensbild in Briefen und Tagebüchern, 1934 (7th ed. 1996)
- D. Konrad, Missionsbräute. Pietistinnen des 19. Jahrhunderts in der Basler Mission, 2001 (4th ed. 2013)
- D. Konrad, Missionskinder. Migration und Trennung in Missionarsfamilien der Basler Mission des 19. Jahrhunderts, 2023
