= Demian =

1919 book by Hermann Hesse

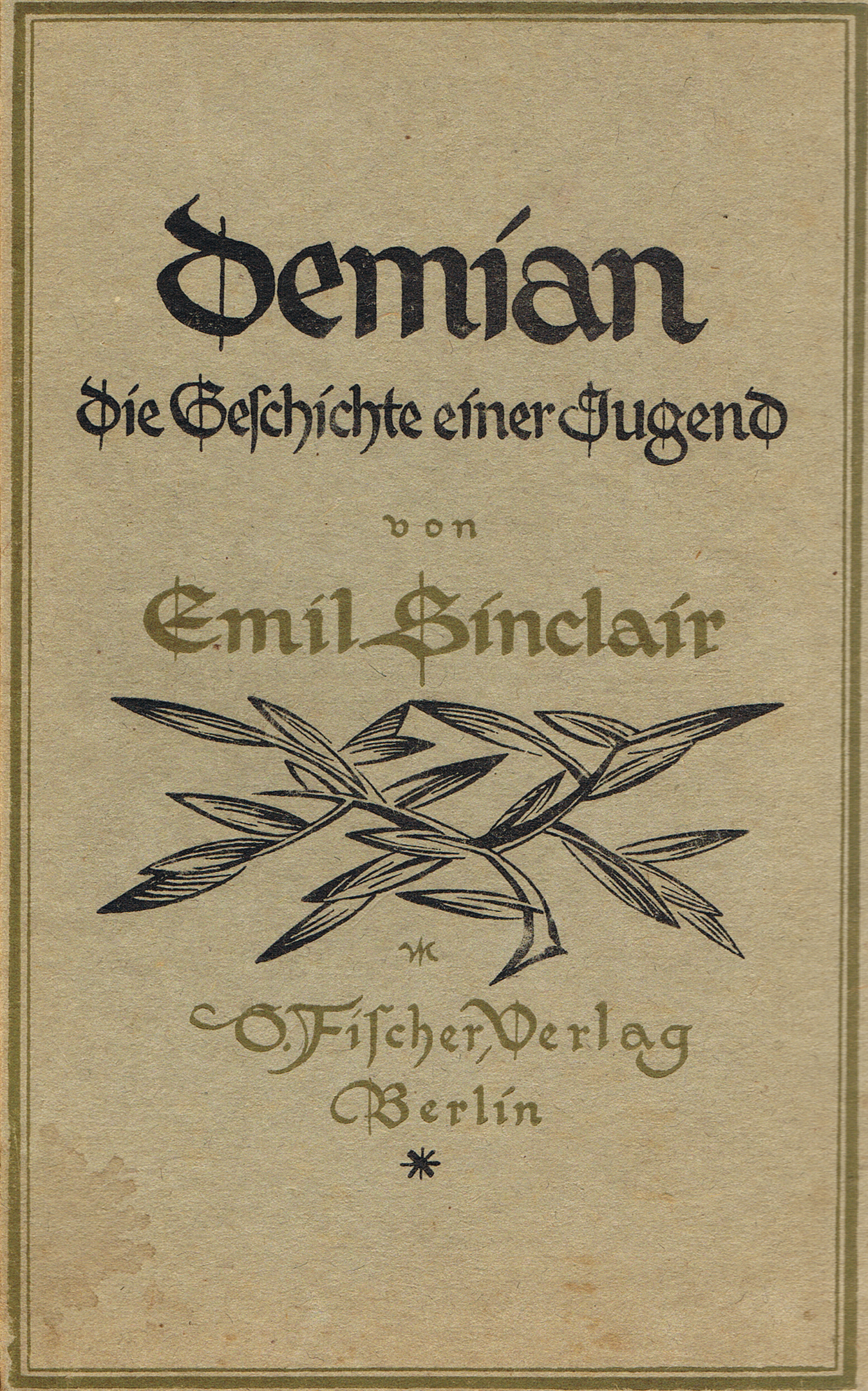
- First edition (German)
- Author: Hermann Hesse
- Original title: Demian: Die Geschichte Einer Jugend
- Translator: N. H. Priday
- Language: German
- Publisher: Fischer Verlag
- Publication date: 1919
- Publication place: Germany
- English publication date: 1923
- Media type: Print (hardback & paperback)
- Pages: 390 pp (1962 English edition, paperback)
- ISBN: 0-06-093191-4 (first English edition, paperback)
- OCLC: 40739012
- Dewey Decimal: 833/.912 21
- LC Class: PT2617.E85 D413 1999

Demian: The Story of a Boyhood is a bildungsroman by Hermann Hesse, published in 1919. Demian was first published under the pseudonym "Emil Sinclair," the name of the narrator of the story, but Hesse was later revealed to be the author. The tenth edition was the first to bear Hesse's name, and the title was changed to Demian: The Story of Emil Sinclair’s Youth.

== Plot ==
Emil Sinclair is a young boy raised in a middle-class home, amidst what is described as a Scheinwelt, a composite word meaning "world of illusion," so his entire existence can be summarized as a struggle between two worlds: the show world of illusion (related to the Hindu concept of maya) and the real world, the world of spiritual truth (see Plato's cave and dualism).

The story's turning point occurs when he meets the mysterious youth, Max Demian. Demian reinterprets the biblical story of Cain and Abel in a completely new way, viewing Cain as a fearless strong man rather than an evil one. This subversion of existing values profoundly shakes Sinclair's worldview and begins his journey of self-discovery. Under Demian's influence, Sinclair starts to realize that his world doesn't just have a bright side; there is also a real world.

In preparatory school, he meets Beatrice and the organist Pistorius. The latter further inspires Sinclair to determine his own path and create his life, rather than relying on external standards.

As Sinclair enters college, he starts reading the works of Friedrich Nietzsche and is deeply influenced. Ultimately, Sinclair awakens into a realization of self: that to truly find his own way, he must abandon all his guides, including Demian.

== Chapters ==
1. Two Worlds
2. Cain
3. The Thief
4. Beatrice
5. The Bird Fights Its Way Out of the Egg
6. Jacob Wrestling
7. Eva
8. Beginning of the End

== Characters ==
- Emil Sinclair is the protagonist of the novel. Sinclair is confused as to what his life is and is going to be, and constantly seeks mentorship throughout the novel. He tends to need validation from an older figure, and finds mentors in characters such as Demian, Pistorius, and Eva.
- Sinclair's mother and father are the symbols of safety toward which Sinclair first finds refuge, but against whom he eventually rebels.
- Franz Kromer is a neighborhood bully whose psychological torture leads Sinclair to befriend Demian.
- Max Demian is a childhood friend and a mentor of Sinclair. Demian leads Sinclair to his eventual self-realization, and may be considered Sinclair's daemon.
- Frau Eva is Max Demian's mother. She steadily becomes Sinclair's ideal characterization in life, first in his pictures and visions, then in person. She plays a powerful, matriarchal role in their spiritual circle, and Sinclair likens her to "the mother of all being"; cf. Genesis 3:20, in which Eve—Eva in German—is named "the mother of all the living".
- Pistorius is a theology student dropout, an organist who plays during off hours at a local church, and a temporary mentor for Sinclair. Pistorius teaches Sinclair how to look inside himself for spiritual guidance.
- Alfons Beck is the "affable" and "avuncular" oldest boy at the boarding house where Sinclair enrolls after his confirmation. Beck serves as a minor mentor to Sinclair, and introduces Sinclair to the joys and pitfalls of alcohol.
- Knauer is a spiritually and sexually frustrated fellow student whose plan to commit suicide prompts Sinclair—in a reversal of roles—to act as a mentor for the first time.

== Jungian influence ==
Since at least 1914, if not 1909, Hesse had been encountering the newly growing field of psychoanalysis as it moved through the German intellectual circles. During the 1910s, Hesse felt that the psychological difficulties that had tormented him since youth needed to be dealt with through psychotherapy. In 1916–17 he underwent psychoanalytic treatment with Josef Lang, a disciple of Carl Jung. Through his contact with Lang and later, in 1921, from being psychoanalyzed by Jung, Hesse became very interested in Jungian analysis and interpretation. Demian is replete with both Jungian archetypes and Jungian symbolism. In addition, psychoanalysis helped Hesse identify psychological problems which he had experienced in his youth, including internal tension caused by a conflict between his own carnal instincts and the strict moralism of his parents. Such themes appear throughout Demian as semi-autobiographical reflections upon Hesse's own exploration of Jungian philosophy.

== Themes and symbols ==
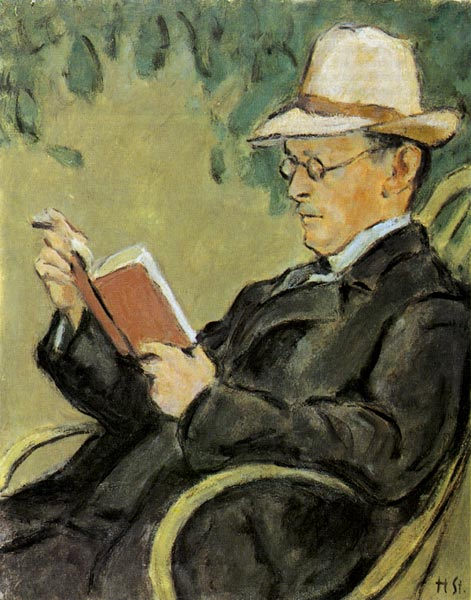
Portrait of Hesse (Hans Sturzenegger, 1912)

=== Embracing duality ===
One of the major themes is the existence of opposing forces and the idea that both are necessary.

=== Spiritual enlightenment ===
The novel refers to the idea of Gnosticism, particularly the god Abraxas, showing the influence of Carl Jung's psychology. According to Hesse, the novel is a story of Jungian individuation, the process of opening up to one's unconsciousness.

=== Women in Demian ===
In the Jungian interpretation of Demian, women do not play a vital role but instead are used as feminine symbols. At the beginning, Sinclair looks up to his sisters and mother, and even his house maid. While at school, he sees a beautiful woman whom he calls Beatrice, and towards the end of the novel, when Sinclair is an adolescent man, he discovers Demian's mother, Frau Eva. These women have less significant roles in the story, and Hesse uses them primarily as symbolic facets of the depths of Sinclair's mind.

=== The God Abraxas ===
The Gnostic deity Abraxas is used as a symbol throughout the text, idealizing the interdependence of all that is good and evil in the world. Demian argues that Jehovah, the Judeo-Christian God, is only one face of God; it rules over all that is wholesome, but there is another half of the world, and an infinite god must encompass both sides of this world. The symbol of Abraxas appears as a bird breaking free from an egg or a globe.

== Commentary ==
Thomas Mann wrote an introduction to the book in 1947.

== English translations ==
- N. H. Priday (New York: Boni & Liveright, 1923)
- W. J. Strachan (London: Peter Owen, 1958)
- Michael Roloff & Michael Lebeck (New York: Harper & Row, 1965)
- Stanley Appelbaum (Mineola, NY: Dover Publications, 2000)
- Damion Searls (New York: Penguin, 2013)
- N. H. Priday and Aldwin Grey (Midden, 2025)
