= Gertrud (novel) =

1910 novel by Hermann Hesse

Gertrude
- Author: Hermann Hesse
- Original title: Gertrud
- Translator: Hilda Rosner
- Language: German
- Genre: Philosophical novel
- Publisher: Albert Langen
- Publication date: 1910
- Publication place: Germany
- English publication date: 1955
- Media type: Print (hardback & paperback)
- OCLC: 1845263

Gertrud is a novel written by Hermann Hesse, first published in book form in October 1910 by Albert Langen. It had been previously published from September to November 1909 in the magazine Velhagen & Klasings Monatshefte. Peter Owen Publishers, London, published the book in English.

== Plot summary ==
Styled as the memoir of a famous composer named Kuhn, Gertrud tells of his childhood and young adult years before it comes to the heart of the story; his relationships to two troubled artists, the eponymous Gertrud Imthor, and the opera singer Heinrich Muoth. Kuhn is drawn to Gertrud upon their first encounter, but she falls in love with and marries Muoth, whom the composer befriended as well some years before. The two are hopelessly ill-matched, and their destructive relationship provides the basis for Kuhn's magnum opus.

== Analysis ==
Like many of Hesse's novels, there is a strong influence derived from Nietzsche, specifically his work The Birth of Tragedy. Muoth represents the passionate Dionysian elements of art, while Gertrud represents the more refined Apollonian elements. The fact that Kuhn's opera is the result of their relationship suggests the combining of the two elements to form a work of high art.
