= Narcissus and Goldmund =

1930 novel by Hermann Hesse

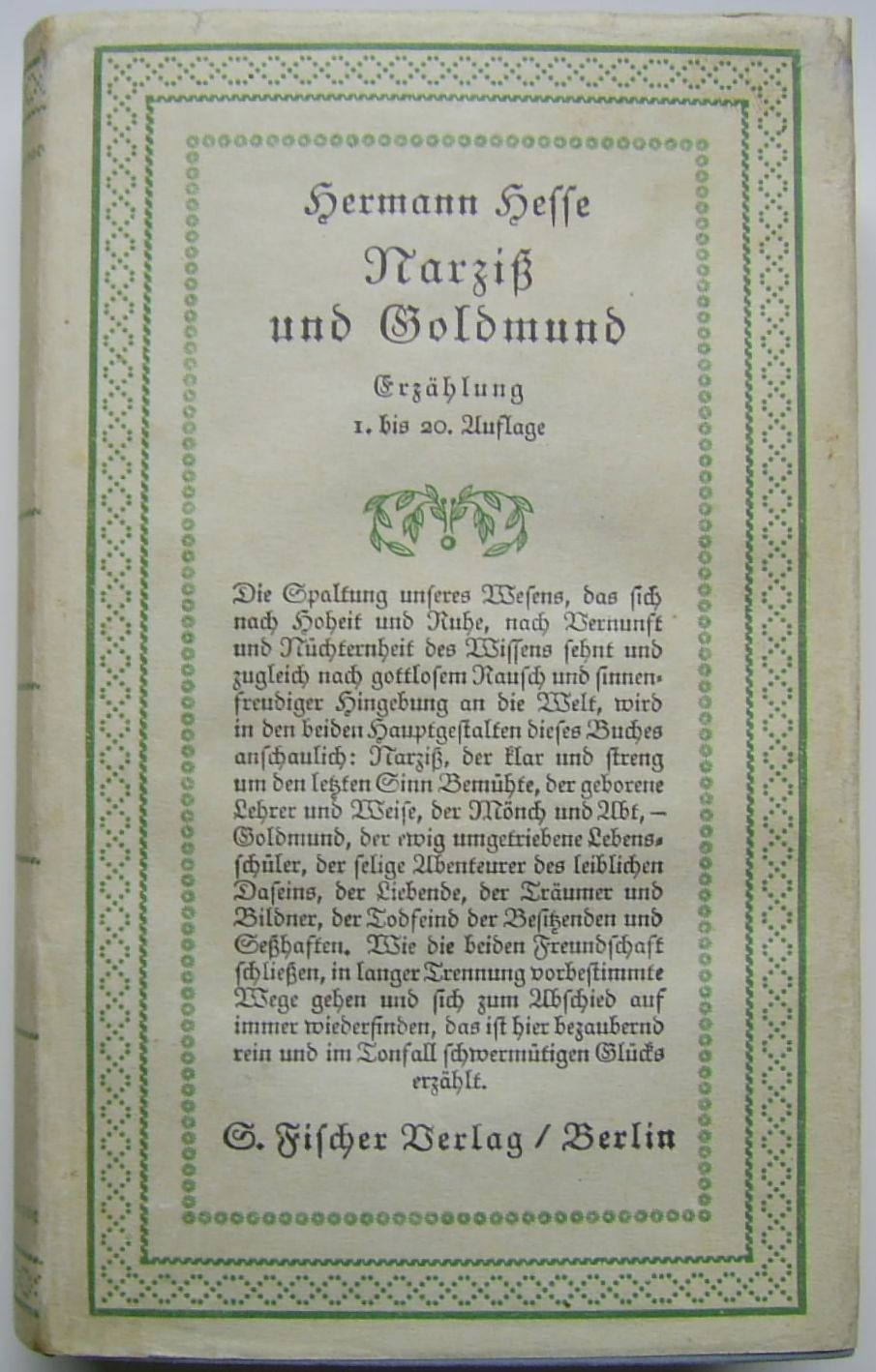
- Author: Hermann Hesse
- Original title: Narziß und Goldmund
- Translator: 1932 Geoffrey Dunlop; 1968 Ursule Molinaro
- Language: German
- Genre: historical fiction, philosophical fiction
- Publisher: Fischer Verlag
- Publication date: 1930
- Publication place: Germany
- English publication date: 1932 (Dunlop translation as Death and the Lover); 1968 (Molinaro translation as Narcissus and Goldmund)
- Media type: Print
- Pages: 320
- ISBN: 0-312-42167-2
- OCLC: 51118419
- Dewey Decimal: 833/.912 21
- LC Class: PT2617.E85 N413 2003

Narcissus and Goldmund (German: Narziß und Goldmund, pronounced [naʁˈtsɪs ʔʊnt ˈɡɔltmʊnt]), also published in English as Death and the Lover, is a novel written by the German-Swiss author Hermann Hesse. Published in 1930, at the time of publication Narcissus and Goldmund was considered Hesse's literary triumph; chronologically, it follows Steppenwolf.

== Synopsis ==
Narcissus and Goldmund is the story of a young man, Goldmund (German for 'Gold mouth'), who wanders aimlessly throughout medieval Germany after leaving a Catholic monastery school in search of what could be described as "the meaning of life".

Narcissus, a gifted young teacher at the cloister school, quickly befriends Goldmund, as they are only a few years apart, and Goldmund is naturally bright. Goldmund looks up to Narcissus, and Narcissus has much fondness for him in return. After straying too far in the fields one day on an errand gathering herbs, Goldmund comes across a beautiful Romani woman, who kisses him and invites him to make love. This encounter becomes his epiphany; he now knows he was never meant to be a monk. With Narcissus' help, he leaves the monastery and embarks on a wandering existence.

Goldmund finds he is very attractive to women, and has numerous love affairs. After seeing a particularly beautiful carved Madonna in a church, he feels his own artistic talent awakening and seeks out the master carver, with whom he studies for several years. However, in the end, Goldmund refuses an offer of guild membership, preferring the freedom of the road. When the Black Death devastates the region, Goldmund encounters human existence at its ugliest. Finally, after being imprisoned and condemned to death for having an affair with the wife of the city governor, he is saved by and reunited with his friend Narcissus, now an abbot. The two reflect upon the different paths their lives have taken, contrasting the artist with the thinker.

== Themes ==
As in most of Hesse's works, the main theme of this book is the wanderer's struggle to find himself, as well as the Jungian union of polar opposites (Mysterium Coniunctionis). Goldmund represents nature and the "feminine conscious mind" (but also anima, a man's unconscious), while Narcissus represents science, logic, God, and the "masculine conscious mind" (but also animus, a woman's unconscious). These "feminine" and "masculine" qualities are drawn from the Jungian archetypal structure, and are reminiscent of some of Hesse's earlier works, especially Demian.

Throughout the novel, Goldmund increasingly becomes aware of memories of his own mother, which ultimately results in his desire to return to the Urmutter (primordial mother). However, he also tries to reconcile the Apollonian and Dionysian ideals through art (giving form to the formless).

== English translations ==
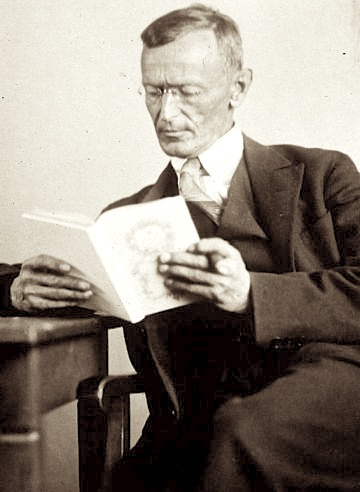
Hesse in 1927

The first translation into English (by Geoffrey Dunlop) appeared in 1932 titled Death and the Lover. Penguin Modern Classics published this translation in 1971, entitled Narziss and Goldmund, reprinting it in 1971 and twice a year during the years 1972, 1973, 1974, 1976, and 1978. In 1968, a translation by Ursule Molinaro was published as Narcissus and Goldmund. In 1994 a new translation by Leila Vennewitz was shortlisted for the Schlegel-Tieck Prize.

== Influences ==
The 1974 Kansas song "Journey from Mariabronn" closely follows the plot of the book.

== Film adaptation ==
A film adaptation, directed by the Austrian Oscar-winning director Stefan Ruzowitzky and produced by the German division of Columbia Pictures, was released in 2020.
