= Castalia (simulator) =

Network simulator

- Developer(s): Thanassis Boulis, Yuriy Tselishchev, Dimosthenis Pediaditakis
- Stable release: 3.3
- Type: Network simulator
- License: Academic Public License
- Website: github.com/boulis/Castalia

Castalia is a simulator for Wireless Sensor Networks (WSN), Body Area Networks and generally networks of low-power embedded devices. It is based on the OMNeT++ platform and used by researchers and developers to test their distributed algorithms and/or protocols in a realistic wireless channel and radio model, with a realistic node behaviour especially relating to access of the radio. Castalia uses the lognormal shadowing model as one of the ways to model average path loss, which has been shown to explain empirical data in WSN. It also models temporal variation of path loss in an effort to capture fading phenomena in changing environments (i.e., the nodes or parts of the environment are moving). Castalia's temporal variation modeling is designed to be fitted to measured data instead of making specific assumptions on the creation of fast fading. Other features of Castalia include: physical process modeling, sensing device bias and noise, node clock drift, and several MAC and routing protocols implemented.

Castalia was developed at the National ICT Australia starting in 2006. Since 2007 it is public as an open source project under the Academic Public License. The current release version is 3.3 (available at GitHub).
