= Beneath the Wheel =

1906 novel by Hermann Hesse

- Author: Hermann Hesse
- Original title: Unterm Rad
- Language: German
- Genre: Novel
- Publisher: S. Fisherman
- Publication date: 1906
- Publication place: Germany
- Media type: Print (hardcover)
- Pages: 192 pp
- OCLC: 9488637

Beneath the Wheel (Unterm Rad) is a 1906 novel written by Hermann Hesse. The novel is a severe criticism of academic education that ignores students' personal development; in that respect, it is typical of Hesse's work. A Peter Owen Publishers translation was published in 1957 as The Prodigy. Farrar, Straus & Giroux in 1968 published as Beneath the Wheel an English translation by Michael Roloff.

There are autobiographical elements in the story (Hesse attended and was expelled from the seminary described in the novel).

== Plot summary ==
Beneath the Wheel is the story of Hans Giebenrath, a talented boy sent to a seminary in Maulbronn. His education is focused solely on increasing his knowledge, neglecting personal development. His close friendship with Hermann Heilner, a more liberal fellow student, is a source of comfort for Hans. Heilner is expelled from the seminary, and Giebenrath is sent home after his academic performance declines as symptoms of mental illness develop.

Back home, he finds coping with his situation difficult, having lost most of his childhood to scholastic study, and having never formed lasting personal relationships with anyone in his village. He is apprenticed to a mechanic, and seems to find satisfaction in the work: it is visceral and concrete, as opposed to the intellectual abstraction of scholarly pursuit. Despite some personal fulfillment in this existence, Hans never fully adjusts to his new situation, and on a pub crawl in a neighboring village he and some colleagues get drunk. Hans leaves the group to walk home early, and is later found drowned in a river.

== References in other media ==
Beneath the Wheel has been referred in other media:

- The crossover thrash band D.R.I.'s 1989 album Thrash Zone references Beneath the Wheel in a song with the same title.
- New Zealand band Split Enz's second track of their first album Mental Notes Under the Wheel has references from this book.

== See also ==
- Bildungsroman
