= Camen =

Swiss singer and songwriter (born 1974)

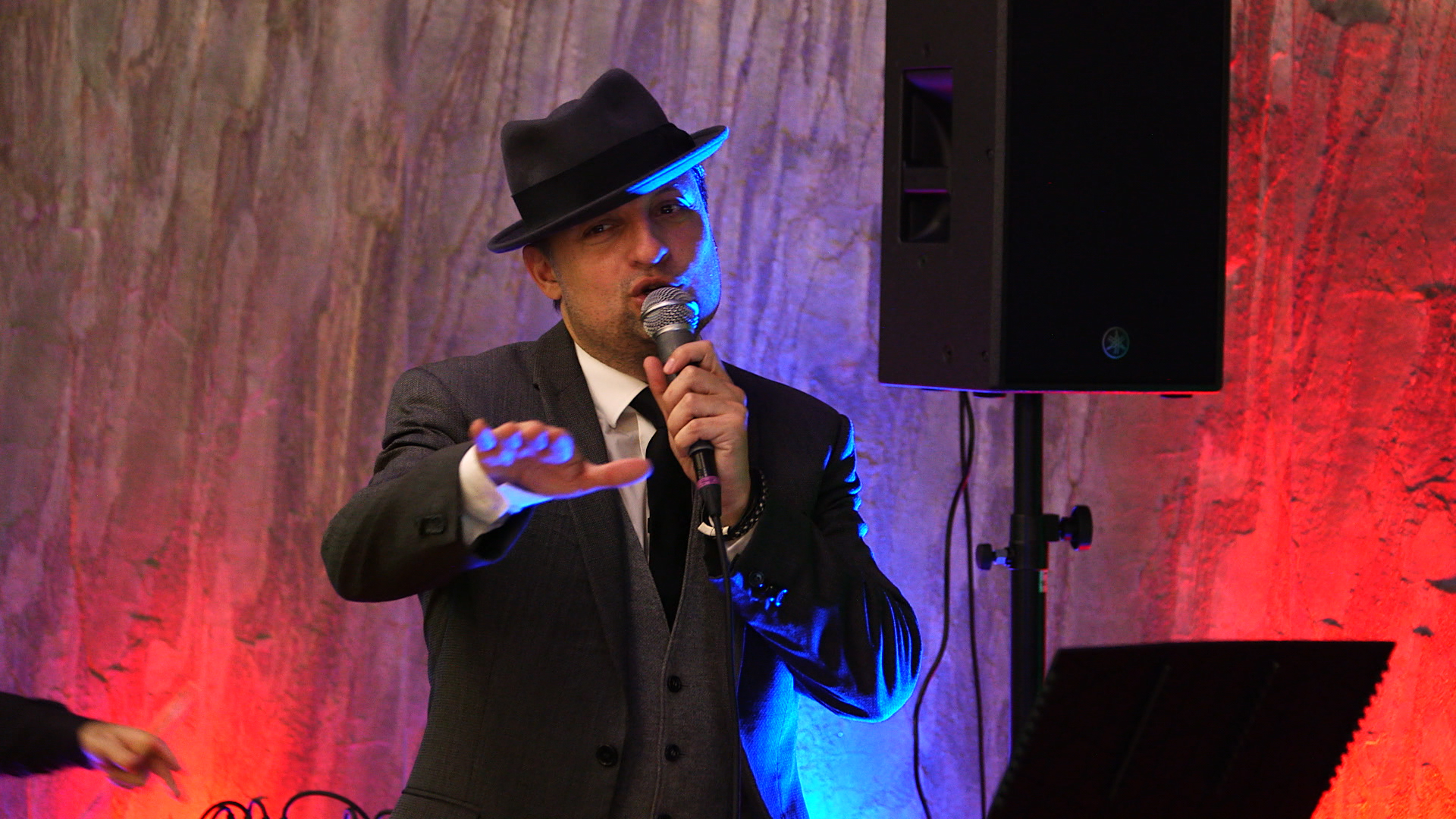
Camen (Pascal Camenzind) on 29 September 2020 at WIN 4 in Winterthur

Pascal Camenzind (born 16 September 1974), better known by his stage name Camen, is a Swiss soul singer and songwriter.

== Biography ==
Camen comes from a family of classical musicians. At a young age, he was inspired by rock'n'roll singer Shakin' Stevens. At the age of ten he was performing in hotels and local venues and between 1982 and 1987 won several talent competitions as a cover artist. At age 12 he started writing songs and with some friends formed the band "Mighty Sharp", with which he won the European talent competition "Talent Explosion". In 1991 Mighty Sharp was named best band in the Canton of Zurich by Radio 24 and was Chaka Khan’s supporting act in Germany. After four years, "Mighty Sharp" disbanded and Pascal Camenzind started a solo career as Pascal Camen. During a stay in England he gained experience as a street musician. After his return, he performed for two years with jazz pianist Christian Rösli in bars and clubs in Switzerland and nearby countries.

In 1997, Camen met DJ BoBo at the Midem music fair in Cannes. DJ Bobo helped him getting signed (Yes Music/EMI Music), suggested the stage name Camen and took over his management. In 1997, the single Everything Changed, written by DJ BoBo, and the El DeBarge cover Rhythm Of The Night were released. In the same year, Camen traveled with DJ BoBo as special guest on his World In Motion tour (Europe) and with the US boy band *NSYNC on their For The Girl tour (Europe). The following year, he joined DJ BoBo on his Magic Tour (Switzerland). The song 5,000 Miles Away, which Camen co-composed, remained in the Swiss singles charts for five weeks and reached number 25 in the Swiss airplay charts. His album Twelve reached number 32 in the album charts in September 1998 and the self-composed single So Many Mistakes reached number 34 in the Swiss airplay charts.

Due to artistic differences Camen ended his collaboration with DJ BoBo and Yes Music after his first album. In 2002, his second album Addicted To It was released by K-Tel label. At first Camen could not build on his former success. In 2005 he released the single How Long, additional singles and one album under his own label "NeMac Entertainment". In 2009 Camen was the voice of the official Street Parade anthem Still have a dream and in 2010 performed in a crossover concert with the symphony orchestra Camerata Schweiz under the direction of Howard Griffiths at the Züri Fäscht. The fourth album, Move on (Musikvertrieb/Muve), entered the top ten of the Swiss album charts in September 2012. This was followed by the singles Wake Up Next To You (2021) and, on International Women's Day 2022, the single For The Women. In the movie Color del Cielo - Color of Heaven (2022) by Joan-Marc Zapata he interpreted the song Baby, Won't You Please Come Home in a scene with Carlos Leal. Together with Gino Todesco he composed and produced Pure Love, the official song of the Wunderlampe Foundation, in 2024. Camen and his band regularly play at festivals, clubs and events in Switzerland and abroad. Since 2015, he is performing biweekly as resident artist at the Zürich venue "Terrasse". Since 2023 he has been performing for the luxury river cruise company Uniworld Boutique River Cruises. In 2025 he signed an exclusive cooperation agreement lasting until 2028, including up to 92 shows per year.

== Awards ==
- 1990: First place with the band "Mighty Sharp" at "Talent Explosion", a European competition for musicians under 18, organised by the youth magazine Popcorn and broadcast by SAT.1
- 1991: First place with the band Mighty Sharp at the "Züriband Competition" organised by Radio 24 (best band in the Canton of Zürich)
- 1994: Together with three other artists, winner of the national talent competition "Swiss Top" (Schweizer Radio DRS)

== Discography ==
=== Studio albums ===
- Twelve (1998)
- Addicted To It (2002)
- The Right Track (2006)
- Move On (2012)

=== Singles ===
- Everything Changed (No Matter What You Do) (1997)
- Rhythm Of The Night (1997)
- 5000 Miles Away (1998)
- So Many Mistakes (1998)
- What You Do (1998)
- More Than Ever (2001)
- Addicted To It (2002)
- How Long (2005)
- Just Because (2006)
- Tell Me (2006)
- The Right Track (2007)
- Maximum (2007)
- The Way It Goes (2008)
- Trapped (2012)
- Probably (2012)
- Wake Up Next To You (2021)
- For The Women (2022)
- Flow (2023)
- Pure Love (2024)

Charts
Year	Title	Peak	Weeks
1998	Single: 5000 Miles Away	42	5
1998	Album: Twelve	32	3
2012	Album: Move On	10	1
