= Klingsor's Last Summer =

Hermann Hesse novella written in 1919

- 1973 edition
- Author: Hermann Hesse
- Original title: Klingsors letzter Sommer
- Language: German
- Publisher: S. Fischer Verlag
- Publication date: 1920
- Publication place: Germany
- Media type: Print (hardcover and paperback)
- Followed by: Siddhartha

Klingsor's Last Summer is a novella by Hermann Hesse.

Written over the course of a few weeks in July and August 1919, it was published in December 1919 in the Neue Rundschau. It was later published (by S. Fischer Verlag) in a volume which included Kinderseele and Klein und Wagner.

== Plot ==
The story is an account of the final months of the life of Klingsor, a forty-two-year-old expressionist painter. A lover of poetry, a heavy drinker, and a womanizer, he spends his final summer in southern Switzerland, torn between sensuality and spirituality and troubled by feelings of impending death.

== Character list ==
- Klingsor
- Louis the cruel
- Ersilia
- The Queen of the mountains
- The Armenian astrologer
- Edith
