= Hans Sturzenegger =

Swiss painter (1875–1943)

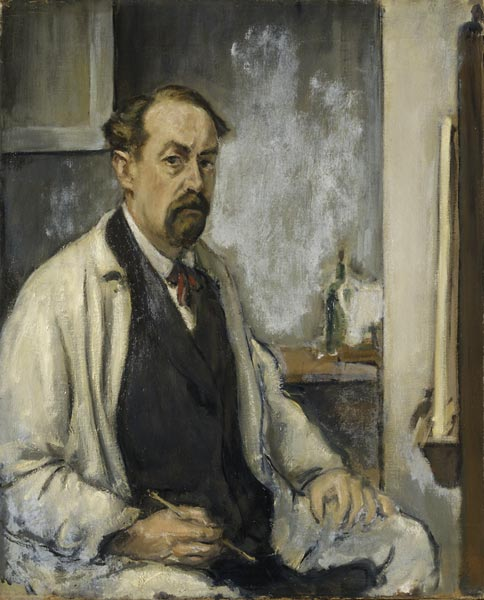
- Born: 2 May 1875; Zürich, Switzerland
- Died: 19 November 1943 (aged 68); Zürich, Switzerland
- Known for: Landscapes and portraits

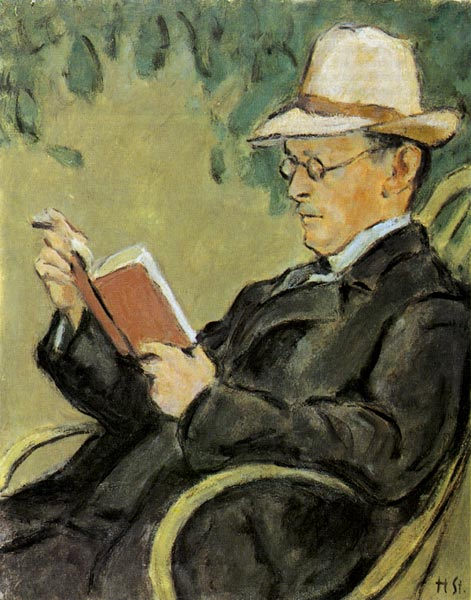
Hermann Hesse in a Panama hat, 1912

Hans Sturzenegger (2 May 1875 – 19 November 1943) was a Swiss painter known for his landscapes and portraits. He studied at the Karlsruhe Academy of Fine Arts and later worked in Schaffhausen, Rüschlikon and Munich. Following his death, his works and art collection were bequeathed to the Museum zu Allerheiligen in Schaffhausen.

== Biography ==
Hans Sturzenegger was born in Zürich on 2 May 1875. He grew up at the Belair estate in Schaffhausen. From 1892, he studied at the Karlsruhe Academy of Fine Arts. He also received training in etching.

After spending time in Dachau and its surrounding area, where he became acquainted with Adolf Hölzel, Sturzenegger worked in Schaffhausen and in the artists' colony at Rüschlikon between 1898 and 1903. From 1904 to 1906, he continued his studies in Karlsruhe as a master student of Hans Thoma before returning to Schaffhausen, where he established a studio at the Belair estate.

Sturzenegger travelled to the Netherlands, southern France, England and India during his career. He visited India twice, in 1911 and 1913, the first time accompanied by Hermann Hesse. In 1913, he rented a studio in Munich, where he worked until 1917 with interruptions before giving it up during the First World War.

In 1939, an eye condition forced Sturzenegger to stop painting. He died in Zürich on 19 November 1943.

== Work ==
The principal subjects of Sturzenegger's work were landscapes and portraits. He also produced paintings of female figures and figure groups.

Sturzenegger's landscapes depicted both local scenery and places he visited during his travels abroad. His Dutch scenes and paintings inspired by his journeys to India are among his best-known works. As a portrait painter, he initially focused on family members and friends before becoming a sought-after portrait painter among the educated and affluent classes of eastern Switzerland after 1918.

== Exhibitions ==
Sturzenegger's work was the subject of solo exhibitions at the Kunstmuseum Winterthur in 1925 and 1942. After his death, memorial exhibitions were held at the Kunsthaus Zürich in 1944–45 and at the Kunstmuseum Luzern in 1945.

== Legacy ==
Following his death, Sturzenegger bequeathed his own works and art collection to the Museum zu Allerheiligen in Schaffhausen. In 1987, the Sturzenegger Foundation was established.
