= Eugen Diederichs =

German publisher (1867–1930)

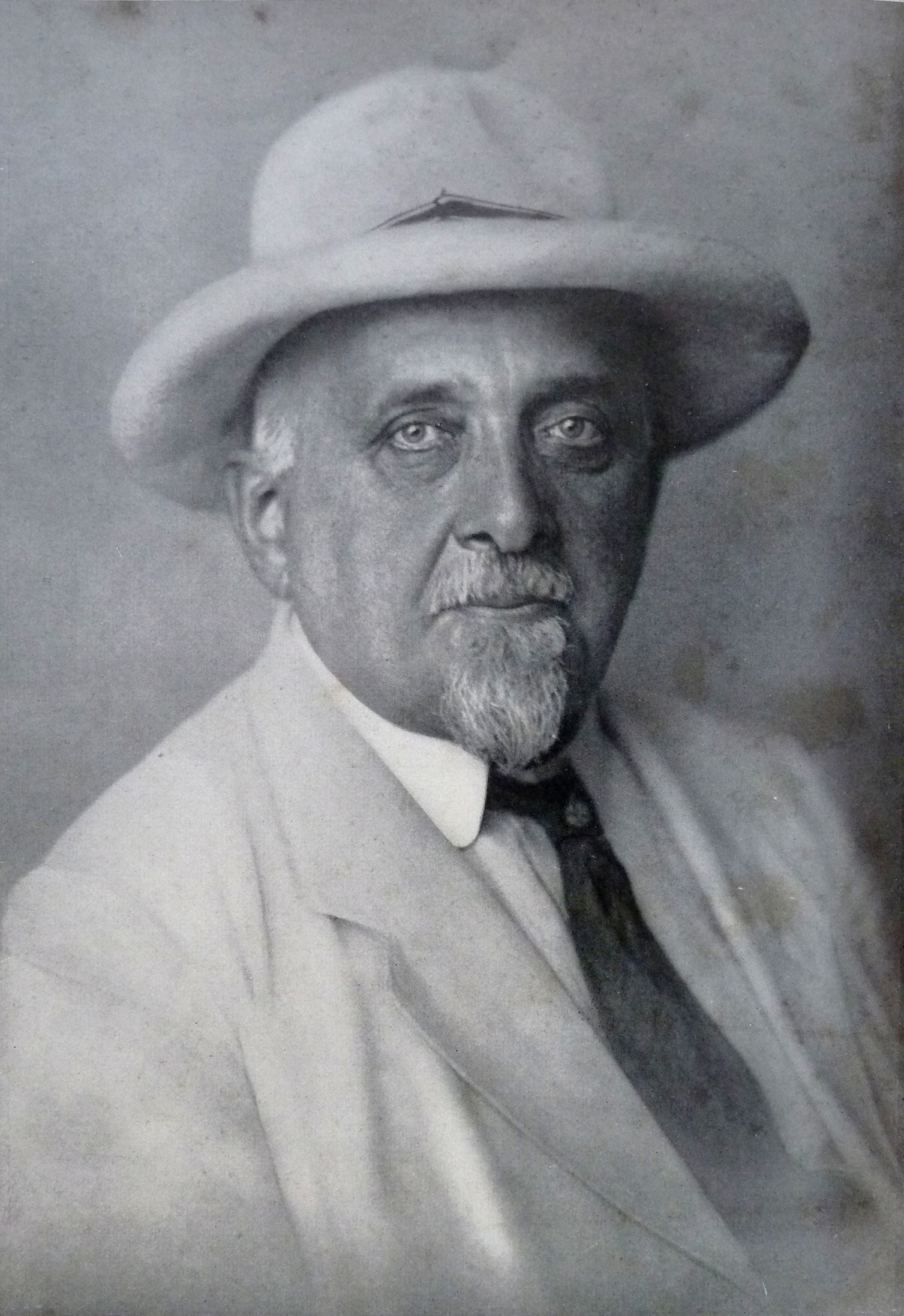
Eugen Diederichs

Eugen Diederichs (June 22, 1867 – September 10, 1930) was a German publisher born in Löbitz, in the Prussian Province of Saxony.

== Life ==
Diederichs started his publishing company in Florence, Italy, in 1896. He moved on to Leipzig, where he published the early works of Hermann Hesse, and from there to Jena in 1904. He started publishing the magazine Die Tat in 1912. His publishing firm, the Eugen Diederichs Verlag, played a central role in Germany's neo-conservative or revolutionary conservative movement in the late 19th and early 20th century.

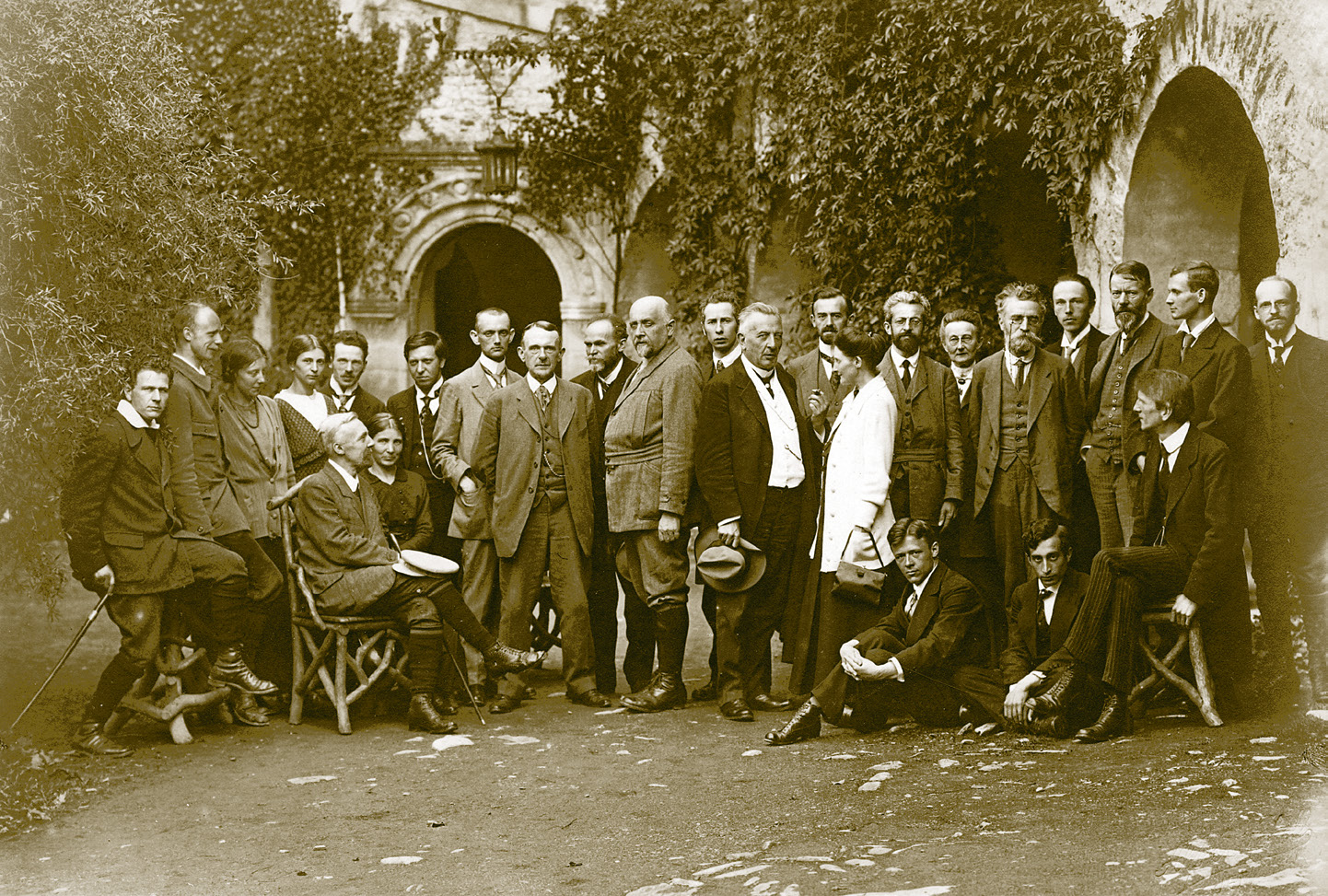
Eugen Diederichs with the Lauenstein Conference participants in 1917

Diedrichs married Helene Voigt in 1898; the couple separated in 1911. He married the writer Lulu von Strauss und Torney in 1916. Diederichs died in Jena in 1930.

Since 1988, Diederichs became an imprint of the Hugendubel publishing house.
