= Helene Voigt-Diederichs =

German writer (1875–1961)

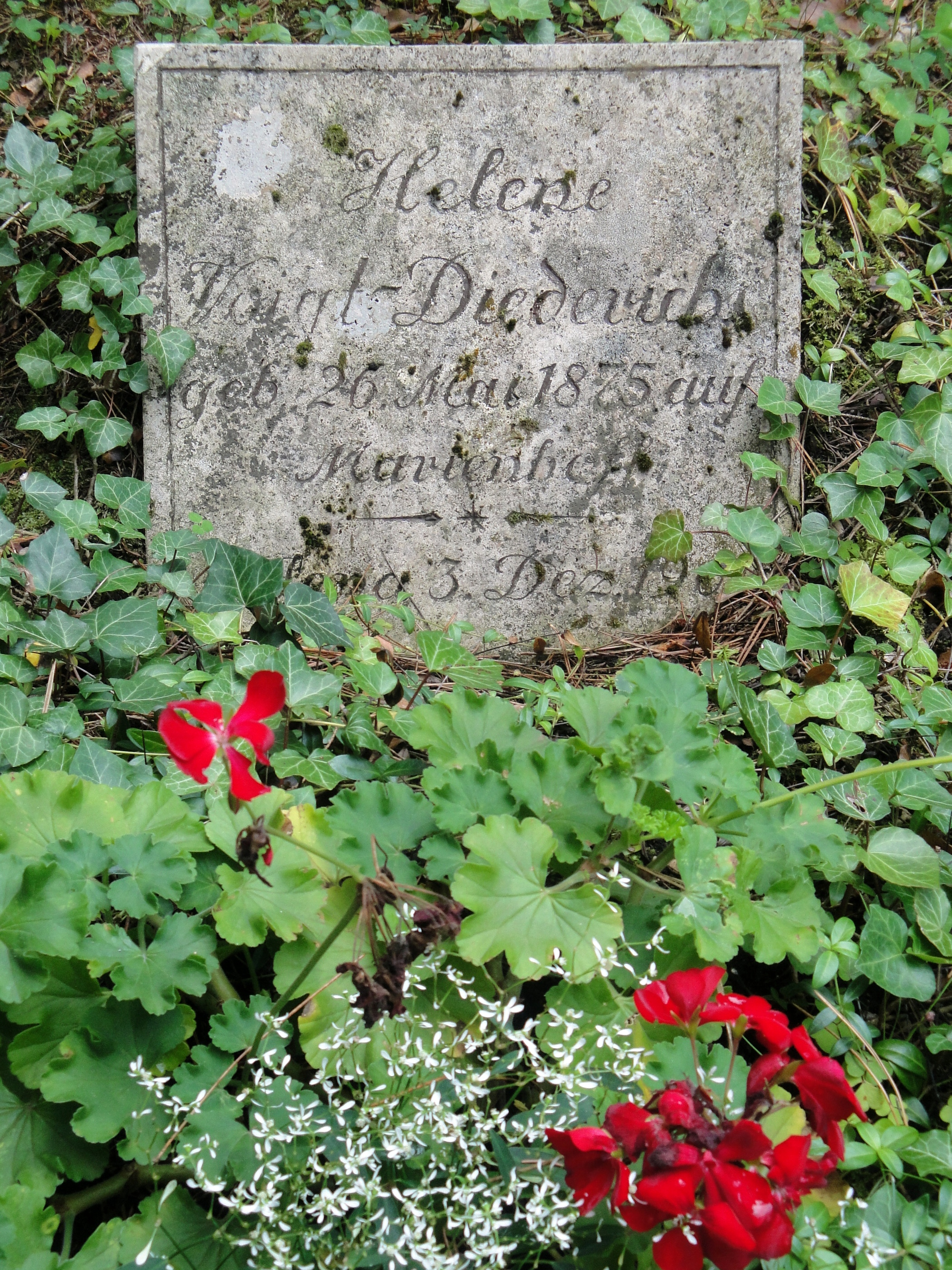
Grave in Jena

Helene Theodora Voigt-Diederichs (28 May 1875 – 3 December 1961) was a German writer.

The daughter of Christian Theodor Voigt and Marie Louise Brinckmann, she was born Helene Theodora Voigt on the family estate Marienhoff near Eckernförde and was educated by private tutors. Voigt sent Hermann Hesse a "fan letter" after reading one of his poems in 1897 and the two continued to exchange letters for a number of years. In 1898, she married the publisher Eugen Diederichs. She moved with him to Jena; after they separated in 1911, she moved to Brunswick but returned to Jena in 1931. She died in Jena at the age of 86.

== Selected works ==
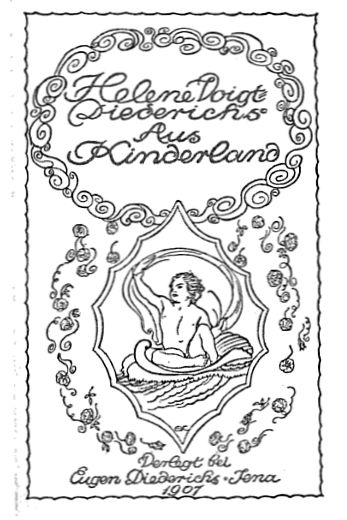
Aus Kinderland cover

- Regine Vosgerau, novel (1901)
- Unterstrom, lyrics (1901), inspired by Jens Peter Jacobsen
- Dreiviertel Stund vor Tag (Three-quarters of an hour before day-break), novel (1905)
- Aus Kinderland (The land of children), stories (1907)
- Wandertage in England (Wandering in England), travelogue (1912)
- Mann und Frau (Husband and wife), stories (1921)
- Marienhoff, biography (1925), describes her mother's life
- Ring um Roderich (A ring around Roderick), novel (1929)
- Der grüne Papagei (The green parrot), stories (1934)
- Gast in Siebenbürgen (A guest in Siebenbürgen), travelogue (1936)
- Das Verlöbnis (The engagement), novel (1942)
- Der Zaubertrank (The enchanted drink), stories (1948)
- Die Bernsteinkette (The amber necklace), stories (1951)
- Waage des Lebens (The scale of life), novel (1952)
