= The Glass Bead Game =

Novel by Hermann Hesse (1943)

- First German edition
- Author: Hermann Hesse
- Original title: Das Glasperlenspiel
- Translator: Mervyn Savill (1949), Richard and Clara Winston (1969)
- Language: German
- Genre: Fiction
- Publisher: Holt, Rinehart and Winston
- Publication date: 1943
- Publication place: Switzerland
- English publication date: 1949
- Media type: print (hardback & paperback)
- Pages: 558

The Glass Bead Game (German: Das Glasperlenspiel, pronounced [das ˈɡlaːspɛʁlənˌʃpiːl]) is the last full-length novel by the German author Hermann Hesse. It was begun in 1931 in Switzerland, where it was published in 1943 after being rejected for publication in Germany due to Hesse's anti-fascist views.

"The Glass Bead Game" is a literal translation of the German title, but the book has also been published under the title Magister Ludi, Latin for "Master of the Game", an honorific title awarded to the book's central character. "Magister Ludi" can also be seen as a pun: magister is a Latin word meaning "teacher", while ludus can be translated as either "game" or "school". But the title Magister Ludi is somewhat misleading, as it implies the book is a straightforward Bildungsroman, when, in reality, the book touches on many different genres, and the bulk of the story is on one level a parody of the genre of biography.

In 1946, Hesse won the Nobel Prize in Literature. In honoring him in its Award Ceremony Speech, the Swedish Academy said that the novel "occupies a special position" in Hesse's work. In 2019, the novel was nominated for the 1944 Retrospective Hugo Award for Best Novel.

== Description ==
The Glass Bead Game takes place at an unspecified date centuries in the future. Hesse suggested that he imagined the book's narrator writing around the start of the 25th century. The setting is a fictional province of central Europe called Castalia, which was reserved by political decision for the life of the mind; technology and economic life are kept to a strict minimum. Castalia is home to an austere order of intellectuals with a twofold mission: to run boarding schools, and to cultivate and play the Glass Bead Game, whose exact nature remains elusive and whose devotees occupy a special school in Castalia known as Waldzell. The rules of the game are only alluded to—they are so sophisticated that they are not easy to imagine. Playing the game well requires years of hard study of music, mathematics, and cultural history. The game is essentially an abstract synthesis of all arts and sciences. It proceeds by players making deep connections between seemingly unrelated topics.

The novel is an example of a Bildungsroman, following the life of a distinguished member of the Castalian Order, Joseph Knecht, whose surname means "servant" and is cognate with the English word knight. The name of the main character in the first of “Three Lives” at the end of the novel, called The Rain Maker, is also Knecht, while the central character in the second of these, with the title The Father Confessor, is Josephus Famulus, i.e. a Latin version of the same name, “Joseph Servant”).

The plot of the novel’s main story chronicles Knecht's education as a youth, his decision to join the order, his mastery of the Game, and his advancement in the order's hierarchy to eventually become Magister Ludi, the executive officer of the Castalian Order's game administrators.

== Plot ==
The novel's beginning introduces the Music Master, the resident of Castalia who recruits Knecht as a young student and who is to have the longest-lasting and profoundest effect on Knecht throughout his life. At one point, as the Music Master nears death in his home at Monteport, Knecht obliquely refers to the Master's "sainthood". At the prestigious school Waldzell, Knecht develops another meaningful friendship with Plinio Designori, a young man from a politically influential family, who is studying in Castalia as a guest. Knecht holds vigorous debates with Designori, who views Castalia as an "ivory tower" with little to no impact on the outside world. Knecht disagrees and argues in favor of Castalia.

Although educated in Castalia, Knecht's path to "Magister Ludi" is atypical for the order, as he spends much of his time after graduation outside the province's boundaries. His first such venture, to the Bamboo Grove, results in his learning Chinese and becoming something of a disciple to Elder Brother, a recluse who had given up living in Castalia. Next, as part of an assignment to foster goodwill between the order and the Catholic Church, Knecht is sent on several "missions" to the Benedictine monastery of Mariafels, where he befriends the historian Father Jacobus—a relationship that also profoundly affects Knecht.

As the novel progresses, Knecht, already a "Magister Ludi", begins to question his loyalty to the order, gradually coming to doubt that the intellectually gifted have a right to withdraw from life's big problems. Knecht, too, comes to see Castalia as a kind of ivory tower, an ethereal and protected community, devoted to pure intellectual pursuits but oblivious to the problems of life outside its borders. This conclusion precipitates a personal crisis, and, according to his personal views regarding spiritual awakening, Knecht does the unthinkable: he resigns as Magister Ludi and asks to leave the order, ostensibly to become of value and service to the larger culture. The heads of the order deny his request, but Knecht departs Castalia anyway, initially taking a job as a tutor to his childhood friend Designori's energetic and strong-willed son, Tito. Only a few days later, the story ends abruptly with Knecht drowning in a mountain lake while attempting to follow Tito on a swim for which Knecht was unfit.

The fictional narrator leaves off before the final sections of the book, remarking that the end of the story is beyond the scope of his biography. The concluding chapter, "The Legend", is reportedly from a different biography. After this final chapter, several of Knecht's "posthumous" works are then presented. The first section contains Knecht's poetry from various periods of his life, followed by three short stories labeled "Three Lives". These are presented as exercises by Knecht imagining his life had he been born in another time and place. The first tells of a pagan rainmaker named Knecht who lived "many thousands of years ago, when women ruled". Eventually the shaman's powers to summon rain fail, and he offers himself as a sacrifice for the good of the tribe. The second is based on the life of St Hilarion and tells of Josephus, an early Christian hermit who acquires a reputation for piety but is inwardly troubled by self-loathing and seeks a confessor, only to find that same penitent had been seeking him.

The final story concerns the life of Dasa, a prince wrongfully usurped by his half-brother as heir to a kingdom and disguised as a cowherd to save his life. While working with the herdsmen as a young boy, Dasa encounters a yogi in meditation in the forest. He wishes to experience the same tranquility as the yogi, but is unable to stay. He later leaves the herdsmen and marries a beautiful young woman, only to be cuckolded by his half-brother (now the Rajah). In a cold fury, he kills his half-brother and finds himself once again in the forest with the old yogi, who, through an experience of an alternate life, guides him on the spiritual path and out of the world of illusion (Maya).

The three lives, together with that as Magister Ludi, oscillate between extroversion (rainmaker, Indian life—both get married) and introversion (father confessor, Magister Ludi) while developing the four basic psychic functions of analytical psychology: sensation (rainmaker), intuition (Indian life), feeling (father confessor), and thinking (Magister Ludi).

=== Earlier plans ===
Hesse originally intended several different lives of the same person as he is reincarnated. Instead, he focused on a story set in the future and placed the three shorter stories, "authored" by Knecht in The Glass Bead Game, at the end of the novel.

Two drafts of a fourth life were published in 1965, the second recast in the first person and breaking off earlier. Dated 1934, they describe Knecht's childhood and education as a Swabian theologian. This Knecht has been born some dozen years after the Treaty of Rijswijk in the time of Eberhard Ludwig, and in depicting the other characters Hesse draws heavily on actual biographies: Friedrich Christoph Oetinger, Johann Friedrich Rock, Johann Albrecht Bengel and Nicolaus Zinzendorf make up the cast of Pietist mentors. Knecht is heavily drawn to music, both that of Pachelbel and the more exotic Buxtehude. The fragment breaks off as the young contemporary of Bach happens upon an organ recital in Stuttgart.

=== Central characters ===
- Joseph Knecht: The story's main character. He is the Magister Ludi for a majority of the book.
- The Music Master: Knecht's spiritual mentor who, when Knecht is a child, examines him for entrance into the elite schools of Castalia.
- Plinio Designori: Knecht's foil in the world outside.
- Father Jacobus: Benedictine monk and Joseph Knecht's antithesis in faith.
- Elder Brother: A former Castalian and student of various Chinese scripts and ideologies.
- Thomas van der Trave: Joseph Knecht's predecessor as Magister Ludi.
- Fritz Tegularius: A friend of Knecht's but a portent of what Castalians might become if they remain insular.

== Castalia ==
Castalia, where most of the novel is set, is described in English translation as the "pedagogical province". It forms part of a large and prosperous state whose leaders are broadly but not uncritically sympathetic to the Castalian ideal of scholarship.

Castalia is an entirely male community, whose members are or aspire to be members of a secular order similar to monastic orders. Prospective members are recruited in their pre-teens and early teens from the most promising scholars in its host state's regular schools. One of Castalia's roles (not explored in depth in the book) is provision of schoolteachers to its host state. Another is the advancement of learning, primarily in the fields of mathematics, musicology (of Western music up to the 18th century), philology, and the history of art. This role is entirely analytical: creativity and scientific research appear to be non-existent. A third role is to cultivate and develop the Glass Bead Game.

== The game ==
The Glass Bead Game is "a kind of synthesis of human learning" in which themes, such as a musical phrase or a philosophical thought, are stated. As the Game progresses, associations between the themes become deeper and more varied. Although the Glass Bead Game is described lucidly, the rules and mechanics are not explained in detail.

The popularity of the book led to the development of a community of game designers exploring what a playable game might be like. A physical game called the Glass Plate Game was developed in 1976 by Adrian Wolfe and Dunbar Aitkens, focusing on connections between the ideas of a conversation. Online variants began to be developed in the 2010s.

== Allusions ==
Many of the novel's characters have names that are allusive word games. For example, Knecht's predecessor as Magister Ludi was Thomas van der Trave, a veiled reference to Thomas Mann, who was born in Lübeck, situated on the Trave river. Knecht's brilliant but unstable friend Fritz Tegularius (Latin: "roof tile maker") is based on Friedrich Nietzsche, while Father Jacobus is based on the historian Jacob Burckhardt. The name of Carlo Ferromonte is an Italianized version of the name of Hesse's nephew, Karl Isenberg, while the name of the Glass Bead Game's inventor, Bastian Perrot of Calw, was taken from Heinrich Perrot, who owned a machine shop where Hesse once worked after dropping out of school. The name of the pedagogic province in the story is taken from Greek legend of the nymph Castalia, who was transformed into an inspiration-granting fountain by the god Apollo.

== As utopian literature ==
In his biography of Hesse, Freedman wrote that the tensions caused by the rise of the Nazi Party in Germany directly contributed to the creation of The Glass Bead Game as a response to the oppressive times. "The educational province of Castalia, which provided a setting for the novel, came to resemble Hesse's childhood Swabia physically while assuming more and more the function of his adopted home, neutral Switzerland, which in turn embodied his own antidote to the crises of his time. It became the 'island of love' or at least an island of the spirit." According to Freedman, in the Glass Bead Game, "contemplation, the secrets of the Chinese I Ching and Western mathematics and music fashioned the perennial conflicts of his life into a unifying design."

== English translations ==
- 1949: Mervyn Savill (translated as Magister Ludi)
- 1969: Richard and Clara Winston

== Adaptations ==
In 2010, The Glass Bead Game was dramatised by Lavinia Greenlaw for BBC Radio 4. It starred Derek Jacobi as the Biographer, Tom Ferguson as Knecht and David Seddon as Plinio.

== See also ==
- Existentialism
- Epistemology
- Musikalisches Würfelspiel
- Ontology
- Polysemy
- Syncretism
