= Steppenwolf (novel) =

1927 novel by Hermann Hesse

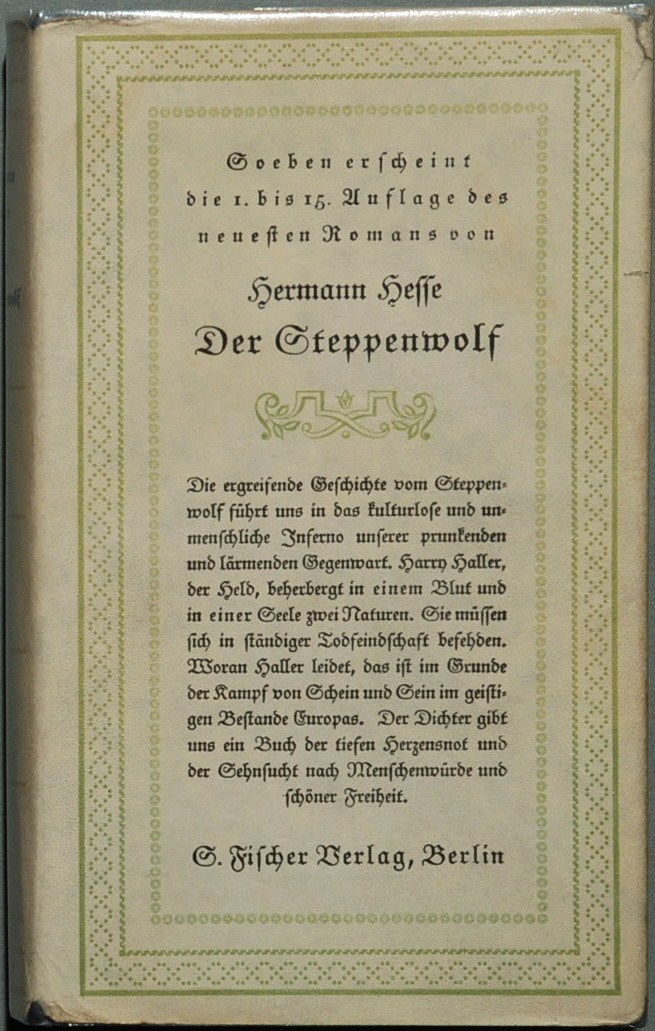
- Cover of the original German edition
- Author: Hermann Hesse
- Original title: Der Steppenwolf
- Language: German
- Genre: Autobiographical, novel, existential
- Publisher: S. Fischer Verlag (Ger)
- Publication date: 1927
- Publication place: Switzerland
- Media type: Print (hardback and paperback)
- Pages: 237
- ISBN: 0-312-27867-5

Steppenwolf (originally Der Steppenwolf) is the tenth novel by German-Swiss author Hermann Hesse.

Originally published in Germany in 1927, it was first translated into English in 1929. The novel was titled from the German word for the steppe wolf. The story in large part reflects a profound crisis in Hesse's spiritual world during the 1920s.

Steppenwolf was wildly popular and has remained a perpetual success, but Hesse later said the book was largely misunderstood.

== Background and publication history ==
In 1924, Hermann Hesse married singer Ruth Wenger. After several weeks, he left Basel, only returning near the end of the year. Upon his return, he rented a separate apartment, adding to his isolation. After a short trip to Germany with Wenger, Hesse almost completely stopped seeing her. The resulting isolation and inability to make lasting contact with the outside world led to increasing despair and the return of Hesse's suicidal thoughts.

Hesse began writing Steppenwolf in Basel, and finished it in Zürich. In 1926, he published a precursor to the book, a collection of poems titled The Crisis: From Hermann Hesse's Diary. The novel was released in 1927. The first English edition, translated by Basil Creighton, was published in 1929 by Martin Secker in the United Kingdom and by Henry Holt and Company in the United States.

In 1926, Hesse also became acquainted with jazz music, attending Swiss performances of the Revue Nègre featuring Josephine Baker and Sidney Bechet; Steven C. Tracy, professor of Afro-American Studies at the University of Massachusetts, writes, "the character of Pablo... was inspired by Bechet's playing".

== Plot summary ==
The book is presented as a manuscript written by its protagonist, a middle-aged man named Harry Haller, who leaves it to a chance acquaintance, his landlady's nephew. The acquaintance adds a short preface and has the manuscript published. The title of this "real" book-within-the-book is Harry Haller's Records (For Madmen Only).

As the story begins, Harry is beset by reflections on his being ill-suited for the world of everyday, regular people, specifically for frivolous bourgeois society. In his aimless wanderings about the city he encounters a person carrying an advertisement for a magic theatre who gives him a small book, Treatise on the Steppenwolf. This treatise, cited in full in the novel's text as Harry reads it, addresses Harry by name and strikes him as describing himself uncannily. It is a discourse on a man who believes himself to be of two natures: one high, man's spiritual nature, the other low and animalistic, a "wolf of the steppes". This man is entangled in an irresolvable struggle, never content with either nature because he cannot see beyond this self-made concept. The pamphlet gives an explanation of the multifaceted and indefinable nature of every man's soul, but Harry is either unable or unwilling to recognize this. It also discusses his suicidal intentions, describing him as one of the "suicides": people who, deep down, knew they would take their own life one day. But to counter that, it hails his potential to be great, to be one of the "Immortals".

By chance, Harry encounters the man who gave him the book, just as they have both attended a funeral. He inquires about the magic theater, to which the man replies, "Not for everybody." When Harry presses further for information, the man recommends a local dance hall, to Harry's disappointment.

When returning from the funeral, Harry meets a former academic friend with whom he had often discussed Oriental mythology, and who invites Harry to his home. While there, Harry is disgusted by the nationalistic mentality of his friend, who inadvertently criticizes a column Harry wrote. In turn, Harry offends the man and his wife by criticizing the wife's engraving of Goethe, which Harry feels is too thickly sentimental and insulting to Goethe's true brilliance. This episode confirms to Harry that he is, and will always be, a stranger to his society.

Trying to postpone returning home, where he fears all that awaits him is his own suicide, Harry walks aimlessly around town for most of the night, finally stopping to rest at the dance hall where the man had sent him earlier. He happens upon a young woman, Hermine, who quickly recognizes his desperation. They talk at length; Hermine alternately mocks Harry's self-pity and indulges his explanations of his view of life, to his astonished relief. Hermine promises a second meeting, and gives Harry a reason to live (or at least a substantial excuse to continue living) that he eagerly embraces.

During the next few weeks, Hermine introduces Harry to the indulgences of what he calls the "bourgeois". She teaches him to dance, introduces him to casual drug use, finds him a lover (Maria) and, more importantly, forces him to accept these as legitimate and worthy aspects of a full life.

Hermine also introduces Harry to a mysterious saxophonist, Pablo, who appears to be the opposite of what Harry considers a serious, thoughtful man. After attending a lavish masquerade ball, Pablo brings Harry to his metaphorical "magic theatre", where the concerns and notions that plagued his soul disintegrate as he interacts with the ethereal and phantasmal. At the Magic Theatre he experiences the fantasies that exist in his mind. The Theatre is described as a long, horseshoe-shaped corridor with a mirror on one side and a great number of doors on the other. Harry enters five of these labeled doors, each of which symbolizes a fraction of his life.

Harry appears and kills Hermine with a knife while she lies next to Pablo. Pablo wakes, covers her body with a rug, and exits the room, after which he returns disguised as Mozart to chastise Harry for his attitude in life. Harry realizes that by stabbing Hermine he simply projected his own suicidal desires, recognizes Pablo behind his disguise, and, as the hallucination fades away, Pablo picks up the dead Hermine, transformed into a chess piece, and puts her in his pocket.

Major characters

- Harry Haller – the protagonist, a middle-aged man
- Pablo – a saxophonist
- Hermine – a young woman Haller meets at a dance
- Maria – Hermine's friend

== Critical analysis ==
In the preface to the novel's 1960 edition, Hesse wrote that Steppenwolf was "more often and more violently misunderstood" than any of his other books. He felt that his readers focused only on the suffering and despair in Harry Haller's life, thereby missing the possibility of transcendence and healing.

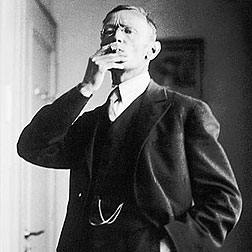
Hermann Hesse in 1926

== Critical reception ==
Close friends and longtime readers of Hesse criticized the novel for its perceived immorality in its open depiction of sex and drug use, a criticism that remained the primary rebuke of the novel for many years.

American novelist Jack Kerouac dismissed it in Big Sur (1962), though popular interest revived in the 1960s, specifically in the psychedelic movement, because it was seen as a counterculture book and because of its depiction of free love and explicit drug use.

== English translations ==
- 1929: Steppenwolf, trans. Basil Creighton
- 1963: Steppenwolf, revision by Joseph Mileck of the Creighton translation
- 1957: Steppenwolf, revision by Walter Sorell of the Creighton translation, Frederick Ungar, New York
- 2010: Steppenwolf, trans. Thomas Wayne, Algora Publishing, New York
- 2012: Steppenwolf, trans. David Horrocks, Penguin Books, New York
- 2023: The Steppenwolf, trans. Kurt Beals, W.W. Norton & Company; Norton Critical Edition, 1925

== Adaptations ==
The novel was adapted into the 1974 film Steppenwolf. It starred Max von Sydow and Dominique Sanda, and was written and directed by Fred Haines.

The novel was the basis for the chamber opera Der Steppenwolf composed by Bent Lorentzen to a German libretto by Michael Leinert. It was composed in 1999 and first performed in Aarhus, Denmark, on 4 February 2016.

== References in popular culture ==
Hesse's 1928 short story "Harry, the Steppenwolf" forms a companion piece to the novel. It is about a wolf named Harry who is kept in a zoo and entertains crowds by destroying images of German cultural icons such as Goethe and Mozart.

A paragraph in Hesse's 1943 novel The Glass Bead Game says that "magic theater" is another name of the glass bead game itself.

The name Steppenwolf has become notable in popular culture for various organizations and establishments.

- In 1967, the band Steppenwolf, headed by German-born singer John Kay, took its name from the novel.
- The Belgian band DAAU (Die Anarchistische Abendunterhaltung) is named after one of the advertising slogans of the novel's magical theatre.
- The innovative Magic Theatre Company, founded in 1967 in Berkeley and later resident in San Francisco, takes its name from the "Magic Theatre" of the novel
- The Steppenwolf Theatre Company in Chicago, founded in 1974 by actors Terry Kinney, Jeff Perry, and Gary Sinise, took its name from the novel.
- The lengthy track "Steppenwolf" appears on English rock band Hawkwind's album Astounding Sounds, Amazing Music and is directly inspired by the novel, including references to the magic theatre and the dual nature of the wolfman-manwolf (lutocost). Robert Calvert initially wrote and performed the lyrics on "Distances Between Us" by Adrian Wagner in 1974. The song also appears on later, live Hawkwind CDs and DVDs.
- Danish acid rock band Steppeulvene also took its name from the novel.
- The song Magic Dragon Theater from Utopia's 1977 album RA, by Todd Rundgren and Kasim Sulton, alludes to Harry Haller's visit to the Magic Theater.
- "He Was a Steppenwolf" is a song by Boney M. from the album Nightflight to Venus.
- Zbigniew Brzezinski includes a quotation from Steppenwolf as an epigraph to his 1970 book Between Two Ages.
- The United States of America's eponymous album features the track "The American Metaphysical Circus", which has lyrical references to the novel ("And the price is right/The cost of one admission is your mind").
- Be Here Now (1971), by Ram Dass, contains an illustration of a door bearing a sign that reads "Magic Theatre – For Madmen Only – Price of Admission – Your Mind". This references an invitation that Harry Haller receives to attend an "Anarchist Evening at the Magic Theatre, For Madmen Only, Price of Admission Your Mind".
- The Black Ice, by Michael Connelly, has J. Michael Haller making a reference to the author when he says that, if his illegitimate son took his surname, he would be "Harry Haller" instead of Harry Bosch.
- French singer Alizée sings her song "Gourmandises" to "le loup des steppes", literally "the wolf of the steppes" (2001).
- The high school team in Pretty Little Liars: Original Sin are the Steppenwolves.
- A character named Steppenwolf was created by Jack Kirby for his DC Comics "Fourth World" saga, and appears in the film Zack Snyder's Justice League.
- The composer and trombonist Christian Lindberg wrote a viola concerto subtitled Steppenwolf in 2011. It was recorded on BIS Records in 2018.
- The Hungarian hip-hop producer, singer-songwriter, drummer, film director and animator HOLI released a song titled "Pusztai Farkas" ["Steppenwolf"] on his second album, "Levegő" ["Air"] in 2024, which has lyrical references to the novel.
- The Steppenwolf novel is an influence to the main character in the film Mall (2014).

== See also ==
- Caledonian Antisyzygy
