= 36th Berlin International Film Festival =

1986 film festival in West Berlin, Germany

- Festival poster
- Opening film: Ginger and Fred
- Location: West Berlin, Germany
- Founded: 1951
- Awards: Golden Bear: Stammheim
- No. of films: 313 films
- Festival date: 14–25 February 1986
- Website: http://www.berlinale.de

Berlin International Film Festival chronology
- 37th 35th

The 36th annual Berlin International Film Festival was held 14–25 February 1986. The festival opened with Ginger and Fred by Federico Fellini, which played out of competition at the festival.

The Golden Bear was awarded to West German film Stammheim directed by Reinhard Hauff. The retrospective was in honour of German actress and film producer Henny Porten and the homage was dedicated to American film director Fred Zinnemann. Claude Lanzmann's 9 hour long documentary film Shoah about The Holocaust was screened at the Young Filmmakers Forum (renamed the International Forum of New Cinema in 1987).

== Juries ==
=== Main Competition ===
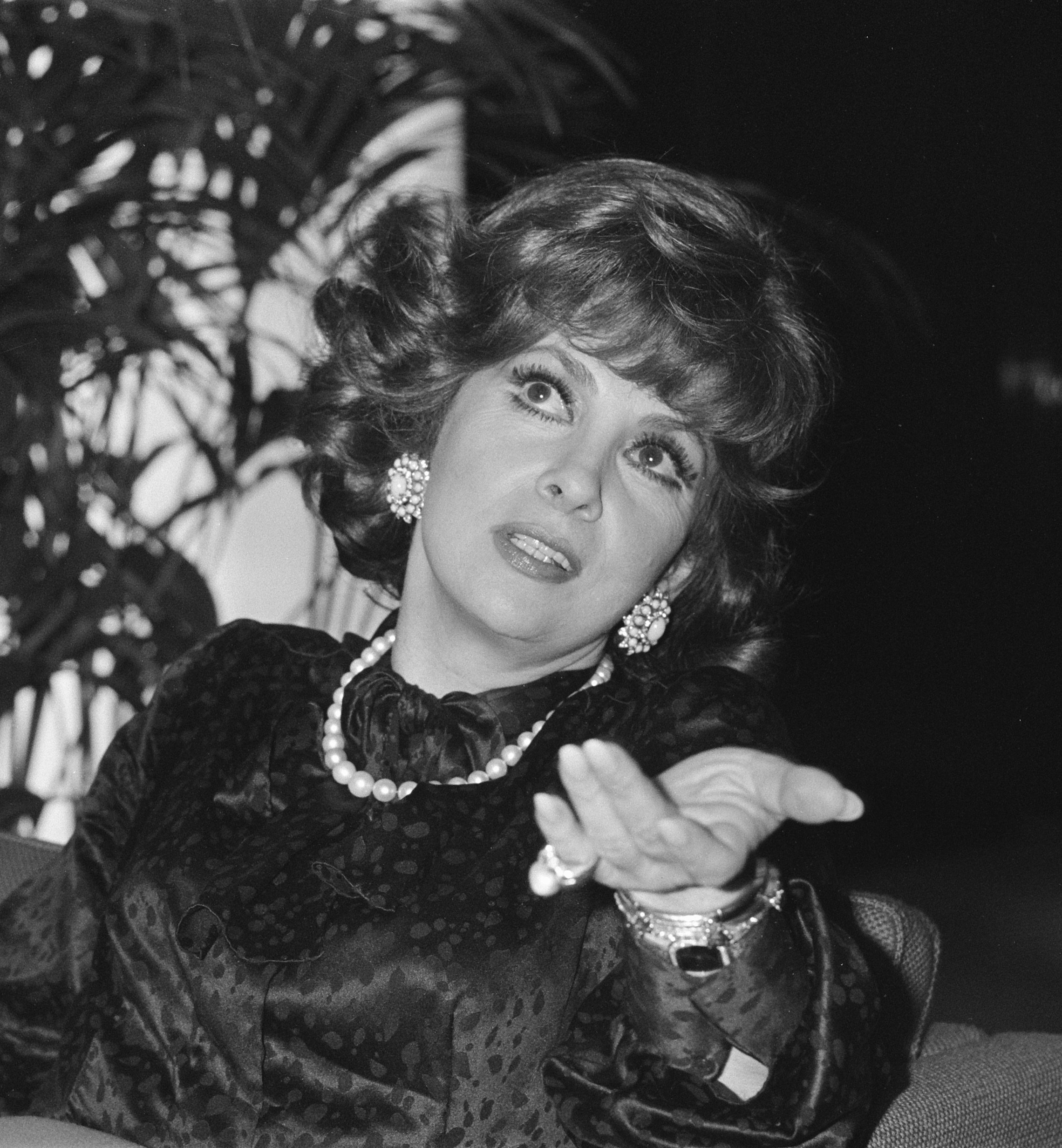
Gina Lollobrigida, Jury President

The following people were announced as being on the jury for the festival:

- Gina Lollobrigida, Italian actress - Jury President
- Rudi Fehr, British editor
- Lindsay Anderson, British filmmaker
- August Coppola, American academic
- Werner Grassmann, West-German producer and filmmaker
- Otar Iosseliani, Soviet filmmaker
- Norbert Kückelmann, West-German filmmaker
- Françoise Maupin, French journalist and film critic
- Rosaura Revueltas, Mexican actress
- Naoki Togawa, Japanese film critic
- Jerzy Toeplitz, Polish writer and co-founder of Polska Szkoła Filmowa

== Official Sections ==
=== In Competition ===
The following films were in competition for the Golden Bear:

English title	Original title	Director(s)	Production Country
Anne Trister		Léa Pool	Canada
At Close Range		James Foley	United States
The Berlin Affair	Interno Berlinese	Liliana Cavani	Italy, West Germany
Camorra	Un complicato intrigo di donne, vicoli e delitti	Lina Wertmüller	Italy
Caravaggio		Derek Jarman	United Kingdom
Dawn	L'Aube	Miklós Jancsó	France, Israel
Flight North	Flucht in den Norden	Ingemo Engström	West Germany, Finland
Gilsoddeum	길소뜸	Im Kwon-taek	South Korea
Gonza the Spearman	近松門左衛門 鑓の権三	Masahiro Shinoda	Japan
Heidenlöcher		Wolfram Paulus	Austria, West Germany
Hour of the Star	A Hora da Estrela	Suzana Amaral	Brazil
The House on the River	Das Haus am Fluß	Roland Gräf	East Germany
The Journey of a Young Composer	ახალგაზრდა კომპოზიტორის მოგზაურობა	Georgiy Shengelaya	Soviet Union
Love Me!	Älska mej	Kay Pollak	Sweden
Mania	Μανία	Giorgos Panousopoulos	Greece
The Mass Is Ended	La messa è finita	Nanni Moretti	Italy
My Brother-in-law Killed My Sister	Mon beau-frère a tué ma sœur	Jacques Rouffio	France
My Darling, My Darling	Skapa moya, skapi moy	Eduard Zahariev	Hungary, Bulgaria
My First Two Hundred Years	Első kétszáz évem	Gyula Maár	Hungary
Paso Doble	Pas în doi	Dan Pița	Romania
Red Kiss	Rouge Baiser	Véra Belmont	France, West Germany
The Smile of the Lamb	חיוך הגדי	Shimon Dotan	Israel
Stammheim		Reinhard Hauff	West Germany
Teo el pelirrojo		Paco Lucio	Spain
Trouble in Mind		Alan Rudolph	United States

=== Out of competition ===
- Ginger and Fred, directed by Federico Fellini (Italy, France, West Germany)
- Heilt Hitler!, directed by Herbert Achternbusch (West Germany)
- Out of Africa, directed by Sydney Pollack (United States)
- L'Unique, directed by Jérôme Diamant-Berger (France)
- The Journey of Natty Gann, directed by Jeremy Kagan (United States)
- To Live and Die in L.A., directed by William Friedkin (United States)
- Karin's Face, directed by Ingmar Bergman (Sweden)

=== Retrospective ===
The following films were shown in the retrospective in honour of Henny Porten:

English title	Original title	Director(s)	Country
24 Hours in the Life of a Woman	24 Stunden aus dem Leben einer Frau	Robert Land	Germany
Alexandra		Curt A. Stark	Germany
Anna Boleyn		Ernst Lubitsch	Germany
Carola Lamberti – Eine vom Zirkus		Hans Müller	East Germany
Christa Hartungen		Rudolf Biebrach	Germany
The Ancient Law	Das alte Gesetz	E. A. Dupont	Germany
The Beggar Student	Der Bettelstudent	Franz Porten	Germany
Der Müller und sein Kind		Adolf Gärtner	Germany
Der Optimist		E. W. Emo	Germany
Der Schatten des Meeres		Curt A. Stark	Germany
The Blue Lantern	Die blaue Laterne	Rudolf Biebrach	Germany
The Lady, the Devil and the Model	Die Dame, der Teufel und die Probiermamsell	Rudolf Biebrach	Germany
The Vulture Wally	Die Geierwally	E. A. Dupont	Germany
The Long Intermission	Die große Pause	Carl Froelich	Germany
The Buchholz Family	Familie Buchholz	Carl Froelich	Germany
Funiculi-Funicula		Franz Porten	Germany
Hann, Hein und Henny!		Rudolf Biebrach	Germany
Backstairs	Hintertreppe	Leopold Jessner and Paul Leni	Germany
Kohlhiesel's Daughters	Kohlhiesels Töchter	Ernst Lubitsch	Germany
The Comedians	Komödianten	G. W. Pabst	Germany
Künstlerliebe		Adolf Gärtner	Germany
Lotte		Carl Froelich	Germany
Louise, Queen of Prussia	Luise, Königin von Preußen	Carl Froelich	Germany
Meissner Porzellan		Franz Porten	Germany
Mother and Child	Mutter und Kind	Hans Steinhoff	Germany
Marriage of Affection	Neigungsehe	Carl Froelich	Germany
Rose Bernd		Alfred Halm	Germany
Scandalous Eva	Skandal um Eva	G. W. Pabst	Germany
Tragödie eines Streiks		Adolf Gärtner	Germany
Um Haaresbreite		Curt A. Stark	Germany
Verkannt		(unknown)	Germany
Escape	Zuflucht	Carl Froelich	Germany

The following films were shown in the homage dedicated to Fred Zinnemann:

English title	Original title	Director(s)	Country
Act of Violence		Fred Zinnemann	United States
A Hatful of Rain		Fred Zinnemann	United States
A Man for All Seasons		Fred Zinnemann	United States
Behold a Pale Horse		Fred Zinnemann	United States
Benjy		Fred Zinnemann	United States
The Day of the Jackal		Fred Zinnemann	United Kingdom, France
Eyes in the Night		Fred Zinnemann	United States
Fishermen's Nets	Redes	Fred Zinnemann and Emilio Gómez Muriel	Mexico
Five Days One Summer		Fred Zinnemann	United States
Forbidden Passage		Fred Zinnemann	United States
From Here to Eternity		Fred Zinnemann	United States
High Noon		Fred Zinnemann	United States
Julia		Fred Zinnemann	United States
Kid Glove Killer		Fred Zinnemann	United States
The Member of the Wedding		Fred Zinnemann	United States
The Men		Fred Zinnemann	United States
The Nun's Story		Fred Zinnemann	United States
Oklahoma!		Fred Zinnemann	United States
The Search		Fred Zinnemann	United States, Switzerland
The Seventh Cross		Fred Zinnemann	United States
The Story of Doctor Carver		Fred Zinnemann	United States
The Sundowners		Fred Zinnemann	United States
Teresa		Fred Zinnemann	United States
That Mothers Might Live		Fred Zinnemann	United States
While America Sleeps		Fred Zinnemann	United States

The film Le Brasier ardent by Ivan Mosjoukine and Alexandre Volkoff was also shown in the retrospective as a tribute to the Cinémathèque Française for its 50th anniversary.

== Official Awards ==
=== Main Competition ===
The following prizes were awarded by the Jury:

- Golden Bear: Stammheim by Reinhard Hauff
- Silver Bear – Special Jury Prize: The Mass Is Ended by Nanni Moretti
- Silver Bear for Best Director: Georgiy Shengelaya for The Journey of a Young Composer
- Silver Bear for Best Actress:
  - Charlotte Valandrey for Red Kiss
  - Marcélia Cartaxo for Hour of the Star
- Silver Bear for Best Actor: Tuncel Kurtiz for The Smile of the Lamb
- Silver Bear for an outstanding single achievement: Caravaggio by Derek Jarman
- Silver Bear for an outstanding artistic contribution: Gonza the Spearman by Masahiro Shinoda
- Honourable Mention: Pas în doi by Dan Pița

== Independent Awards ==
=== FIPRESCI Award ===
- Stammheim by Reinhard Hauff
