= Autran Dourado =

Brazilian novelist (1926–2012)

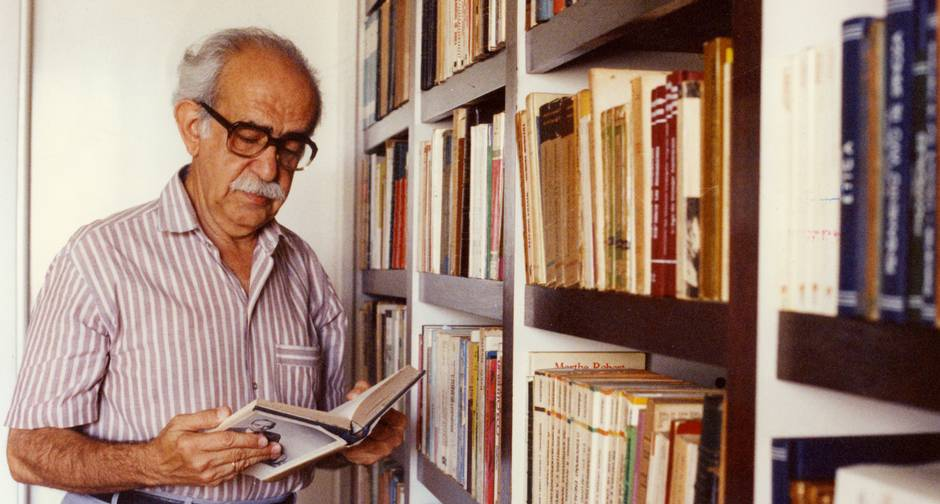
- Born: Waldomiro Freitas Autran Dourado; January 18, 1926; Patos de Minas, Brazil
- Died: September 30, 2012 (aged 86); Rio de Janeiro, Brazil
- Education: Federal University of Minas Gerais
- Occupations: Author; Journalist; Novelist
- Writing career
- Notable works: Ópera dos Mortos; A barca dos homens; O risco do bordado; Sinos da Agonia; Um artista aprendiz
- Notable awards: Camões Prize (2000)

Waldomiro Freitas Autran Dourado (1926 – September 30, 2012) was a Brazilian novelist.

Dourado was born in Patos de Minas, state of Minas Gerais. Going against current trends in Brazilian literature, Dourado's works display much concern with literary form, with many obscure words and expressions. Minas Gerais is the setting for most of Dourado's books, resembling the early to mid-20th century regionalist trend in Brazilian literature. Most literary critics consider Dourado's work to have similarities to Baroque literature.

In 1982, Dourado won the Jabuti Prize.

In 2000, Dourado won the Camões Prize, the most important literary prize in the Portuguese language.

In 2001, Brazilian filmmaker Suzana Amaral released the film Uma Vida em Segredo. It was based on the novel of same title by Autran Dourado.

Dourado died of stomach bleeding on September 30, 2012, in Rio de Janeiro. He was 86 years old.

== Selected novels ==
- Uma Vida em Segredo 1964 - translated as A Hidden Life
- Ópera dos Mortos 1967 - translated as Voices of the Dead
- O Risco do Bordado 1970 - translated as Pattern for a Tapestry
- Os Sinos da Agonia 1974 - translated as Bells of Agony
- Ópera dos Fantoches 1995
- As Imaginações Pecaminosas (Jabuti Prize 1982)
- A Serviço Del-Rei 1984
- Confissões de Narciso 1997

Novels with English translations are posted above with their American titles.

== Reviews ==
- McCabe, Brian (1981), review of The Voices of the Dead, in Cencrastus No. 6, Autumn 1981, p. 42
