= Gina Lollobrigida =

Italian actress (1927–2023)

Gina Lollobrigida OMRI
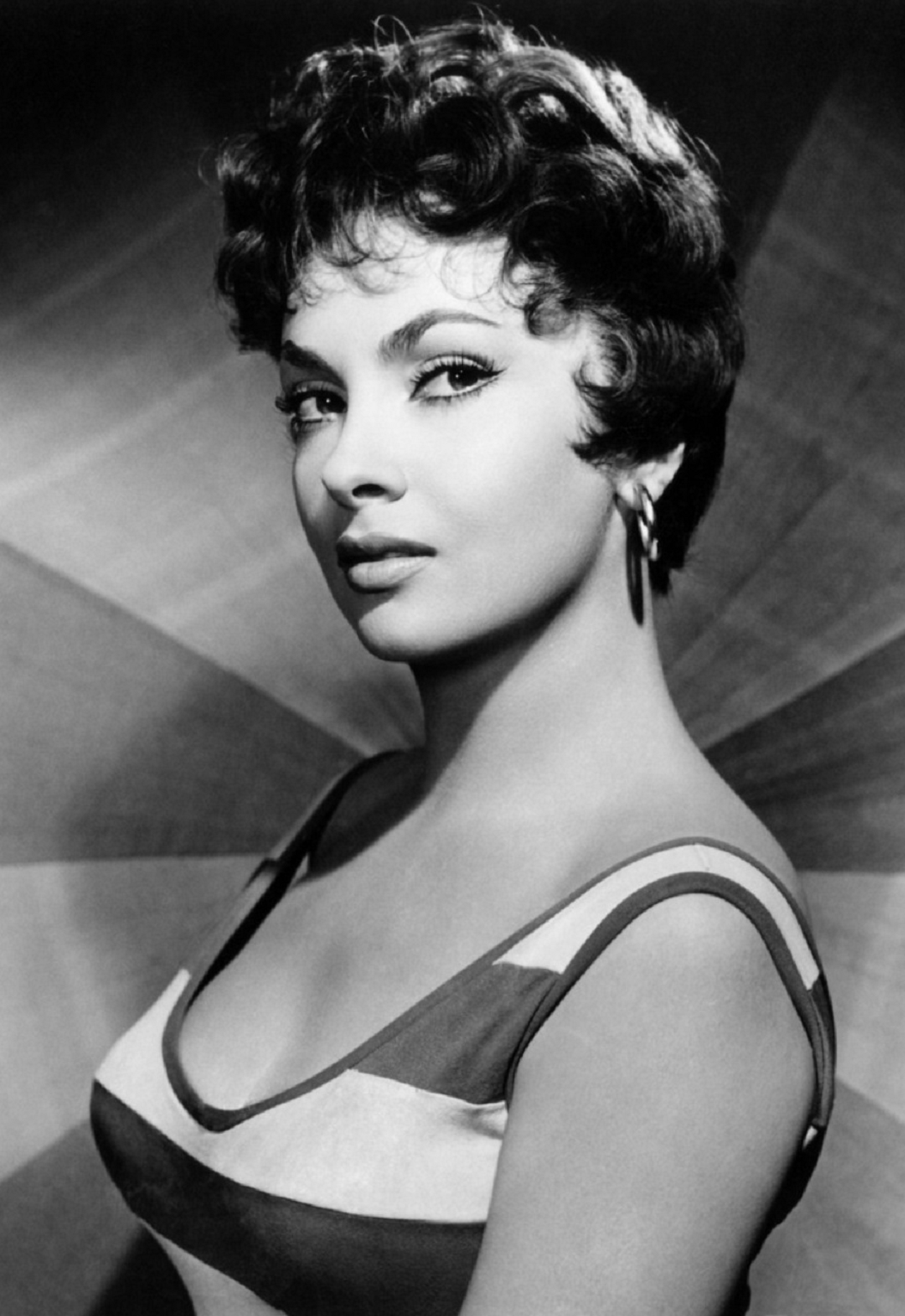
- Publicity still for Trapeze (1956)
- Born: Luigia Lollobrigida; 4 July 1927; Subiaco, Kingdom of Italy
- Died: 16 January 2023 (aged 95); Rome, Italy
- Resting place: Municipal Cemetery, Subiaco
- Occupations: Actress; model; photojournalist
- Years active: 1946–1997
- Spouse: Milko Škofič (m. 1949; div. 1971)
- Partner: Javier Rigau y Rafols (1984–2006)
- Children: 1
- Relatives: Guido Lollobrigida (cousin); Francesca Lollobrigida (great-niece); Francesco Lollobrigida (second cousin once removed)
- Awards: Order of Merit of the Italian Republic; Legion of Honour; Ordre des Arts et des Lettres

Signature
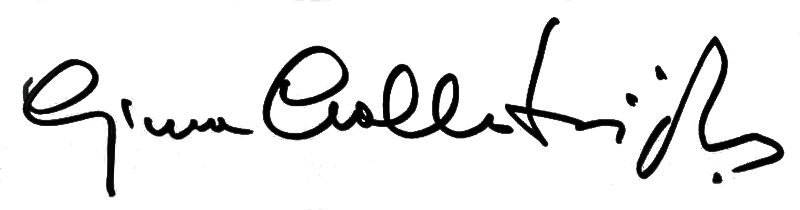

Luigia "Gina" Lollobrigida (Note: Italian pronunciation: [luˈiːdʒa ˈdʒiːna ˌlɔlloˈbriːdʒida].) (4 July 1927 – 16 January 2023) was an Italian actress, model, photojournalist, and sculptor. She was one of the highest-profile European actresses of the 1950s and 1960s, a period in which she was an international sex symbol and was dubbed "the most beautiful woman in the world". Nicknamed "la Bersagliera" in her country after her famed role in Bread, Love and Dreams as well as her combative character, at the time of her death she was among the last surviving high-profile international actors from the Golden Age of Hollywood cinema.

As her film career slowed, Lollobrigida established a second career as a photojournalist. In the 1970s she achieved a scoop by gaining access to Fidel Castro for an exclusive interview.

Lollobrigida continued as an active supporter of Italian and Italian-American causes, particularly the National Italian American Foundation (NIAF). In 2008 she received the NIAF Lifetime Achievement Award at the Foundation's Anniversary Gala. In 2013, she sold her jewellery collection and donated the nearly US$5 million from the sale to benefit stem-cell therapy research. She won the Henrietta Award at the 18th Golden Globe Awards.

== Youth ==
Luigia Lollobrigida was born in Subiaco, Lazio, about 64 kilometres (40 mi) from Rome, the daughter of a furniture maker and his wife. She had three sisters: Giuliana, Maria and Fernanda. After the end of World War II in 1945, the family moved to Rome, where Lollobrigida took singing lessons, did some modelling, and participated in several beauty contests, placing third in the 1947 Miss Italy contest.

== Acting career ==
In 1945 at age 18, Lollobrigida played a part in the comedy Na Santarella by Eduardo Scarpetta at the Teatro della Concordia of Monte Castello di Vibio, the smallest theatre all'italiana in the world.

=== Film ===
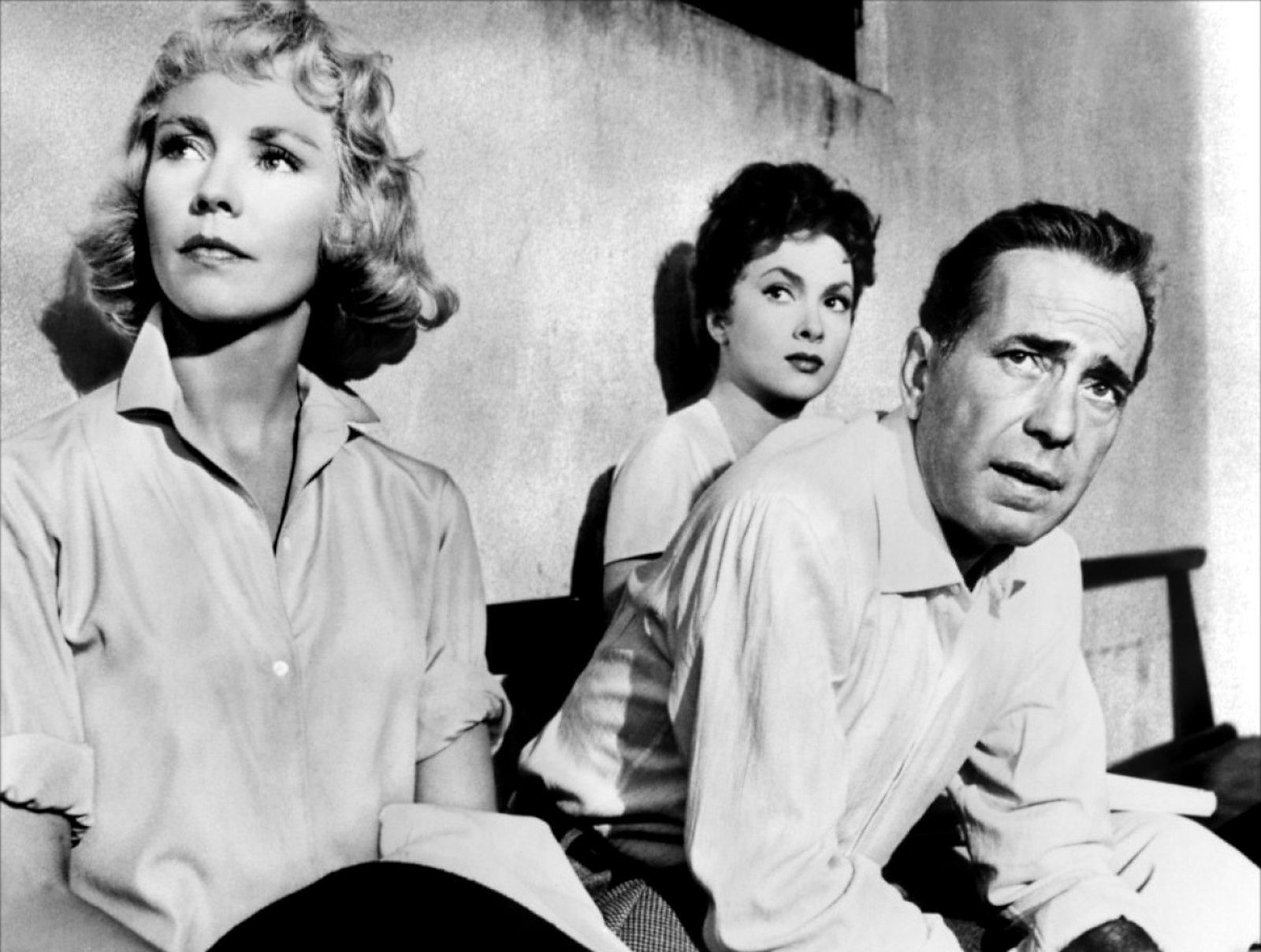
Film still image of Jennifer Jones, Lollobrigida and Humphrey Bogart in Beat the Devil (1953)

In 1946, she began appearing in Italian films in minor roles. In 1950, Howard Hughes signed Lollobrigida on a preliminary seven-year contract to make three pictures a year. She refused the final terms of the contract, preferring to remain in Europe, and Hughes suspended her. Despite selling RKO Pictures in 1955, Hughes retained Lollobrigida's contract. The dispute prevented her from working in American movies filmed in the U.S. until 1959, but allowed for American productions shot in Europe, although Hughes often threatened legal action against the producers.

Her performance in the Italian romantic comedy Bread, Love and Dreams (Pane, amore e fantasia, 1953) led to its becoming a box-office success and her receiving a BAFTA nomination. Furthermore, she won a Nastro d'Argento award from the Italian National Syndicate of Film Journalists for her role in the picture. Lollobrigida appeared in The Wayward Wife (1953) and in Woman of Rome (1954). These were three of her most renowned Italian films, but she worked also in the French industry on such films as Fearless Little Soldier (Fanfan la Tulipe, 1952), Beauties of the Night (Les Belles de nuit, 1952), and Flesh and the Woman (Le Grand Jeu, 1954).

Her first widely seen English-language film, Beat the Devil (1953), was shot in Italy, and directed by John Huston. In this film she played the wife of Humphrey Bogart, with Jennifer Jones and Robert Morley as her costars. She then took part in the Italian-American production Crossed Swords (1954), co-starring with Errol Flynn. Her performance in The World's Most Beautiful Woman (also known as Beautiful But Dangerous, 1955) led to her receiving the first David di Donatello Award for Best Actress. In this movie Lollobrigida played Italian soprano Lina Cavalieri and sang all the songs in the movie, including arias from Tosca, in her own voice. She played the principal female lead in the circus drama Trapeze (1956) directed by Carol Reed and co-starring with Burt Lancaster and Tony Curtis and in The Hunchback of Notre Dame (1956) appeared as Esmeralda with Anthony Quinn as Quasimodo. The film was directed by Jean Delannoy.

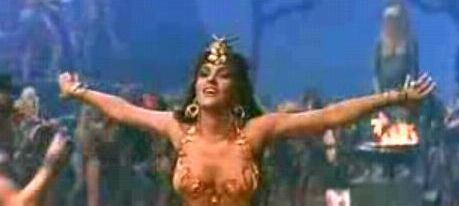
Lollobrigida in Solomon and Sheba (1959)

She appeared in the French movie The Law (1959), alongside Yves Montand and Marcello Mastroianni; then, she co-starred with Frank Sinatra in Never So Few (1959) and with Yul Brynner in Solomon and Sheba (1959).

In the romantic comedy Come September (1961), Lollobrigida had a leading role along with Rock Hudson, Sandra Dee, and Bobby Darin. It was a film for which she won a Golden Globe Award. She appeared, also in 1961, with Ernest Borgnine and Anthony Franciosa in the drama Go Naked in the World.

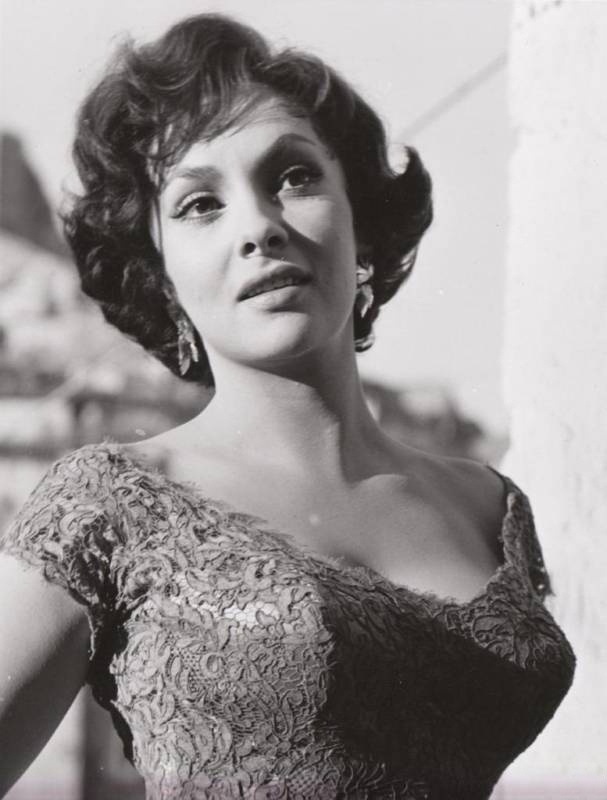
Lollobrigida in a publicity photo, early 1960s

She attended the 1961 Academy Awards ceremony, hosted by Bob Hope, delivering the Academy Award for Best Director to Billy Wilder for the film The Apartment.

Jean Delannoy then directed her again, this time in Venere Imperiale (1962). She co-starred with Stephen Boyd and again received the Nastro d'Argento and David di Donatello awards. She co-starred with Sean Connery in the thriller Woman of Straw (1964), with Rock Hudson again in Strange Bedfellows (1965), and appeared with Alec Guinness in Hotel Paradiso (1966).

Lollobrigida starred in Buona Sera, Mrs. Campbell (1968) with Shelley Winters, Phil Silvers, Peter Lawford, and Telly Savalas. For this role, she was nominated for a Golden Globe Award and won a third David di Donatello award. Lollobrigida co-starred with Bob Hope in the comedy The Private Navy of Sgt. O'Farrell (1968) and also accompanied Hope on his visits to military troops overseas.

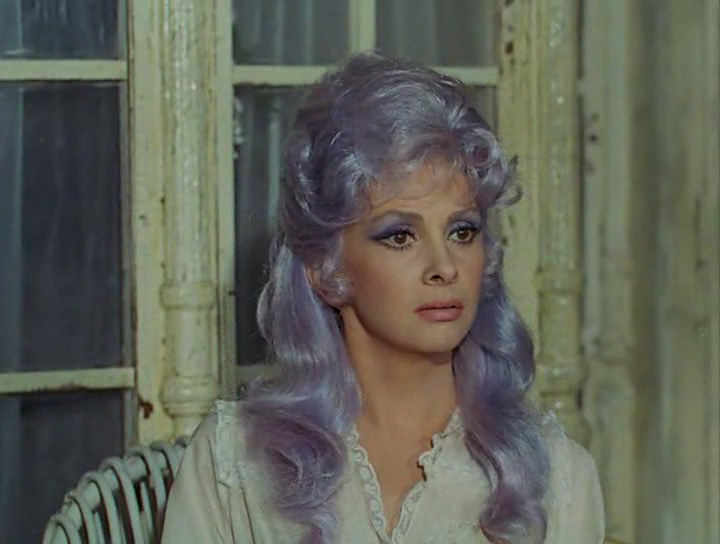
Lollobrigida as The Fairy with Turquoise Hair in the TV series The Adventures of Pinocchio (1972)

During this stage of her career, she rejected roles in many films, including Lady L (1965), directed by George Cukor, due to conflicts with Cukor (the leading role then went to Sophia Loren); Five Branded Women (1960), directed by Martin Ritt (the leading role went to Silvana Mangano); and The Lady Without Camelias (1953), directed by Michelangelo Antonioni (the leading role went to Lucia Bosè). She later revealed regret for having refused a supporting role in La Dolce Vita (1960). The film's director, Federico Fellini, wanted to cast her in the film but, she explained, proposed projects were arriving too often at the time and her husband accidentally misplaced the script.

By the 1970s, her film career had slowed down, and she began focusing on photography. She appeared in King, Queen, Knave (1972), co-starring with David Niven. In 1973, she was a member of the jury at the 8th Moscow International Film Festival.

=== Television ===
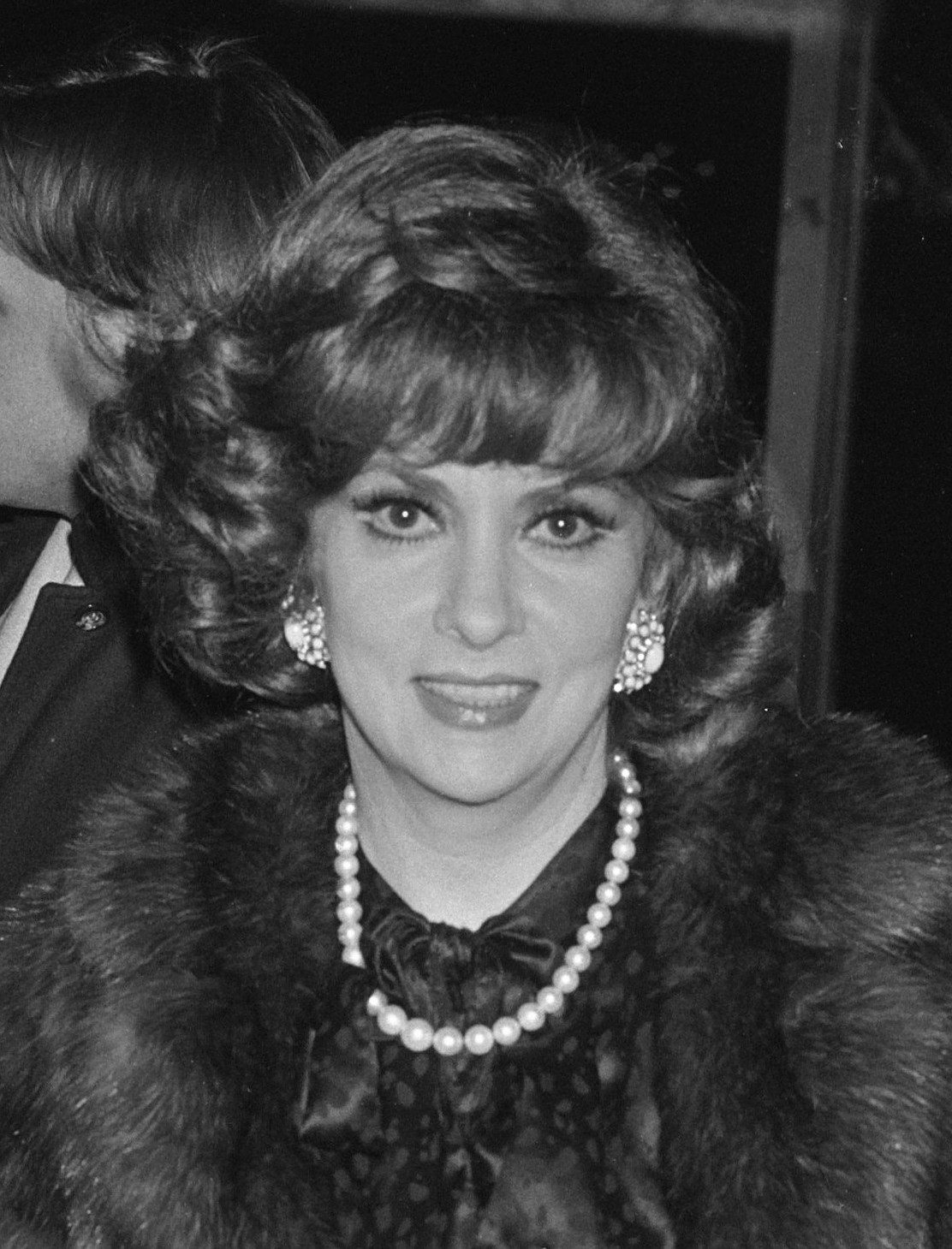
Lollobrigida in 1980

In the mid-1980s, she guest starred in a multi-episode arc on the television series Falcon Crest as Francesca Gioberti, a role originally written for Sophia Loren, who had turned it down. For the role, she received a third Golden Globe nomination. She also had a supporting role in the 1985 television miniseries Deceptions, co-starring with Stefanie Powers. The following year, she appeared as a guest star in the TV series The Love Boat.

== Judging ==
In 1986, she was invited to head the jury at the 36th Berlin International Film Festival, which awarded the Golden Bear to Reinhard Hauff's film Stammheim. She said the majority decision was "prefabricated", and opposed it. In 1997 she was in the jury at Film Fest Gent and similarly distanced herself from the Grand Prix winner The Witman Boys, which she deemed 'immoral'.

== Photojournalism ==
By the end of the 1970s, Lollobrigida had embarked on what she developed into a successful second career as a photographic journalist. She photographed, among others, Paul Newman, Salvador Dalí, Henry Kissinger, David Cassidy, Audrey Hepburn, Ella Fitzgerald, and the Germany national football team. In 1974 she obtained an exclusive interview with Fidel Castro. Between 1972 and 1994 she published six collections of her photographs, including the 1973 title Italia Mia.

== Politics ==
In 1999, Lollobrigida unsuccessfully ran for election to the European Parliament as a candidate for The Democrats, a party led by Romano Prodi. In 2020, she publicly endorsed Pope Francis' views on LGBT rights. In the 2022 Italian general election, Lollobrigida, at the age of 95, attempted to win a seat in the Senate of the Republic, by standing for election as candidate for the Sovereign and Popular Italy (ISP), a newly founded Eurosceptic alliance opposed to Mario Draghi, in Latina, Lazio. She was unsuccessful, as the party garnered only 1% of the constituency vote, below the 3% electoral threshold. In an interview with Corriere della Sera prior to the election, Lollobrigida said she was inspired by Mahatma Gandhi's "way of doing things". She stated she was close to Indira Gandhi.

== Personal life ==
In 1949, Lollobrigida married a Slovenian physician, Milko Škofič. Their only child, Andrea Milko (Milko Škofič Jr.), was born on 28 July 1957 in Salvator Mundi International Hospital in Rome. Škofič gave up the practice of medicine to become her manager. In 1960, Lollobrigida moved from her native Italy to Toronto, with Škofič and their son. The couple meant to solve the legal situation of their son who was considered stateless by the Italian bureaucracy. The couple divorced in 1971.

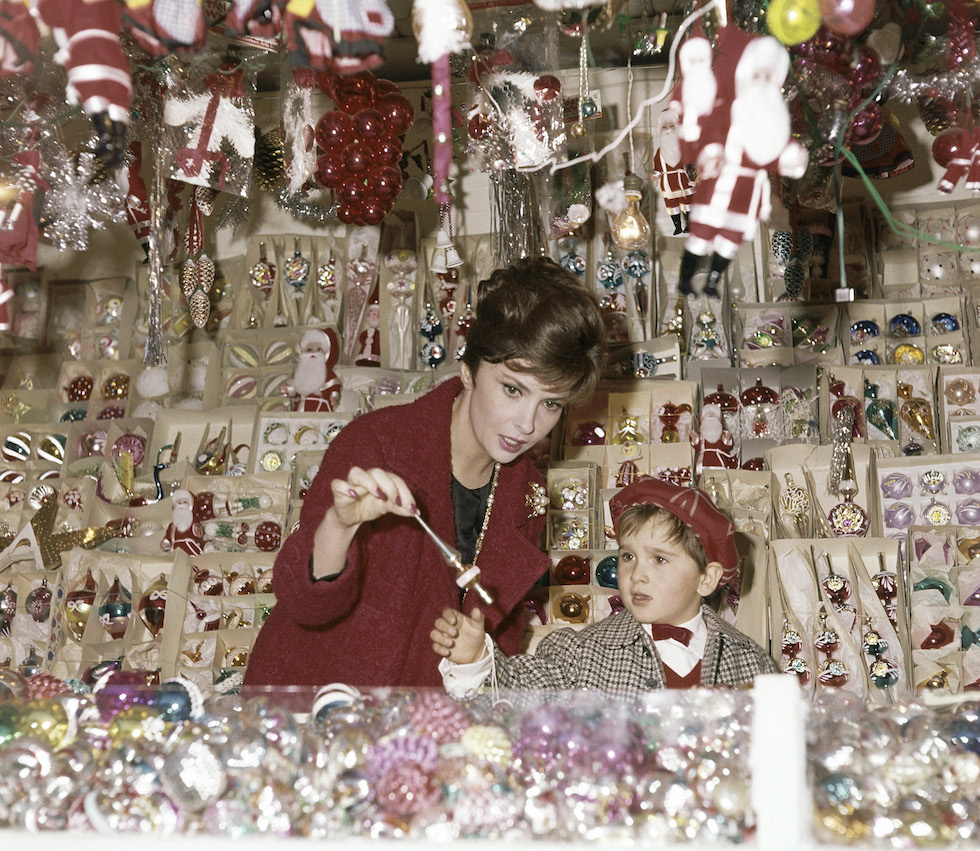
Lollobrigida and her son Andrea Milko at the Piazza Navona Christmas market in Rome, 1962

In October 2006, aged 79, she announced to Spain's ¡Hola! magazine her engagement to a 45-year-old Spanish businessman, Javier Rigau y Rafols (Catalan: Javier Rigau i Ràfols). They had met at a party in Monte Carlo in 1984 and had since become companions. The engagement was called off on 6 December 2006, reportedly because of the strain of intense media interest.

In 2006, Lollobrigida and Rigau signed a prenuptial agreement and married in Spain. In January 2013, she started legal action against Rigau, claiming that her ex-partner had staged a secret ceremony in which he "married" an imposter pretending to be her at a registry office in Barcelona. She said he intended to lay claim to her estate after her death. Lollobrigida accused Rigau of fraud, saying that he had earlier obtained the legal right to act on her behalf with a power of attorney, and carried out the plot to get extra power. "A while ago he convinced me to give him my power of attorney. He needed it for some legal affairs. But instead, I fear that he took advantage of the fact that I don't understand Spanish ... Who knows what he had me sign." In March 2017, she lost her court action, but subsequently said that she would appeal.

Lollobrigida had a habit of referring to herself in the third person.

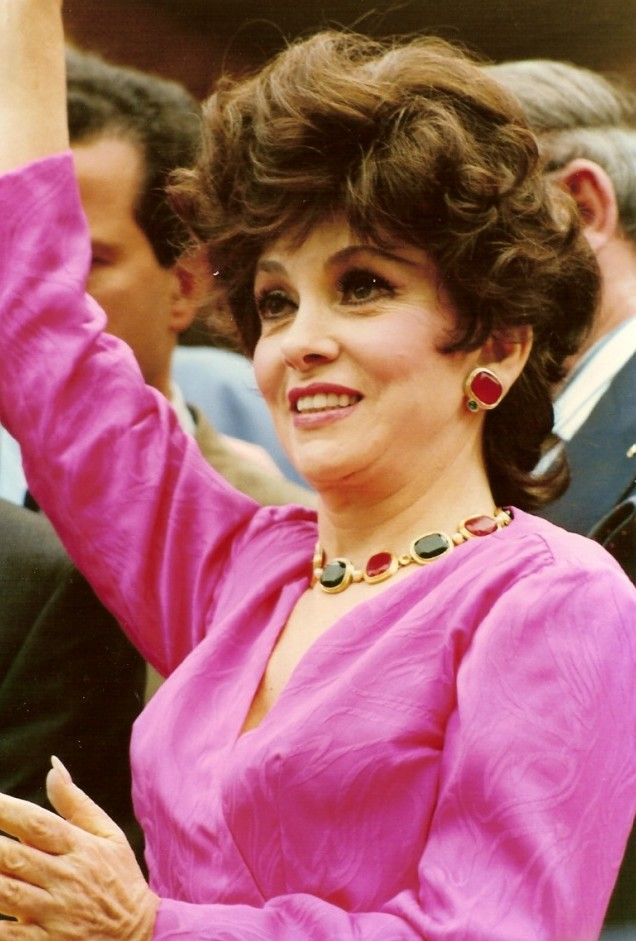
Lollobrigida in 1991

Lollobrigida retired from filming in 1997. She told PARADE in April 2000: "I studied painting and sculpting at school and became an actress by mistake ... I've had many lovers and still have romances. I am very spoiled. All my life, I've had too many admirers." After retirement she divided her time between her house on Via Appia Antica in Rome and a villa in Monte Carlo. After 2009, she refused visitors to her home.

In 2013, Lollobrigida sold her jewelry collection through Sotheby's. She donated nearly $5 million to benefit stem-cell therapy.

In 2019, the Roman Rota, with the consent of Pope Francis, issued a declaration of nullity for Lollobrigida's marriage to Rigau after a two-year review.

At the end of the 2010s, Andrea Piazzolla became Lollobrigida's main collaborator, general director and trustee of some Monegasque real estate and financial societies. In July 2020 he was charged for circumvention of an incapable person.

In 2021, the Italian Supreme Court of Cassation, at the request of her son, ruled that Lollobrigida should have a legal guardian appointed to manage her affairs and prevent predation. Although the court determined she was mentally capable, medical evidence had indicated that there was "a weakening in her correct perception of reality" and that she was in a state of "vulnerability".

Lollobrigida died aged 95, at a clinic in Rome on 16 January 2023. She was buried in her birthplace, Subiaco, Lazio.

The lawyer and politician, and current Minister of Agriculture of Italy, Francesco Lollobrigida, is her great-nephew.

In 2022, sports media noted that Olympic speed skating gold medalist Francesca Lollobrigida is her great-niece, and the two had met.

In November 2023, Andrea Piazzolla, who in 2009 aged 21 had begun working for Lollobrigida as a factotum, was convicted of embezzling Lollobrigida's millions. Piazzolla was jailed for three years.

== Awards and nominations ==
Lollobrigida won three David di Donatello, two Nastro d'Argento, and six Bambi awards. She was nominated three times for the Golden Globe and won once in 1961 as World Film Favorite– Female. She was nominated once for a BAFTA award.

In 1985, she was nominated as an officer of France's Ordre des Arts et des Lettres by Jack Lang, for her achievements in photography and sculpture.

In 1987 she was appointed a Grand Officer of the Order of Merit of the Italian Republic.

Lollobrigida was awarded the Légion d'honneur by François Mitterrand.

On 16 October 1999, Lollobrigida was nominated as a Goodwill Ambassador of the UN Food and Agriculture Organization.

On 1 February 2018, Lollobrigida received a star on the Hollywood Walk of Fame.

== Books ==
- Italia mia (1973) – a collection of photographs across Italy
- The Philippines (1976) – a collection of photographs across the Philippines
- Wonder of Innocence (1994) – a book of photographs
- Sculptures (2003)
- Gina Lollobrigida Photographer (2009) – a book of her photography
- Gina Lollobrigida "Vissi D'Arte" (2008) – a book of her sculptures and some of her drawings and paintings

== Filmography ==
=== Film ===
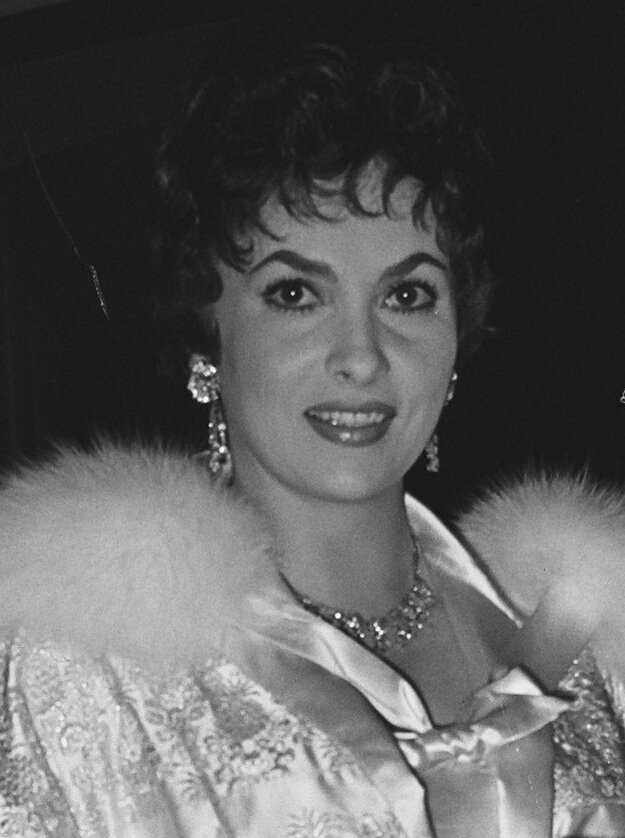
Lollobrigida in 1955

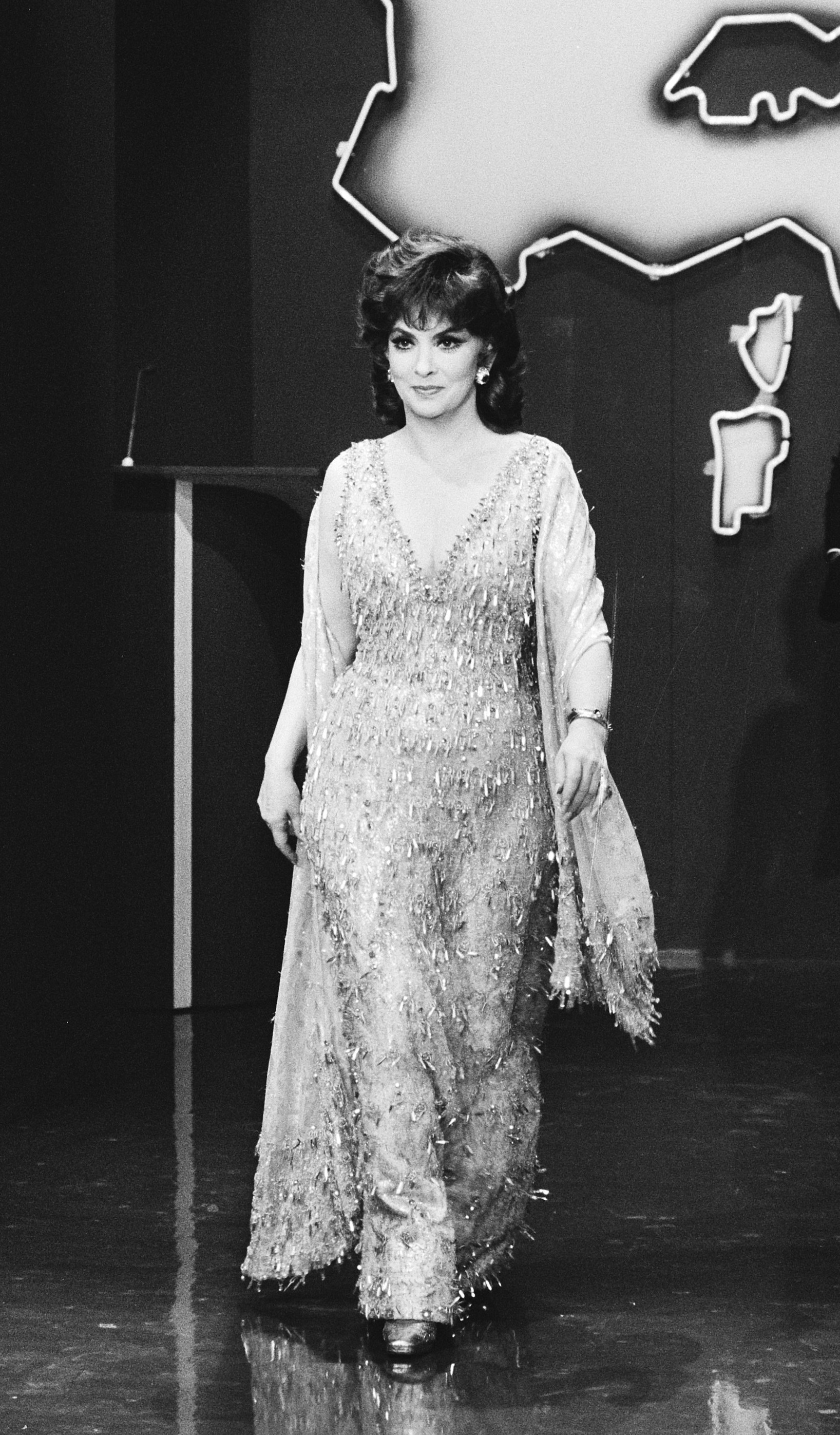
Lollobrigida in 1979

Year	Film	Role	Notes
1946	Lucia di Lammermoor		
1946	This Wine of Love		
1946	Black Eagle	Girl at party	
1947	When Love Calls		
1947	Pagliacci	Nedda	
1947	Flesh Will Surrender	Dancer	
1947	A Man About the House	Young girl	
1948	Mad About Opera	Dora	
1949	Alarm Bells	Agostina	
1949	The Bride Can't Wait	Donata Venturi	
1949	The White Line	Donata Sebastian	
1950	A Dog's Life	Rita Buton	
1950	My Beautiful Daughter	Lisetta Minneci	
1950	Alina	Alina	
1951	A Tale of Five Cities	Maria Severini	
1951	The Young Caruso	Stella	
1951	Four Ways Out	Daniela	
1951	Love I Haven't... But... But	Gina	
1951	Attention! Bandits!	Anna	
1952	Wife For a Night (Moglie per una notte)	Ottavia	
1952	Times Gone By	Mariantonia Desiderio	
1952	Fanfan la Tulipe	Adeline La Franchise	
1952	Beauties of the Night	Leila, Cashier	
1953	The Wayward Wife	Gemma Vagnuzzi	
1953	Bread, Love and Dreams	Maria De Ritis	Nominated – BAFTA Award for Best Foreign Actress; Nastro d'Argento for Best Actress
1953	The Unfaithfuls	Lulla Possenti	
1953	Beat the Devil	Maria Dannreuther	USA-UK-Italy
1953	Boum sur Paris	Herself	
1954	Woman of Rome	Adriana	
1954	Bread, Love and Jealousy	Maria De Ritis	
1954	Crossed Swords	Francesca	
1954	Le Grand Jeu	Sylvia Sorrego, Helena Ricci	
1955	Beautiful but Dangerous	Lina Cavalieri	David di Donatello for Best Actress
1956	Trapeze	Lola	
1956	The Hunchback of Notre Dame	Esmeralda	
1958	Anna of Brooklyn	Anna	
1959	The Law	Marietta	
1959	Never So Few	Carla Vesari	
1959	Solomon and Sheba	Queen of Sheba	
1961	Go Naked in the World	Giulietta Cameron	
1961	Come September	Lisa Helena Fellini	Golden Globe Henrietta Award, World Film Favorite – Female
1962	Lykke og krone (documentary)		
1962	La bellezza di Ippolita	Ippolita	
1963	Imperial Venus	Paulette Bonaparte	David di Donatello for Best Actress; Nastro d'Argento for Best Actress
1963	Mad Sea	Margherita	
1964	Woman of Straw	Maria Marcello	
1965	Me, Me, Me... and the Others	Titta	
1965	Le Bambole (The Dolls)	Beatrice	
1965	Strange Bedfellows	Toni Vincente	
1965	The Love Goddesses (documentary)		
1966	Pleasant Nights	Domicilla	
1966	The Sultans	Liza Bortoli	
1966	Hotel Paradiso	Marcelle Cotte	
1967	Cervantes	Giulia Toffolo	
1968	Stuntman	Evelyne Lake	
1968	Death Laid an Egg	Anna	
1968	The Private Navy of Sgt. O'Farrell	Maria	
1968	Buona Sera, Mrs. Campbell	Carla Campbell	Nominated – Golden Globe Award for Best Actress – Motion Picture Musical or Comedy; David di Donatello for Best Actress
1969	That Splendid November	Cettina	
1971	Bad Man's River	Alicia King	
1972	King, Queen, Knave	Martha Dreyer	
1973	The Lonely Woman	Netty	
1983	Wandering Stars (documentary)		
1995	One Hundred and One Nights	Professor Bébel's Wife	
1997	XXL	Gaby	
2011	Box Office 3D: The Filmest of Films	Herself	Cameo appearance

=== Television ===
Year	Film	Role	Notes
1958	Portrait of Gina (documentary)		Lost from 1958 until 1986, when it turned up in a storage unit of the Ritz Hotel, Paris, where director Orson Welles had left the only copy. Upon rediscovery, it was screened once at the 1986 Venice Film Festival, and once on German television, before Lollobrigida (who had seen the Venice screening) took legal action to have it banned, due to its unflattering portrayal of her as an ambitious young star.
1969	Rowan & Martin's Laugh-In	Herself	(2 episodes)
1972	The Adventures of Pinocchio	Fairy with Turquoise Hair	
1984	Falcon Crest	Francesca Gioberti	5 episodes Nominated – Golden Globe Award for Best Supporting Actress – Series, Miniseries or Television Film
1985	Deceptions	Princess Alessandra	Mini-series
1986	The Love Boat	Carla Lucci	Season 9, "The Christmas Cruise"
1988	Woman of Rome	Adriana's mother	3 episodes, television remake
1996	Una donna in fuga	Eleonora Riboldi	TV movie
