= Teatro della Concordia, Monte Castello di Vibio =

Teatro della Concordia
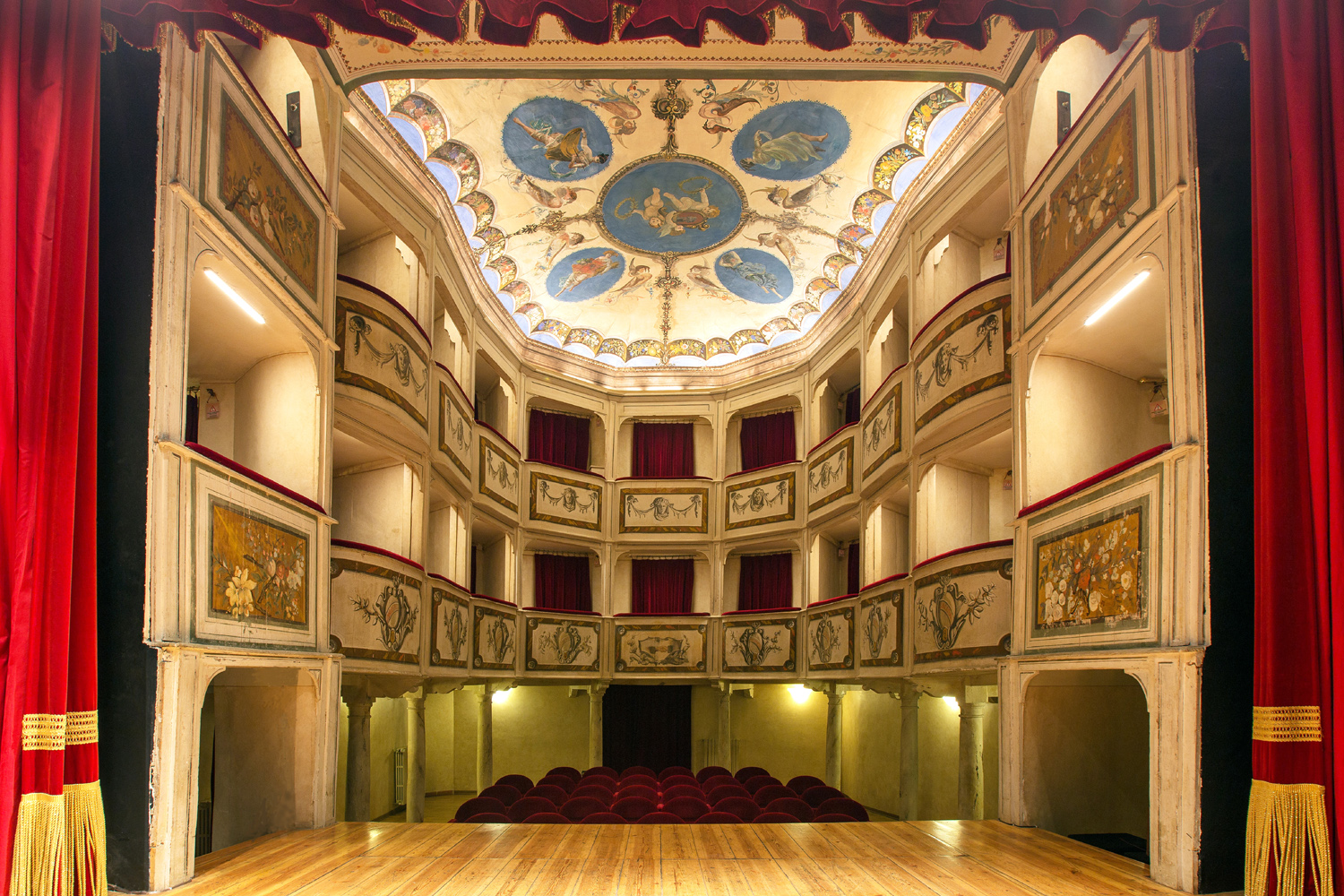
- Teatro della Concodia, auditorium
- Interactive map of Teatro della Concordia
- Address: Monte Castello di Vibio; Italy
- Coordinates: 42°50′27″N 12°21′07″E
- Owner: Municipality of Monte Castello di Vibio
- Capacity: 99

Construction
- Opened: 1808; 218 years ago

Website
- www.teatropiccolo.it

Teatro della Concordia (Concord/Harmony Theatre) is a theatre located in Monte Castello di Vibio, in the Umbria region in Italy. It is the smallest Italian-style theatre in the world.

== Design ==
The architectural plan of Teatro della Concordia is a bell shape, with deep narrow hall opening to a proscenium and stage, which is a typical Italian theater design.

The theatre has only 99 seats, which are distributed in 62 seats in boxes and 37 seats in the stalls. The auditorium has an area of 68 square metres (730 ft^{2}), the stage 50 square metres (540 ft^{2}) and the entrance hall 29 square metres (310 ft^{2}). The theatre has public performances, and is regularly played.

== History ==
19th century

The Teatro della Concordia was built at the beginning of the 19th century, during the epoch of the Napoleonic Wars invasion, by nine prosperous Umbrian families. They wanted to support cultural ideals beyond the French Revolution's goals, including: the spirit of freedom, equality and brotherhood. The new theatre was opened in 1808. The interior of the theatre was later decorated in 1892 with frescos by Luigi Agretti.

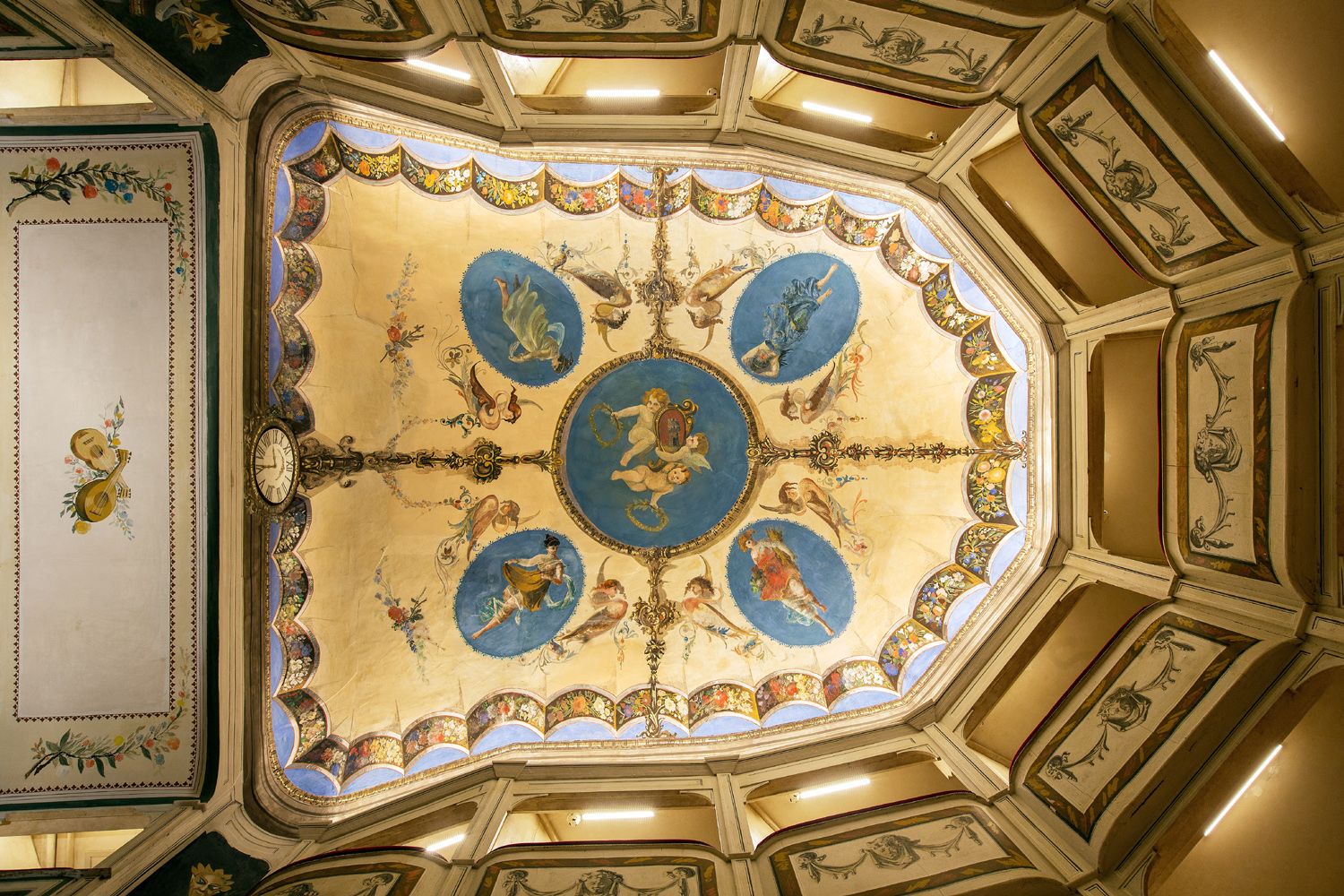
Ceiling fresco by Luigi Agretti.

20th century

Due to a post-war (WW II) deteriorated condition, the building was closed in 1951. Thirty years later, in 1981, the municipality of Monte Castello di Vibio purchased the theatre and restored it under the direction of the architects Paolo Leonelli and Mario Struzzi. The Teatro della Concordia was reopened in 1993. In the same year the association Società del Teatro della Concordia was founded.

In 1997 the Teatro della Concordia started a partnership with the Teatro Farnese of Parma. In 2008 the exhibition area Sala Espositiva Nello Latini was opened in the basement of the Teatro della Concordia on the occasion of its 200 Year Jubilee. Edoardo Brenci, the president of the Società del Teatro della Concordia, organizes every year series of events with stage productions, concerts, expositions and other events.

== Performances ==
Among the known artists who have given performances at the Teatro della Concordia are, inter alia, the Italian actress Gina Lollobrigida, as well as the Austrian musician Johanna Beisteiner.

== Gallery ==
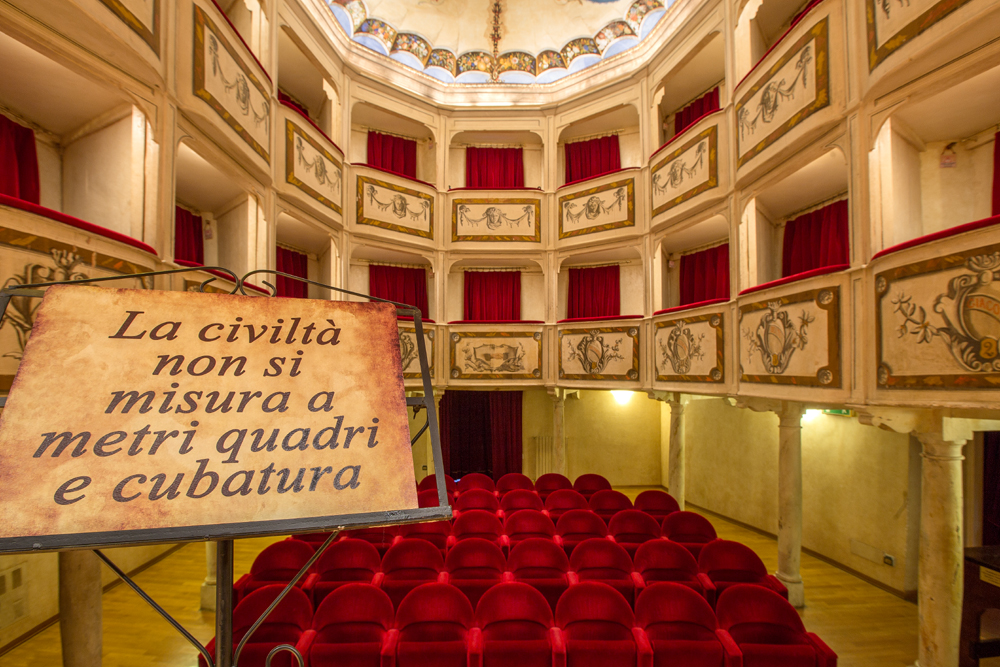
Auditorium and slogan ″Civilization is not measured in square meters and volume.″

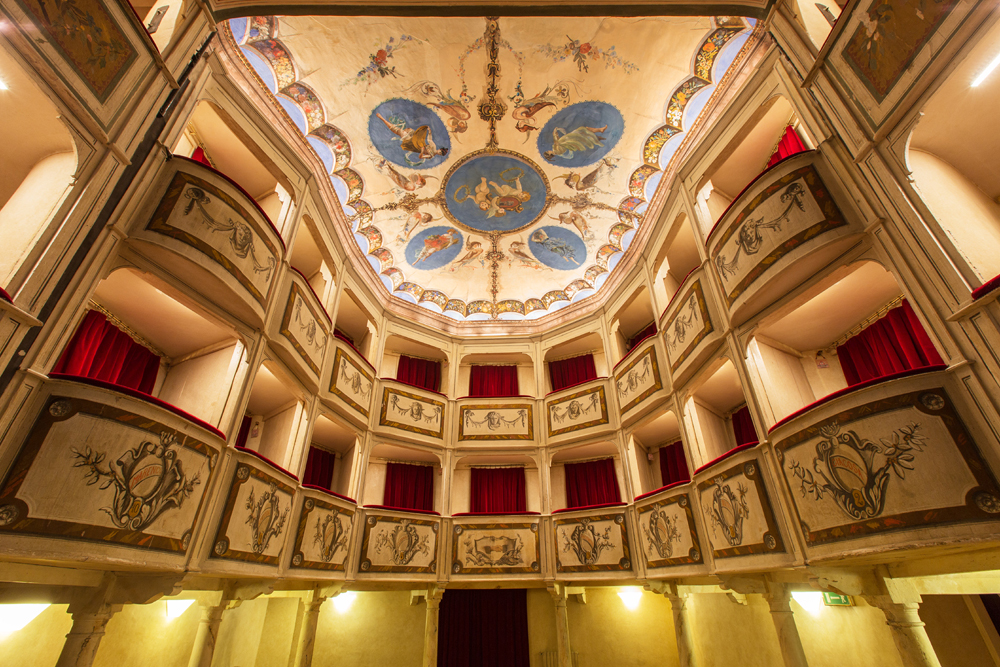
Boxes and parts of the ceiling fresco.

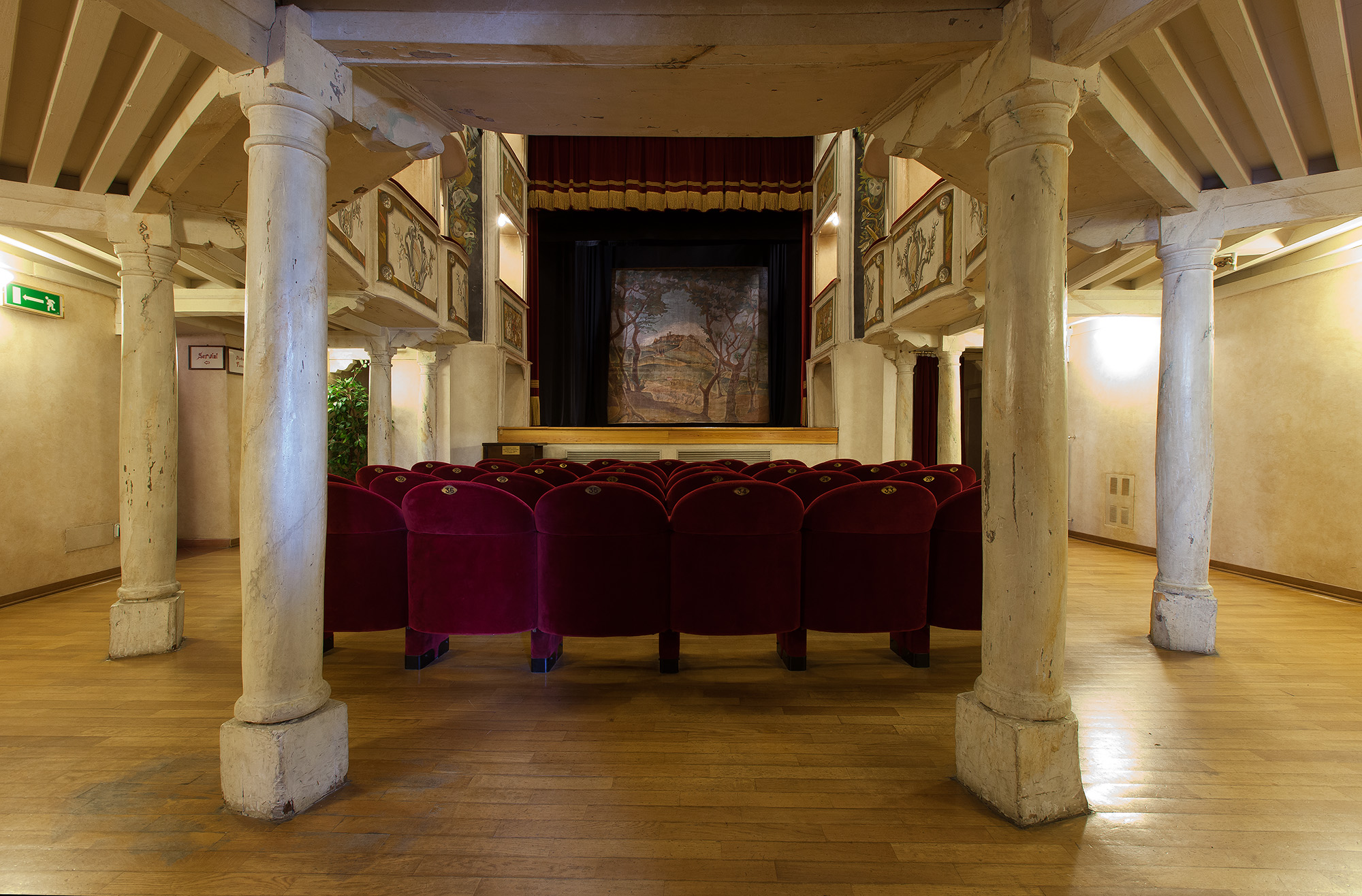
Stall seats and stage.

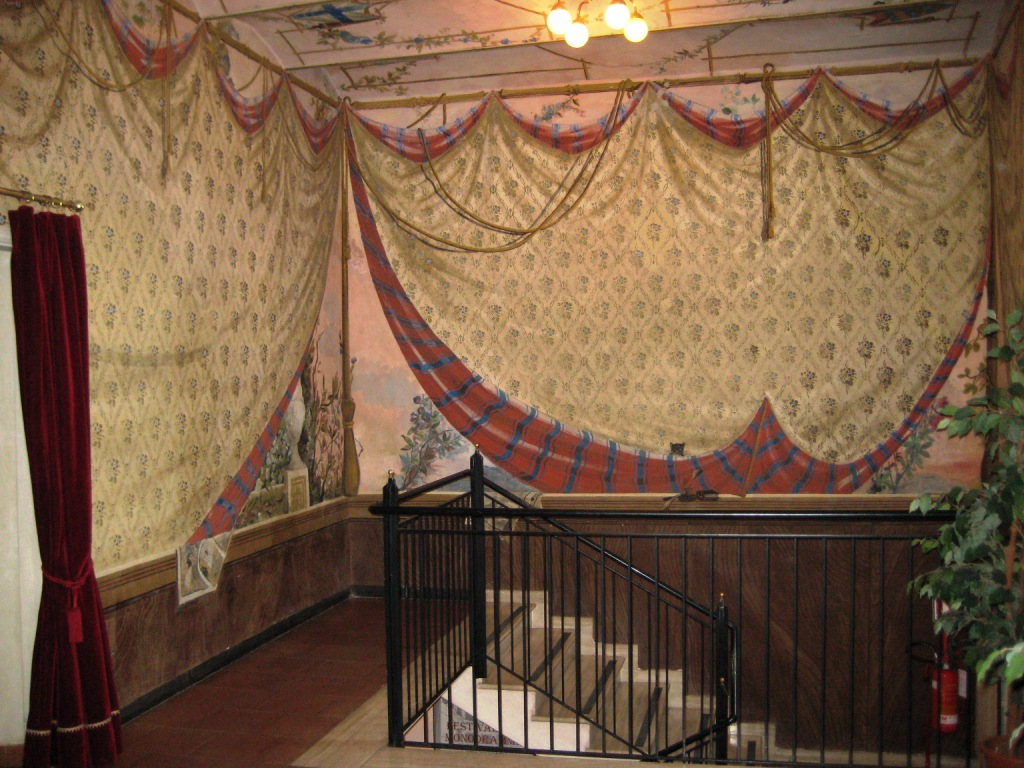
Lobby

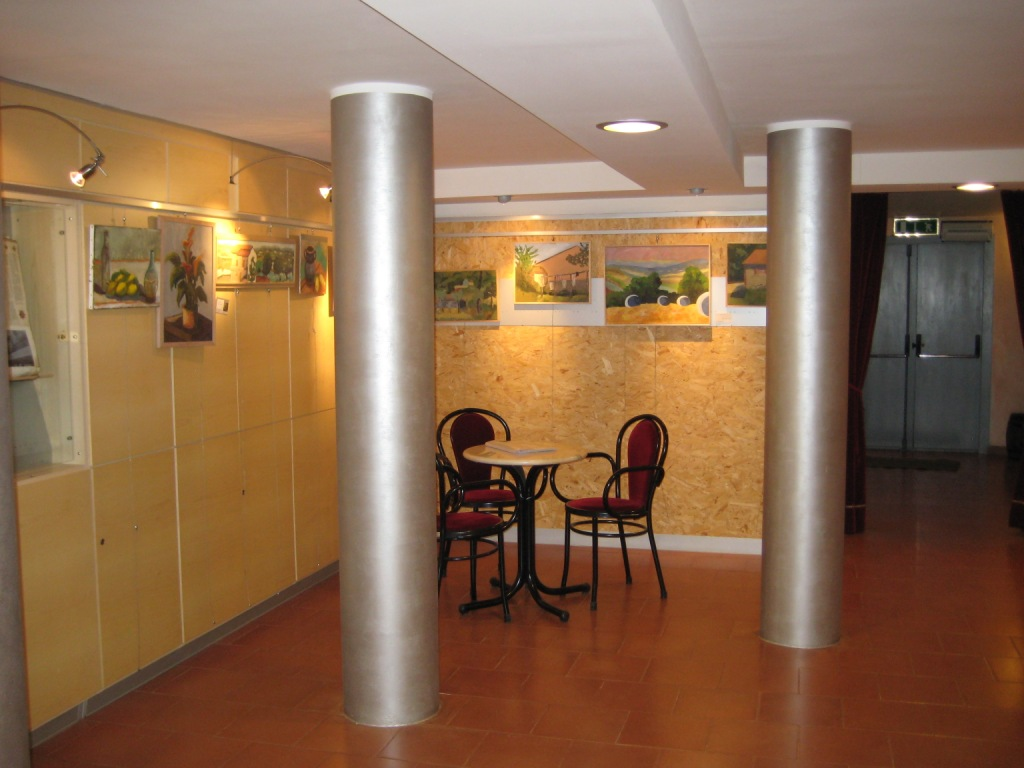
Exhibition hall Nello Latini

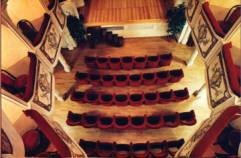
Auditorium in bell shape

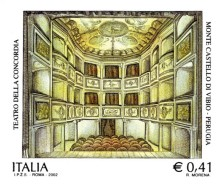
Italian stamp of the year 2002 showing the Teatro della Concordia
