= A Hidden Life (2001 film) =

2001 film

- Theatrical release poster
- Directed by: Suzana Amaral
- Written by: Suzana Amaral
- Based on: Uma Vida em Segredo by Autran Dourado
- Produced by: Assunção Hernandes
- Starring: Sabrina Greve
- Cinematography: Lauro Escorel
- Edited by: Verónica Sáenz
- Music by: Luiz Henrique Xavier
- Production company: Raiz Filmes
- Distributed by: Riofilme
- Release dates: November 2001 (Festival de Brasília); 19 July 2002 (theatrical release)
- Running time: 95 minutes
- Country: Brazil
- Language: Portuguese
- Box office: R$86,160

A Hidden Life (Portuguese: Uma Vida em Segredo) is a 2001 Brazilian drama film directed by Suzana Amaral.

== Cast ==
- Sabrina Greve as Biela
- Eliane Giardini as Constança
- Cacá Carvalho as Conrado
- João Antônio as Dr. Godinho
- Benício Aleixo Bernardo as Truco player
- Neusa Borges as Joviana
- Tânia Botelho as Dona Alice
- Erasmo Xavier da Costa as Truco player 2
- João Luiz Pompeu de Pina as Cavaleiro 2
- Itamar Gonçalves as Gumercindo
- Nayara Guércio as Mazília

== Reception ==
It was entered into the 24th Moscow International Film Festival. At the 34th Festival de Brasília, it won the Best Actress Award (Sabrina Greve) and Best Sound. It received the Best Director, Best Actress (Greve), and Jury's Special awards at the 28th Festival de Cine Iberoamericano de Huelva.
