= Suzana Amaral =

Brazilian film director and screenwriter (1932–2020)

- Born: 28 March 1932; São Paulo, Brazil
- Died: 25 June 2020 (aged 88); São Paulo, Brazil
- Occupations: Film director Screenwriter
- Years active: 1968–2018
- Height: 1.37 m (4 ft 6 in) (approximate)
- Children: 9

Suzana Amaral Rezende (March 28, 1932 – June 25, 2020) was a Brazilian film director and screenwriter. She was best known for the 1985 film A Hora da Estrela (Hour of the Star).

== Career ==
Amaral's film career started at the age of 37 when she entered the University of São Paulo film school. After graduating, she taught at the university for three years and began working for Radio and Television Cultura. In her 14-year career at Radio and Television Cultura she produced approximately 50 documentaries, films, and plays for the station. In 1976 she moved to New York to pursue a degree in film from the Tisch School of the Arts at New York University. She completed this degree and graduated in 1978.

Her documentaries focused primarily on Brazilian society and culture. Notable ones include A Semana de 22 a documentary that covered the start of the Modern art movement in Brazil, and My Life Our Struggle a documentary showcasing Grupo de Maes de Vila Campo Limpo; an organization of impoverished women in Sao Paulo fighting for better living conditions. These documentaries were generally received well, they were applauded for their educational value.

The plot of her film Hotel Atlântico is an allegory for her beliefs and experiences as a practicing Buddhist. In the film, Julio Andrade plays an unnamed character who lets fate dictate his life, they wander without any real direction, without concern for the past or future.

== A Hora da Estrela ==
Amaral's first feature film and best known work, A Hora da Estrela (Hour of the Star) was released in 1985. Based on the novel of the same name by Clarice Lispector, the film focuses on the life of a troubled young protagonist, Macabéa (Marcélia Cartaxo), living in São Paulo. According to film critic Nissa Torrents, "the film upsets many stereotypes in its presentation of the female protagonist, who is neither beautiful nor middle-class. An anti-heroine, starved of affection and respect, she wanders through life looking for an image she can adopt and adapt." The film was well received at its release and was a Submission to the 59th Academy Awards for Best Foreign Language Film. Additionally, it was entered into the 36th Berlin International Film Festival, where actress Marcélia Cartaxo won the Silver Bear for Best Actress. At the 1985 Brasilia Film Festival the film won best picture and Amaral won best director. Additionally, the film also won best picture at the 1986 Havana Film Festival. Amaral was chosen as best director at the 1986 International Woman's Film Festival. A Hora da Estrela was shot in four weeks on a budget of $150,000, 70% of which was funded by Embrafilme. The success of A Hora da Estrela led Amaral to immediate notoriety, though none of her other films have achieved such success.

== Awards ==
Suzana Amaral and her films have received numerous awards and recognition for their artistic and narrative excellence.

Her debut film, Hour of the Star (A Hora da Estrela), was awarded the Silver Bear for Best Actress at the Berlin International Film Festival, the award recognizes the film’s lead actress Marcélia Cartaxo's for her compelling performance.

The film was also Brazil's official submission for the Academy Awards in the Best Foreign Language Film category in 1986.

Amaral's 2001 film, A Hidden Life (Uma Vida em Segredo), won the Best Film Award at the Huelva Film Festival. Based on the novel by Autran Dourado, the film was praised for its sensitive portrayal of rural life and societal change.

Her final feature, Hotel Atlântico (2009), won the Best Film Award at the Lima Latin American Film Festival. Adapted from João Gilberto Noll's novel, the film was lauded by critics and audiences alike for its thought-provoking exploration of human relationships and existential themes.

== Personal life ==
Amaral had nine children, one of which was born while she was pursuing her film studies in São Paulo. She has said that she was "totally dedicated to motherhood for 10 years" before deciding to pursue her dream of filmmaking. She was divorced. Amaral was an avid follower of Bollywood films who said she wanted Indian films to come to Brazil in a big way.

While studying at NYU, Amaral was a big fan of Bollywood films. She often would go to 56th street in midtown Manhattan. Later in her life and professional career she urged Brazilian audiences to watch Bollywood films, hoping it would introduce more Indian culture to the Brazilian masses. Amaral was a Buddhist. Not much is known about her religious practices, it is speculated that she converted to Buddhism later in her life primarily because of Bollywood films. Her children are Christian, Amaral was often known to attend religious events they would host.

Amaral stated in an interview that she wanted to visit India and meet the Dalai Lama. She also expressed interest in participating in the International Film Festival of India

== Filmography ==
Key
†	Indicates a documentary	‡	Indicates a short film

List of films directed by Suzana Amaral
Year	Original title	English release title	Language(s)	Notes
1970	A Semana de 22 ^{†}		Portuguese	Short documentary on the Modern Art Week of 1922.
1971	Sua Majestade Piolin ^{†}		Portuguese	Short documentary on clown Piolin.
1979	Minha vida, nossa luta^{†}	My Life, Our Struggle	Portuguese	Documentary on impoverished women in São Paulo organizing for better conditions
1980	Projeto Pensamentos e Linguagem ^{†}		Portuguese	Series of 15 films, each 15 minutes in length, as part of a training program for elementary school teachers.
1985	A Hora da Estrela	Hour of the Star	Portuguese	
1992	Procura-se		Portuguese	TV mini series. Portuguese production.
2001	Uma Vida em Segredo	A Hidden Life	Portuguese	
2009	Hotel Atlântico		Portuguese	
2018	O Caso Morel		Portuguese	
