= Monte Castello di Vibio =

- Comune
- Comune di Monte Castello di Vibio
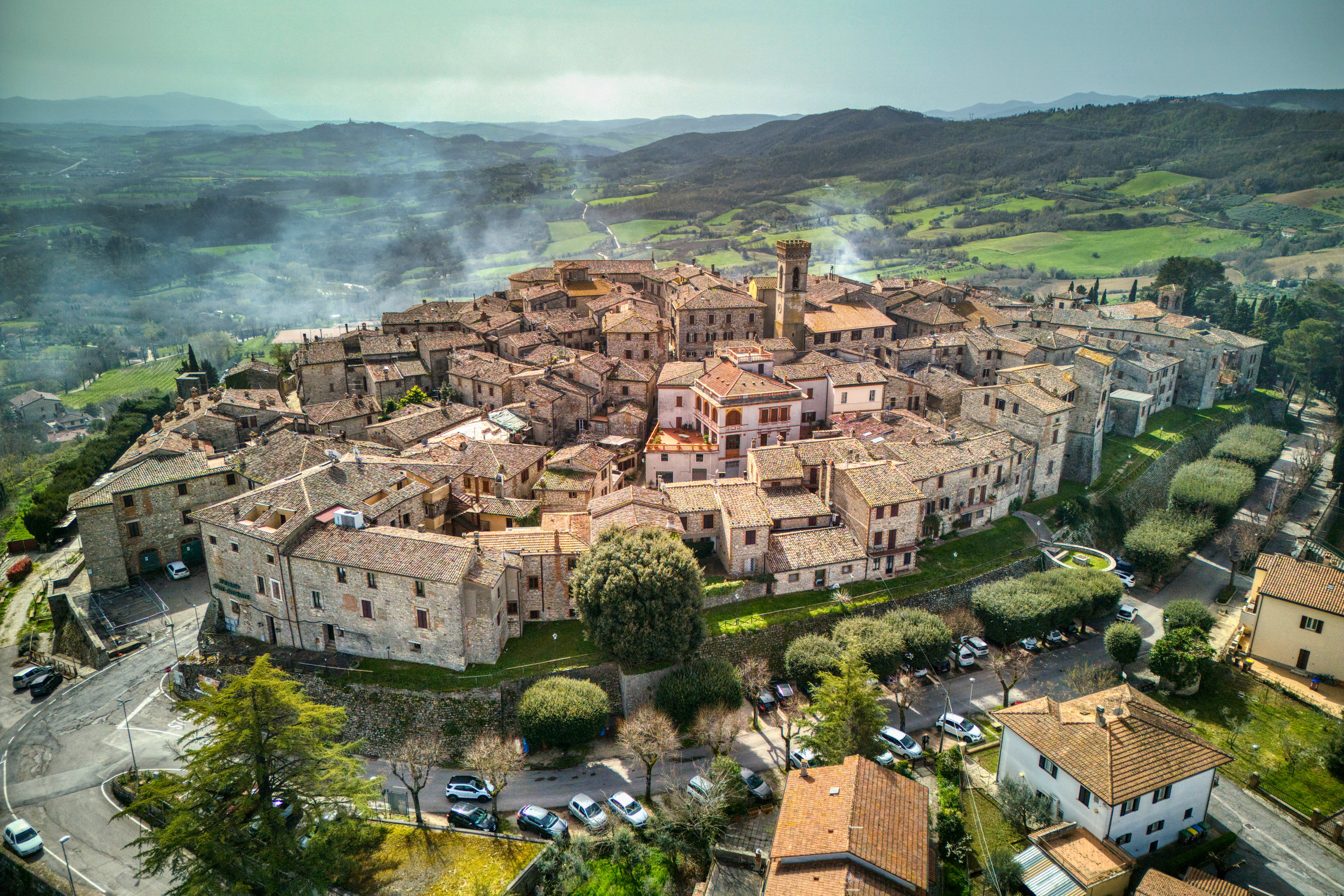
- View of Monte Castello di Vibio

- Coat of arms

- Location within Italy Location within Umbria
- Coordinates: 42.840381°N 12.352314°E
- Country: Italy
- Region: Umbria
- Province: Perugia (PG)

Government
  - Mayor: Daniele Brugnossi

Area
  - Total: 31.95 km^{2} (12.34 sq mi)
- Elevation: 423 m (1,388 ft)

Population (1 January 2025)
  - Total: 1,418
  - Density: 44.38/km^{2} (114.9/sq mi)
- Demonym: Montecastellesi
- Time zone: UTC+1 (CET)
  - Summer (DST): UTC+2 (CEST)
- Postal code: 06057
- Dialing code: 075
- Patron saint: St. Philip and St. James
- Saint day: May 3
- Website: Official website

Monte Castello di Vibio is a comune (municipality) in the Province of Perugia in the Italian region Umbria, located about 30 kilometres (19 mi) south of Perugia. Monte Castello di Vibio borders the following municipalities: Fratta Todina, San Venanzo, Todi.

It is a medieval, 15th century walled village of central Italy and sits in the Umbrian Hillside above the Tiber Valley. It is one of I Borghi più belli d'Italia ("The most beautiful villages of Italy").

The surrounding landscape is quilted with vineyards, olive groves and sunflower fields, and stitched in with rows of cypresses and umbrella pines.

== Etymology ==
Monte Castello (Castle Mountain) refers to the medieval fort structure of that villages that was built in the Umbrian hillside, while Vibio was added to the name in 1863 to distinguish it from other municipalities after the Unification of Italy.

Vibio likely comes from an ancient, noble family of Perugia, Colonia Vibia Augusta Perusia and Roman emperor Gaius Vibius Trebonianus Gallus.

== History ==
Montecastello di Vibio has a poorly documented early history. Some writers held that it originated in 980 through the actions of the Atti family. In the Middle Ages the settlement was considerably larger and more populous than in later times, as indicated by the remains of buildings and by the surrounding circuit of walls.

In 1254 the town suffered notable damage when Guelph cavalry expelled the Ghibelline faction.

In the medieval period Monte Castello formed a community under the municipality of Todi, and its relationship with Todi was marked by continuing conflict. In the late 14th century it was freed from Todi’s control and placed under the Holy See.

In 1392 Pope Boniface IX ordered an enfeoffment to the Atti family. Catalano degli Atti, associated with this grant, was imprisoned by Malatesta IV Malatesta of Rimini after Malatesta became lord of Todi in July 1392. After 1392 Monte Castello was under Ludovico Migliorati, nephew of Pope Innocent VII and lord of Todi, and in 1408 it was held by Ladislaus of Anjou-Durazzo. It later returned to the Atti line under Andrea and Giacomo, sons of Catalano degli Atti.

In 1464 Monte Castello passed to the Church under Pope Paul II. On 10 February 1470, by order of Paul II, it was re-entered in the land registers of Todi. During the pontificate of Pope Sixtus IV della Rovere, the lordship was granted to his nephew Bartolomeo Jacopo. On 29 November 1475 the community was returned to Todi.

A municipal statute was issued on 22 March 1516.

In the 17th century local magistracies were retained, but political authority was in the hands of governors, while the magistracies were limited to administrative functions. The papal governor was often a cardinal and usually did not reside locally.

In the late 18th century, under the administrative order of the Roman Republic, Monte Castello was placed in the Trasimeno Department. After the occupation of the Papal States, in 1809 the French Empire's administrative system created a local mairie. After 1814 the territory was placed within the Delegation of Perugia.

In 1860 it entered the Kingdom of Italy. On 29 March 1863, by Royal Decree no. 1260, the municipality adopted the name Monte Castello di Vibio.

In 1895 Montecastello di Vibio had 1,986 inhabitants.

== Geography ==
Monte Castello occupies a hilltop position that affords a very wide horizon. The locality lies about 6 miles (9.7 km) from Todi. The river Tiber flows to the east of the town's hill. Because of its position, the climate is rather mild. Northern winds prevail.

=== Subdivisions ===
The municipality includes the localities of Doglio, Madonna del Piano, Molino Ciani, Monte Castello di Vibio, Spineta.

In 2021, 681 people lived in rural dispersed dwellings not assigned to any named locality. At the time, the most populous localities were Monte Castello di Vibio proper (495), and Madonna del Piano (197).

== Economy ==
In the 19th century, the surrounding countryside was cultivated with vineyards, olive trees, and mulberries. Pig breeding prospered in the area.

=== Olive oil ===
One of the most popular products of Monte Castello di Vibio is considered olive oil. In fact, this land is inserted in "extra virgin olive oil DOP Umbria" and the head office is in Trevi. The most part of Montecastello's hills, from century traditions, are cultivated with care and passion with olive trees. This tree produces a quality olive oil and is a pleasure feature of landscape.

== Religion ==
=== Santi Filippo e Giacomo ===
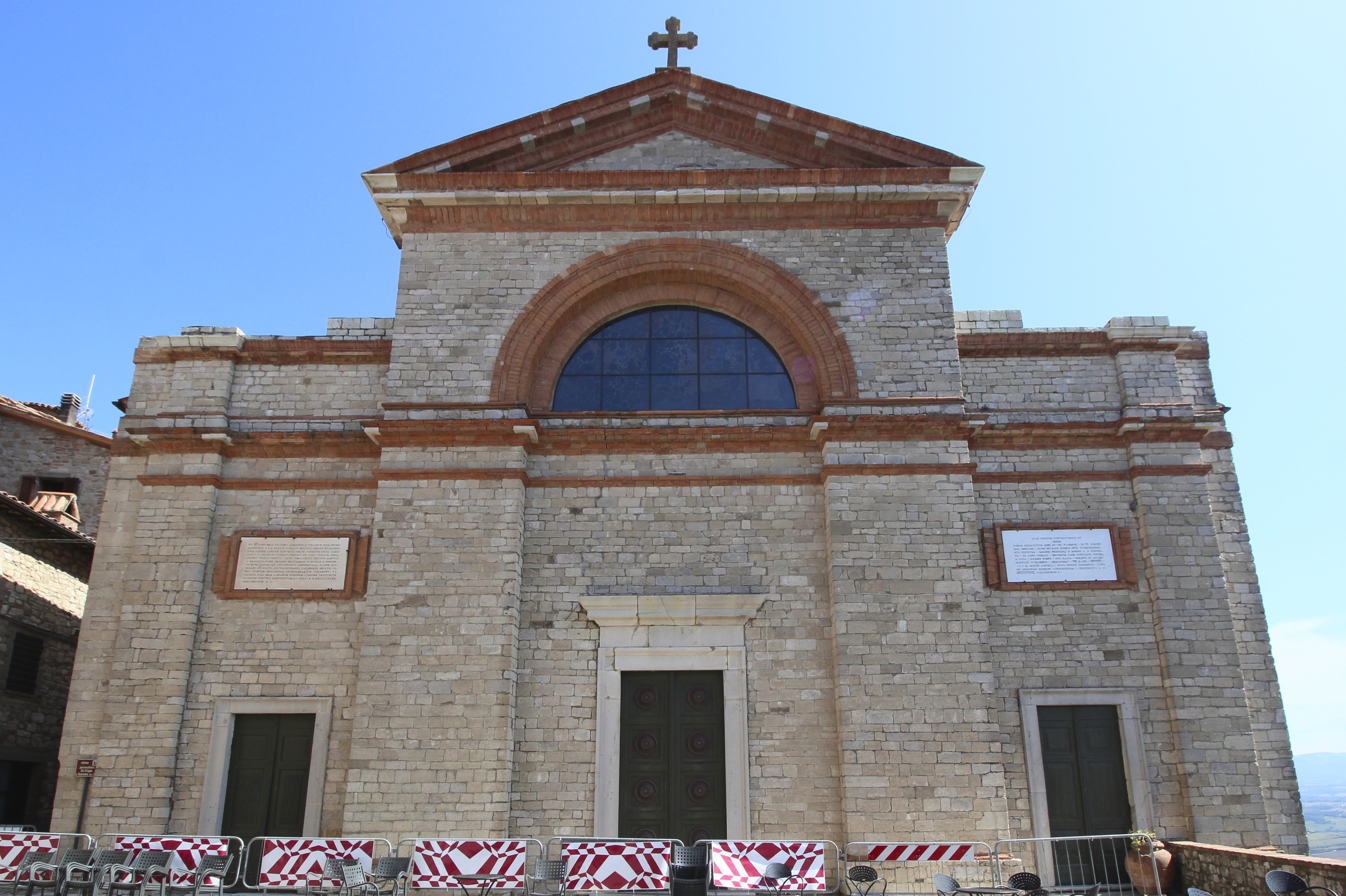
Church of Santi Filippo e Giacomo

The church of Santi Filippo e Giacomo stands on the main square of Monte Castello. It was built in 1851 on the site of an earlier, smaller church. The building is Neoclassical, with a simple façade opened by a semicircular window that was later completed with colored glass.

The interior has a rectangular plan divided into three naves ending in three semicircular apses. At the center of the presbytery is the high altar, flanked by statues of Saint Philip and Saint James and surmounted by the image of the Madonna dei Portenti. The church also contains a baptismal font and an olea sacra with carved motifs and figures, and a so-called Braccio Santo in silver, on which a ring and a bracelet are mounted as relics of Saints Philip and James.

The interior of the church is painted by artists Nicola Benvenuti and Mario Barveris.

=== Santa Illuminata ===
Also known as "The Crucifix" because of the 15th century wooden statue that resides in it. Constructed on a small, pre-existing church in 1839 by the Holy See. The vault was frescoed by Luigi Agretti, who decorated the Teatro Della Concordia in 1892.

=== Madonna delle Carceri ===
Ancient stone church with fresco decorated interior, erected in 1505 under the name of Madonna delle Grazie.

== Culture ==
=== Teatro della Concordia ===
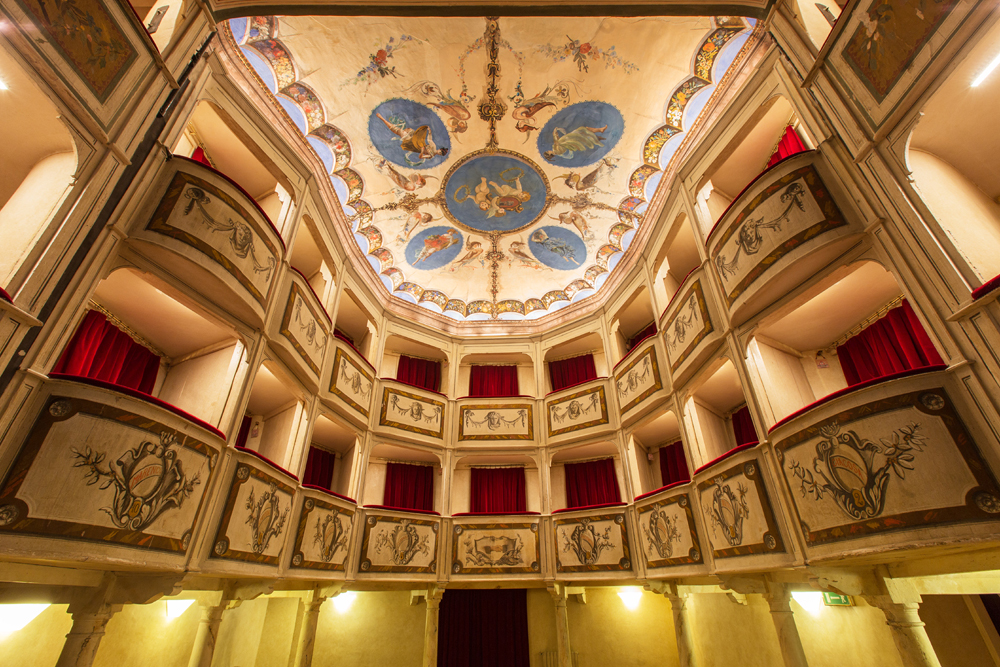
Teatro Della Concordia

The Teatro della Concordia was designed in the context following the French Revolution of 1789 and later dedicated to the "concord among peoples" that was being renewed in Europe at the beginning of the 19th century. It has 99 seats distributed between boxes and the stalls. The theater is the smallest theatre all'italiana in the world and was designed in the shape of a bell.

The theater was built with the finances of nine notable local families and was intended as a place for entertainment and meetings; it also included a café-salon. It was inaugurated in 1808. In 1892 the fourteen-year-old Luigi Agretti, staying in Monte Castello on vacation from La Spezia, frescoed the rooms; his father Cesare, from Perugia, had already produced the decorations for the theater curtain and stage backdrops. In 1914 thirty-six small armchairs were installed in the stalls, later becoming thirty-seven.

The theater closed in 1951, and in the 1960s a collapse affected the roof. Residents of Monte Castello financed initial recovery work through self-taxation, and restoration continued with regional funding and European Community funds. The restoration, which preserved the original wooden structure supporting the boxes, was completed in 1993.

In 1929 the young soprano Antonietta Stella of Todi performed on its stage. In 1945 Gina Lollobrigida appeared there in Santarellina by Scarpetta.

=== Porta Tramontana and Torre di Porta Maggio ===
A medieval towers and the two main gates of the wall surrounding the village. Part of the Historical Museum, includes artifacts and heirlooms such as weapons, friezes, noble coats of arms, cadastral maps and other archeological finds from the Roman period. The restored interior and staircase allow access to panoramic views of the Mid-Tiber valley.

=== Piazza Vittorio Emanuele ===
Scenic vantage point that gives panoramic views of southern Umbria, as well as the Lazio and Abruzzo mountains.

=== Hiking Trails ===
Situated above the Tiver Valley, Monte Castello di Vibio has access to the Sistema Territoriale di Interesse Naturalistico Ambientale (S.T.I.N.A.), which includes three protected natural areas in the mountain community of Monte Peglia and Selva di Meana, as well as the Middle Tiber Valley River Park.

=== International Center for the Arts ===
Monte Castello di Vibio is home to the International Center for the Arts. Founded in 1994, the institution hosts artists, researchers, musicians and academics during the summer and fall months each year. Programming includes retreats, workshops, sommelier courses, festivals, performances and other cultural programming to visitors. They have welcomed some of the most respected artists and thinkers in the world, including William Bailey, Andrew Forge, Ruth Miller, Sandro Chia, John Spike and Wayne Thiebaud.

== Notable people ==
Among the principal families in the 19th century were the Pettinelli, Rossi, and the Fabrizi.
