= Hour of the Star =

1985 film directed by Suzana Amaral

- Film poster
- Directed by: Suzana Amaral
- Written by: Suzana Amaral; Alfredo Oroz
- Based on: The Hour of the Star by Clarice Lispector
- Produced by: Assunção Hernandes
- Starring: Marcélia Cartaxo
- Cinematography: Edgar Moura
- Edited by: Idê Lacreta
- Release dates: February 1986 (Berlinale); April 25, 1986 (Brazil)
- Running time: 96 minutes
- Country: Brazil
- Language: Portuguese

Hour of the Star (Portuguese: A Hora da Estrela) is a Brazilian film directed by Suzana Amaral and released in 1985. The film is an adaptation of Clarice Lispector novel of the same name. It follows Macabea (Marcélia Cartaxo), an impoverished orphan teenager girl living in São Paulo.

The film had its international premiere at the main competition of the 36th Berlin International Film Festival, where Marcélia Cartaxo won the Silver Bear for Best Actress. It was selected as the Brazilian entry for the Best Foreign Language Film at the 59th Academy Awards, but was not nominated.

== Plot ==
Macabea is an impoverished 19 year old orphan girl who recently moved to São Paulo after her aunt, who raised her, died. She works as a typist and shares a room with three other women. Though she works for less than minimum wage, she seems unaware of her impoverishment. She is described as unattractive by coworkers and makes many mistakes at work since she slowly types one key at a time. She seems unaware of the right way to behave in society. Instead of visiting the bathroom at night, she urinates into a bowl she hides under her bed. Instead of using a tissue, she wipes her nose on her sleeve. Her typed pages often have holes and grease on them but she is unaware of this until her boss points it out. However, she is extremely polite and quick to apologize when she makes a mistake. Macabea grew up in extreme poverty without education, and was never taught anything about social graces.

Macabea's personality is a blank slate. She describes herself as a typist and a virgin who likes Coca-Cola. "I'm not much of a person," she says. She spends her time listening to the radio and copying other women. Her lack of experience allows her to derive pleasure from little things in life. On Sundays, she gets great pleasure from riding the subway. When she hears a song on the radio, its beauty moves her to tears. She pastes magazine photos on the walls and listens to others for cues on how to behave. It's unclear what Macabea really wants other than to be like everyone else. She obtains what little knowledge she has from the radio.

Eventually she meets Olimpico, an insecure steelworker from Paraiba with a massive chip on his shoulder who dreams of being rich one day. He is also uncultured and uneducated but behaves as though he knows everything. Olimpico's dream is to be a congressman because they have cars, indoor plumbing, and money to give away. He proudly shows Macabea his gold tooth and says that one day he will have a mouth of gold teeth which will show the world his wealth.

They begin dating which mainly consists of their sitting on a park bench while Olimpico brags about his bright future. He often gets annoyed with Macabea because her naivete prevents her from being impressed with the things he tells her. He is extremely defensive about his lack of education and quick to anger when Macabea questions him telling her that whorehouses are full of girls who asked too much. He seems to be considering her as a wife because of her innocence. Macabea spends most of her time with Olimpico repeating things she's heard on the radio.

Olimpico is often rude to Macabea but she seems not to realize it. When they are caught in a rainstorm, he uses his handkerchief to dry off while she's left shivering. Their first date Olimpico offers to buy her a cup of coffee but tells her that if she wants milk in it, she must pay for it. When she tries to sing a song she likes, he knocks her onto the ground. Macabea gives him a coin and begs him to call her at work so she can get a call just once. He never does.

Macabea's coworker Gloria often gives her advice about men. Gloria dates a different man every week and dresses in sexy clothes. Macabea views her as a big sister or role model. Gloria is so desperate to get married she goes to a macumbeira. The manipulative woman advises her to steal a friend's man as penance for her unclean soul and then she'll meet her dream man. Gloria winds up having an affair with Olimpico. He eventually leaves Macabea telling her she's a hair in his soup that's disgusting.

Gloria winds up meeting the man of her dreams and leaving Olimpico. He waits outside Macabea's house with a giant stuffed animal meant for Gloria. When Macabea goes to the fortune teller, Madame Carlota accurately predicts Macabea's past. Eventually, she tells her she will marry a rich foreigner in a Mercedes who will give her much money. Excited and looking forward to the future for the first time, Macabea buys a new dress and runs out into the street without looking. She is hit by a foreigner in a Mercedes. As she lies bleeding on the street, she imagines the driver running toward her with open arms.

== Cast ==
- Marcélia Cartaxo as Macabéa
- José Dumont as Olímpico de Jesus
- Tamara Taxman as Glória
- Fernanda Montenegro as Madame Carlota
- Umberto Magnani as Seu Raimundo

== Reception ==
=== Critical response ===
Hour of the Star has an approval rating of 80% on review aggregator website Rotten Tomatoes, based on 5 reviews, and an average rating of 7.8/10.

The film is reviewed in Pauline Kael's ninth collection of movie reviews, Hooked, where she praises it, and particularly the performance of Marcelia Cartaxo. The film gets to you, " and the image of Marcelia Cartaxo's Macabea is what does it - the terrible aloneness of this mass woman, this nothing of a woman whom you wouldn't notice on the street. Umberto D stood for all the proud, angry old people who couldn't live on their pensions, but he was himself too - his own ornery old man. Macabea is most herself in her moments of contentment: she smiles serenely as she celebrates her Sunday by taking a ride in the subway. It's the director's triumph that this girl gets away from her. Numbed as she is, she's as alive as Amaral or you or I, and more mysteriously so."

== See also ==
- List of submissions to the 59th Academy Awards for Best Foreign Language Film
- List of Brazilian submissions for the Academy Award for Best Foreign Language Film
