= Heidenlöcher =

1986 film

- Directed by: Wolfram Paulus
- Written by: Wolfram Paulus
- Produced by: Peter Voiss; Axel von Hahn
- Starring: Florian Pircher
- Cinematography: Wolfgang Simon
- Edited by: Wolfgang Simon
- Release date: 1986
- Running time: 100 minutes
- Countries: Austria; West Germany
- Language: German

Heidenlöcher is a 1986 Austrian drama film directed by Wolfram Paulus. It was entered into the 36th Berlin International Film Festival.

== Cast ==
- Florian Pircher as Santner
- Albert Paulus as Ruap
- Helmut Vogel as Jacek
- Matthias Aichhorn as Dürlinger
- Rolf Zacher as Aufseher
- Claus-Dieter Reents as Gestapomann
- Maria Aichhorn as Frau Dürlinger
- Gerta Rettenwender as Frau Santner
- Joanna Madej as Agnes
- Franz Hafner as Forstmeister
- Doris Kreer as Lisabeth
- Hubsi Aichhorn as Festl
- Darius Polanski as Staschek
- Piotr Firackiewicz as Kowal
