= Wolfram Paulus =

Austrian film director (1957–2020)

- Born: 12 August 1957; Grossarl, Austria
- Died: 28 May 2020 (aged 62); Salzburg, Austria
- Occupations: Film director Screenwriter
- Years active: 1981-2020

Wolfram Paulus (12 August 1957 – 28 May 2020) was an Austrian film director and screenwriter. His 1986 film Heidenlöcher was entered into the 36th Berlin International Film Festival.

== Life and career ==
Paulus studied at the University of Television and Film Munich from 1977 to 1982. After completing his civilian service with Lebenshilfe in Salzburg, he made his first feature film, Heidenlöcher. The film was selected as the Austrian entry for the competition programme of the Berlin International Film Festival in 1986.

Paulus preferred to work with nonprofessional actors. His early films are regarded as pioneering works of the New Austrian Film movement and are characterized by their close examination of subjects such as homeland, religion, tourism, and childhood. In films such as Heidenlöcher, he also portrayed the oppressive atmosphere of life during World War II in a stark manner. An empathetic approach to the protagonists of his stories was reinforced through sophisticated sound design and editing. Paulus wrote the screenplays for his films and edited them himself. Bert Breit and Peter Valentin frequently composed the film scores.

Paulus's first three feature films, Heidenlöcher, Nachsaison, and Die Ministranten, are included in the Edition österreichischer Film series, as is his short film Wochenend, which was released on DVD No. 24.

A retrospective of Paulus's work scheduled for March 2020 at the Filmarchiv Austria's Metro-Kino in Vienna was cancelled because of the COVID-19 pandemic and was instead presented through the Filmarchiv's online channel. The retrospective was held in September and October 2020 and was expanded to include a memorial event for Paulus, who had died in the meantime.

Paulus died of cancer in Salzburg in May 2020, at the age of 62.

== Selected filmography ==
- Heidenlöcher (1986)
- Our Big Time (2012)
