= Luigi Agretti =

Italian painter (1877–1937)

Luigi Agretti (16 August 1877 – 17 November 1937) was an Italian painter and decorator.

He used a formal repertoire of late Neoclassical origin. Throughout his career, he alternated between easel paintings, frescoes, and ornamental decorations. His works, whether in oil or fresco, are characterised by attention to detail, with precision in drawing. He worked on sacred, profane, historical and mythological subjects.

== Biography ==
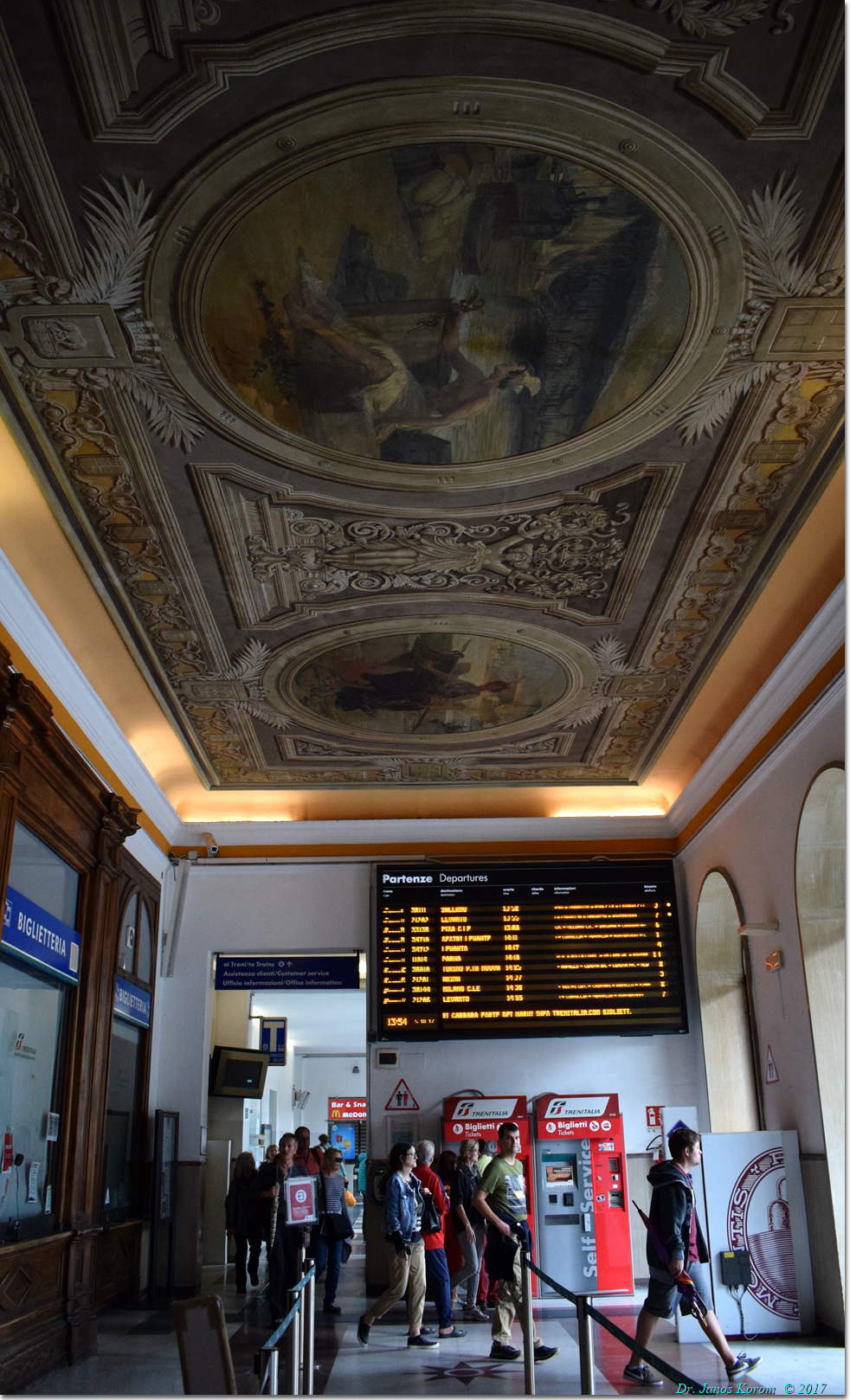
Frescoes in the atrium of the La Spezia Stazione Centrale

Luigi Agretti was born in La Spezia. He started learning art from his father, Cesare Agretti, a painter and decorator who settled in La Spezia from his native Perugia. At the age of fifteen, in 1891, he traveled to Monte Castello di Vibio, in the province of Perugia, where he already received his first solo project: the decoration of the Teatro della Concordia (restored in 1993 and still active today), which is considered the world's smallest theater, with ninety-nine seats.

In 1895, in Genoa, he won a scholarship for young artists and was able to go to Rome, where he attended the Academy of Fine Arts and simultaneously worked for his mentors Domenico Bruschi and Annibale Brugnoli, assisting them in many projects in Rome, Florence (Palazzo Cesaroni), Perugia, Cagliari, and Palestrina (Duomo). Due to the numerous works he created in Perugia, the Perugia Academy of Fine Arts appointed him as an "Academic of Merit" in 1903 and offered him a chair for teaching nude and pictorial anatomy. However, he declined the position to remain in his city.

Upon returning to Liguria, he painted frescoes in the parish churches of Neirone, San Pellegrino di Sturla, Favale di Malvaro, and the Church of Santa Maria degli Angeli in Arcola.

He created three fresco medallions in the atrium of the ticket office of the train station in his city as well as canvases, including Le nozze di Psiche, Mater Amabilis (exhibited in Florence in 1900), an Allegoria della guerra, Tricolore (preserved in the Pinacoteca Comunale of La Spezia), and several landscapes, kept in the Pinacoteca in Imola.

In 1934, he participated in the Fascista Belle Arti di La Spezia, the First Provincial Exhibition, with works such asSulla Magra and Pesca agli Stagnoni.

A few years later, he died at the age of sixty in his city, which honored him by naming a street after him.

== Works ==
=== Frescoes ===
- Churches: Neirone (Province of Genoa), Favale di Malvaro (Province of Genoa), San Pellegrino Genova Sturla; Cathedral of Santa Maria Assunta La Spezia, Tremossi di Borzonasca (Province of Genoa), Caregli, Church of Santa Maria Maddalena Castelnuovo Magra (Province of La Spezia), Annunziata Ceparana di Bolano (Province of La Spezia), San Francesco Lerici (Province of La Spezia) (decorations on the parish vault), Santa Illuminata Monte Castello di Vibio (Province of Perugia).
- Sanctuaries: Madonna degli Angeli di Arcola (Province of La Spezia), San Nicolò Arcola (Province of La Spezia).
- Atrium of the La Spezia Stazione Centrale.
- Crozza Palace

=== Canvases ===
- Mater Amabilis (ritratto della madre)
- Le quattro stagioni
- Le nozze di Cana
- Caterina de' Medici giunge a La Spezia
- la Madonna in Egitto.

=== Other ===
- Le nozze di Psiche on the ceiling of the hall and various decorative panels in the Villa Marmori-Ceretti in La Spezia,
- The frieze of Sala dei Matrimoni (former Palazzo Cenere – ex Town Hall of La Spezia).
- The frieze of the former Cozzani Theatre in La Spezia.
- Decorative panels of a theatre in San Francisco, California.
- Decorations of the Fabbricotti Castle in Bocca di Magra.
- Project for the Church of San Francesco in Ravenna: Trasporto della Salma di Dante, Visione del Paradiso, Trionfo della Religione.

== Gallery ==
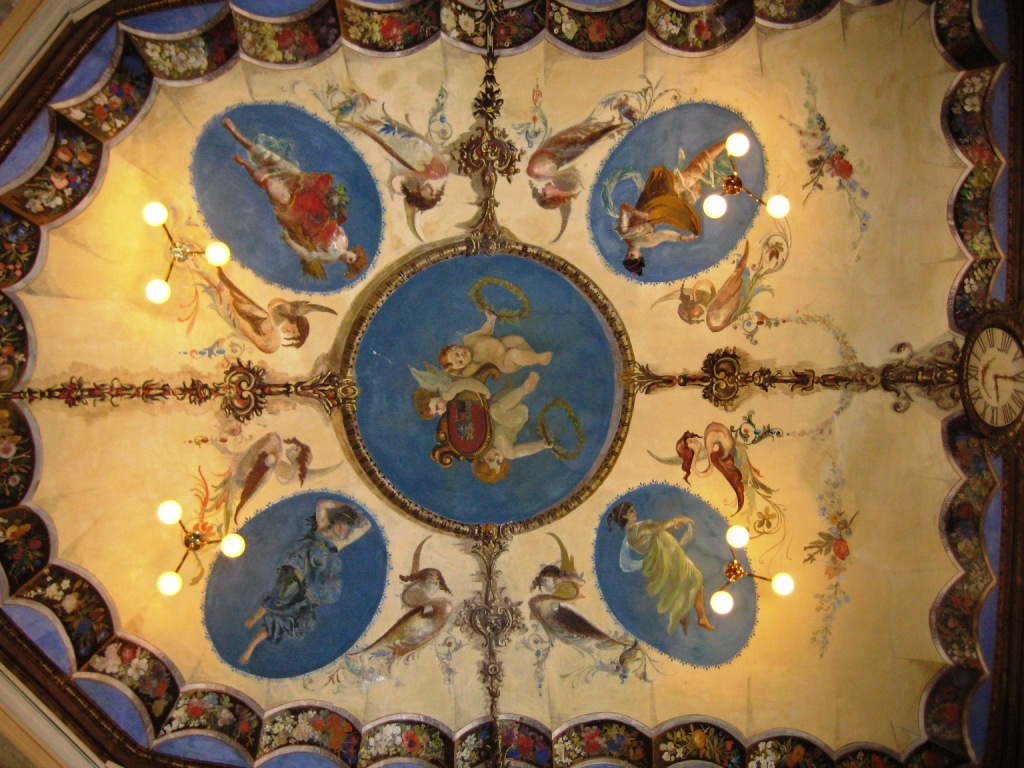
Fresco in the Teatro della Concordia, Monte Castello di Vibio, 1892

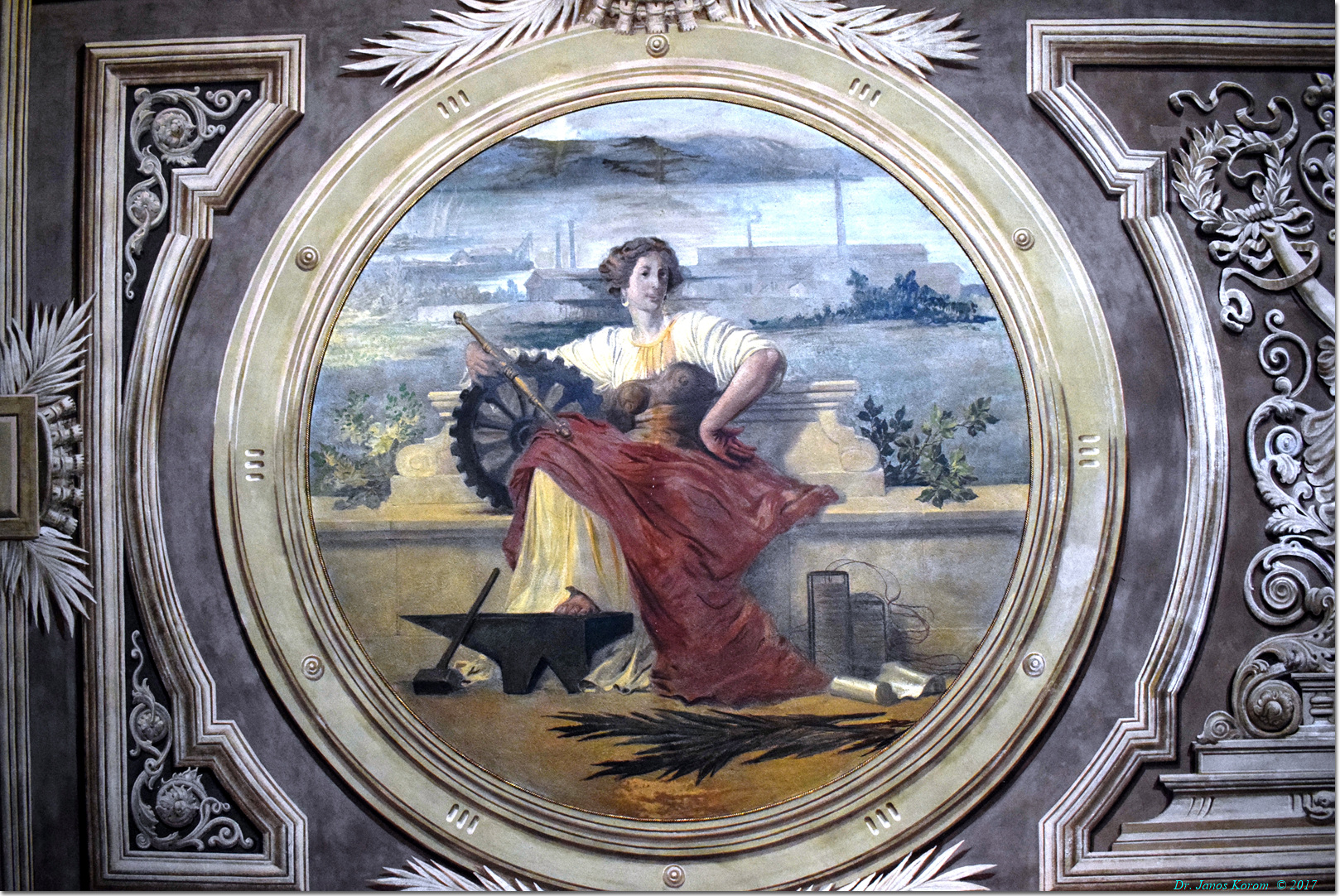
Industria, fresco in the atrium of the La Spezia Stazione Centrale 1897

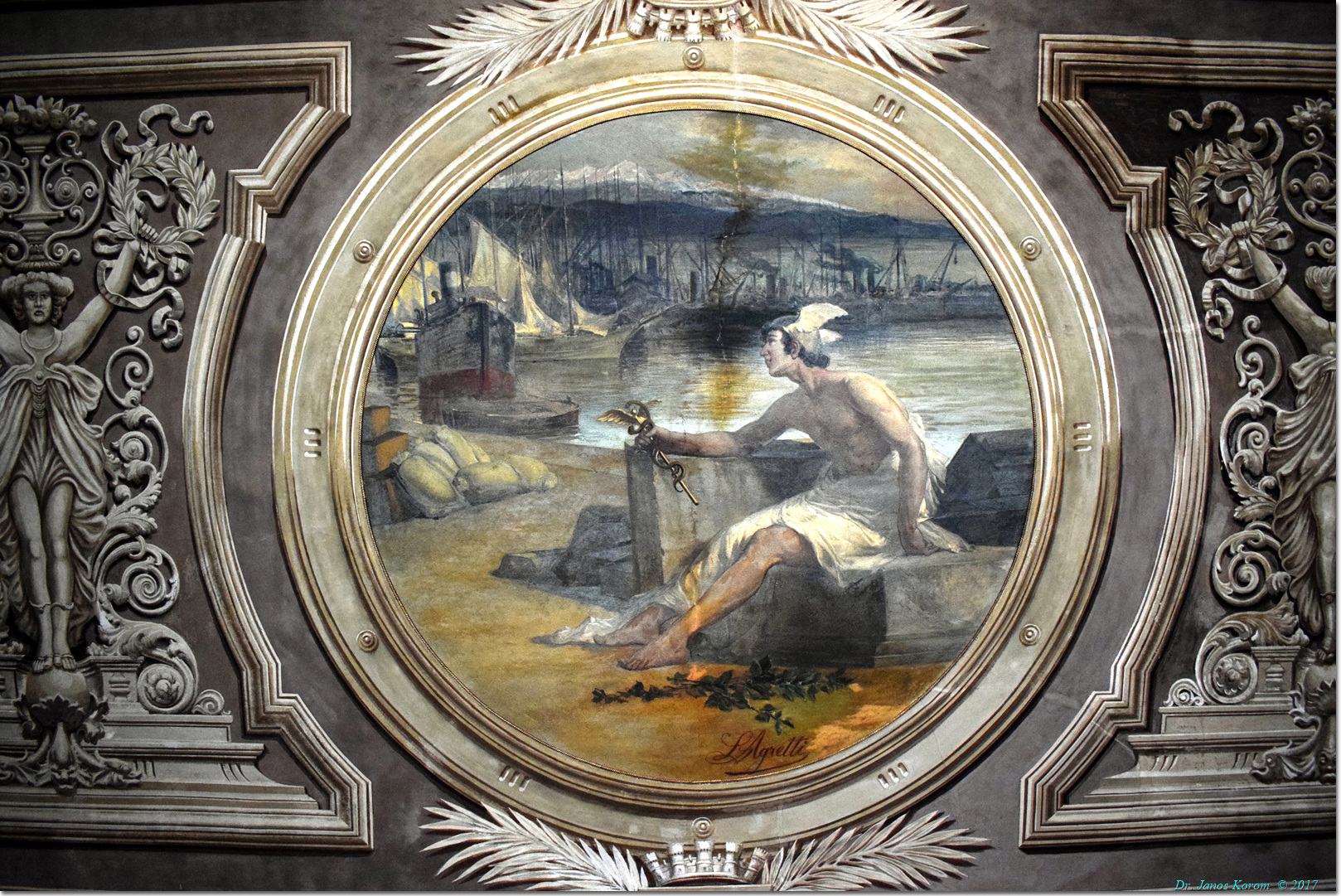
Commercio, fresco in the atrium of the La Spezia Stazione Centrale 1897

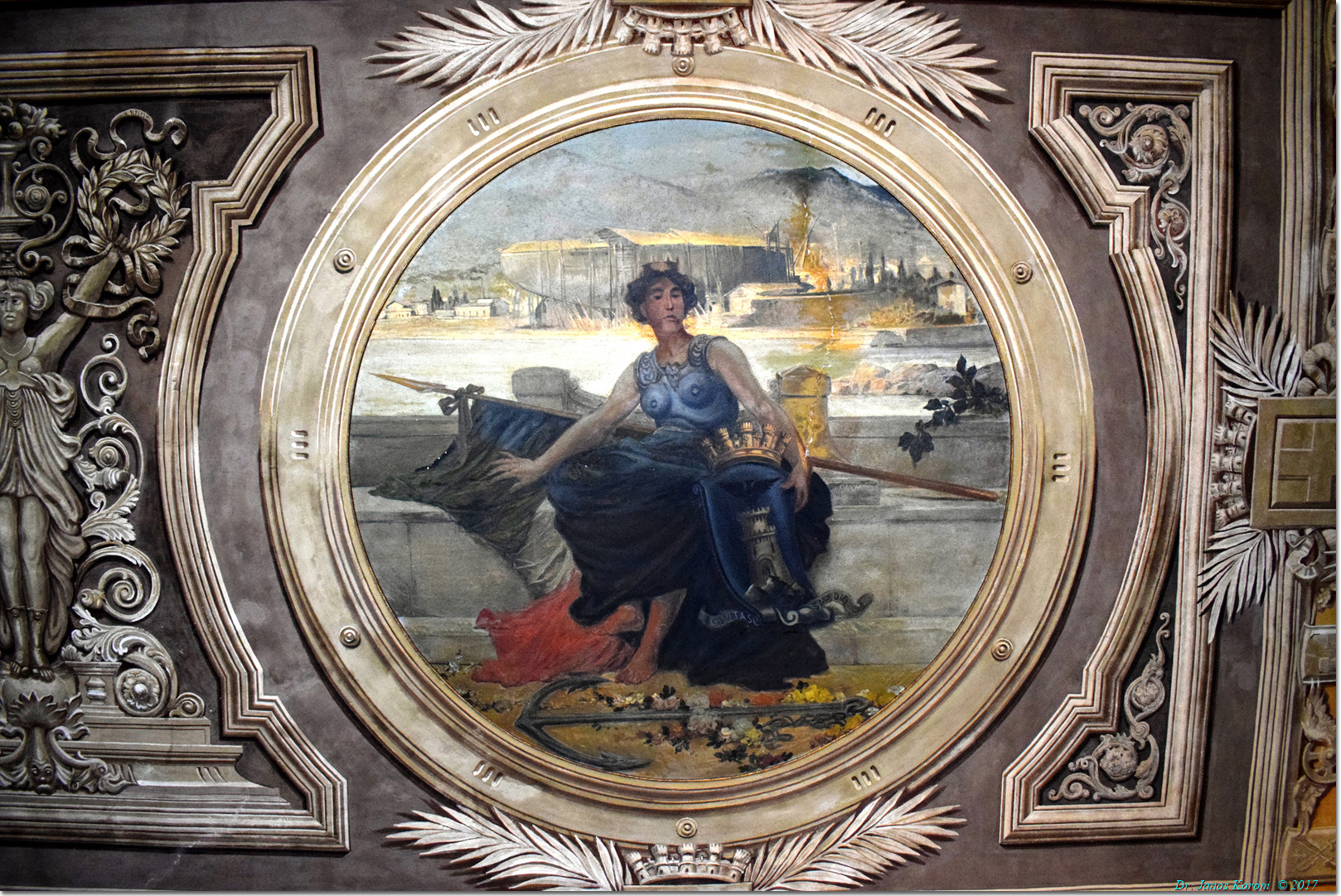
La Spezia, fresco in the atrium of the La Spezia Stazione Centrale 1897

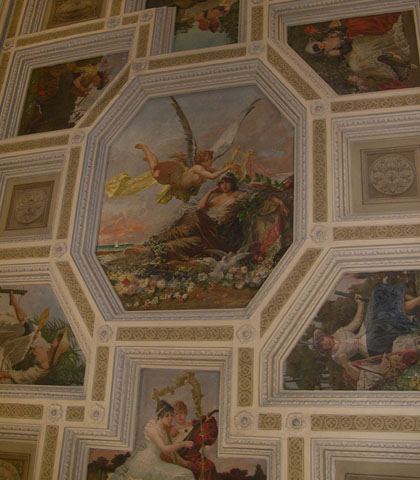
Frescoes in the ballroom of Palazzo Crozza, La Spezia 1900

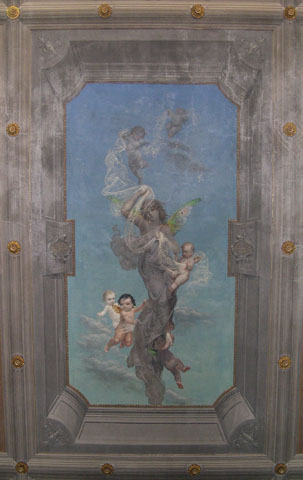
Fresco in the vault of the staircase of Palazzo Crozza, La Spezia
