= The History of Eternity =

2014 film directed by Camilo Cavalcante

- Theatrical release poster
- Portuguese: A História Da Eternidade
- Directed by: Camilo Cavalcante
- Written by: Beto Martins
- Produced by: Marcello Maia
- Starring: Marcélia Cartaxo; Irandhir Santos
- Release date: January 2014 (IFFR)
- Running time: 2h 1min
- Country: Brazil
- Language: Portuguese

The History of Eternity (Portuguese: A História Da Eternidade) is a 2014 Brazilian romantic drama film directed by Camilo Cavalcante and written by Beto Martins.

== Cast ==
- Marcélia Cartaxo - Querência
- Irandhir Santos - João
- Zezita de Matos - Dona Das Dores
