= Karin's Face =

- Directed by: Ingmar Bergman
- Written by: Ingmar Bergman
- Starring: Karin Bergman
- Release date: 29 September 1986
- Running time: 14 minutes
- Language: Swedish

Karin's Face (Swedish title: Karins ansikte) is a 14-minute film directed by Ingmar Bergman and focusing on Bergman's mother, Karin.

== Content ==
The film consists of still photos of Bergman's mother and other family members shown over a simple piano score by Bergman's former wife, Käbi Laretei, with no narration.

== Production ==
It was photographed by Bergman's longtime collaborator and neighbour, Arne Carlsson. It was completed in 1983 but first publicly shown on Swedish Television on 29 September 1986.
