= Stammheim (film) =

1986 film by Reinhard Hauff

Stammheim - Die Baader-Meinhof-Gruppe vor Gericht
- Directed by: Reinhard Hauff
- Written by: Stefan Aust
- Starring: Ulrich Pleitgen; Ulrich Tukur; Therese Affolter
- Music by: Marcel Wengler
- Distributed by: Futura
- Release date: 30 January 1986
- Running time: 107 minutes
- Country: West Germany
- Language: German
- Box office: 409,041 admissions (Germany)

Stammheim – Die Baader-Meinhof-Gruppe vor Gericht (Stammheim – The Baader-Meinhof Gang on Trial) is a 1986 West German film directed by Reinhard Hauff. It tells the story of the trial in the court of Stammheim Prison of the left-wing Baader-Meinhof Group.

== Selected cast ==
- Ulrich Pleitgen as Presiding Judge
- Ulrich Tukur as Andreas Baader
- Therese Affolter as Ulrike Meinhof
- Sabine Wegner as Gudrun Ensslin
- Hans Kremer as Jan-Carl Raspe

== Awards ==
The film won the FIPRESCI Prize and the Golden Bear at the 36th Berlin International Film Festival in 1986.
