= Marcélia Cartaxo =

Brazilian actress (born 1963)

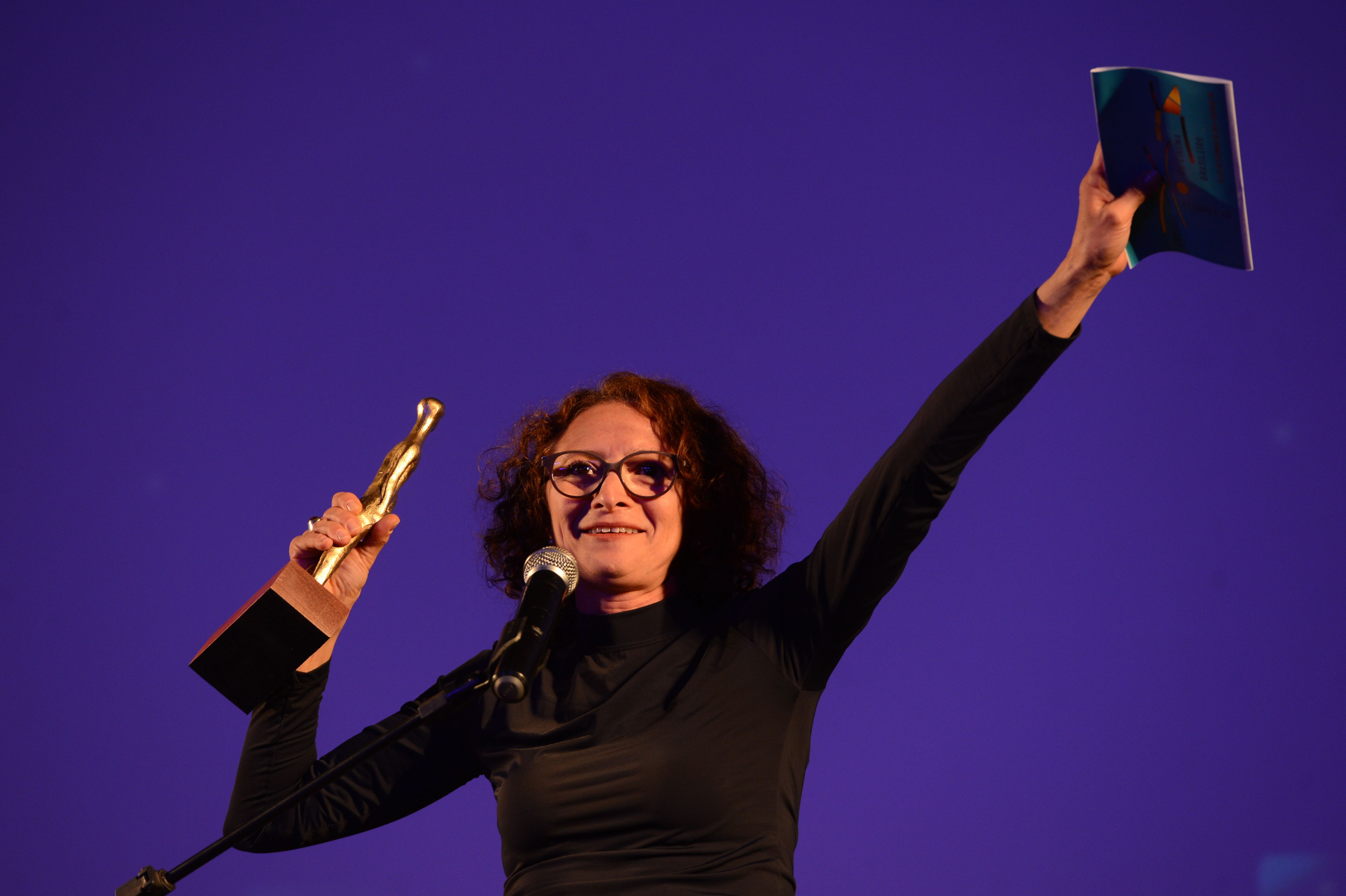
- Born: 27 October 1963 (age 62); Cajazeiras, Paraíba, Brazil
- Occupation: Actress
- Years active: 1985–present

Marcélia Cartaxo (born 27 October 1963) is a Brazilian actress. She has appeared in more than 30 films and television shows since 1985. She won the Silver Bear for Best Actress at the 36th Berlin International Film Festival for her role in Hour of the Star.

== Selected filmography ==
- Hour of the Star (1985)
- Amélia (2000)
- Madame Satã (2002)
- The History of Eternity (2014)
- Pacarrete: Margarida em francês (2020)
- New Bandits (2023)
