= Hans Brenner (actor) =

Austrian actor (1938–1998)

- Born: 9 August 1938; Innsbruck, Austria
- Died: 4 September 1998 (aged 60); Munich, Germany
- Occupation: Actor
- Years active: 1953–1998

Hans Brenner (9 August 1938 – 4 September 1998) was an Austrian actor. He appeared in more than eighty films from 1953 to 1998. He was the father of actor Moritz Bleibtreu.

== Selected filmography ==
Year	Title	Role	Director	Notes
1969	Die Revolte	Dieter Hartenstein	Reinhard Hauff	TV film
1971	Mathias Kneissl	Mathias Kneißl	Reinhard Hauff	
1973	The Experts		Norbert Kückelmann	
1974	Eiger	Tiger Voigt	Dieter Wedel	TV film
1975	Knife in the Back	Hans Eder	Ottokar Runze	
1978	Knife in the Head	Scholz	Reinhard Hauff	
1980	Das eine Glück und das andere	Gottfried Wiesinger	Axel Corti	TV film
1997	Death Game	Hanns Martin Schleyer	Heinrich Breloer	TV film
