= Gisela Fischer =

German-born actress

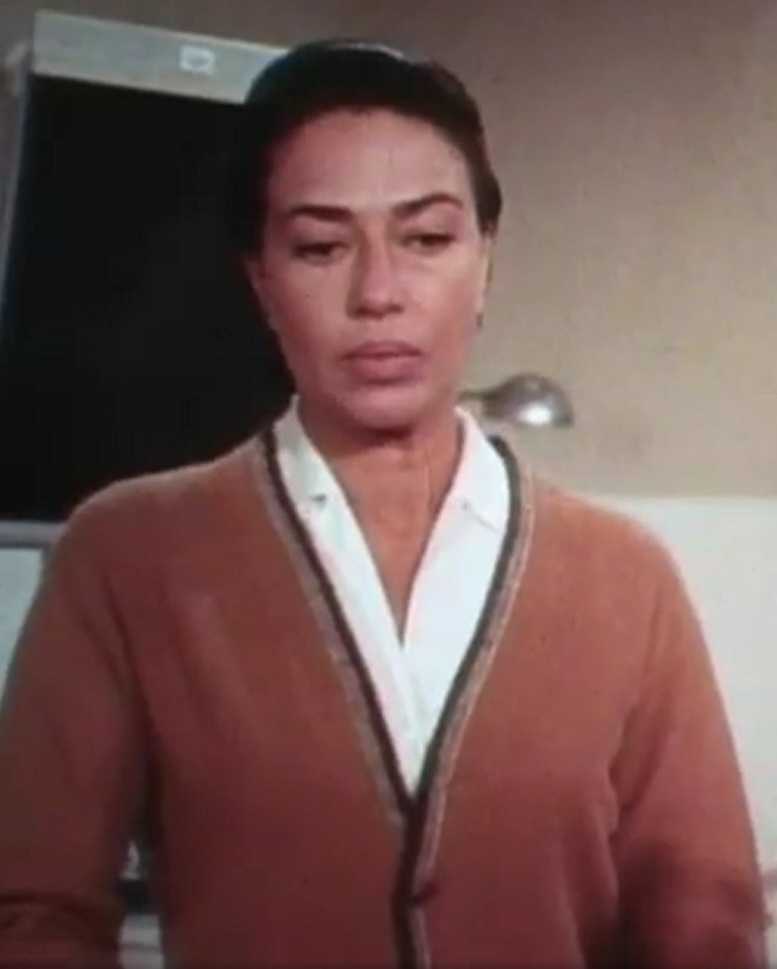
- Fischer in Torn Curtain (1966)
- Born: Gisela Angelica Bermann Fischer; 21 April 1929; Berlin, Germany
- Died: 19 June 2014 (aged 85); Zürich, Switzerland
- Occupation: Actress
- Years active: 1956–1987
- Father: Gottfried Bermann Fischer
- Relatives: Samuel von Fischer

Gisela Angelica Bermann Fischer (21 April 1929 – 19 June 2014) was a German actress and psychologist.

== Life and career ==
Fischer was born in Berlin in 1929, the daughter of Gottfried and Brigitte Bermann Fischer. Her parents ran the publishing house S. Fischer Verlag, founded by her maternal grandfather Samuel von Fischer. The Jewish Fischers fled from the Nazi German regime, and she grew up in a number of countries including Italy, Czechoslovakia and Japan before settling in Connecticut in 1940. She graduated from Sarah Lawrence College, and after the war returned to what was now West Germany.

After various stage and TV appearances, she made her film debut in 1960's Brücke des Schicksals. Her best-known role internationally was as Dr. Koska, a spy who helps Paul Newman and Julie Andrews' protagonists escape East Berlin, in Alfred Hitchcock's Cold War thriller Torn Curtain (1966). She was a regular fixture on West German teleplays.

After the 1980s, Fischer left acting to pursue a career as a child and family psychologist, relocating to Zurich with her family.

== Personal life ==
Fischer was married to Swiss actor Pinkas Braun, with whom she had a daughter.

She was involved in a years-long lawsuit over the Camille Pissarro painting "Le Quai Malaquais et l'Institut", which had been looted from her family by the Nazis in 1938. The suit was decided in her favor in 2009.

=== Death ===
Fischer died in Zurich on 19 June 2014, at the age of 85.

== Filmography ==
=== Film ===
Year	Title	Role	Notes
1960	Brücke des Schicksals	Editorial Secretary	
1961	Black Gravel	Margot	
1961	The Last of Mrs. Cheyney	Joan	
1966	Torn Curtain	Dr. Koska	
1970	Piggies	Edith	
1970	The Females	Dr. Barbara	
1973	The Experts		
1987	Ossegg oder Die Wahrheit über Hänsel und Gretel	Dr. Kirber	

=== Television ===
Year	Title	Role	Notes
1956	Der Verräter	Eva McKeon	TV movie
1957	Die Dreigroschenoper	Lucy Brown	TV movie
1957	Der verschwundene Graf	Secretary	TV movie
1958	Mein Sohn, der Herr Minister	Mona Courtois	TV movie
1959	Land, das meine Sprache spricht	Suzette Alberti	TV movie
1960	Instinkt ist alles	Jackie	TV movie
1961	Weihnachten auf dem Marktplatz	Mercedes	TV movie
1962	Tevya und seine Töchter	Tzeitl	TV movie
1962	Bluthochzeit	Frau	TV movie
1962	Ein netter Abend	Nora Phillips	TV movie
1963	Kapitän Karagöz	Flora	TV movie
1963	Verlorner Sohn	Cassandra	TV movie
1965	Plädoyer für einen Rebellen	Sedaria	TV movie
1967	Heinrich IV.	Marchesa Matilda Spina	TV movie
1967	Drei Jahre	Polinka	TV movie
1970	Der Kommissar	Marion	Episode: "Der Papierblumenmörder"
1971	Die Stimme hinter dem Vorhang	Beispiel 3	TV movie
1971	Die Unzufriedene	Marion	TV movie
1973	George		Episode: "George the Moviestar"
1973	Ein Fall für Männdli	Frau Kollin	Episode: "Lange Finger"
1974	Telerop 2009 - Es ist noch was zu retten	Fui Na	Episode: "Nichts als Sand"
1976	Der Winter, der ein Sommer war		Miniseries
1978	Tagebuch des Verführers	Tante	TV movie
1981	Derrick	Jane Robbins	Episode: "Eine ganz alte Geschichte"
1982	Irrgarten - Marco Ruschiz' Fahrt zu den Wolken	Frau Ruth	TV movie
1985–86	Ein Heim für Tiere	Frau Gissel	5 episodes

== Bibliography ==
- Chapman, James. Hitchcock and the Spy Film. Bloomsbury Publishing, 2017.
- Petropoulos, Jonathan. Goering's Man in Paris. Yale University Press, 2021.
- Pollack, Howard. Marc Blitzstein: His Life, His Work, His World. OUP USA 2012.
