= Mathias Kneissl (film) =

1971 film

- Directed by: Reinhard Hauff
- Written by: Martin Sperr; Reinhard Hauff
- Produced by: Philippe Pilliod
- Starring: Hans Brenner
- Cinematography: W. P. Hassenstein
- Music by: Peer Raben
- Release date: 1971
- Running time: 94 minutes
- Country: West Germany
- Language: German

Mathias Kneissl is a 1971 West German biographical drama film directed by Reinhard Hauff. It was entered into the 7th Moscow International Film Festival. The film follows the life of Mathias Kneißl, a 19th-century criminal who became a local legend.

== Plot ==
Mathias Kneißl is born in 1875 into a poor Bavarian family. The eldest son of innkeepers, he first runs into trouble with the law at 16 for attending a public dance and is sentenced to three days in jail. He later serves 38 days for repeated truancy, setting him on a path toward crime. Despite attempts to lead a normal life, Kneißl experiences deep injustice when police beat his father to death for poaching and local peasants burn down the family’s mill.

Seeking revenge on society, Kneißl goes underground in the Bavarian forests. He robs a village priest, shoots two gendarmes who later die from their injuries, and begins targeting wealthy landowners. After stealing two mortgage bonds from the Bavarian Mortgage Bank, a reward is offered for his capture. While most locals avoid confrontation, some see Kneißl—known for his large black hat—as a folk hero resisting state oppression and exploitation, although he keeps his loot for himself rather than sharing it.

Kneißl also attracts the admiration of some local women, but the authorities soon mount a major manhunt. In March 1901, after a force of 60 police officers tracks him to the Aumacher estate in Geisenhofen, Kneißl is captured and seriously wounded. He is tried, sentenced to death, and executed by beheading in Augsburg in February 1902. His skull is later displayed publicly at LMU Munich's Anatomical Institute building.

== Cast ==
- Hans Brenner as Mathias Kneißl
- Ruth Drexel as Res Kneißl, Mathias' Mutter
- Eva Mattes as Katharina Kneißl
- Hanna Schygulla as Mathilde Schreck
- Frank Frey as Alois Kneißl
- Péter Müller as Michl Pascolini, Bruder der Res
- Andrea Stary as Cilli Kneißl
- Kelle Riedl as Johann Patsch
- Alfons Scharf as Vater Kneißl
- Gustl Bayrhammer as Mühlbauer
- Rainer Werner Fassbinder as Flecklbauer
