= Ulla Berkéwicz =

German actress, author and publisher

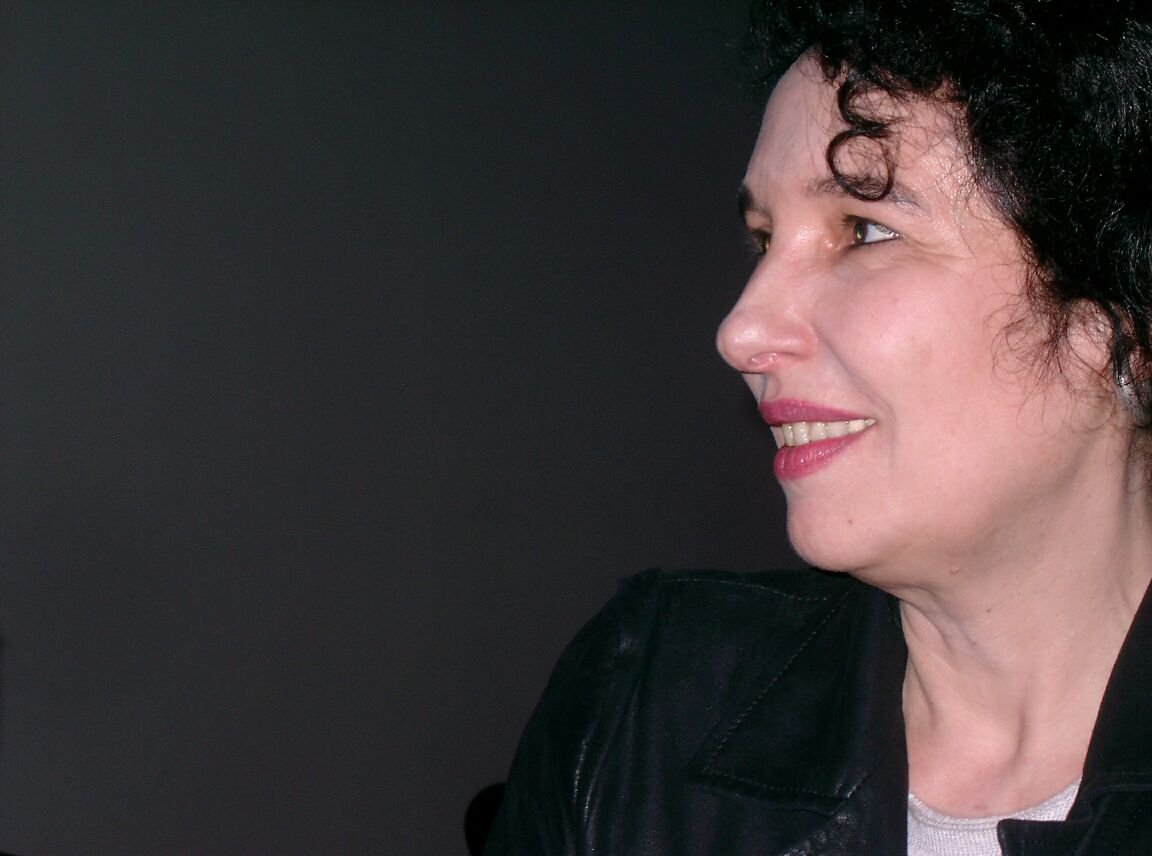
- Berkéwicz at Literaturhaus München, 2004
- Born: Ursula Schmidt; Gießen, Hesse, West Germany
- Occupations: Actress, writer, publisher
- Spouses: Wilfried Minks, Siegfried Unseld
- Parents: Werner Schmidt (father); Herta Stoepel (mother)

Ulla Berkéwicz (Ursula Unseld-Berkéwicz: born Ursula Schmidt) (born 5 November 1948) is a German actress, author and (more recently) publisher. The name "Berkéwicz", which she adopted in 1968 as a stage name, and by which she has since become generally known, is derived from the family name used by her Jewish grandmother, "Berkowitz".

== Life ==
Ursula Schmidt was born at Gießen, a midsized traditionally prosperous town in the hills to the north of Frankfurt. She was born on 5 November. For a number of years she told reporters she had been born in 1951, but the evident implausibility of this birth year in view of other conventional staging posts during her childhood and adolescence has become a talking point among commentators. That she was born on 5 November is relatively uncontested. Ursula Schmidt was born in the aftermath of the war during which the town had suffered heavy bombing. Her father was the physician-author Werner Schmidt, whose career opportunities had been brutally truncated during the twelve Hitler years due to a government decision to classify him as "half-Jewish". After the Hitler nightmare ended he took a position at the main hospital at Hanau where in 1965 he accepted an appointment as "Ārztlicher Direktor" ("Medical Director"). Ursula's mother, Herta Stoepel, was an actress. The child grew up with her family in a large first floor "Jugendstil" apartment in Hanau shared with parents, grandparents and a much younger brother, impatient to grow to adulthood and follow her mother into the acting profession. Berkéwicz would later describe her childhood in an autobiographical essay as having taken place "somewhere between anarchy and milkshakes". The "Hanau 67 Milk Bar" was a focal point of her adolescence. Childhood tensions were created by contrasting familial backgrounds, combining "fanatical Nazis" and a Jewish grandmother through whom she was related to Holocaust victims. In 1966, after successfully completing her secondary schooling at a remarkably young age, she progressed to the "Hochschule für Musik und Darstellende Kunst Frankfurt am Main" (HfMDK / "... University of Music and Performing Arts") in nearby Frankfurt am Main, where she remained as a student for three years.

She made her stage debut as Ulla Berkéwicz in 1970 at the Stuttgart State Theater, appearing in a Peter Palitzsch production. During the 1970s she undertook a succession of increasingly prominent stage engagements at major theaters in, most notably, Munich, Stuttgart, Cologne, Hamburg, Bochum and West Berlin. At around the same time she launched herself on a parallel career as a translator, specialising in classical drama. Playwrights whose works she translated into German included Calderón, Shakespeare and Synge. She was also undertaking occasional film work. In 1979/80 she took the lead role in "Geburt der Hexe" ("Birth of the witch"), a production from the set designer and film director Wilfried Minks, to whom, at that time, she was married. The production was inspired by historical themes.

In 1982 Ulla Berkéwicz published her first short story, "Josef stirbt" ("Josef dies"), a narrative in the first person, recalling the death of a ninety-year-old father. It was actually inspired by the death of her father-in-law. A paperback edition followed in 1985. The theme of death was one to which she would return. 1982 turned out to be the year during which she left the stage, relaunching herself as a freelance author and translator.

In 1987 she relocated to Frankfurt am Main. Her first written piece for stage, "Nur Wir", completed in 1991, received its premier at the Munich Kammerspiele (theatre) in April of that year, in a production staged by Urs Troller.

Organising the publication of her first narrative book, "Josef stirbt", brought Berkéwicz into contact with Suhrkamp Verlag, a widely respected publishing house based in Berlin. Suhrkamp agreed to publish "Josef stirbt". The negotiations also brought her into contact with Siegfried Unseld who had been a co-owner of the business since 1957, and who had led it since the death, in 1959, of Peter Suhrkamp. For the publishing business, the Unseld years, between 1959 and 2002, became something of a golden age. For Berkéwicz herself there was a powerfully personal element. Ulla Berkéwicz and Siegfried Unseld married in 1990. It was not the first marriage for either of them. They nevertheless stayed together till Unself died in 2002. Some years after Peter Unseld died, Berkéwicz published "Überlebnis". The two principal protagonists are named only as "the man" and "the woman", but commentators infer that the book is nothing less than a literary requiem by a still grieving widow, and implicitly a powerful celebration of a good marriage to a larger than life husband who had died. The third character in the book is one about whom Berkéwicz had already written powerfully, and with whom she appears to have enjoyed a certain level of insightful familiarity ever since, as a child, her father's work as a hospital doctor and her Jewish grandmother's talk of the "narrow gap" through which the dying ones depart, had ruled out any possibility of human dying being treated as an unmentionable matter within the family.

After she was widowed in 2002 Unseld-Berkéwicz was accepted as a member of the Suhrkamp top management team. In October 2003 shareholders agreed a reconfiguration and expansion of the management team where by Berkéwicz took over as chair of the main board with Günter Berg as her deputy. The changes were made following consultation with the "Authors' Advisory Committee", comprising a number of the publisher's best known scholar-authors, including Jürgen Habermas, Alexander Kluge, Adolf Muschg and Hans Magnus Enzensberger. A particularly eye-catching appointment at this time was that of Heinrich Lübbert, Berkéwicz's former divorce lawyer, as general counsel, the publisher's top in-house lawyer. Unseld-Berkéwicz was suddenly a wealthy woman, and it also became known that Lübbert had become her testamentary executor and a board member at the "Peter-Suhrkamp-Stiftung" ("...foundation"), which had been set up by the firm's founder in 1984 as one of several moves designed to give authors an enhanced role in political-commercial decision making. This was part of a broader set of developments, which also included a succession of court hearings, that gave rise to recurring reports of ructions at the top of Suhrkamp Verlag over the next few years.

With effect from 10 December 2015 Ursula Unseld-Berkéwicz stepped down from the management board, to be succeeded by Jonathan Landgrebe. She created a supervisory board comprising Rachel Salamander, Sylvia Ströher and herself, which she herself chairs.

== Membership ==
Ulla Berkéwicz is a member of the internationally networked PEN Centre Germany organisation.

== Published works ==
- Berkéwicz, Ulla (1982). Josef stirbt : Erzählung (in German). Frankfurt am Main: Suhrkamp. ISBN 978-3-518-02150-7. OCLC 9528351.
- —— (1984). Michel, sag ich (in German). Frankfurt am Main. ISBN 978-3-518-04693-7. OCLC 11561214.
- —— (1987). Adam. Frankfurt am Main: Suhrkamp. ISBN 978-3-518-02661-8. OCLC 15986962.
- —— (1988). Maria Maria : Drei Erzählungen (in German). Frankfurt am Main. ISBN 978-3-518-40124-8. OCLC 18772407.
- —— (1991). Nur wir : ein Schauspiel (in German). Frankfurt am Main. ISBN 978-3-518-40321-1. OCLC 24288432.
- —— (1992). Engel sind schwarz und weiss : Roman (in German). Frankfurt am Main: Suhrkamp. ISBN 978-3-518-40435-5. OCLC 26102339.
- —— (1995). Mordad (in Spanish). Frankfurt am Main: Suhrkamp. ISBN 978-3-518-40707-3. OCLC 33310814.
- ——; Schmidt, Lesch (1999). Der Golem in Bayreuth : ein Musiktheaterspiel (in German). Frankfurt am Main: Suhrkamp. ISBN 978-3-518-12116-0. OCLC 42431432.
- —— (1997). Zimzum (in German). Frankfurt am Main: Suhrkamp. ISBN 978-3-518-40849-0. OCLC 37770695.
- —— (1999). Ich weiss, dass du weisst : Roman (in German). Frankfurt: Suhrkamp. ISBN 978-3-518-41061-5. OCLC 41561260.
- —— (2002). Vielleicht werden wir ja verrückt : eine Orientierung in vergleichendem Fanatismus (in German). Frankfurt am Main: Suhrkamp. ISBN 978-3-518-41379-1. OCLC 53038565.
- —— (2008). Überlebnis (in German). Frankfurt am Main: Suhrkamp. ISBN 978-3-518-41955-7. OCLC 226354838.
- ——; Inspired by: Treichel, Hans Ulrich (2018). Über die Schrift hinaus (in German). Berlin. ISBN 978-3-518-42787-3. OCLC 1035561721.

== Awards ==
- 1983 Andreas Gryphius Prize, Förderpreis
- 1988 Märkisches Stipendium für Literatur
- 1995 Rheingau Literature Prize
- 2015 Luther Rose Prize
- 2016 Moses Mendelssohn Medal
