= Annemarie Seidel =

German actress (1894 - 1959)

Annemarie Seidel (born November 28, 1894, in Braunschweig - August 30, 1959 in Munich) was a German actress and proofreader.

== Life ==
Annemarie Seidel, called Mirl, was a younger sister of the writer Ina Seidel (1885–1974). When she was barely a year old, her family left Braunschweig, where Annemarie Seidel had been born. Her father, Hermann Seidel, took his own life in November 1895. The cause was presumably an impending disciplinary proceeding against the physician for incorrect treatment. The family first moved to Marburg and later to Munich, where Annemarie Seidel made a career as an actress at the beginning of the Weimar Republic. During this time, she met Carl Zuckmayer, with whom she lived together in 1921/22. After falling dangerously ill, she had to leave Zuckmayer's damp basement apartment in Matthäikirchstraße 4 - the writer Julius Elias lived in the same house. Her "savior" in this situation was the Dutch millionaire and musicologist Anthony van Hoboken. He became Annemarie Seidel's first husband. This marriage lasted from 1922 to 1932. In 1935 she married Peter Suhrkamp. Her marriage to Peter Suhrkamp suffered from Annemarie Seidel's alcoholism in later years. The divorce had already been decided, but Suhrkamp died on March 31, 1959, two days before the court hearing. Annemarie Seidel died only a few months later.

Annemarie Seidel worked as an editor for Suhrkamps Verlag. She also translated the novel The Grass Harp by Truman Capote into German together with Friedrich Podszus. Friedrich Podszus was also the heir to her last apartment in Munich's Ohmstraße.

== Correspondence ==
Annemarie Seidel and Carl Zuckmayer remained friends for many years. Their correspondence lasted until 1957 and was published in 2003.

The publication of Peter Suhrkamp's letters to his wife under the title Letters to Mirl was planned for May 2009. The letters date from the period between 1935 and Peter Suhrkamp's death in 1959. They had long been considered lost. Letters from Annemarie Seidel to Peter Suhrkamp had not been found until then. In May 2009, however, the editor Wolfgang Schopf found more than 40 letters from Annemarie Seidel to her husband from the period from April 1944 to February 1945. The project Letters to Mirl was thus expanded at the last moment. On March 28, 2016, Peter Suhrkamp's 125th birthday, a total of 450 letters that Suhrkamp and Annemarie Seidel had exchanged were finally published under the title "Nun leb wohl! And be well!" were published.
