= Ruth Drexel =

German actress (1930–2009)

- Drexel as Resi Berghammer in Der Bulle von Tölz (2005)
- Born: 12 July 1930; Vilshofen an der Donau, Lower Bavaria, Weimar Republic
- Died: 26 February 2009 (aged 78); Feldkirchen, Germany
- Occupation: Actress
- Years active: 1949–2009

Ruth Drexel (German: [ʁuːt ˈdʁɛksl̩]; 12 July 1930 – 26 February 2009) was a German actress, director, and theatre director/manager. Her best-known role was as "Resi Berghammer" in the German television series, Der Bulle von Tölz, in which she played the mother of the eponymous cop. As of January 2006, she played the role in 58 episodes.

== Life and career ==
Born in Vilshofen an der Donau, near Passau, Drexel trained as an actress in Munich, where she was also given her first engagement. She subsequently worked in Berlin (as a member of the Berliner Ensemble during 1955–56), Wuppertal, Darmstadt and Düsseldorf. She also appeared, to great critical acclaim, in new plays by Franz Xaver Kroetz and Felix Mitterer. In 1980, she co-founded the Tiroler Volksschauspiele in Telfs, Tyrol.

Drexel's early television work included Wedekind's Der Marquis von Keith (1962), a German adaptation of Shaw's Candida (1963), Frisch's Biedermann und die Brandstifter (1967), and Kroetz's Wildwechsel (Jail Bait), directed by Rainer Werner Fassbinder (1972). She also put in guest appearances on Der Kommissar and Tatort.

Drexel was a member of the cast of the cult television series Münchner Geschichten (1974) and Zur Freiheit (1987). In 2005, she started a new television series, Agathe kann's nicht lassen, playing Agathe Heiland, an elderly sleuth modelled on Agatha Christie's Miss Marple.

== Family ==
Ruth Drexel was married once, to Michael Adami. They had a daughter, Katharina Adami (b. 1956). Drexel had a second child, Cilli Drexel (b. 1975) by her long-time companion, actor Hans Brenner.

== Death ==
Drexel's long-time companion, actor Hans Brenner, died in 1998. Until her own death from cancer in 2009, aged 78, Ruth Drexel lived in Feldkirchen, near Munich.

== Filmography ==
Year	Title	Role	Notes
1949	Heimliches Rendezvous	Therese	
1957	Between Munich and St. Pauli	Urschel	
1957	Jägerblut	Josepha	
1965	The Blood of the Walsungs	Theaterbesucherin	
1969	Die Perle – Aus dem Tagebuch einer Hausgehilfin	Emilie Knusefranz	TV series
1971	Mathias Kneissl	Res Kneißl, Mathias' Mutter	
1972	Adele Spitzeder	Adele Spitzeder	TV film
1972	Jail Bait	Hilda Schneider	TV film
1976	The Marquise of O	Die Hebamme	
1979	Schluchtenflitzer	Schwaigerin	
1980–1981	Derrick	Frau Kieler / Franziska Sailer	2 episodes
1986	Heilt Hitler!	Frau im Hofgarten vor Weltkriegsmausoleum	
1987	Francesca		
1989	Mix Wix	Radfahrer	
1997	Bandagistenglück	Werneck	
