= Verlag der Weltreligionen =

German publisher

Verlag der Weltreligionen ("Publisher of World Religions") is a German publishing house in collaboration with the Suhrkamp Verlag dedicated to the foundational texts of the world's major religious traditions. It was founded in 2007, and serves both as an edition project for primary sources and as a platform for scholarly discussion of religious phenomena across diverse historical and cultural contexts.

== Introduction ==
The publisher's core program includes critical editions of writings from Hinduism, Buddhism, Confucianism, Daoism, Judaism, Christianity, and Islam. It also releases source texts from smaller religious communities (not all of them "Weltreligionen"), some of them translated into German for the first time. All works are newly translated from the original languages by scholars of religion and philology, accompanied by commentary on their origins, transmission, and reception, with particular attention to interreligious connections. The publishers editorial projects are supported extensively by the Udo Keller Stiftung Forum Humanum.

In addition to source editions, the series comprises major wisdom texts, interreligious dialogues, anthologies, introductions, monographs, and essay collections on historical and contemporary religious developments, including studies on modern forms of religious fundamentalism.

Ulla Unseld-Berkéwicz (Suhrkamp Verlag) wrote an editorial.

The first publication of the house was a four-hundred-page almanac: Die Religionen der Welt. Ein Almanach zur Eröffnung des Verlags der Weltreligionen.

The last publication in the catalogue of the GNB dates from 2023.

== Overview ==
Volumes (by year of publication) - in selection

=== 2007 ===
- Die Religionen der Welt. Hans-Joachim Simm. 2007.
- Das Buch der Vierzig Hadithe. Yaḥyā Ibn Sharaf al-Nawawī. 2007.
- Einführung in den Buddhismus. Michael von Brück. 2007.
- Bhagavad Gita. Michael von Brück. 2007.
- Die elementaren Formen des religiösen Lebens. Emile Durkheim. 2007.
- Vom rechten Leben. Buddhistische Lehren aus Indien und Tibet. Michael Hahn. 2007.
- Einführung in die Mischna. Michael Krupp. 2007.
- Die Mischna Festzeiten. Michael Krupp. 2007.
- Gottes Eifer. Peter Sloterdijk. 2007.
- Gotteslästerung. Jean-Pierre Wils. 2007.
- Rig-Veda – Erster und zweiter Liederkreis. Michael E. J. Witzel, Toshifumi Gotō. 2007.

=== 2008 ===
- Gespräch eines Philosophen, eines Juden und eines Christen. Lateinisch-deutsch. Peter Abaelard. 2008.
- Gegen die Heiden. Über die Menschwerdung des Wortes Gottes. Über die Beschlüsse der Synode von Nizäa. Athanasius von Alexandrien. 2008.
- Ägyptische Religion. Totenliteratur. Jan Assmann, Andrea Kucharek. 2008.
- Vijnana Bhairava. Bettina Bäumer. 2008.
- Der eigene Gott. Ulrich Beck. 2008.
- Religion – Segen oder Fluch der Menschheit?. Michael von Brück. 2008.
- Religion und Politik in Tibet. Michael von Brück. 2008.
- Das Gedächtnis der Frömmigkeit. Wolfgang Frühwald. 2008.
- Ich sah den Satan …. René Girard. 2008.
- Wege zur rechten Erkenntnis. Michael Hahn, Siglinde Dietz. 2008.
- Sefer Jezira. Klaus Herrmann. 2008.
- Gitagovinda. Jayadeva. 2008.
- Gnosis. Hans Jonas. 2008.
- Die Mischna Schädigungen. Michael Krupp. 2008.
- Einführung in die lurianische Kabbala. Gerold Necker. 2008.
- Jinsilu. Wolfgang Ommerborn. 2008.
- Gespräche mit seinen Schülern. Shri Ramakrishna. 2008.
- Kommunismus als Religion. Michail Ryklin. 2008.
- Kampf der Fundamentalismen. Heinrich Wilhelm Schäfer. 2008.
- Weibliche Gottesbilder. Peter Schäfer. 2008.
- Über die Religion. Friedrich Schleiermacher. 2008.
- Im Geist des Ostens leben. Martin Tamcke. 2008.
- Heilige Schriften. Udo Tworuschka. 2008.
- Manual für den Kampf der Kulturen. Stefan Weidner. 2008.

=== 2009 ===
- Die »doctrina christiana« als Wissenschaft. Thomas von Aquin. 2009.
- Dialektische Theologie. Karl Barth. 2009.
- Vielleicht werden wir ja verrückt. Ulla Berkéwicz. 2009.
- Konfuzius – Geschichte seines Lebens. Annping Chin. 2009.
- Worte kennen. Zhiyan Hu Hong. 2009.
- Das Buch der Weisungen für Frauen. Abu l-Faradj Ibn al-Djauzi. 2009.
- Weltreligionen Verstehen. Karl Kardinal Lehmann. 2009.
- Yijing. Dennis Schilling. 2009.
- Wohlstand, Glück und langes Leben. Helwig Schmidt-Glintzer. 2009.
- Wozu Gott?. 2009.
- Wege des Yoga. Svami Vivekananda. 2009.

=== 2010 ===
- Religion und Gesellschaft. 2010.
- Neureligionen und ihre Kulte. Douglas E. Cowan, David G. Bromley. 2010.
- Baha'u'llah, Brief an den Sohn des Wolfes. Armin Eschraghi. 2010.
- Ibn Rushd, Maßgebliche Abhandlung. Frank Griffel. 2010.
- Das Buch Hiob. Hans-Peter Mathys, Gerhard Kaiser. 2010.
- Die Mischna Frauen. Michael Krupp. 2010.
- Der Koran als Text der Spätantike. Angelika Neuwirth. 2010.
- Judenhaß und Judenfurcht. Peter Schäfer. 2010.
- Religion im modernen Tourismus. Michael Stausberg. 2010.
- Mekhilta de-Rabbi Jishma'el. Günter Stemberger. 2010.
- Mechthild von Magdeburg. Gisela Vollmann-Profe. 2010.

=== 2011 ===
- Die Kultur der Ambiguität. Thomas Bauer. 2011.
- Aus dem Guru Granth Sahib. Martin Kämpchen, Tilak Raj Chopra. 2011.
- Der Koran Bd. 1. Angelika Neuwirth. 2011.
- Die Ursprünge der jüdischen Mystik. Peter Schäfer. 2011.
- Die Ursprünge (EPUB). Peter Schäfer. 2011.
- Mahabharata. Georg von Simson. 2011.
- Al Suhrawardi. Nicolai Sinai. 2011.
- Szenen des Heiligen. Cai Werntgen. 2011.
- Mazu Daoyi und Dazhu Huihai. Grundlegende Reden und Aufzeichnungen der Hongzhou-Schule des Chan-Buddhismus. Christian Wittern. 2011.

=== 2012 ===
- Kojiki – Aufzeichnung alter Begebenheiten. Klaus Antoni. 2012.
- Islam und Moderne. Rachid Benzine. 2012.
- Indiens mystische Erotik. Mircea Eliade. 2012.
- Der Diwan. Renate Jacobi. 2012.
- Sohar – Schriften aus dem Buch des Glanzes. Gerold Necker. 2012.
- Der Rigveda und seine Religion. Thomas Oberlies. 2012.
- Lateinische Hymnen. Alex Stock. 2012.

=== 2013 ===
- Deutscher Kirchengesang in der Neuzeit. Gustav Adolf Krieg. 2013.
- Die Mischna Saaten. Michael Krupp. 2013.
- Samyutta-Nikāya. Konrad Meisig. 2013.
- Visnupurāṇa. Peter Schreiner. 2013.
- Lieder von Hingabe. Eva Wilden. 2013.
- Rig-Veda – Dritter bis fünfter Liederkreis. 2013.

=== 2014 ===
- Die Vielfalt religiöser Erfahrung. William James. 2014.
- Reformation der Frömmigkeit. Martin Luther. 2014.
- Aufbruch der Reformation. Martin Luther. 2014.
- Jingde chuandeng lu. Christian Wittern. 2014.

=== 2015 ===
- Der Buddhismus des Reinen Landes. Christoph Kleine. 2015.
- Die Mischna Heiligkeiten. Michael Krupp. 2015.
- Kirche und Schule. Martin Luther. 2015.
- Christ und Welt. Martin Luther. 2015.
- Filaret von Moskau. Martin Tamcke. 2015.

=== 2016 ===
- Schriften Vier Bände. Martin Luther. 2016.

=== 2017 ===
- Religio duplex. Jan Assmann. 2017.
- Die Mischna Reinheiten. Michael Krupp. 2017.
- Der Koran Band 2/1. Angelika Neuwirth. 2017.

=== 2018 ===
- Ägyptische Götterliteratur. Jan Assmann, Andrea Kucharek. 2018.
- Amerikanische Religion. Michael Hochgeschwender. 2018.
- Das Hohelied. Stefan Schreiner. 2018.

=== 2019 ===
- Upanischaden. Walter Slaje. 2019.

=== 2021 ===
- Der Koran Bd. 2/2. Angelika Neuwirth. 2021.

=== 2022 ===
- Die Spiritualität der Tantras. Abhinavagupta. 2022.
- Rig-Veda – Sechster und siebter Liederkreis. Toshifumi Gotō, Eijirō Ōyama. 2022.
- Das Neue Testament. Deutsch. Martin Luther. 2022.

=== 2023 ===
- Vom Jesus der Geschichte zum Christus des Dogmas. Géza Vermes. 2023.

== See also ==
- Diederichs Gelbe Reihe (in German)
