= Berlin Now =

2014 book by Peter Schneider

Berlin Now: The City After the Wall
- First edition (US)
- Author: Peter Schneider
- Translator: Sophie Schlondorff
- Language: English
- Subject: Berlin
- Publisher: Farrar, Straus and Giroux (US); Penguin Books (UK)
- Publication date: August 2014
- Pages: 336
- ISBN: 978-0241006139

Berlin Now: The City After the Wall (also published as Berlin Now: The Rise of the City and the Fall of the Wall) is a 2014 book by German writer Peter Schneider.

== Background and synopsis ==
Published on the 25th anniversary of the Fall of the Berlin Wall, Berlin Now is a story of how Berlin has changed since reunification to become Europe's most vibrant melting-pot of artists, immigrants and entrepreneurs. Berlin Now is described as a "longtime Berliner's bright, bold, and digressive exploration of the heterogeneous allure of this vibrant city." The book combines memoir, history, anecdote and reportage on subjects as diverse as the differences between the sex lives of former East and West Berliners to the present-day hidden quirks of the city.

== Reception ==
David Hugh Smith, for The Christian Science Monitor praised Berlin Now as "engrossing" writing that Schneider deserves plaudits. However, Smith did criticise how "Schneider veers alarmingly off course with chapters not so much about Berlin but about overarching German issues – about, for example, the Stasi, and immigration."

Writing for the Quarterly Conversation, Katy Derbyshire a Berlin-based German-language translator was more critical of Berlin Now, writing that "Schneider reveals himself as a gnarled Cold Warrior who has been stricken with many of the maladies common to his generation. With the specter of Communism exorcized, his new enemy is Islam." Derbyshire wrote that Schneider's "representation of ethnic minorities in Berlin Now is strictly black-and-white—as either victims or perpetrators of crimes, rarely active agents....Instead of a depiction of a diverse and fast-evolving minority making in-roads into the city’s intellectual, cultural, and business life, what Schneider gives us is an attack on Muslims." Derbyshire concluded "What Peter Schneider gives us in Berlin Now is his own very limited perspective on present-day Berlin."

In The New York Times Nicholas Kulish writes that "Schneider seeks to explain why the city became 'the capital of creative people from around the world today.'" Kulish, however is critical of Schneider "pontificating" about Muslim immigrants and his apparent praise for anti-Muslim politicians.
