= Mathias Kneißl =

German murderer (1875–1902)

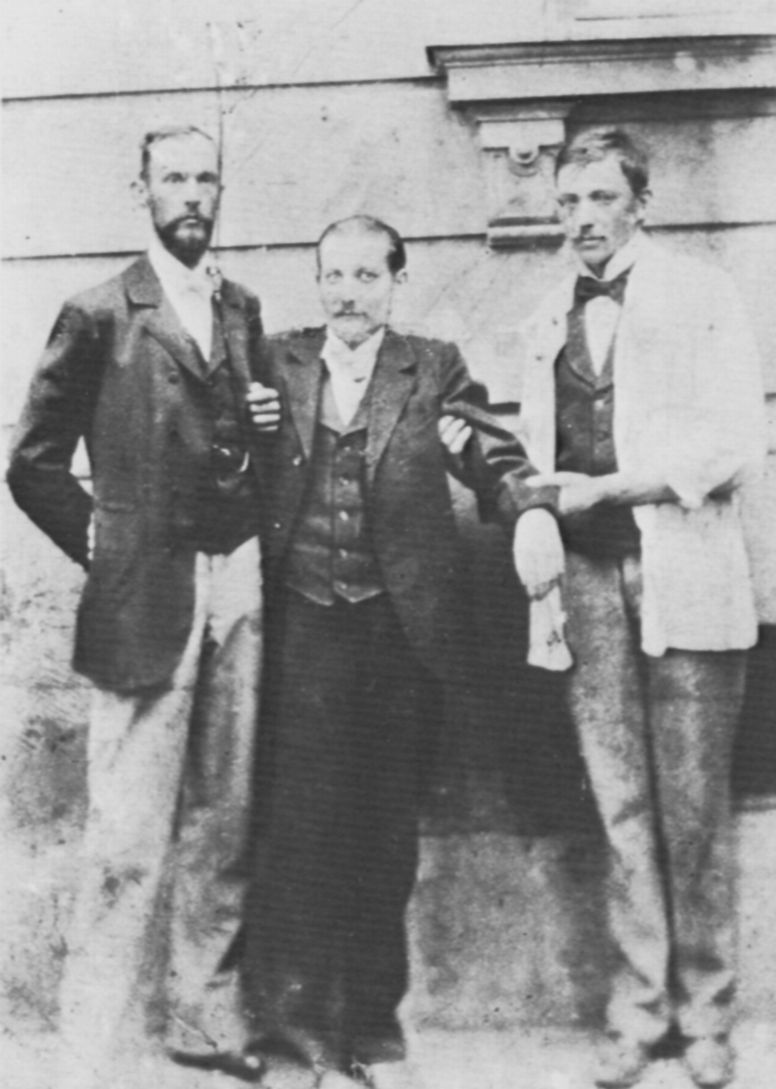
- Heavily injured from his last gunfight, Mathias Kneißl (centre) is being held by two nurses
- Born: 4 August 1875; Erdweg, Kingdom of Bavaria, German Empire
- Died: 21 February 1902 (aged 26); Augsburg, Kingdom of Bavaria, German Empire
- Status: Executed by guillotine
- Convictions: Murder (2 counts); Attempted murder Armed robbery Extortion
- Penalty: Death

Mathias Kneißl (4 August 1875 – 21 February 1902), also known as Robber Kneissl (German: Räuber Kneißl, Austro-Bavarian: Raiba Kneißl) was a German outlaw, poacher and popular antihero in Bavarian folklore, especially in the district of Dachau when the Kingdom of Bavaria was part of the German Empire. He is most well known for his face-offs with local policemen, who were already widely considered to be corrupt and who were further disliked for being Franconians who could not speak the local Upper Bavarian dialect. Kneißl became a local folk hero after repeatedly escaping and humiliating the police. According to German forensic scientist Mark Benecke, Kneißl never saw himself as a Robin Hood figure and was, in reality, "just a man who went astray with no way of getting back."

== Early life ==
Mathias Kneißl was born on 4 August 1875 in Unterweikertshofen, Dachau, Bavaria, as the eldest of six children of a poor innkeeper. In 1886 his parents purchased a mill in Sulzemoos which ended up being in "a strategically remote location", and was often used as a secret meeting place for local criminals.

== Career ==
Kneißl began poaching with his brothers at an early age. At age 16 he was imprisoned for the first time after members of his family were suspected of cattle raiding. His father was arrested for plundering the pilgrimage shrine of Herrgottsruh at Friedberg in 1892 and died soon after while in police custody in the town of Dachau. Soon after, Kneißl's mother was also arrested and imprisoned for poaching and her sons began to skip school to go poaching.

On 2 November 1893, police officers Gösswein and Förtsch arrived at the mill to arrest Mathias and his brother Alois for poaching. Instead of surrendering peacefully, the Kneißl brothers opened fire, severely wounded both officers, and fled the scene. After being arrested a few days later, Mathias and Alois were put on trial for robbery, poaching, receiving stolen goods, resisting arrest, and attempted murder. They were found guilty, and Alois was sentenced to 15 years imprisonment. Mathias received a sentence of 6 years.

After serving his sentence, Mathias was released in February 1899 and worked as a carpenter in Nußdorf am Inn. After six months he was fired because his colleagues refused to work with him any longer. Due to his bad reputation, he was unable to find another job.

For two years, Kneißl was pursued by the police. After his accomplices were arrested, he continued committing armed robberies on his own. An attempt to arrest him occurred on 30 November 1900 in Irchenbrunn, Altomünster. After a shootout, two policemen were critically injured and later died. Three months later, in March 1901, Kneißl was captured at Egenhofen by 60 policemen. After another gunfight, Kneißl was seriously injured by a bullet in the abdomen.

== Trial ==
Between 14 and 19 November 1901 Kneißl was placed on trial at Augsburg. He was charged with two murders, attempted murder, as well as armed robbery and extortion. At his trial, which was followed by the media with great attention, Kneißl said:

As my bad luck would have it I had to go to the same school right up to my 17th year, just because Pastor Endl could not stand me and kept harassing me. Many of my friends left school long before I learned as much as the others. For the final exams, I was the only one told to do a calculation on the blackboard. I didn't want to do it. I don't accept unfairness. I will not bow even if it kills me.

Kneißl confessed to most of the charges, but denied an intent to kill against the two policemen whom he shot and killed. However, the court found him guilty of murder, premeditated bodily harm with fatal consequences, extortion, and aggravated robbery. He was sentenced to receive the death penalty for murder and 15 years imprisonment on the other charges. Sentenced on a Monday, Kneißl allegedly sarcastically remarked: "Well, that's a good start of a week."

Judge Anton Rebholz appealed by letter to the Ministry of Justice, which confirmed Kneißl's death sentence. Kneißl was awakened shortly after seven o'clock on the morning of 21 February 1902, and was executed via guillotine.

== Legacy ==
Kneißl was already a legendary figure in his own lifetime. The people, especially poor Bavarian farmers, saw him favorably as a rebellious figure. His story remains popular to this day as a folk legend. Musical examples include the songs "Kneissl" by Georg Ringsgwandl (1993) and "Schachermüller-Hiasl" by Schandmaul (2016).

Three German films are based on his life story: Mathias Kneissl by Reinhard Hauff (1971), The Proud and Sad Life of Mathias Kneissl by Oliver Herbrich (1980) and Räuber Kneißl by Marcus H. Rosenmüller (2008).
