= Feldkirchen, Upper Bavaria =

Municipality in Munich, Germany

Feldkirchen
- Municipality
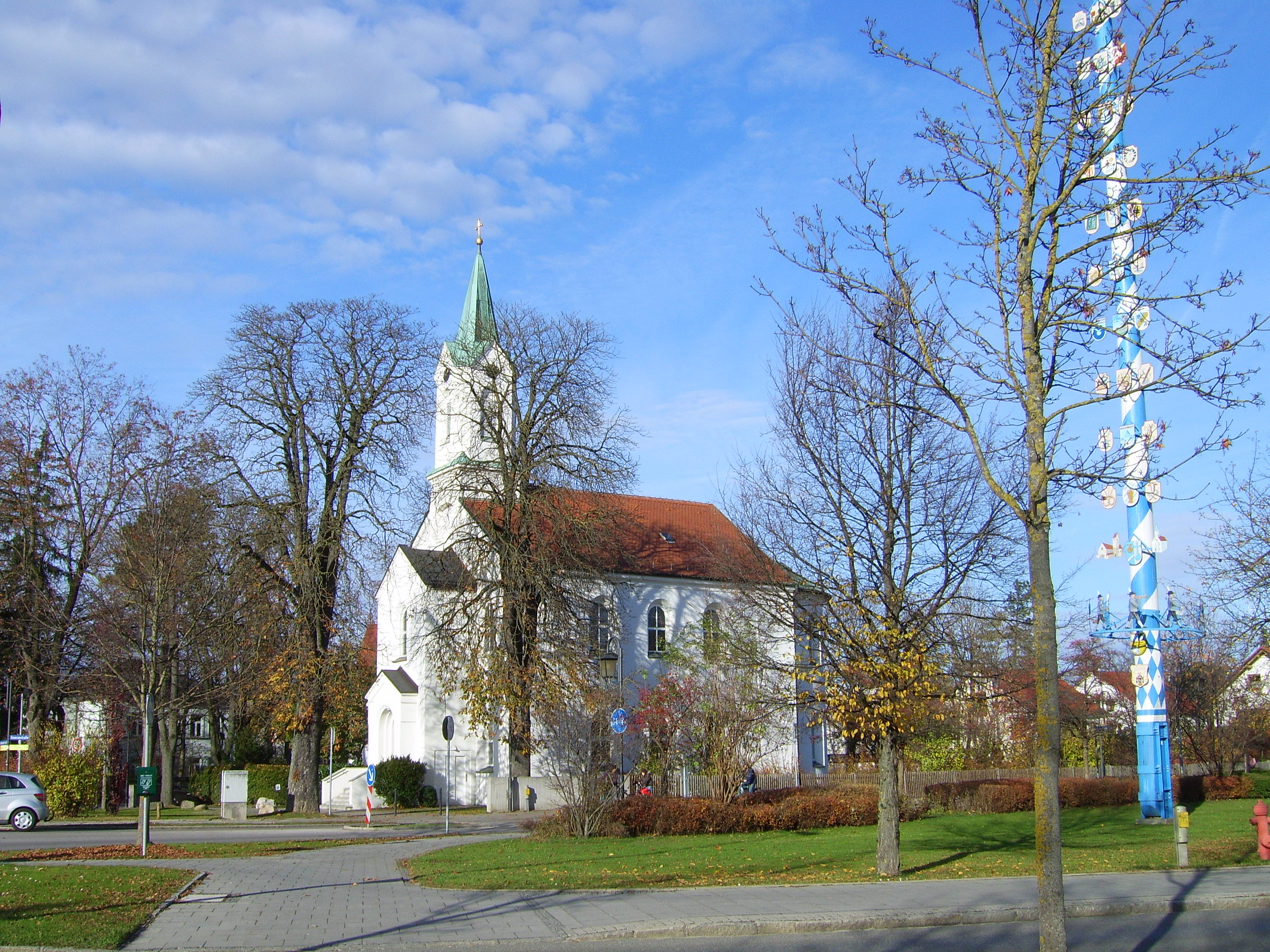
- Protestant church

- Coat of arms

- Location of Feldkirchen within Munich district
- Interactive map of Feldkirchen
- Location within Germany Location within Bavaria
- Coordinates: 48°9′N 11°44′E
- Country: Germany
- State: Bavaria
- Admin. region: Oberbayern
- District: Munich

Government
  - Mayor (2020–26): Andreas Janson

Area
  - Total: 6.41 km^{2} (2.47 sq mi)
- Elevation: 523–631 m (1,716–2,070 ft)

Population (2025-12-31)
  - Total: 7,720
  - Density: 1,200/km^{2} (3,120/sq mi)
- Time zone: UTC+01:00 (CET)
  - Summer (DST): UTC+02:00 (CEST)
- Postal codes: 85622
- Dialling codes: 089
- Vehicle registration: M
- Website: www.feldkirchen.de

Feldkirchen (German pronunciation: [fɛltˈkɪʁçn̩]) is a municipality in the district of Munich, Bavaria, Germany. It is located 10 km east of Munich and has 5,987 inhabitants. Feldkirchen was first mentioned in a document dated 853.

Feldkirchen is home to Steico, a company for building products made from renewable raw materials.

== Famous people ==
- Ruth Drexel, actress and director

== Gallery ==
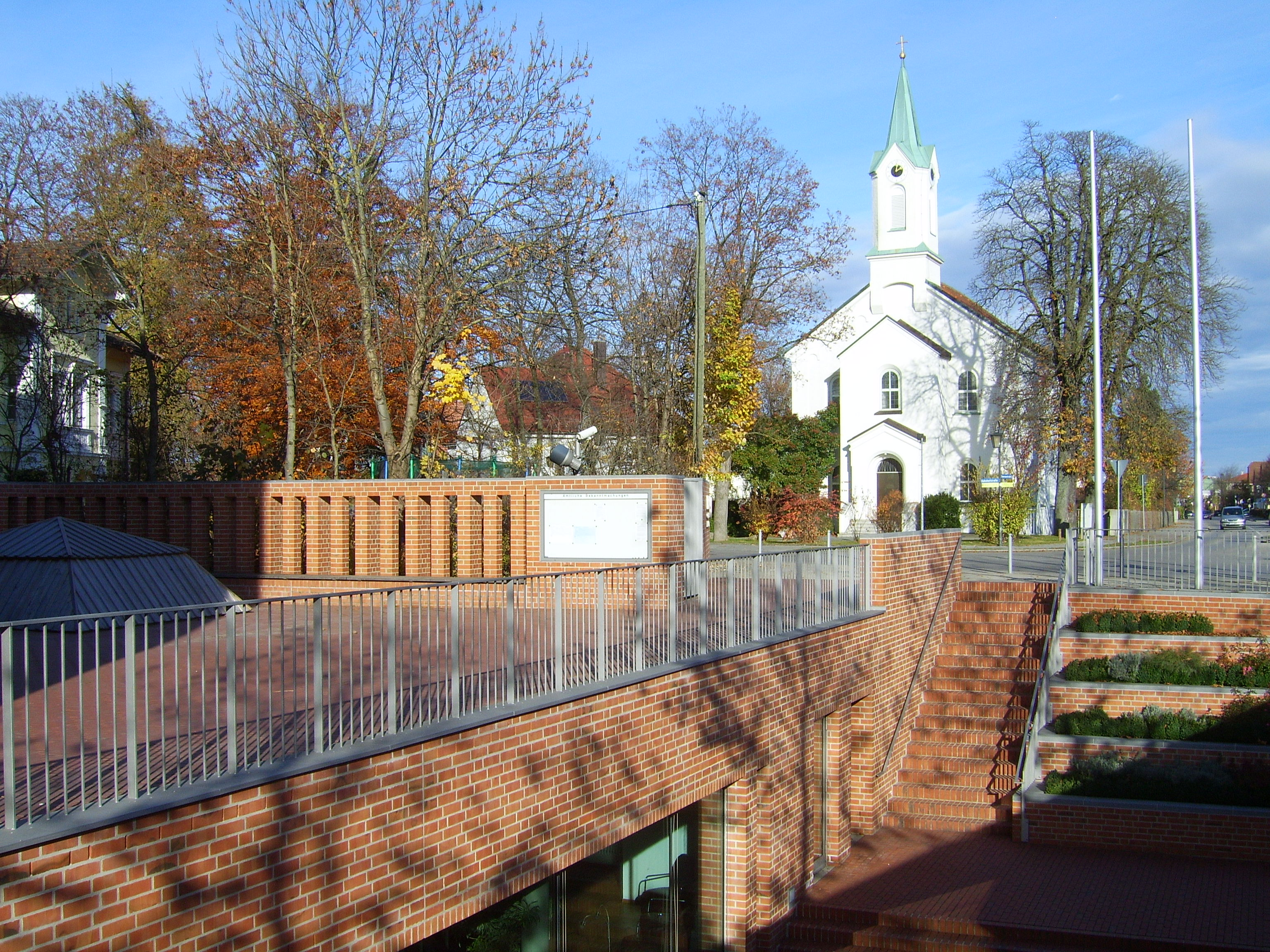
The Protestant church (view from town hall)
