= 23rd Berlin International Film Festival =

1973 film festival in West Berlin, Germany

- Festival poster
- Location: West Berlin, Germany
- Founded: 1951
- Awards: Golden Bear: Distant Thunder
- Festival date: 22 June – 3 July 1973
- Website: Website

Berlin International Film Festival chronology
- 24th 22nd

The 23rd Berlin International Film Festival was held from 22 June to 3 July 1973. The Golden Bear was awarded to Distant Thunder, directed by Satyajit Ray.

== Juries ==
The following people were announced as being on the jury for the festival:

=== Main Competition ===
- David Robinson, British writer and film critic - Jury President
- Freddy Buache, Swiss journalist and film historian
- Hiram García Borja, Mexican director of the Banco Nacional Cinematrográfico
- Eberhard Hauff, West-German filmmaker
- Harish Khanna, Indian director of the International Film Festival of India
- Paul Moor, American journalist and writer
- Walter Müller-Bringmann, West-German journalist and film critic
- René Thévenet, French producer
- Paolo Valmarana, Italian journalist and film critic

== Official Sections ==
=== Main Competition ===
The following films were in competition for the Golden Bear award:

English Title	Original Title	Director(s)	Production Country
The 14		David Hemmings	United Kingdom
All Nudity Shall Be Punished	Toda Nudez Será Castigada	Arnaldo Jabor	Brazil
Between Friends		Donald Shebib	Canada
Belladonna of Sadness	哀しみのベラドンナ	Eiichi Yamamoto	Japan
The Blockhouse		Clive Rees	United Kingdom
Distant Thunder	অশনি সংকেত	Satyajit Ray	India
The Experts	Die Sachverständigen	Norbert Kückelmann	West Germany
Georgia, Georgia		Stig Björkman	Sweden, United States
Habla, mudita		Manuel Gutiérrez Aragón	Spain
Long Live the Island Frogs	섬 개구리 만세	Jung Jin-woo	South Korea
Love Comes Quietly		Nikolai van der Heyde	Belgium, Netherlands
Malicious	Malizia	Salvatore Samperi	Italy
Metzitzim	מציצים	Uri Zohar	Israel
Property Is No Longer a Theft	La proprietà non è più un furto	Elio Petri	Italy, France
The Seven Madmen	Los siete locos	Leopoldo Torre Nilsson	Argentina
The Tall Blond Man with One Black Shoe	Le Grand Blond avec une chaussure noire	Yves Robert	France
The Tenderness of Wolves	Die Zärtlichkeit der Wölfe	Ulli Lommel	West Germany
There's No Smoke Without Fire	Il n'y a pas de fumée sans feu	André Cayatte	France
U-Turn		George Kaczender	Canada
Wedding in Blood	Les Noces rouges	Claude Chabrol	France

=== Out of competition ===
- Duel, directed by Steven Spielberg (United States)
- Emperor of the North Pole, directed by Robert Aldrich (United States)

== Official Awards ==
The following prizes were awarded by the Jury:

- Golden Bear: Distant Thunder by Satyajit Ray
- Silver Bear – Special Jury Prize: There's No Smoke Without Fire by André Cayatte
- Silver Bear:
  - The 14 by David Hemmings
  - All Nudity Shall Be Punished by Arnaldo Jabor
  - The Experts by Norbert Kückelmann
  - The Tall Blond Man with One Black Shoe by Yves Robert
  - The Seven Madmen by Leopoldo Torre Nilsson

== Independent Awards ==
=== FIPRESCI Award ===
- Wedding in Blood by Claude Chabrol
