= Gottfried Bermann Fischer =

German publisher (1897–1995)

- Born: 31 July 1897; Gleiwitz, Silesia
- Died: 17 September 1995 (aged 98); Camaiore
- Education: University of Breslau; University of Freiburg; Ludwig-Maximilians-Universität München (LMU)
- Occupation: Publisher

Gottfried Bermann, later Gottfried Bermann Fischer (31 July 1897, Gleiwitz, Silesia – 17 September 1995, Camaiore), was a German publisher. He was the son-in-law of Samuel Fischer, the founder of the S. Fischer Verlag, and, following Fischer’s death, assumed joint management of the publishing house together with his wife, Brigitte Bermann Fischer.

== Biography ==
Gottfried Bermann was born in Gleiwitz, Upper Silesia, as the son of the Jewish medical officer Salomon Bermann. After completing his education at a humanistic Gymnasium, he volunteered for military service. Having served as an officer in the First World War, he studied medicine at the University of Breslau, University of Freiburg and Ludwig-Maximilians-Universität München (LMU). He subsequently worked as a surgical assistant at the Krankenhaus Friedrichshain in Berlin.

In 1924, Bermann met Brigitte (known as “Tutti”, 1905–1991), the elder daughter of the publisher Samuel Fischer. The couple married in February 1926 and had three daughters: Gabrielle (1926–1972), Gisela (1929–2014), and Annette (1931–1996).

Samuel Fischer, at the time one of the most successful publishers of fiction, had been seeking a successor to lead his company following the early death of his son Gerhart in 1913. In October 1925, he brought Bermann into the publishing house. Three years later, Bermann became managing director. In response to the increasingly tense political situation, he founded an AG für Verlagsrechte (corporation for publishing rights) in Switzerland in 1932. He transferred newly concluded contracts with authors to this company, thereby protecting them from potential confiscation or interference by the National Socialist authorities.

In 1932, Bermann appointed Peter Suhrkamp as editor-in-chief of the Neue Rundschau; in the autumn of 1933, Suhrkamp also joined the company’s executive board. Publishing activities initially continued even after Samuel Fischer increasingly withdrew from public life and died on 15 October 1934, as the National Socialist regime at first sought to maintain an appearance of cultural liberalism abroad. Nevertheless, several available titles from the publishing house were burned during the Nazi book burnings of 1933.

In 1936, Bermann decided to divide the company. One part remained in Germany under the name S. Fischer and was transferred to a publisher acceptable to the Reich Ministry of Public Enlightenment and Propaganda. This branch, intended for “uncontroversial” authors, was to be led by Peter Suhrkamp. The other part, comprising works by critical writers, was moved to Vienna and continued as the Bermann-Fischer Verlag in the legal form of a GmbH. The plan was approved by the authorities, and in March 1936 Bermann emigrated to Austria with his wife and three daughters. From Vienna, he succeeded in republishing and maintaining the works of authors such as Thomas Mann, Hugo von Hofmannsthal, Hermann Hesse, Mechtilde Lichnowsky, and Carl Zuckmayer.

After his emigration to Vienna, later in 1936 his family went to Stockholm and then to the United States. In 1942 in New York he formed the imprint of L.B. Fischer, together with Fritz Landshoff.

After the Second World War, Bermann Fischer initially continued to direct the publishing house from Stockholm. From 1948, together with Fritz H. Landshoff, head of the German-language division of the Querido Verlag (1933–1940), he operated as Bermann Fischer/Querido Verlag from Amsterdam; Vienna also continued to be listed as a place of publication. In 1950, a final separation took place from Peter Suhrkamp, who had, as planned, led the German-based part of the publishing house through the Nazi period. Authors were then free to choose whether to remain with Bermann Fischer or join Suhrkamp.

Bermann Fischer retired in 1963 after selling the publishing house in 1962 to the Holtzbrinck Publishing Group. He subsequently devoted his time to sculpture and, later, to painting. In his final interview, he stated that his life’s work had been guided by two obligations: to preserve the publishing house and continue it in accordance with its tradition, and to protect his family from destruction under Nazi rule.

Bermann Fischer died in 1995 in Tuscany and was buried at the Jewish Cemetery Berlin-Weißensee.

== Literary works ==
- Wanderer durch ein Jahrhundert. Fischer (Tb.), Frankfurt 1994, ISBN 3-596-12176-0
- Bedroht, bewahrt. Fischer (S.), Frankfurt 1981, ISBN 3-10-021601-6
- Briefwechsel mit Autoren. Fischer (S.), Frankfurt 2001, ISBN 3-10-021602-4
- Lebendige Gegenwart. ²1987, ISBN 3-7172-0348-7
- Briefwechsel. [with Carl Zuckmayer], Wallstein 2004, ISBN 3-89244-627-X
- Briefwechsel 1932 - 1955. [with Thomas Mann], Fischer (Tb.), Frankfurt 1975, ISBN 3-596-21566-8
- Die neue Rundschau vom 6. Juni 1945. Faksimileausgabe, S. Fischer, Frankfurt 2001, ISBN 3-10-048184-4 (Hg.)
