= Peter Schneider (writer) =

German writer (1940–2026)

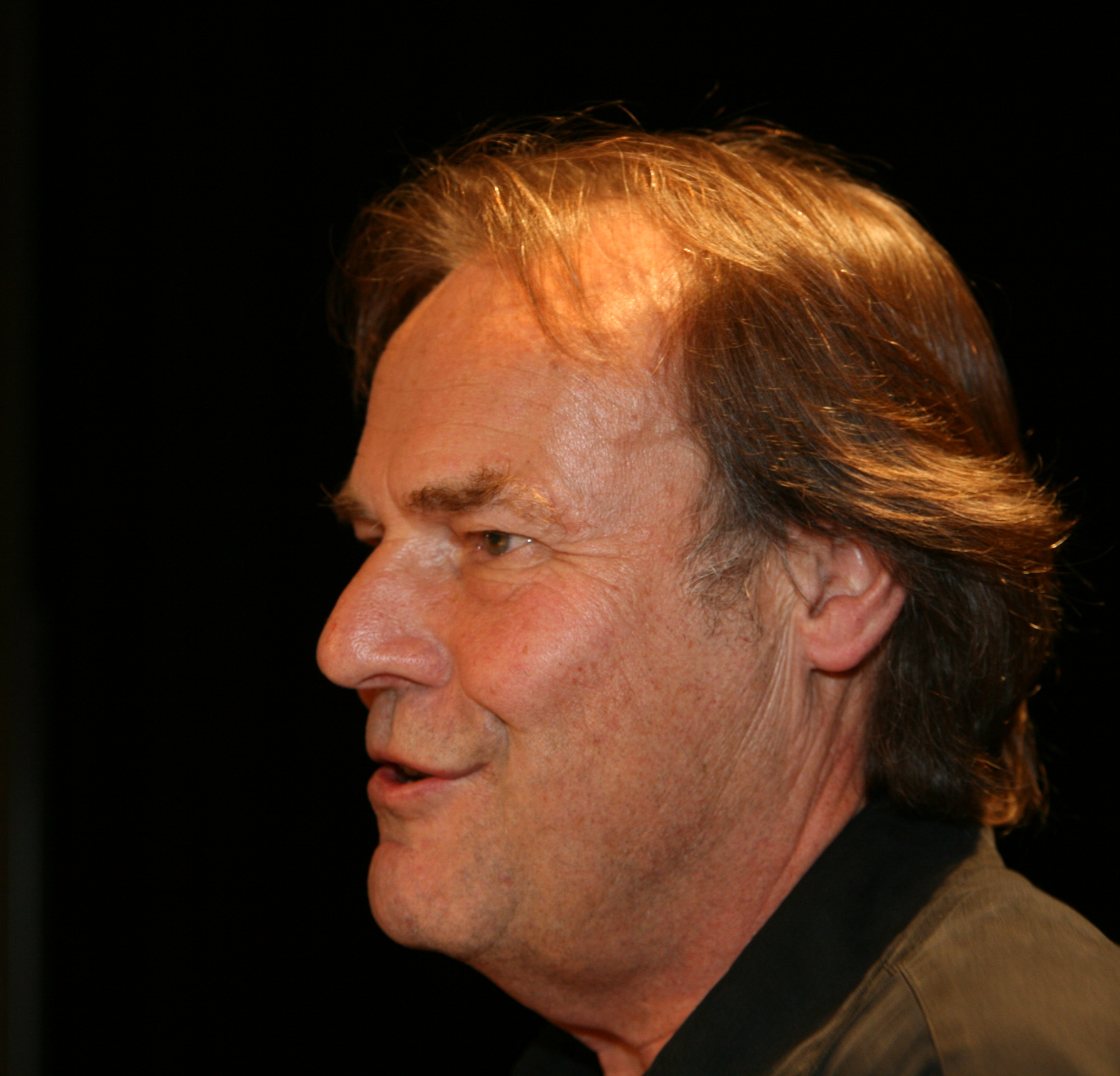
Schneider in 2008

Peter Schneider (21 April 1940 – 3 March 2026) was a German writer.

== Life and career ==
Schneider was born in Lübeck on 21 April 1940, the son of a conductor and composer. He spent his early childhood in Königsberg and Saxony; from 1945 to 1950 he lived in Grainau near Garmisch-Partenkirchen, and from 1950 in Freiburg im Breisgau. After gaining his Abitur in 1959, he studied German, history, and philosophy at the University of Freiburg and LMU Munich. In 1962, he continued his studies at the Free University of Berlin. In the federal election campaign of 1965, he worked together with a number of well-known writers in the Wahlkampfkontor (electoral office) of the SPD.

During the 1960s, Schneider experienced a political radicalisation that led him to become one of the spokespersons and organisers of the West Berlin West German student movement. In 1967, he was involved in the preparation of the so-called "Springer-Tribunal". He was a member of a group aiming to found a proletarian political party and rouse the working class. For this reason, Schneider worked temporarily as an unskilled worker in one of the Bosch factories. Later, he taught in a private school and did freelance work in broadcasting. In 1972, he received his degree, but in 1973 the education authorities in West Berlin refused to appoint him as a trainee teacher on account of his political activity. That decision was overturned by a court in West Berlin in 1976.

Having in the meantime established himself as a writer, Schneider gave up the idea of teaching. His novel Lenz, published in 1973, had become a cult text for the German left, capturing the feelings of those disappointed by the failure of their utopian revolt. Thereafter, Schneider wrote novels, short stories, and film scripts that often dealt with the fate of members of his generation. Other works dealt with the situation of Berlin before and after German reunification. Schneider was also a major essayist.

Schneider frequently held posts as visiting professor or writer in residence at universities in the United States, including Stanford University, Harvard University, and Princeton University. From 2001, he was the Roth Distinguished Writer-in-Residence at Georgetown University. He lived in Berlin.

He was a member of the German PEN Club. He was a recipient of a Villa Massimo scholarship (1979) and the Förderpreis für Literatur des Kulturkreises of the Bundesverband der Deutschen Industrie (1983). In 2014, he was awarded the 10-week London scholarship from the German Literature Fund, as Writer-in-Residence at Queen Mary University of London (spring 2016).

Schneider died of kidney cancer in Berlin, on 3 March 2026, at the age of 85.

== Works in English ==
- The Wall Jumper, New York 1984
- The German Comedy, New York 1990
- Couplings, New York 1996
- Eduard's Homecoming, New York 2000
- Berlin Now, Farrar, Straus and Giroux 2014

== Secondary literature ==
- Alois Prinz: Der poetische Mensch im Schatten der Utopie, Würzburg 1990
- Colin Riordan (ed.): Peter Schneider, Cardiff 1995
- Markus Meik: Peter Schneiders Erzählung "Lenz", Siegen 1997
- Elizabeth Snyder Hook: Family secrets and the contemporary German novel, Rochester, NY [u. a.] 2001
- Gundula M. Sharman: Twentieth century reworkings of German literature, Rochester, NY [u. a.] 2002

== Filmography ==
- The Man on the Wall, directed by Reinhard Hauff (1982, based on Der Mauerspringer)
- Rua Alguem 5555: My Father, directed by Egidio Eronico (2003, based on Vati)

Screenwriter

- Abgründe (Anthology film, segment: Robert, dir. Peter Lilienthal, 1967, TV film)
- Knife in the Head (dir. Reinhard Hauff, 1978)
- Pestalozzi's Mountain (dir. Peter von Gunten, 1989)
- The Promise (dir. Margarethe von Trotta, 1995)
