= Jonathan Landgrebe =

German publisher (born 1977)

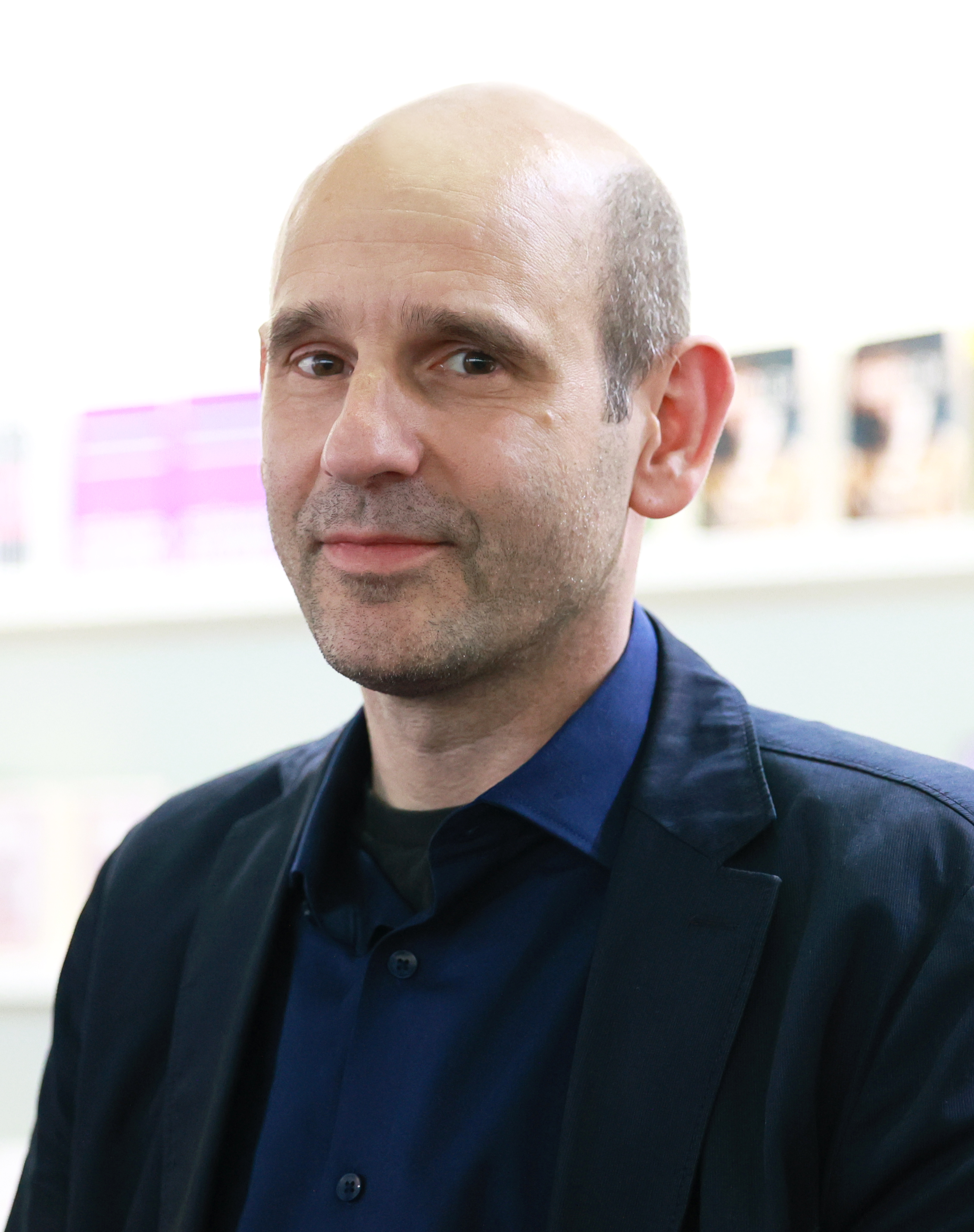
Jonathan Landgrebe at Frankfurt Book Fair 2023

Jonathan Landgrebe (born 21 June 1977 in Hamburg) is a German economist and publisher and leads Suhrkamp Verlag in Berlin.

He studied in Göttingen, Lyon, Berkeley and Munich and received a doctorate in economics. He is married and father of two children. He started working for Suhrkamp in 2007 and was made board member 2008. In 2015, he took over the chair of the Suhrkamp AG and the post as director of the publishing house. His predecessor Ulla Unseld-Berkéwicz moves from a directing position to chairing the Suhrkamp supervisory board.
