= Knife in the Head =

1978 film

- Film poster
- Directed by: Reinhard Hauff
- Written by: Reinhard Hauff; Peter Schneider
- Produced by: Wolf-Dietrich Brücker; Eberhard Junkersdorf
- Starring: Bruno Ganz
- Cinematography: Frank Brühne
- Edited by: Peter Przygodda
- Music by: Irmin Schmidt
- Release date: 1978
- Running time: 108 minutes
- Country: West Germany
- Language: German

Knife in the Head (German: Messer im Kopf) is a 1978 West German drama film directed by Reinhard Hauff and starring Bruno Ganz. The film follows the recovery of a man shot in the head by the police during the raid of a left-wing social centre. It won awards in Paris and Berlin.

Irmin Schmidt composed the entirety of the film's soundtrack, aided by Alex Wiska who played bağlama.

== Plot ==
Knife in the Head begins with a police raid on a left-wing social centre in which Berthold Hoffmann is seriously injured. His wife Ann Hoffmann and her friend Volker visit him in hospital and discover that he is brain damaged. The doctors say he needs time to recover, but the police are eager to interview him. The film then becomes a chart of his slow recovery of what happened during the raid. For his supporters it is clear that Hoffmann was shot by a police officer and that the state is repressive, whilst the police led by Anleitner seek to prove a conspiracy led by Hoffmann.

== Cast ==
- Bruno Ganz as Berthold Hoffmann
- Angela Winkler as Ann Hoffmann
- Hans Christian Blech as Anleitner
- Heinz Hoenig as Volker
- Hans Brenner as Scholz
- Udo Samel as Schurig
- Eike Gallwitz as Dr. Groeske
- Carla Egerer as Schwester Angelika
- Gabriele Dossi as Schwester Emilie
- Hans Fuchs as Chefarzt
- Gert Burkard as Institutsdirektor
- Erich Kleiber as Pförtner

== Critical response ==
The film was released in 1978. Roger Ebert gave it three stars, saying it "isn't a straightforward leftist political tract; it's much more subtle than that". A neurologist opined that "Bruno Ganz’s extraordinary portrayal of Berthold Hoffman’s neurological condition is arguably the most realistic enactment of a brain injury ever depicted in the cinema". Writing in The New York Times, Vincent Canby called the ending "both a shock and thoroughly satisfying". The film was nominated for Best Foreign Language Film of the year by the U.S. National Board of Review. Reinhard Hauff won award at festivals in Berlin and Paris for the film.
