= Man Under Suspicion =

1984 German political thriller film

- Directed by: Norbert Kückelmann
- Written by: Norbert Kückelmann; Dagmar Kekulé; Thomas Petz
- Produced by: Norbert Kückelmann
- Starring: Maximilian Schell
- Cinematography: Jürgen Jürges
- Edited by: Siegrun Jäger
- Release date: 6 April 1984
- Running time: 126 minutes
- Country: West Germany
- Language: German

Man Under Suspicion (German: Morgen in Alabama) is a 1984 West German film directed by Norbert Kückelmann.

== Cast ==
- Maximilian Schell as Lawyer Landau
- Lena Stolze as Jessica Kranz
- Robert Aldini as Werner Kranz
- Wolfgang Kieling as Reporter 'Watergate'
- Kathrin Ackermann as Judge
- Manfred Rendl as Public Prosecutor
- Reinhard Hauff as Holm
- Jörg Hube as Commissioner Sommer
- Klaus Höhne as Presiding Magistrate
- Robert Atzorn as Attorney-General
- Patricia Kückelmann as Kathrin Landau
- Markus Urchs as Dropout
- Despina Avramidou as Greek Woman
- Elisabeth Bertram as Grandmother
- Florian Furtwängler as Zurek

== Awards and nominations ==
The film was chosen as West Germany's official submission to the 57th Academy Awards for Best Foreign Language Film, but did not manage to receive a nomination. It was also entered into the 34th Berlin International Film Festival, where it won the Silver Bear.
