= The Experts (1973 film) =

1973 film

- Directed by: Norbert Kückelmann
- Written by: Norbert Kückelmann
- Starring: Mathias Eysen
- Cinematography: Alfred Tichawsky
- Release date: 7 September 1973
- Running time: 98 minutes
- Country: West Germany
- Language: German

The Experts (German: Die Sachverständigen) is a 1973 West German drama film directed by Norbert Kückelmann. It was entered into the 23rd Berlin International Film Festival where it won the Silver Bear award.

== Cast ==
- Mathias Eysen as Matthias Mainzer
- Eckhard Langmann as Amtsarzt
- Wolfgang Ebert as Gutachter
- Ernst Battenberg as Anstaltsdirektor
- Gisela Fischer
- Roland Wiegenstein
- Miriam Mahler
- Hans Brenner
- Alfred Edel (as Alo Edel)
- Anna Czaschke
- Walter Sedlmayr
