= Rua Alguem 5555: My Father =

2003 film directed by Egidio Eronico

- Directed by: Egidio Eronico
- Screenplay by: Egidio Eronico; Antonella Grassi
- Based on: Vati by Peter Schneider
- Produced by: Roberto Buttafarro; Gherardo Pagliei; Marco Quintili; Elisabetta Riga
- Starring: Thomas Kretschmann; Charlton Heston; F. Murray Abraham
- Cinematography: János Kende
- Edited by: Raimondo Aiello
- Music by: Riccardo Giagni
- Production companies: Gam Film S.r.l. Total Entertainment; Focus Film Filmproduction & Distribution
- Distributed by: A.B. Film
- Release date: September 2003 (Festival of Rio)
- Running time: 100 minutes
- Countries: Italy; Brazil; Hungary
- Languages: English; German; Hungarian; Portuguese

Rua Alguem 5555: My Father is a 2003 Italian-Brazilian-Hungarian drama film directed by Egidio Eronico and starring Thomas Kretschmann, Charlton Heston in his final film appearance and F. Murray Abraham. It is based on the novel Vati by Peter Schneider.

== Cast ==
- Thomas Kretschmann as Hermann M.
- Charlton Heston as The Father (Josef Mengele)
- F. Murray Abraham as Paul Minsky
- Thomas Heinze as Robert S.
- Camilo Beviláqua as Jens Keitel
- Odilon Wagner as Wolfgang Weinert
- Denise Weinberg as Magdalena Weinert
- Petra Maria Reinhardt as Young Hermann's Mother
- Marit Nissen as Young Aunt Lotte

== Production ==
Filming occurred in Rio de Janeiro in October 2001.
