= Julia Kissina =

German and Russian artist (born 1966)

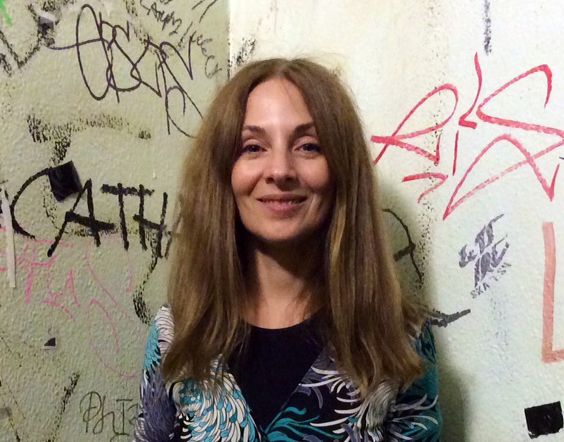
- 2014
- Born: 1966 (age 59–60)
- Education: Gerasimov Institute of Cinematography, Academy of Fine Arts in Munich
- Occupation: Writer
- Writing career
- Literary movement: Moscow Conceptualists
- Website: www.juliakissina.com

Julia Kissina (born 1966) is a German and Russian artist and writer. She was born in Kyiv.

== Early life and education ==
Kissina was born in 1966 in Kyiv, Ukraine, to a Jewish family, and studied dramatic writing at the Gerasimov Institute of Cinematography (VGIK). A political refugee, she immigrated to Germany in 1990, where she later graduated from the Academy of Fine Arts in Munich.

== Life and work ==
"Influenced by the Moscow Conceptualists of the 1980s, as well as the avant-gardes of the literary underground in Russia at the time", Kissina has been a regular contributor to two of Russia's Samizdat literature journals, Obscuri Viri and Mitin Journal. Her début short novel was Of the Dove's Flight Over the Mud of Phobia (1992). Kissina's poetry and prose subsequently appeared in journals and anthologies, including the anthology of modern Russian literature, Russian Flowers of Evil (1997). Her first collection of stories in German Vergiss Tarantino (tr: Forget Tarantino) was published in 2005, the same year as her children's book Milin und der Zauberstift (tr: Milin and the Magic Pencil).

Her style, characterized by whimsical humor, precise observations of social conflicts and a distinct sense of the absurd, can be described as auto-fictional fabulism. An essential theme of her work is "civilization and its discontents". Despite intertextual experiments with words and subjects, her books are intricately plotted.

Her novel Frühling auf dem Mond (2013, tr: Springtime on the Moon) draws from her childhood in the 1970s Kyiv, exploring the tragic dynamic between surreal perception and bureaucratic despotism. Written in a similar style, her novel Elephantinas Moskauer Jahre (2016, tr: Elephantina's Moscow Years) is a coming-of-age story about a young woman who moves to Moscow to explore the depths of the artistic underground in search of true poetry.

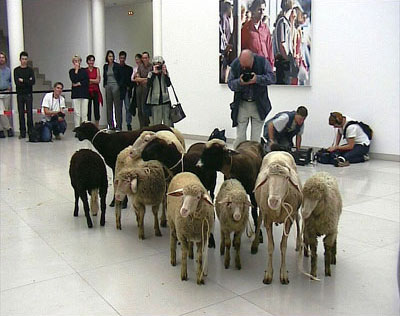
Museum of Modern Art in Frankfurt Frankfurt 2000

Kissina is also a visual artist who made conceptual photography in the 1990s. In 2000, she herded an actual flock of sheep into the Museum of Modern Art in Frankfurt as part of a performance. She also co-curated the Art & Crime Festival at the Hebbel Theater, Berlin, in 2003 and performed in a German prison. In 2006 she created The Dead Artist's Society, which held séances to conduct "Dialogues with Classics" such as Duchamp and Malevich.

== Publications ==
- The Devil's Childhood, novel, Obscuri viri, Moscow, 1993
- The Dove's Flight Over the Mud of Phobia, novel, Obscuri viri, Moscow, 1997
- Simple Desires, Alethea, St. Petersburg, 2001 (Nominated for the Andrei Bely Prize)
- Forget Tarantino, Aufbau, Berlin, 2005;
- The Smile of the Ax, Colonna, St. Petersburg/Prague, 2007
- Milin and the Magic Pencil, children's book, Bloomsbury/Berlin, 2005
- Springtime on the Moon, novel, Azbuka, St. Petersburg, 2012; German. Suhrkamp, Berlin, 2013; Fabula, Ukraine, 2016
- Elephantinas Moscow Years, novel, Suhrkamp, Berlin, 2016; Zvezda, St. Petersburg, 2015; Fabula, Ukraine, 2017

=== Art books ===
- Dead Artists Society, Verlag für moderne Kunst, Nuremberg, 2010
- When Shadows Cast People, Peperoni, Berlin, 2010
- Dead Artists Society, The Library of Moscow Conceptualism, Russia, 2011

=== Anthologies and collections ===
- Russian flowers of the evil, ed. Viktor Yerofeev, Eksmo, Moscow,1997
- Les fleurs du mal, A. Michel, Paris, 1997
- I fiori del male russi, Voland, Rome, 2001
- A Thousand Poets, One Language, A Mohammed bin Rashid al Maktoum Foundation, Dubai, 2009
- Ruské kvety zla, Belimex, Slovakia, 2001
- Contemporary Russian Prose, ed. Vladimir Sorokin, Zakharov, Moscow, 2003
- Il casualitico (Fernando Pessoa, Amélie Nothomb, Valentino Zaichen, Renzo Paris, Franco Purini, Kissina), Voland, Rome, 2003
- 21 new storytellers DTV, Munich, 2003
- Tema lesarva, Gabo, Budapest, 2005
- Cuentos rusos, Siruela, Madrid, 2006

=== Editor and curator ===
- Revolution Noir: Autoren der russischen "neuen Welle". German. Suhrkamp, Berlin, 2017. ISBN 978-3-518-42766-8. An anthology of contemporary Russian avant-garde literature including the work of Vladimir Sorokin, Pavel Pepperstein, Youlia Belomlinskaja and others, translated into German.
- In Riga. A Memoir. By Boris Lurie. Edited and introduced by Kissina. Printed in the USA. ISBN 978-0-578-51209-9.
- Berlin / New York = Urban Dictionary literature festival, Summer, 2018; curator. Urban Dictionary brought together writers and poets from Berlin and New York.
