= Norbert Kückelmann =

German film director, screenwriter and lawyer

- Born: 1 May 1930; Munich, Germany
- Died: 31 August 2017 (aged 87)
- Occupations: Film director Screenwriter
- Years active: 1960 - 2002

Norbert Kückelmann (1 May 1930 – 31 August 2017) was a German film director, screenwriter and lawyer. He was born in Munich, During the 1950s he studied law and worked part-time as a film critic. After graduation, he worked as a lawyer in Munich and Mainz. In 1965 he founded together with Alexander Kluge and Hans-Rolf Strobel the Young German Film Committee (German: Kuratorium Junger Deutscher Film. Continuing to work as a lawyer he directed his first film Die Sachverständigen in 1973. At the 23rd Berlin International Film Festival the film won a Silver Bear. His first film also won the Deutscher Filmpreis - Best Feature Film. At the 34th Berlin International Film Festival, his film Man Under Suspicion also won a Silver Bear. Two years later, he was a member of the jury at the 36th Berlin International Film Festival.

Norbert Kückelmann was the brother of the actress Gertrud Kückelmann.

== Filmography ==
- The Experts (Die Sachverständigen) - 1973
- Fear Is a Second Shadow (Die Angst ist ein zweiter Schatten) - 1974
- The Last Years of Childhood - 1979
- Man Under Suspicion (Morgen in Alabama) - 1984
- C*A*S*H: A Political Fairy Tale - 1989
- Abgetrieben - 1992
- Alle haben geschwiegen - 1996
- Porträt eines Richters - 1997
- Verlorene Kinder - 2000
- Ich hab es nicht gewollt - Anatomie eines Mordfalls - 2002
