= S. Fischer Verlag =

German publishing house

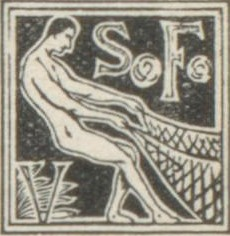
- Company type: Division
- Industry: Publishing
- Founded: 1881; 144 years ago in Berlin
- Founder: Samuel von Fischer
- Headquarters: Frankfurt am Main, Germany
- Parent: Holtzbrinck Publishing Group (since 1962)
- Website: fischerverlage.de

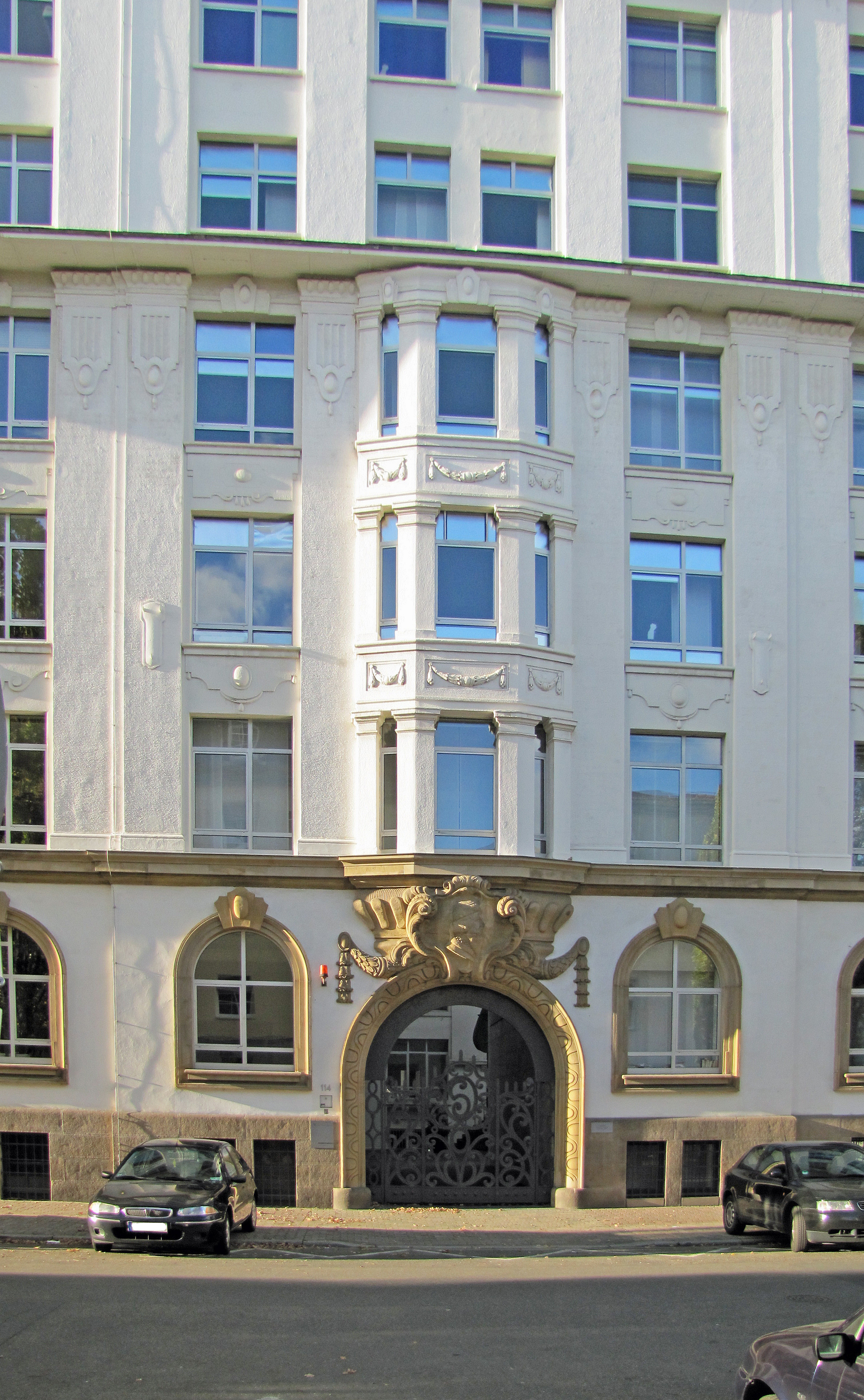
S. Fischer premises in 2010.

S. Fischer Verlag is a major German publishing house, which has operated as a division of Holtzbrinck Publishing Group since 1962. The publishing house was founded in 1881 by Samuel Fischer in Berlin, but is currently based in Frankfurt am Main, and is traditionally counted among the most prestigious publishing houses in the German-speaking world.

== History ==
Originally, it was renowned for naturalistic literature. Famous authors include Gerhart Hauptmann and Thomas Mann, both awarded the Nobel Prize in Literature.

After the Nazis came to power in Germany, the Jewish family of owner Gottfried Bermann-Fischer fled and founded a branch of their publishing house in Vienna. Those who remained in Berlin kept the official name "S. Fischer Verlag" and were led by Peter Suhrkamp.

After the Second World War, disputes over the future of the publishing house arose between Suhrkamp and Fischer. This led to an out-of-court agreement, resulting in a sort of bisection of the S. Fischer Verlag: Bermann-Fischer regained control from Peter Suhrkamp, but Suhrkamp founded his own Suhrkamp publishing house in 1950, and authors could choose which publishing house they wanted to be published by in future. Ultimately, 33 of the 48 authors, among them Bertolt Brecht, Hermann Hesse, T. S. Eliot and George Bernard Shaw, decided to change to Suhrkamp.

Among the imprints of Fischer are Fischer Taschenbuch Verlag, Argon Verlag and Scherz Verlag. Today the S. Fischer Verlag, as well as other publishers, such as Kindler, Rowohlt, and Kiepenheuer & Witsch and Metzler, are part of Holtzbrinck, a publishing group. Holtzbrinck bought S. Fischer in 1963.

In 2010, O. W. Barth Verlag, which had been part of Scherz Verlag, was acquired by Droemer Knaur, which is also part of the Holtzbrinck Group.

Edition Peters — a prominent publisher for worldwide music — was located next door to them, but in 2014 moved to Leipzig.

== Controversies ==
In 2015, S. Fischer Verlag sued US-based Project Gutenberg in German court for copyright infringement of 18 works by Heinrich Mann, Thomas Mann and Alfred Döblin, works in the public domain in the US, but still copyrighted under German law. In February 2018 Project Gutenberg responded to the German court's judgement by blocking all access to Project Gutenberg from IP addresses in Germany, making the full content of Project Gutenberg inaccessible for German residents.
