= Peter Suhrkamp =

German publisher

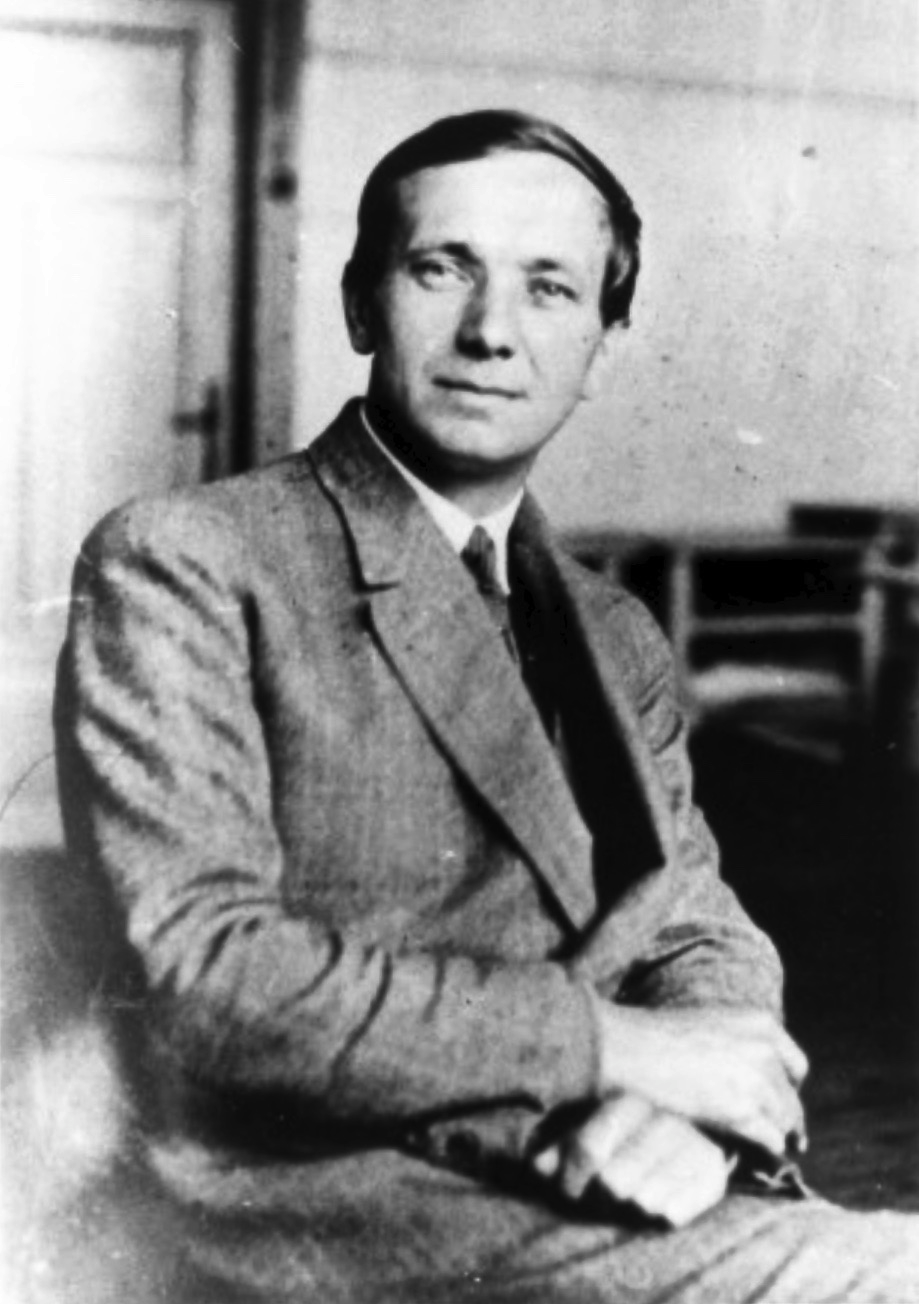
Peter Suhrkamp, 1922

Peter Suhrkamp (full name Johann Heinrich Suhrkamp; 28 March 1891, Hatten – 31 March 1959, Frankfurt) was a German publisher and founder of the Suhrkamp Verlag.

== Early years ==
Suhrkamp was a farmer's son from Kirchhatten, some ten miles (16 km) south-east of Oldenburg.

The house where he was born is still standing: in the town hall at Kirchhatten there is a bust of him by Johannes Cernota (2012) as well as a portrait, while a few of his works are exhibited at the local library.

As a young man Suhrkamp was a candidate for the priesthood at the Evangelical seminary in Oldenburg. Like many of his generation, in 1914 he volunteered for the army where he would serve as an infantryman and as a Battalion Patrol Leader. For his contribution as an Assault Troop leader he won the Knight's Cross of the Royal Order of Hohenzollern, awarded "with swords, for particular bravery". Nevertheless, his experiences on the frontline led him to a nervous breakdown. After the war he studied Literature and linguistics at, successively, Heidelberg, Frankfurt and Munich. During his studies he also worked as a teacher at the Odenwald School, a private boarding school in Heppenheim and at the prestigious Wickersdorf Free School Community.

From 1921 to 1925 Suhrkamp worked as dramatic adviser and director at the Landestheater Darmstadt. Between 1925 and 1929 he returned to teaching at the Wickersdorf Free School Community where he had earlier worked while a student. He finally gave up teaching in 1929 and relocated to Berlin where he worked as a freelancer with the Berliner Tageblatt (BT), a leading liberal newspaper of the time, also working on the monthly magazine "Uhu" which was produced by the same publisher as the BT. During this time he was married three times: to Ida Plöger, a teacher, from 1913–1918, to Irmgard Caroline Lehmann from 1919 to 1923 and, more briefly, in 1923/24 to the opera singer, Fanny Cleve.

== The publisher ==
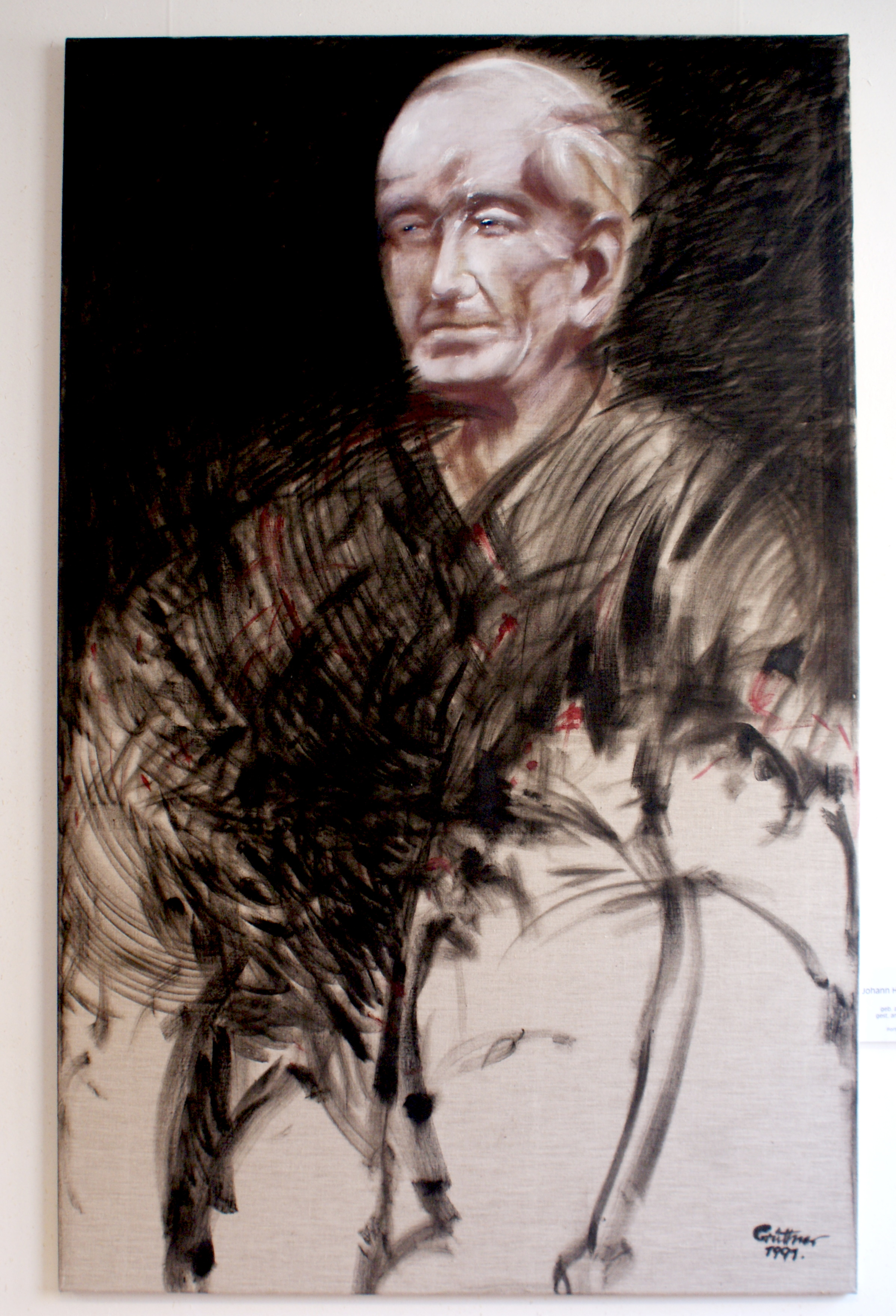
Painting of Suhrkamp

In 1932 he joined the S. Fischer Verlag (a well established publishing house), initially as editor of the Neue Rundschau, a literary magazine. In 1933 he joined the company's board. In 1935 he married Annemarie Seidel, who had started a career as an actress but been obliged to retire on health grounds. A year later the S. Fischer Verlag company was split when Gottfried Bermann Fischer moved (initially) to Vienna, taking part of the business with him. Part of the business had to remain in Germany, being purchased by Peter Suhrkamp, who would continue to lead it till he was accused of high treason and arrested by the Gestapo in April 1944. The legal process continued till early in 1945, when he was placed in "protective custody" (a euphemism then much in vogue in Germany) in the concentration camp at Sachsenhausen-Oranienburg. Two weeks later, suffering from a serious lung disease, he was released. Several celebrities from the world of culture and the arts had approached members of the Führer's inner circle, to urge Suhrkamp's release. These included the sculptor Arno Breker, who had intervened with Albert Speer, the writer Gerhart Hauptmann, who had invoked support from Baldur von Schirach, and the writer Hans Carossa, who had approached Ernst Kaltenbrunner.

After the German surrender, on 8 October 1945 Suhrkamp received the first publishing license from the British Military Government in Berlin and began rebuilding the company. He cooperated with Bermann Fischer (who had operated as a publisher during the war in New York City), publishing some of his authors, under licence, in Germany. Suhrkamp and Fischer discussed a reintegration of the two businesses that had split when the political situation had obliged Fisher to leave Germany back in 1936. There was talk of refounding S. Fischer Verlag in Frankfurt am Main. In due course Fischer was re-established in Frankfurt, but there was a rift between Fischer and Suhrkamp over the future of the business. Following an out-of-court settlement, it was Bermann Fischer who recovered the Frankfurt publishing business that carried his name and Peter Suhrkamp who left to establish, in 1950, his own publishing house, Suhrkamp Verlag.

== Suhrkamp Verlag ==
The creation of the "new" Suhrkamp Verlag owed much to the initiative of Hermann Hesse who provided encouragement and moral support, and was also able to provide valuable contacts with investors, notably the Swiss Reinhart family. Authors who had remained with Fischer Verlag during the Nazi years were given a free choice as to whether to stay with the existing business, now under Bermann Fischer, or have their future works published by Peter Suhrkamp's new concern. In the end, 33 of the 48 authors in question, including Bertolt Brecht and Hermann Hesse, switched to Suhrkamp Verlag. Suhrkamp's fourth marriage was lasting better than the first three, and his wife Annemarie Seidel also joined the firm, working as an editor and translator.

Public recognition followed the commercial success of Suhrkamp Verlag, and in 1956 Suhrkamp received the Goethe Plaque of the City of Frankfurt. Honorary membership of the German Academy for Language and Literature (itself still less than ten years old) followed in 1957.

== Island retreat in the north ==
Suhrkamp was an enthusiastic visitor to the Island of Sylt where his wife had retained a villa following the ending of her marriage to the wealthy (Dutch by origin) musicologist Anthony van Hoboken. (Annemairie remained on friendly terms with her first husband.) The villa had been constructed in 1929 directly on the Wadden Sea. In the years immediately following the war the Suhrkamps entertained eminent guests here, such as Max Frisch. However, in 1953 the holiday villa was sold to the energetic newspaper magnate Axel Springer and his wife for 45,000 Marks: Surhkamp invested his windfall in the German language publishing rights for Marcel Proust's works.

== Achievements ==
Authors published by Suhkamp included Theodor W. Adorno, Samuel Beckett, Bertolt Brecht, T. S. Eliot, Max Frisch, Ernst Penzoldt, Rudolf Alexander Schröder, Martin Walser and Carl Zuckmayer. A small insight into his personal relationships with "his" authors comes in his volume Briefe an die Autoren ("Letters to the authors") Suhrkamp also tried his hand at authorship and at translation. His Bibliothek Suhrkamp (Suhrkamp Library) series was the first such series to feature works of twentieth century literature that combined literary merit with the new scientific spirit of the age. The "Suhrkamp culture" was vigorously underwritten by Siegfried Unseld who joined as the publisher's senior editor in 1951 and, after Suhrkamp died in 1959, succeeded him as publisher in chief and sole owner of the business.

== Death ==
Peter Suhrkamp died in Frankfurt's University Clinic. He was cremated and his ashes were conserved in a suitable container on the Island of Sylt, at the church of St. Severin in Keitum. Suhrkamp had mandated in his hand-written will that his ashes were to be scattered in the North Sea from the coast of Sylt, but it turned out that this was against the rules. The placing of the urn containing his ashes in an aperture in the wall of the church cemetery was organised by Siegfried Unseld. Peter Suhrkamp died one or two days before his divorce from Annemarie was scheduled to take place. The marriage had been affected by Annemarie's alcoholism in its final years and the divorce had been agreed upon between the parties by the time of Peter Suhrkamp's death. Peter Suhrkamp predeceased his 91-year-old mother, but only by fourteen days. Their mother-son relationship has been described as an "ambivalent non-relationship" ("ambivalente Nicht-Beziehung").

== Reading list (in German) ==
- Gottfried Bermann Fischer: "Bedroht – Bewahrt. Weg eines Verlegers", S. Fischer Verlag, Frankfurt am Main 1967. Neuauflage 1994. ISBN 3-596-21169-7
- Siegfried Unseld (Hrsg.): In memoriam Peter Suhrkamp. Privatdruck für die Freunde des Verlages, Suhrkamp, Frankfurt am Main o. J. (1959); darin enthalten (S. 157–163: Vorläufige Bibliographie v. Helene Ritzerfeld)
- Siegfried Unseld: Peter Suhrkamp. Zur Biographie eines Verlegers in Daten, Dokumenten und Bildern, Suhrkamp, Frankfurt am Main 2004, ISBN 3-518-45597-4
- Siegfried Unseld (Hrsg.): Hermann Hesse – Peter Suhrkamp. Briefwechsel 1945–1959, Suhrkamp, Frankfurt am Main 1969
- Wolfgang Schopf (Hrsg.): "So müßte ich ein Engel und kein Autor sein". Adorno und seine Frankfurter Verleger. Der Briefwechsel mit Peter Suhrkamp und Siegfried Unseld, Suhrkamp, Frankfurt am Main 2003, ISBN 978-3-518-58375-3
