= Samuel von Fischer =

German publisher (1859–1934)

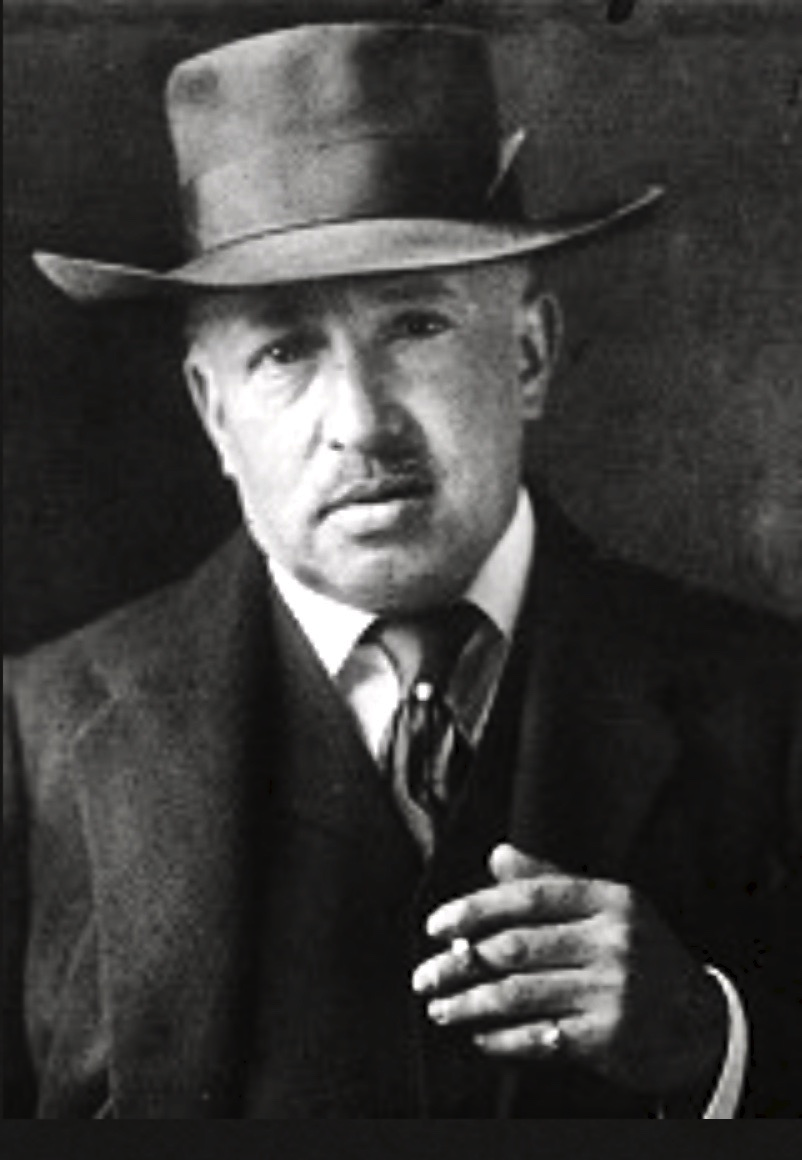
Samuel von Fischer

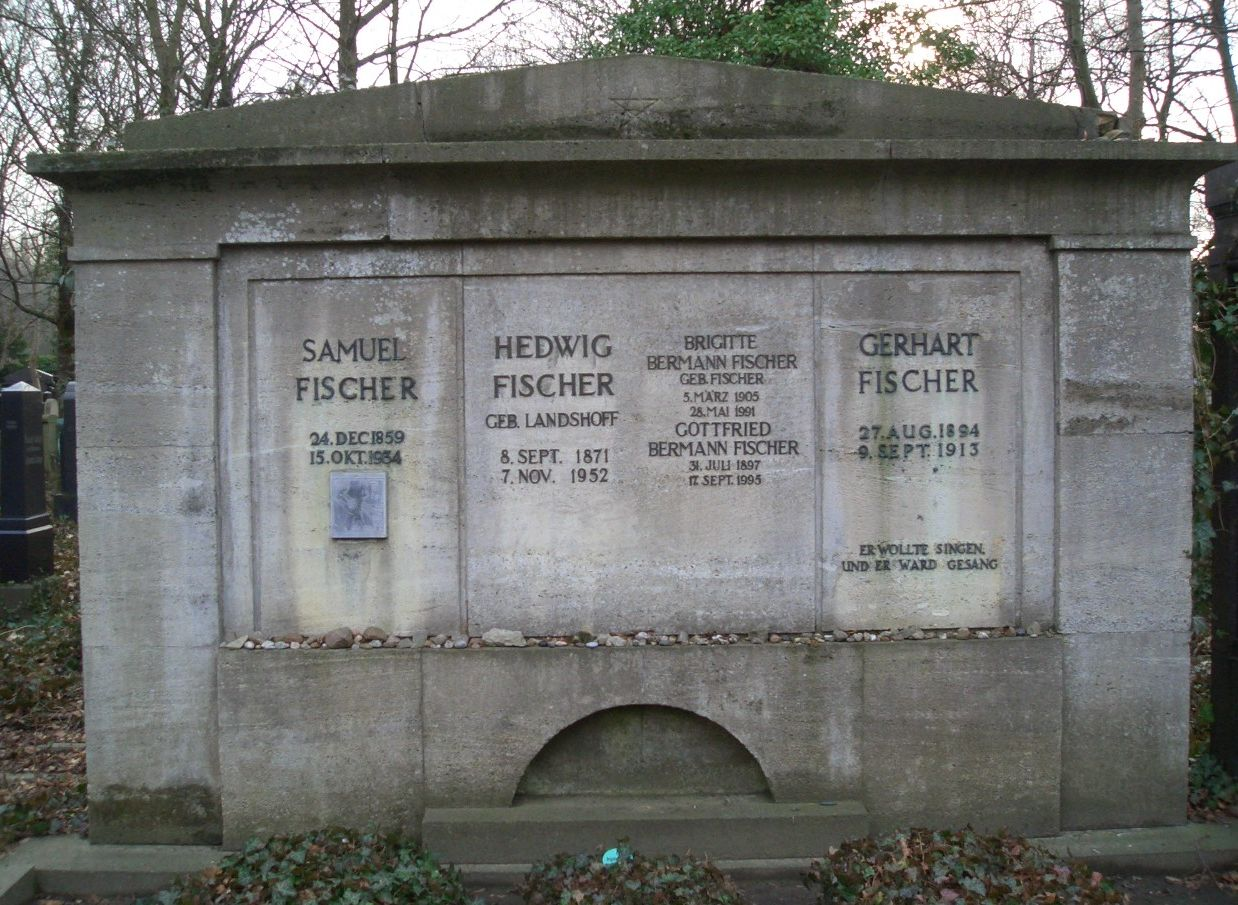
Gravesite in Weißensee Cemetery

Samuel Fischer, later Samuel von Fischer (24 December 1859 – 15 October 1934), was a Hungarian-born German publisher, the founder of S. Fischer Verlag.

== Biography ==
Fischer was born to a Jewish Hungarian family in Liptau-Sankt-Nikolaus (German) or Liptószentmiklós (Hungarian) in northern Hungary, now Liptovský Mikuláš in Slovakia. After training as a bookseller in Vienna; Fisher moved to Berlin where he joined the bookseller and publisher Hugo Steinitz. Fischer took on increasing responsibility for new publishing endeavours and launched his own firm in 1886, the S. Fischer Verlag.

The Fischer publishing house first became known by introducing the works of Ibsen to German stages and by supporting the naturalist circle in Berlin. Samuel Fischer founded the theatre society Freie Bühne with Otto Brahm to avoid censorship.

== Art collector ==
Fischer collected artworks, including Pissarro's La Quai Malaquai, Printemps, Cézanne's Still Life with Commode, Max Liebermann's Two Riders on the Beach to the left and El Greco's "Veil of Veronica".

== Nazi persecution ==
When the Nazis came to power in Germany in 1933, Fischer and his family were persecuted because of their Jewish heritage. The S. Fischer Verlag was "Aryanized", that is, transferred to non-Jews.

Fischer died in Berlin, Germany in 1934. He was survived by his wife Hedwig, and his children. His granddaughter was the actress Gisela Fischer. Restitution claims for property seized by the Nazis or lost through forced or duress sales were filed by his heirs.

== See also ==
- List of Claims for Restitution for Nazi-looted art
- Bruno Lohse
