= Nicholas Kulish =

American journalist

Nicholas Matthew Kulish
- Born: 1975 (age 50–51); Washington, D.C., United States
- Education: Columbia University
- Occupations: journalist, author
- Notable credit(s): The New York Times, The Wall Street Journal

Nicholas Matthew Kulish (born 1975) is an author and journalist who reports for The New York Times. Since March 2014, he has worked as an investigative journalist based in New York. He is the author of two books, the satirical novel Last One In and the nonfiction book The Eternal Nazi.

== Life and work ==
Born in Washington, D.C., Kulish was educated at Columbia University, graduating in 1997. He worked a series of writing and Internet jobs in Hong Kong and New York City before becoming first a news assistant, then a reporter, at The Wall Street Journal. As a correspondent in the paper's Washington bureau he covered the Florida election recount in 2000 and the September 11 attacks at the Pentagon. In 2003, he was sent to report on the invasion of Iraq for The Wall Street Journal. This influenced the writing of his first novel Last One In (2007).

Kulish joined the Times as a member of the editorial board in September 2005. There he wrote editorials about business, culture, Hurricane Katrina and the rebuilding of New Orleans.

From August 2007 to May 2013 he was the newspaper's Berlin bureau chief, covering Central and Eastern Europe. While Kulish was based in Berlin he and his colleague Souad Mekhennet uncovered the hiding place of most-wanted Nazi fugitive Aribert Heim in Cairo, where he had died in hiding in 1992. He and Mekhennet, his co-author for The Eternal Nazi (2014), were later detained by the Egyptian secret police while covering the uprising there in 2011.

In East Africa he served as foreign correspondent from June 2013 to March 2014. He covered South Sudan, the Democratic Republic of Congo and beyond.

He and other New York Times reporters did multiple in-depth articles on the Germanwings Flight 9525 plane crash, the financing of ISIS, and alleged abuses by Navy Seal Teams 2 and 6.

== Personal ==
Kulish grew up in Alexandria, Virginia and Arlington, Virginia.

He is fluent in German and was a Fulbright Scholar in Berlin.

== Bibliography ==
- Last One In. New York: Harper Perennial, 2007. ISBN 0-06-118939-1 ISBN 978-0061189395
- The Eternal Nazi: From Mauthausen to Cairo, the Relentless Pursuit of SS Doctor Aribert Heim New York: Doubleday, 2014. ISBN 978-0-385-53243-3
