= Reinhard Hauff =

German film director (born 1939)

- Born: 23 May 1939 (age 87)
- Occupations: Film director Screenwriter
- Years active: 1977-1995

Reinhard Hauff (born 23 May 1939) is a German film director. His works, which were mostly carried out in the late 1960s to early 1990s, are known for their social and political commentary. Stammheim, which is based on the activities of the Red Army Faction (commonly called the Baader-Meinhof Gang) won the Golden Bear award at the 36th Berlin International Film Festival in 1986. In 1987, he was a member of the jury at the 37th Berlin International Film Festival. His 1970 film Mathias Kneissl was entered into the 7th Moscow International Film Festival.

== Selected filmography ==
Director

- Die Revolte (1969, TV film)
- Mathias Kneissl (1970, screenplay by Martin Sperr)
- Haus am Meer (1973, TV film)
- Desaster (1973, TV film)
- Die Verrohung des Franz Blum (1974)
- Zündschnüre (1974, TV film, based on a novel by Franz Josef Degenhardt)
- Paule Pauländer (1976, TV film)
- The Main Actor (1977)
- Knife in the Head (1978, screenplay by Peter Schneider)
- Slow Attack (1980)
- The Man on the Wall (1982, based on a story by Peter Schneider)
- Ten Days in Calcutta: A Portrait of Mrinal Sen (1984, Documentary)
- Stammheim (1986, screenplay by Stefan Aust)
- Linie 1 (1988, film version of the musical Linie 1)
- Blue Eyed (1989)
- Mit den Clowns kamen die Tränen (1990, TV miniseries, based on a novel by Johannes Mario Simmel)

Actor

- The Sudden Wealth of the Poor People of Kombach (1971), as Heinrich Geiz
- The Enigma of Kaspar Hauser (1974), as a farmer
- Man Under Suspicion (1984), as Holm
