= Egenhofen =

- Municipality
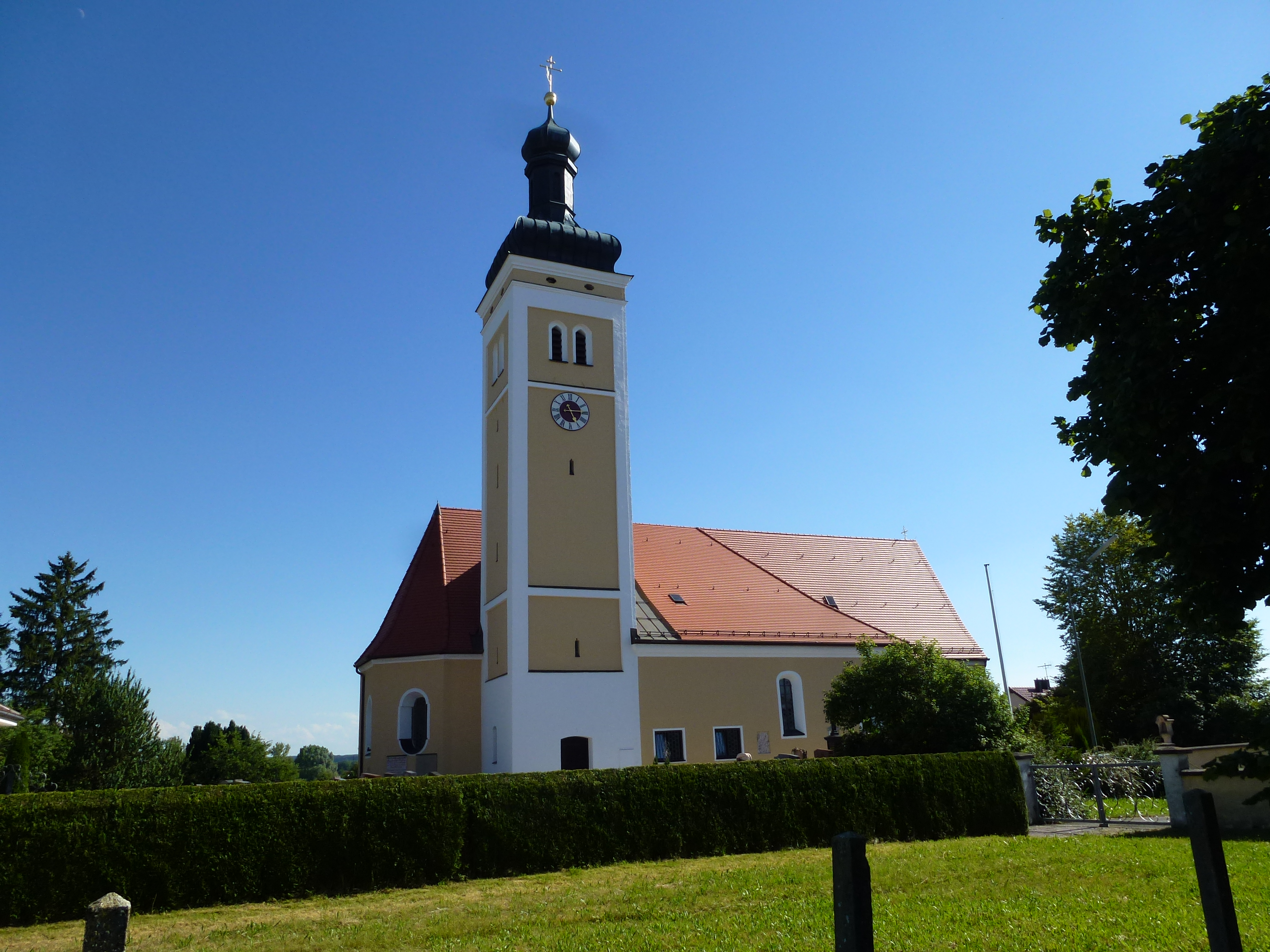
- Church of Saint Leodegar

- Coat of arms

- Location of Egenhofen within Fürstenfeldbruck district
- Interactive map of Egenhofen
- Location within Germany Location within Bavaria
- Coordinates: 48°16′N 11°10′E
- Country: Germany
- State: Bavaria
- Admin. region: Oberbayern
- District: Fürstenfeldbruck
- Subdivisions: 25 Ortsteile und Weiler

Government
  - Mayor (2020–26): Martin Obermaier

Area
  - Total: 33.4 km^{2} (12.9 sq mi)
- Elevation: 509 m (1,670 ft)

Population (2025-12-31)
  - Total: 3,446
  - Density: 103/km^{2} (267/sq mi)
- Time zone: UTC+01:00 (CET)
  - Summer (DST): UTC+02:00 (CEST)
- Postal codes: 82281, 82282
- Dialling codes: 08134
- Vehicle registration: FFB
- Website: www.egenhofen.de

Egenhofen (German pronunciation: [eːɡn̩ˈhoːfn̩]) is a municipality in the district of Fürstenfeldbruck in Bavaria in Germany.
