= Suhrkamp Verlag =

German publishing house

- Genre: Publishing house
- Founded: 1950
- Founder: Peter Suhrkamp
- Headquarters: Frankfurt (1950–2010), Berlin (2010–present), Germany
- Area served: Europe
- Products: books
- Subsidiaries: de: Insel Verlag, de:Deutscher Klassiker Verlag, de:Jüdischer Verlag, Verlag der Weltreligionen
- Website: www.suhrkamp.de

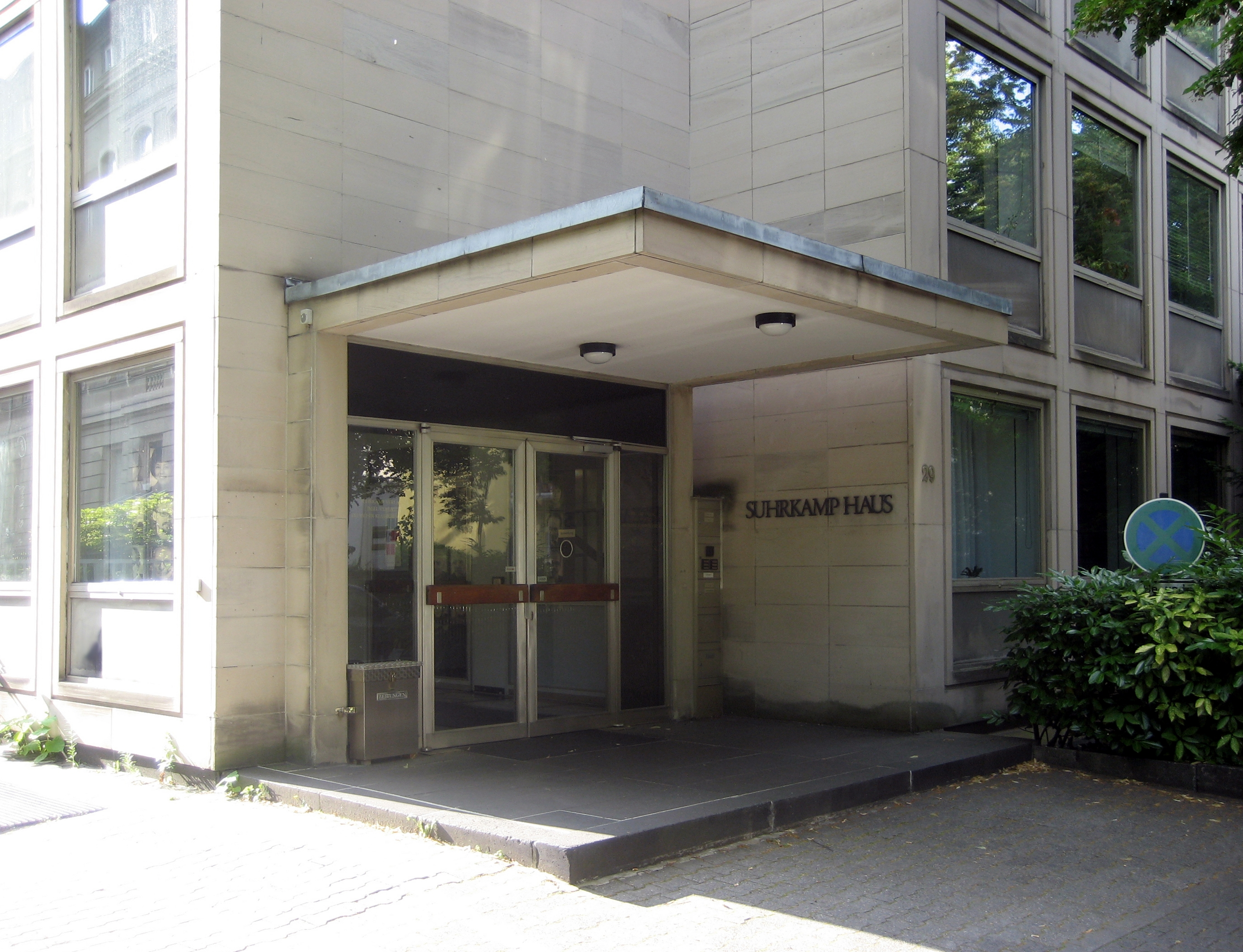
The entrance of the (now demolished) Suhrkamp-building in Frankfurt

The suhrkamp taschenbuch wissenschaft series was started in 1973 with Habermas's Erkenntnis und Interesse (Knowledge and Human Interests) (1968). The other two books pictured here are by Hegel and Otfried Höffe respectively.

Suhrkamp Verlag is a German publishing house, established in 1950 and is generally acknowledged as one of the leading European publishers of fine literature. Its roots go back to the "arianized" part of the S. Fischer Verlag. In January 2010, the headquarters of the company moved from Frankfurt to Berlin. Suhrkamp declared bankruptcy in 2013, following a longstanding legal conflict between its owners. In 2015, economist Jonathan Landgrebe was announced as director.

== Early history ==
The firm was established by Peter Suhrkamp, who had led the equally renowned S. Fischer Verlag since 1936. As the censorship of the Nazi regime endangered the existence of the S. Fischer Verlag with its many dissident authors, Gottfried Bermann Fischer in 1935 reached an agreement with the Propaganda Ministry under which the publication of the not accepted authors would leave Germany while others, the "aryanized" part, would be published under Peter Suhrkamp as managing director and, inter alia, the name "Suhrkamp" — including Nazi-oriented authors. Nevertheless, Suhrkamp was arrested by the Gestapo in 1944, but survived concentration camp imprisonment. Following a suggestion by Hermann Hesse, he left the Fischer publishing house, establishing his own in 1950. A majority of the writers associated with Fischer followed him. Among the first authors he published were Hesse, Rudolf Alexander Schröder, Hermann Kasack, T. S. Eliot, George Bernard Shaw and Bertolt Brecht.

== The Unseld period ==
Siegfried Unseld joined the firm in 1952, became part owner in 1957, and publisher on Suhrkamp's death in 1959. He led Suhrkamp Verlag until his own death in 2002.

Under Unseld's leadership, the publisher established itself within three major fields: 20th century German literature, foreign language literature and humanities. Suhrkamp books also gained acclaim for their innovative design and typography, mainly due to the work of Willy Fleckhaus.

During Unseld's reign, Suhrkamp published some of the leading modern German language authors in addition to those already mentioned.

== The post-Unseld period ==
After Unseld's death, the firm was shaken by inner strife. Today, it is led by Jonathan Landgrebe. However, some of its leading authors, such as Martin Walser, have left the publishing house.

Suhrkamp Verlag has 140 employees and an annual turnover of approximately €30 million. Until January 2010, the company headquarters were situated in Frankfurt, Germany; after that, they moved to Berlin.

== Authors writing in German ==
Jurek Becker, Jürgen Becker, Thomas Bernhard, Peter Bichsel, Bertolt Brecht, Volker Braun, Paul Celan, Tankred Dorst, Günter Eich, Hans Magnus Enzensberger, Max Frisch, Durs Grünbein, Hans Ulrich Gumbrecht, Peter Handke, Wolfgang Hildesheimer, Uwe Johnson, Thomas Kling, Wolfgang Koeppen, Karl Krolow, Andreas Maier, Friederike Mayröcker, Robert Menasse, Adolf Muschg, Paul Nizon, Hans Erich Nossack, Ernst Penzoldt, Doron Rabinovici, Nelly Sachs, Arno Schmidt, Robert Walser, Ernst Weiß, Peter Szondi, and Peter Weiss.

== Foreign authors ==
Amongst non-German writing authors are Samuel Beckett, Octavio Paz, James Joyce, Marcel Proust, José Maria de Eça de Queiroz, Clarín, Mercè Rodoreda, Jorge Semprún, Lídia Jorge, Agustina Bessa-Luís, Juan Ramón Jiménez, Amos Oz, Julia Kissina, Sylvia Plath, Eduardo Mendoza, and Clarice Lispector.

Latin American literature has become a special focus point for Suhrkamp Verlag, its catalogue includes names such as Pablo Neruda, Isabel Allende, Mario Vargas Llosa, Manuel Puig, João Ubaldo Ribeiro, Adolfo Bioy Casares, Guillermo Cabrera Infante, Alejo Carpentier, Julio Cortázar, Osman Lins, José Lezama Lima, Juan Carlos Onetti and Octavio Paz, and Tuvia Tenenbom.

== Bibliothek Suhrkamp ==
The book series Bibliothek Suhrkamp encompasses leading modern authors, including Ingeborg Bachmann, T. S. Eliot, Carlo Emilio Gadda, Federico García Lorca, André Gide, Ernest Hemingway, Yasushi Inoue, James Joyce, Franz Kafka, Vladimir Mayakovsky, Thomas Mann, Yukio Mishima, Cesare Pavese, Ezra Pound, Marcel Proust, Rainer Maria Rilke, Jean-Paul Sartre, Georg Trakl, Giuseppe Ungaretti, Paul Valéry and Marina Tsvetaeva.

== Other book series ==
Other book series published by Suhrkamp Verlag have included:

- edition suhrkamp (1963– )
- suhrkamp taschenbuch (1971– )
- suhrkamp taschenbuch wissenschaft (1973– )
- edition unseld (2008– )
- filmedition suhrkamp (2009– ).

== Academic authors ==
Social sciences and Humanities are represented by writers such as Theodor W. Adorno, Walter Benjamin, Ernst Bloch, Hans Blumenberg, Norbert Elias, Paul Feyerabend, Jürgen Habermas, Hans Jonas, Niklas Luhmann, Tilmann Moser, Gershom Scholem, Siegfried Kracauer, Helmuth Plessner, Burghart Schmidt, Georg Simmel, Viktor von Weizsäcker, Joseph Weizenbaum and Ludwig Wittgenstein. A number of Suhrkamp's publications in this field are considered standard academic reading.

== Archives ==
In 2010 "more than 2,000 boxes" of archives, described as material on the "history of ... Suhrkamp" and "the personal archive of Siegfried Unseld", were lodged with the German Literature Archive (Deutsches Literaturarchiv) in Marbach am Neckar.
