= Marquard Bohm =

German actor (1941–2006)

- Born: 27 June 1941; Hamburg, Germany
- Died: 3 February 2006 (aged 64); Wetter an der Ruhr, Germany
- Occupation: Actor
- Years active: 1966-2000

Marquard Bohm (27 June 1941 – 3 February 2006) was a German actor. He appeared in more than 100 films and television shows between 1965 and 2000. He starred in the 1982 film Eine deutsche Revolution, which was entered into the 32nd Berlin International Film Festival. His older brother was the actor and director Hark Bohm.

== Filmography ==
Year	Title	Role	Director	Notes
1967	Na und ..?		Marquard Bohm	Short
1969	The Arsonists	Dieter	Klaus Lemke	TV film
1969	Detectives	Andy Schubert	Rudolf Thome	
1969	Die Revolte	Strecke	Reinhard Hauff	TV film
1970	A Big Grey-Blue Bird	Bill	Thomas Schamoni	
1970	Red Sun	Thomas Kotowski	Rudolf Thome	
1970	The American Soldier	Private detective	Rainer Werner Fassbinder	Uncredited
1970	Deadlock	Kid	Roland Klick	
1970	Terror Desire		Marquard Bohm	Short
1971	Supergirl	Evers	Rudolf Thome	TV film
1971	Beware of a Holy Whore	Ricky	Rainer Werner Fassbinder	
1971	Love Is as Beautiful as Love	Marquard	Klaus Lemke	
1973	Zahltag		Hans Noever	
1973	Tschetan, der Indianerjunge	Alaska	Hark Bohm	
1973	Ein Weihnachtsmärchen		Bernd Eichinger	
1974	Ali: Fear Eats the Soul	Gruber	Rainer Werner Fassbinder	
1974	Ein bißchen Liebe		Veith von Fürstenberg	
1974	Karl May	Überhorst	Hans-Jürgen Syberberg	
1974	Output	Roland	Michael Fengler	
1975	Fox and His Friends	American Soldier	Rainer Werner Fassbinder	
1975	Hugs and Other Things	Bank robber	Jochen Richter	
1976	Kings of the Road	The man who lost his wife	Wim Wenders	
1976	North Sea Is Dead Sea	Uwe's father	Hark Bohm	
1976	Satan's Brew	Rolf	Rainer Werner Fassbinder	
1977	Petty Thieves	Charly	Michael Fengler	
1978	Moritz, Dear Moritz	Barbara's father	Hark Bohm	
1980	Im Herzen des Hurrican	Walter Schiedrowski	Hark Bohm	
1980	Theo Against the Rest of the World	The pilot	Peter F. Bringmann	
1980	Slow Attack	John	Reinhard Hauff	
1982	Eine deutsche Revolution	Preuninger, prison guard	Helmut Herbst	
1982	The Man on the Wall		Reinhard Hauff	
1984	Moving Targets	Berthold	Volker Vogeler	
1985	Betrogen	Lawrenz	Harun Farocki	
1987	The Little Prosecutor	Trompeter	Hark Bohm	
1987	Jacob hinter der blauen Tür	Shot	Haro Senft	
1987	Smaragd	Willi	Veith von Fürstenberg	
1987	Lethal Obsession	Pfeffer	Peter Patzak	
1987	Ossegg oder Die Wahrheit über Hänsel und Gretel	Major Strümpel	Thees Klahn	
1989	The Philosopher	A musician	Rudolf Thome	
1989	With the Next Man Everything Will Be Different	2. Stammgast	Xaver Schwarzenberger	
1989	Spider's Web	Roter	Bernhard Wicki	
1991	Heart in the Hand		Uwe Janson	
1991	Staub vor der Sonne		Petra Katharina Wagner	
1993	Just a Matter of Duty	Jean Blome / Hans Blome	Thomas Mitscherlich	
1994	Turn Down the Music	Frank's Father	Thomas Arslan	
1995	Secret of Love	Mann mit dem Kreuz	Rudolf Thome	
1998	Dunckel	Gambler	Lars Kraume	
1998	Just Married	Willi Klein	Rudolf Thome	
1999	Dealer	Barbesitzer	Thomas Arslan	
1999	Tails You Win, Heads You Lose	Maja's father	Hans-Günther Bücking	
2000	Paradiso: Seven Days with Seven Women	Rolf Silber	Rudolf Thome	
2000	Bloody Weekend	Wöller	Thomas Roth	
2000	Love, Money, Love	Einweiser Schrottplatz	Philip Gröning	
