= Werner Bokelberg =

German photographer and actor (1937–2024)

- Born: 22 October 1937; Bremen, Gau Weser-Ems, Germany
- Died: 20 August 2024 (aged 86); Hamburg, Germany
- Occupations: Photographer; Film actor
- Organization: Stern

Werner Bokelberg (22 October 1937 – 20 August 2024) was a German photographer and film actor. He worked in Hamburg, Paris and New York City. He is known for portraits of celebrities for Stern magazine.

== Life and career ==
Bokelberg was born in Bremen on 22 October 1937. After training as a photographer, he wanted to become a comedian. He studied acting at the acting department of the Wiesbaden conservatory, with Axel Ivers and Robert Kleinert.

He returned to his original profession, working for Stern from 1962 to 1972. He portrayed celebrities including Uschi Obermaier, Pablo Picasso, Salvador Dalí, Brian Jones, Andy Warhol, Romy Schneider, Rainer Langhans, and shot scenes representing the 1968 student movement. As actor, he played himself in the 1973 comedy Sylvie by Klaus Lemke. He later worked in advertisements, including campaigns for Deutsche Bank and Lufthansa. He moved to Paris and became a collector of photography.

His son is the cameraman Oliver Bokelberg.

Bokelberg died in Hamburg on 20 August 2024, at the age of 86.

== Publications ==
- Dalí, Salvador: Da-Da-Dali, Schünemann, 1966
- Bokelberg, Werner (1980). Vending machine cards (in German). Dortmund: Harenberg. ISBN 978-3-88379-197-5.
- Träume vom Helden: Schauspielerinnen der dreissiger Jahre (in German). Dortmund: Harenberg. 1982. ISBN 978-3-88379-333-7.
- Bokelberg, Werner; Dalí, Salvador (2004). Da Da Dali. Bielefeld: Kerber Verlag. ISBN 978-3-936646-76-4.
