= Elective Affinities (disambiguation) =

Elective Affinities is an 1809 novel by Johann Wolfgang von Goethe.

Elective Affinities also may refer to:

- Elective Affinities (Magritte) (1933), painting by René Magritte
- Elective Affinities (film) (1974), East German film directed by Siegfried Kühn
- The Elective Affinities (1996), Italian film directed by Paolo and Vittorio Taviani
- Elective Affinities (Adjmi) (2005), theater monologue by David Adjmi
