= Brigitte Streubel =

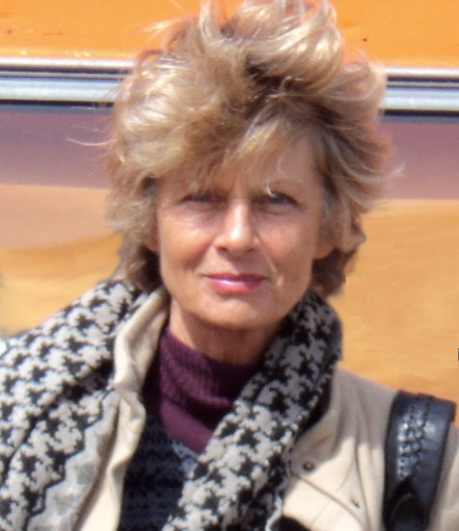
Brigitte Streubel (2012)

Brigitte Streubel (born 27 January 1950) is a German former photo-model, sometime actress and author. She is, in particular, known for her membership of Der Harem - described variously as a "virtual commune" or a "self-discovery group" - around Rainer Langhans.

== Life ==
Brigitte Streubel was born in North-west Bavaria and grew up in Hagen in the Ruhr region. By the time she was nineteen she had already worked for a year as a photo-model in Düsseldorf, featured in various publications including the mass-circulation Brigitte junior. In 1969, accepting an invitation from a major Paris agency turned out to be the launch-pad for a career as an international photo-model, working between 1969 and 1976 in Milan, Rome and London.

In 1972 Streubel met Rainer Langhans and his fellow "K1" commune member Uschi Obermaier, both of whom were (and remain) politically engaged members of "Generation '68". The three of them teamed up in 1976 with the photographer Anna Werner and the thespian polymath Jutta Winkelmann to establish an "experimental living community" in Munich - in many respects a small commune of their own - which became known as The Harem and received significant levels of media attention over the years. They were joined in 1978 by the film-maker and journalist Christa Ritter and in 1991 by Jutta Winkelmann's twin sister, the writer-photographer Gisela Getty. The primary focus of this experiment in community living at Munich-Schwabing by Rainer Langhans and the five women is a spiritual one. It has endured.

Her first stage role came in 1974 when she appeared in Ulli Lommel's drama Wachtmeister Rahn (1974), which took as its main theme a killer policeman. She also appeared briefly in one of Lommel's cinema films, A Second Spring (1975), in which Curd Jürgens took the lead role. In 1978 she appeared a "Eva" in Uschi Reich's television drama "Keiner kann was dafür" (loosely "No one can do anything about it"), also doubling up as the costume designer for the production. In 1979 she took a role in the short film "Smash - Gefahr aus der Unendlichkeit" ("Smash - The danger of endlessness"), directed by Gisela Weilemann. She worked as an assistant for the director Dominik Graf in 1989 on the comedy "Tiger, Lion, Panther".

Streubel also works as a yoga teacher, and since 1982 has worked with video. In 2007 she published the video "Five Tibetans" with contributions from the author-translator Maruscha Magyarosy (who is another yoga teacher). She also provided contributions to a book produced by Bärbel Schäfer and Monika Schuck entitled "Das Glücksgeheimnis: Paare erzählen vom Gelingen ihrer Liebe" ("The secret of happiness: Couples on their successes in love").

== Politics ==
Brigitte Streubel has been a member of the Pirate Party since 2012.
