= Niklaus Schilling =

Swiss film director

- Born: 23 April 1944; Basel, Switzerland
- Died: 6 May 2016 (aged 72)
- Occupations: Film director Cinematographer; Screenwriter
- Years active: 1967–1996

Niklaus Schilling (23 April 1944 – 6 May 2016) was a Swiss film director, cinematographer, and screenwriter. He directed 13 films between 1967 and 1996. His 1977 film The Expulsion from Paradise was entered into the 27th Berlin International Film Festival. The following year, his film Rhinegold was entered into the 28th Berlin International Film Festival.

== Selected filmography ==
- Forty Eight Hours to Acapulco (dir. Klaus Lemke, 1967)
- 24 Hour Lover (1968)
- Detectives (dir. Rudolf Thome, 1969)
- Don't Fumble, Darling (dir. May Spils, 1970)
- Nightshade (1972)
- The Expulsion from Paradise (1977)
- Rhinegold (1978)
- The Willi Busch Report (1979)
- The Lite Trap (1982)
- The Woman Without a Body and the Projectionist (1984)
- Dormire (1985)
- The Spirit (1989)
- Border Frenzy (1992)
