= Anna Werner =

German photographer (born 1941)

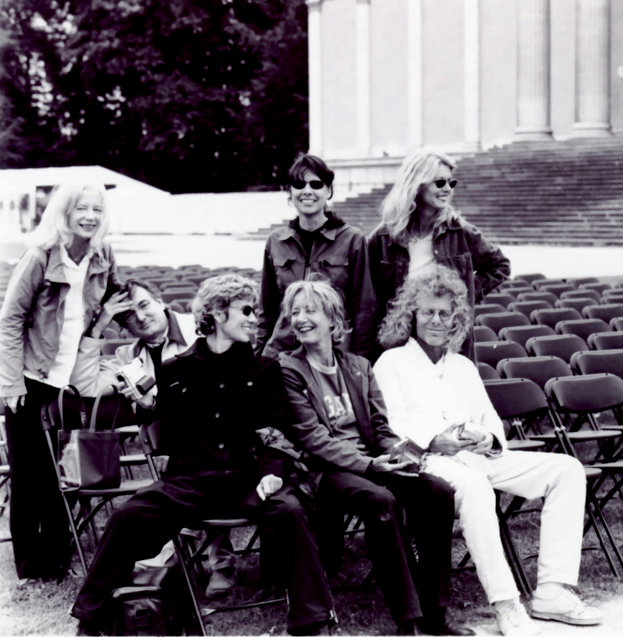
"Der Harem" in 2000 (Anna Werner is at the extreme left of the frame)

Anna Werner (born Munich, 1941) is a German photographer. She is, in particular, known for her membership of Der Harem - described variously as a "virtual commune" or a "self-discovery group" - around Rainer Langhans.

== Life ==
Anna Werner grew up in the foothills of the Bavarian Alps at Walchensee where her mother, born Norma Bucherer, celebrated her one hundredth birthday on 19 October 2011. Anna's mother died two days short of what would have been her one hundred and fifth birthday. Till 2003 Norma Werner was still running the "Café Bucherer" which her own father - Anna's maternal grandfather - had set up in 1924. Anna Werner's father was an artist from the north of Germany.

While still young Anna Werner moved to Mexico where she lived and travelled alone with her camera for a year and a half before being joined by her younger sister, Frauke. Gustavo Díaz Ordaz, the Mexican president was so enthused by the sisters' yodeling and dulcimer playing that he provided them with a Letter of Recommendation. During 1967, touring the United States of America, the two of them lived through the Hippie Summer of Love in San Francisco. It was around this time in the United States that she first met Jazon Wonders, later the father of her daughter Janna, known today as a film maker and musician in the band Ya-Ha!.

Her sister Frauke died young, possibly by suicide. Anna Werner was much affected: she returned to West Germany. Without Frauke there was no more music, and she turned to photography. In 1972 she got to know the former K1 communard Rainer Langhans soon after the very public ending of Langhans' partnership with Uschi Obermaier. In 1976, with the Langhans and the photo-models Brigitte Streubel and Jutta Winkelmann Werner founded the "experimental living community" which subsequently became known as The Harem in Munich. The community were joined in 1978 by Christa Ritter and in 1991 by Jutta's twin sister, Gisela Getty. The primarily spiritually based co-existence of Langhans and five women continues to this day in Munich-Schwabing. Anna Werner's own membership has been semi-detached. In the mid-1980s she moved back to the United States which is where her daughter was born. More recently, she was for several years the only member of the virtual commune to be based not in Munich-Schwabing but in the mountains to the south, in Walchensee where until it was rented out she helped her mother with the running of the family café.
