= Negresco (film) =

1968 film

- Directed by: Klaus Lemke
- Written by: Ingo Hermes; Klaus Lemke; Max Zihlmann
- Produced by: Doris Rathgen; Thilo Theilen; Joachim von Vietinghoff; Peter Wortmann
- Starring: Ira von Fürstenberg; Paul Hubschmid; Gérard Blain
- Cinematography: Michael Marszalek
- Edited by: Renate Willeg
- Music by: Klaus Doldinger
- Production company: FIOR Film
- Distributed by: Eckelkamp Verleih
- Release date: 22 August 1968
- Running time: 95 minutes
- Country: West Germany
- Language: German

Negresco (German: Negresco – Eine tödliche Affäre) is a 1968 West German crime drama film directed by Klaus Lemke and starring Ira von Fürstenberg, Paul Hubschmid and Gérard Blain. The film's sets were designed by the art director Monika Altmann. Location shooting took place at the Villa Kerylos in Beaulieu-sur-Mer. It was produced as part of the New German Cinema movement.

== Synopsis ==
In West Berlin the British photographer Roger meets Laura, a model and the two head to the French Riviera together, but soon find themselves in danger from the activities Laura's villainous husband Parrish.

== Cast ==
- Ira von Fürstenberg as Laura
- Paul Hubschmid as Parrish
- Gérard Blain as Roger
- Serge Marquand as Borell
- Christa Linder as Anita
- Ricky Cooper as Jeff
- Volker Heim as Nicolas
- Charly Kommer as Charly
- Liddia Yadda as Lydia
- Karsten Peters as Delloo
- Halinka Törek as Nadja
- Eva Renzi as Self
- Werner Bokelberg as Self
- Erroll Garner as Self

== Bibliography ==
- Abel, Marco & Fisher, Jaimey (ed.) New German Cinema and Its Global Contexts: A Transnational Art Cinema. Wayne State University Press, 2025.
- Bock, Hans-Michael & Bergfelder, Tim. The Concise CineGraph. Encyclopedia of German Cinema. Berghahn Books, 2009.
- Gerhardt, Christina & Abel, Marco. Celluloid Revolt: German Screen Cultures and the Long 1968. Camden House, 2019.
- Rother, Rainer (ed.) German Film: From the Archives of the Deutsche Kinemathek. Hatje Cantz Verlag, 2024.
