= Gisela Getty =

German photographer and film director, designer (born 1949)

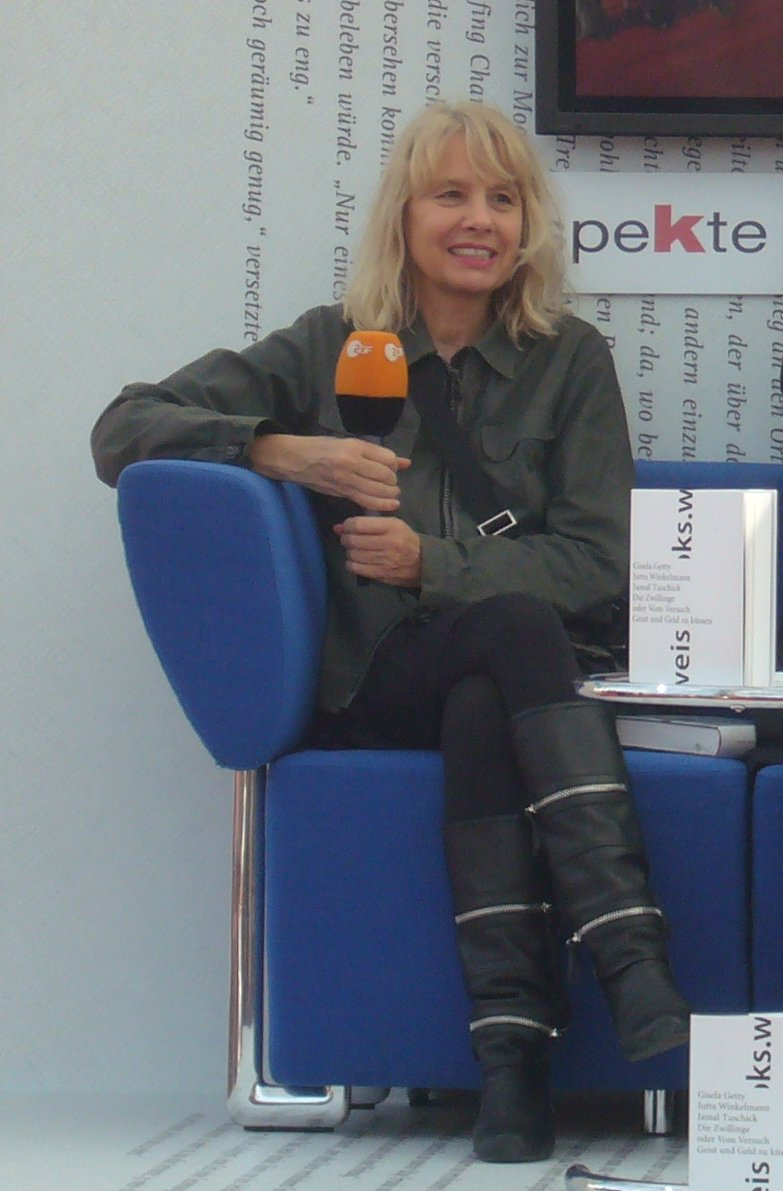
- Getty in 2008
- Born: Gisela Martine Schmidt; 3 April 1949 (age 77); Kassel, Hessen, U.S.-occupied Germany
- Education: Kassel Arts Academy
- Occupations: Photographer; film director; designer; author
- Spouses: Gerhard Büttenbender (m. 1969, divorced) Rolf Zacher (divorced) John Paul Getty III (m. 1974; div. 1993)
- Children: 2; including Balthazar Getty

Gisela Martine Getty (née Schmidt; born 3 April 1949) is a German photographer, film director, designer, and author. She is known for her involvement in the German 1968 movement, along with her late sister, Jutta Winkelmann.

== Life ==
=== Early years ===
Getty was born Gisela Martine Schmidt in 1949 in Kassel, West Germany. Her father, Julius Schmidt, was a writer and military historian. Her mother, born Ruth Winzenburg, was a teacher who left her job in an agricultural college to care for her family. Gisela attended the Waldorf school in Kassel with her twin sister, Jutta. There, she studied graphic arts, fashion, film, and photography at the Kassel Arts Academy between 1966 and 1970. (Note: Sources differ over whether the twins attended the Kassel Arts Academy between 1966 and 1970, or between 1968 and 1972.)

In 1968, the sisters partnered with Adolf Winkelmann and Gerhard Büttenbender to form the Kassel Film Collective. In 1969, they won first prize at the International Short Film Festival in Oberhausen. Their 31-minute film, Heinrich Viel, about a production line worker, was filmed in the Volkswagen factory in Baunatal.

Also in 1969, Gisela Schmidt married Gerhard Büttenbender. Jutta married Adolf Winkelmann shortly afterward.

=== Berlin, Rome, and California ===
Gisela initially came to public attention during the 1968 student protests of the West German government. The years that followed, she was active in the demonstrations in Kassel and West Berlin. Getty's marriage with Büttenbender ended, and in 1970 she relocated to Berlin with Jutta. During this time, Getty and Jutta began friendships with actor Rolf Zacher and Rainer Langhans. Sources are inconsistent when a group including Jutta, Gisela, and Rolf Zacher moved to Rome. At around the same time, Gisela married Zacher. The marriage was brief, but it lasted long enough to produce a daughter, Anna, born towards the end of October 1972. the lifestyle that Gisela was leading in Rome was not conducive to safely bring up a new baby, and Anna was quickly sent to Kassel to be looked after by the family.

During the early part of 1973, she met the teenager John Paul Getty who a few months later, still in Rome, became the victim of a very widely publicized 'Ndrangheta kidnapping. Getty had been expelled from his Rome-based international school the previous year, following the death of his stepmother, therefore becoming a teenage drop-out. Soon after he first set eyes on the twins the three of them became inseparable, living together in a shared basement apartment in Rome-Trastevere, sharing the bed as a threesome and "convinced that we could achieve anything we wanted". Nevertheless, as Gisela later told an interviewer, at that stage "... there wasn’t more than holding hands".

Following the kidnapping, Gisela and Jutta fell under suspicion and were briefly detained by the authorities in Rome. By the time the kidnapping took place, during July 1973, the relationship with Getty had intensified. Following the child's release after five months (believed to have been in return for a large ransom payment from an enraged grandfather) Gisela Zacher and Paul Getty were in love. They married towards the end of 1974. Getty was disinherited by his grandfather who had some time previously stipulated that the boy should not marry before reaching the age of 22 or 23 (sources differ). Balthazar Getty, the young couple's son, was born towards the end of January 1975. Many aspects of the kidnapping incident remain unknown or undisclosed; however, media speculation has proliferated.

By the time Balthazar was born, Gisela and her husband were in California, initially living together in Los Angeles and subsequently — in San Francisco. Gisela and Jutta had become media personalities through their involvement in the 1968 protests. The tragic events of 1973 and the marriage to Paul Getty greatly enhanced Gisela's media profile. By the time she left Rome for California she and her husband were part of a social network of arts-world celebrities that included Dennis Hopper, Leonard Cohen, Bob Dylan, Carlo Ponti and Federico Fellini.

The kidnapping had inflicted levels of intense trauma on each of them that would remain with both. In California, Gisela was separated from her sister, but the "wild child" lifestyle continued in other respects. Sources relate how her husband found refuge but also dependency through intensification of his drug habit. There are reports that it was to get them away from the excesses of the lifestyle she and her husband shared, that Gisela eventually took the children away from their home together to live in a state of "relative normality" in San Francisco. Here she became professionally involved with the Magic Theatre Company and wrote plays. Matters took a turn for the worse in 1981 after a medically prescribed combination of drugs – allegedly intended to reduce his dependency issues – sent Paul Getty into a coma. Physically, his recovery was never more than partial: his sight was permanently impaired, and he was required to use a wheelchair for the rest of his life. The couple had separated in 1980 and following "the accident" in 1981 Gisela Getty returned to the Federal Republic, settling in Munich. Gisela and Paul remained friendly: divorce followed only in 1993.

=== Membership of "The Harem" ===
Jutta and Gisela had met Bob Dylan for the first time during his European tour in 1966: a certain mutual attraction had been sparked by the encounter. When they realized that the threesome they enjoyed in Rome would not last forever and that Gisela was going to marry Paul Getty, the twins agreed that Jutta would "hold out for Bob Dylan". In 1976 she teamed up with the film-maker and former communard Rainer Langhans, the photographer Anna Werner and the Photo-model Brigitte Streubel to form a new "principally spiritually oriented self-discovery commune" in Munich. They were joined in 1978 by the filmmaker and journalist Christa Ritter, and by Gisela Getty in 1991. The press soubriquet "Harem", which the media-savvy members were content to adopt, was an obvious response to the gender imbalance. "The Harem" has received significant levels of media attention over the years. Gisela Getty "brought money and illustrious contacts" when she joined, and for a time may have distorted the dynamics of the Harem community, but that risk appears to have receded more recently.

=== Timothy Leary ===
Timothy Leary was a psychology professor at Harvard University with a close interest in psychedelic drugs. His dismissal from Harvard in 1963, followed by frequent arrests during the next couple of decades in connection with his enthusiastic endorsement of (probably illegal) aspects of the drug culture, turned him into a media celebrity. President Nixon helpfully described Leary as "the most dangerous man in America". In the early 1990s Leary turned his attention to death. During his later years Leary suffered from prostate cancer, and after accepting that his own death was becoming imminent, Leary agreed that Gisela Getty and Jutta Winkelmann might make a documentary film on the subject. The twins spent a considerable amount of time with Leary and his partner, Aileen Getty, preparing their documentary during 1992 and 1993. (Aileen was a sister of Gisela's husband.) The result was a television documentary "Der Tod steht ihnen gut" (loosely, "Death suits them well") which appeared in 1994. Critics were underwhelmed that the resulting movie was presented as a "normal" television documentary, without any disclosure that the twins were long-standing friends and admirers of the "High priest of the drug culture". There was much about the things Leary represented that had fallen out of public favor since the 1970s, and although the film was duly screened on one of the more obscure German television channels, it has subsequently been largely overlooked. Nevertheless, as is pointed out in the biographical note on Gisela Getty's web page, "Der Tod steht ihnen gut" did win the bronze medal in the "History and Society" category at the 1995 The New Yorker Festival.

=== Literary engagement ===
Gisela Getty's public profile was much diminished after she and Paul Getty divorced in 1993. Nevertheless, she continues to feature in contemporary reports, both in recollections of her wild years and on account, more recently, of her literary work. In 2008 she published "Die Zwillinge oder Vom Versuch, Geld und Geist zu küssen" (loosely, "The twins: on the attempt to embrace mammon and spirit" ) jointly with her sister, Jutta Winkelmann and the Kassel-born writer-journalist Jamal Tuschick. It appeared online five years later. For Jutta and Gisela the book is a confessional autobiographical work, dealing with aspects of the twins' lives, as part of the '68 generation, in Kassel, Berlin and Rome. Critical reactions were mixed, although the power of the book to stimulate overblown prose in others was on shameless display in the reviews. Rainer Moritz shared with readers of the Neue Zürcher Zeitung his opinion that the book was "interesting principally as a historical record of deluded narcissism" ("...vor allem als historisches Dokument eines verblendeten Narzissmus interessant"). Writing in Der Spiegel, Matthias Matussek had clearly had more fun with the book: "... a devilish cocktail of drug-fueled delirium, gangsterly insanity and sex in the beds of artists ... The twins have a sexual gangsterism and a sadomasochistic sophistication that is still compelling even at the second reading".

"Unter dem Cherrytree" appeared in 2013 and was reviewed in Die Welt. Matthias Matussek was on hand again. He seems to have been perplexed, describing the little book as "a personal mythology ..., half Japanese manga, [and] half a blend of Indian mythology, apocalypse and the eternally spinning wheel of life".

== Output (selection) ==
- Kidnapping Paul. Die Geschichte einer Entführung (jointly with Jutta Winkelmann), weissbooks.w, Frankfurt am Main 2018, ISBN 978-3-86337-125-8.
- Unter dem Cherrytree (jointly with Jutta Winkelmann), BoD Norderstedt, Edition Bildstein, Leipzig, Dresden 2013, ISBN 978-3-7322-4630-4.
- The Twins (jointly with Jutta Winkelmann), Blumenbar, Berlin 2010, ISBN 978-3-936738-72-8.
- Die Zwillinge oder Vom Versuch, Geld und Geist zu küssen, (jointly with Jutta Winkelmann und Jamal Tuschick), weissbooks.w, Frankfurt am Main 2008, ISBN 978-3-940888-01-3.
- Future-Sex (gemeinsam mit Jutta Winkelmann), Metropolitan-Verlag, Düsseldorf, München 1996, ISBN 3-89623-017-4.
