= Uwe Bohm =

German actor (1962–2022)

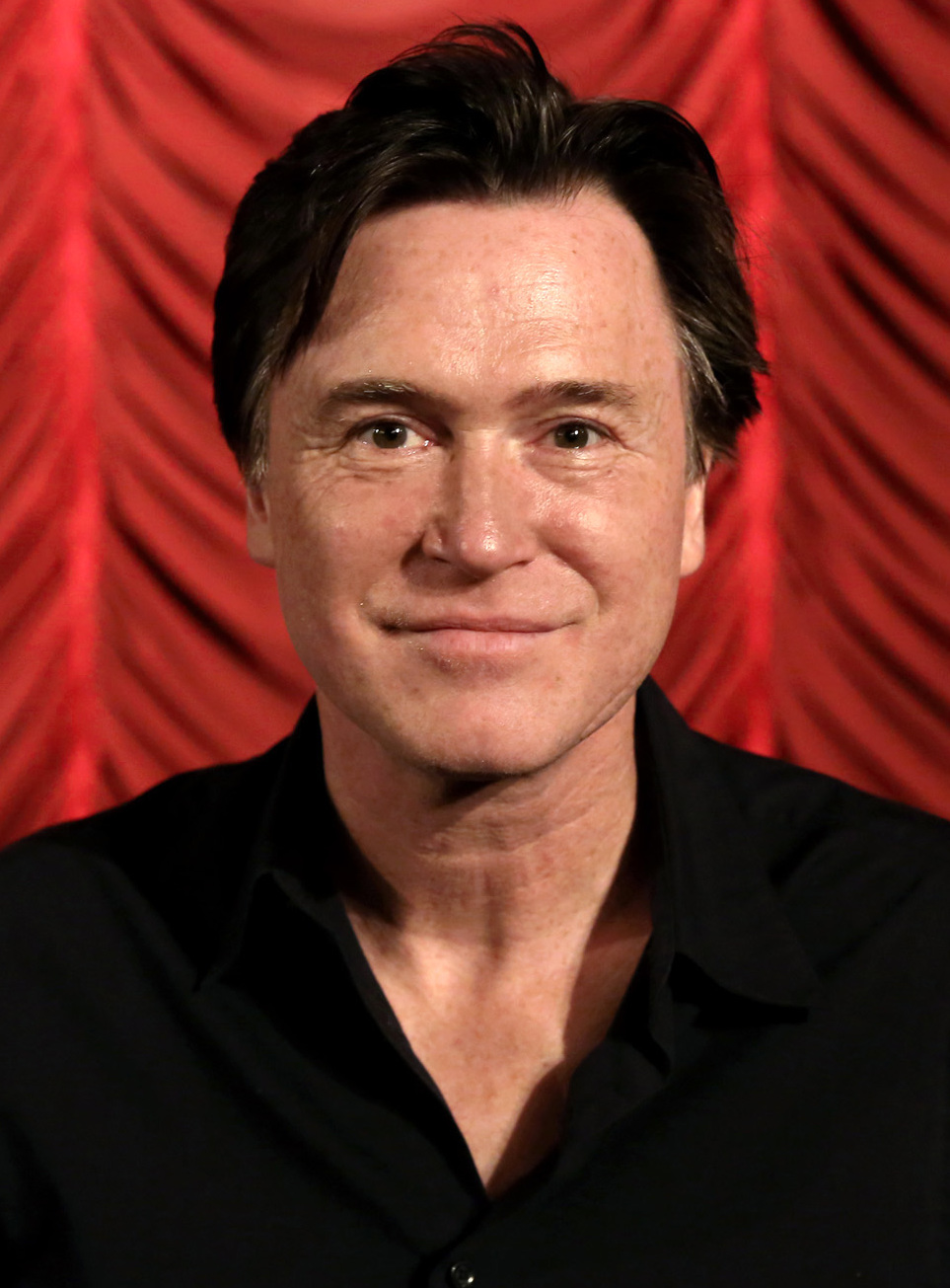
- Bohm in 2013
- Born: Uwe Enkelmann; 23 January 1962; Wilhelmsburg, Hamburg, West Germany
- Died: 8 April 2022 (aged 60)
- Occupation: Actor
- Years active: 1976–2022

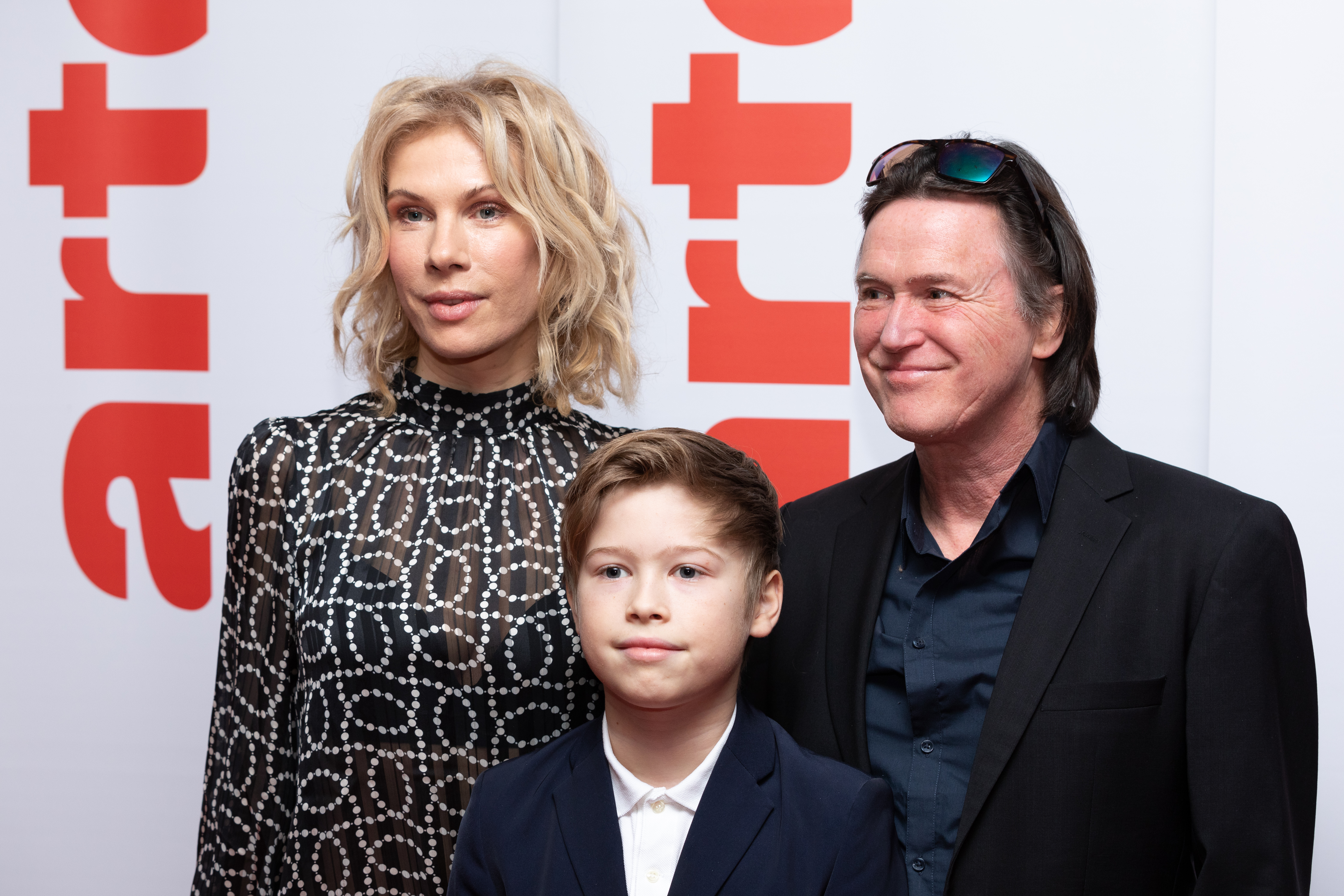
Ninon, Jimmy and Uwe Bohm at Berlinale 2020

Uwe Bohm (born Uwe Enkelmann; 23 January 1962 – 8 April 2022) was a German actor. He appeared in more than 100 films and television shows from 1973 to 2020.

== Biography ==
Director Hark Bohm engaged the 11-year-old Uwe Enkelmann for the film I can also build an Ark in 1973. In 1976 he played the leading role in Hark Bohm's youth drama North Sea Is Dead Sea. The director finally adopted Enkelmann, who came from a problematic family background, and brought him to Munich. Enkelmann took Bohm's name and worked with him on numerous films. He played a leading role in Yasemin (1988) by Hark Bohm, which was West Germany's official submission for Best Foreign film at the 61st Academy Awards. He also starred in Hark Bohm's 1990 film Herzlich willkommen, which was entered into the 40th Berlin International Film Festival.

As a young adult he began an apprenticeship as a painter and varnisher, but broke it off and has been working as an actor ever since. On stage, he worked multiple times with the famous stage director Peter Zadek between the 1980s and 2000s. Bohm was also a prolific actor on German television, especially known for villainous roles, and appeared alone in the series Tatort nine times.

Bohm was married to the actress Ninon Bohm. The couple had one child. Bohm died unexpectedly from a sudden cardiac arrest in April 2022, aged 60.

== Selected filmography ==
- North Sea Is Dead Sea (1976)
- Moritz, Dear Moritz (1978)
- The Heartbreakers (1983)
- Yasemin (1988)
- Herzlich willkommen (1990)
- A Demon in My View (1992)
- Paul und Clara – Liebe vergeht nie (1999, TV film)
- Cloned to Kill (2000, TV film)
- Heart (2001)
- Unpleasant Encounter in the Moonlight (2004, TV film)
- Hunger for Life (2004, TV film)
- Vacation (2007)
- The Lie (2008, TV film)
- Germany 09 (2009)
- In the Shadows (2010)
- Gold (2013)
- A Blind Hero: The Love of Otto Weidt (2014, TV film)
- Sanctuary (2015)
- Goodbye Berlin (2016)
