= Amrum (film) =

German drama film

- Theatrical release poster
- Directed by: Fatih Akin
- Written by: Fatih Akin; Hark Bohm
- Produced by: Fatih Akin; Lara Förtsch; Herman Weigel
- Starring: Diane Kruger; Laura Tonke; Jasper Billerbeck; Detlev Buck; Lisa Hagmeister; Matthias Schweighöfer
- Cinematography: Karl Walter Lindenlaub
- Edited by: Andrew Bird
- Music by: Hainbach
- Production companies: Bombero International; Warner Bros. Film Productions Germany; Rialto Film
- Distributed by: Warner Bros. Pictures
- Release dates: 15 May 2025 (Cannes); 9 October 2025 (Germany)
- Running time: 93 minutes
- Country: Germany
- Languages: German; North Frisian
- Box office: $9.3 million

Amrum is a 2025 German historical drama film directed by Fatih Akin, and co-written by Akin with Hark Bohm, based on Bohm's childhood on the German island of Amrum during the last months of World War II. It stars Jasper Billerbeck, Kian Köppke, Laura Tonke, Diane Kruger, Detlev Buck and Matthias Schweighöfer.

The film had its world premiere at the Cannes Premiere section of the 2025 Cannes Film Festival, on 15 May, where it was met with positive reviews from critics. It was theatrically released in Germany on 9 October by Warner Bros. Pictures.

Bohm died two months after the film's theatrical release in Germany.

== Plot ==
1945, in the final weeks of World War II, in a small village on the island of Amrum off Germany's North Sea coast. Twelve-year-old Nanning Bohm, the eldest child in his family, works in the potato fields or gathers driftwood for firewood to help his mother feed the family. She is a staunch Nazi and in the later stages of pregnancy. He, his aunt Ena, and his two younger siblings had to flee to the island from bombed-out Hamburg.

Nanning's father is an SS-Obersturmbannführer (lieutenant colonel) and is away at war; his wife is left to fend for herself on Amrum, while the villagers secretly listen to proscribed jazz on the radio.

As the war draws to a close, Nanning faces new challenges. Since the birth of his sister and the death of Adolf Hitler, his mother has fallen into a deep depression and refuses to eat. Nanning tries to find creative ways to fulfill her craving for white bread with butter and honey, something he continues to struggle with throughout the movie, as the war has left the island with a severe shortage of all materials. Through bartering, he tries to obtain the coveted ingredients like butter and sugar.

The boy gets to know the island, its inhabitants, and the North Frisian language spoken locally. However, while helping with seal hunting and gutting a rabbit, he often experiences close encounters with death. He learns that his uncle Theo, who gave him a whaling knife at birth, was forced to stay in America because of the Nazis, and that they murdered his fiancée, Ruth. Theo appears to him in a dream and confronts him: "You are not to blame, but you are still involved." As the younger of the two, he bears no personal guilt for his parents' Nazi past, but he cannot escape their legacy and the questions it raises.

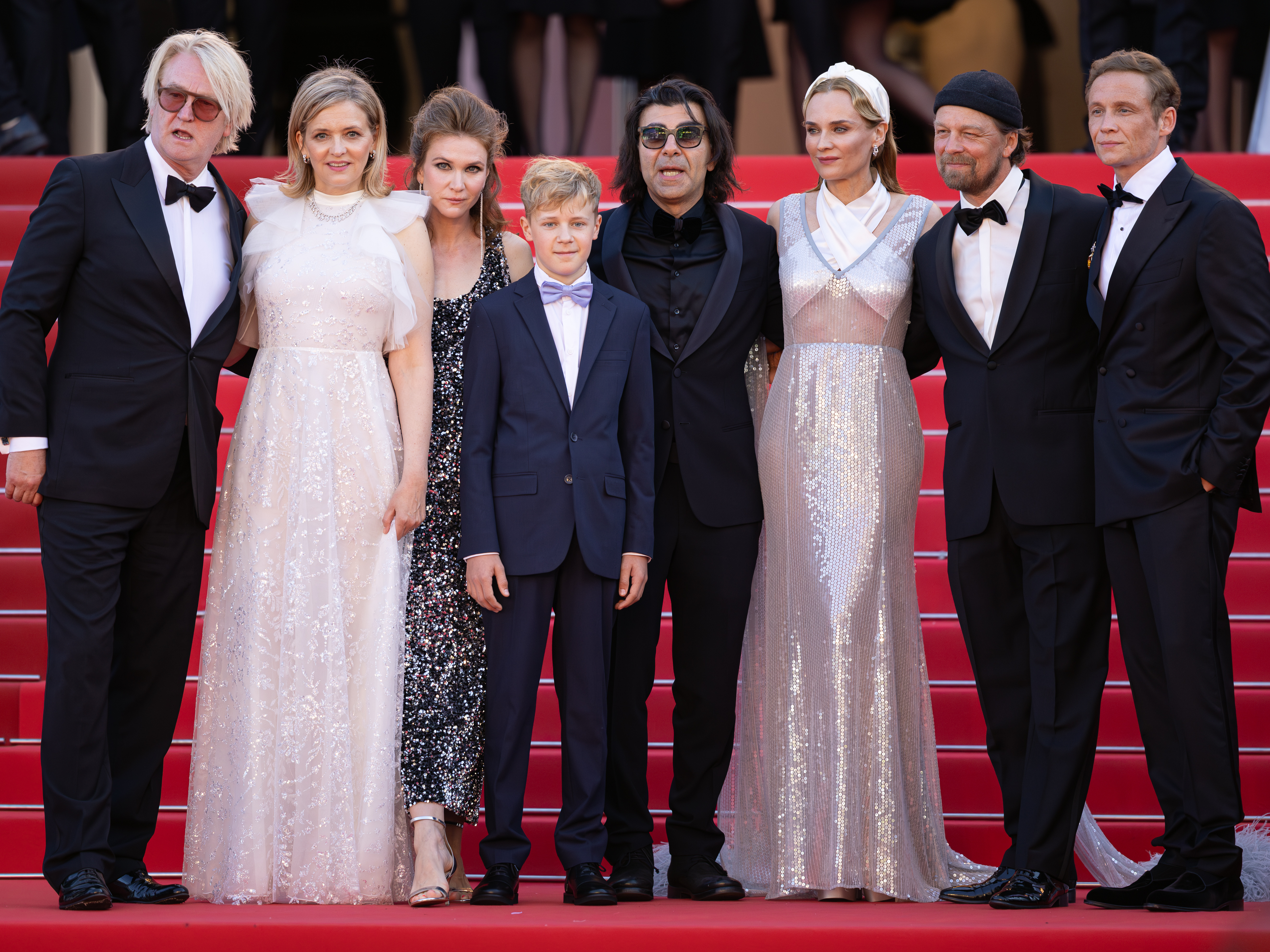
Cast and crew of Amrum at the 2025 Cannes Film Festival

== Cast ==
- Jasper Billerbeck as Nanning Bohm
  - Hark Bohm as Older Nanning Bohm
- Kian Köppke as Hermann Bohm
- Laura Tonke as Hille Hagener
- Diane Kruger as Tessa Bendixen
- Lisa Hagmeister as Aunt Ena
- Detlev Buck as Sam Gangsters
- Matthias Schweighöfer as Uncle Theo
- Lars Jessen as Grandpa Arjan

== Production ==
The film was first announced in 2022, and is based on the childhood memories of German director and screenwriter Hark Bohm, a long-standing friend of director Fatih Akin. It was produced by Bombero International and Warner Bros. Film Productions Germany, in co-production with Rialto Film. Bohm had initially planned to direct the film himself before handing directorial duties to Akin, who co-wrote the screenplay.

The cast is led by child actors Jasper Billerbeck and Kian Köppke, and also includes Laura Tonke, Diane Kruger, Lisa Hagmeister, Detlev Buck, Matthias Schweighöfer and Lars Jessen.

Principal photography took place in Hamburg, Germany, as well as in Denmark and on the island of Amrum, beginning in April 2024.

== Release ==
The film had its world premiere at the Cannes Premiere section of the 2025 Cannes Film Festival, on 15 May. It marked Akin's return to Cannes' Official Selection after 8 years. It was also selected for the International competition section of the 56th International Film Festival of India in November 2025.

It was released in German theaters on 9 October 2025 by Warner Bros. Pictures.

Kino Lorber acquired the U.S. rights; the film was screened at Quad Cinema in New York City April 17–June 4, 2026.

== Reception ==
=== Box office ===
It grossed $8 million at the German box office. Total worldwide gross came to $9.3 million.

=== Critical response ===
On review aggregator Rotten Tomatoes, the film holds an approval rating of 98% based on 46 reviews, with an average rating of 7.4/10. The website's critical consensus states: "All the more emotionally powerful because of its dramatic restraint, Amrum is a painterly coming-of-age picture that thoughtfully expands filmmaker Fatih Akin's career-spanning exploration of German identity". On Metacritic, the film has a weighted average score of 76 out of 100, based on 14 critics, indicating "generally favorable reviews".
