= Natalia Avelon =

German actress and singer

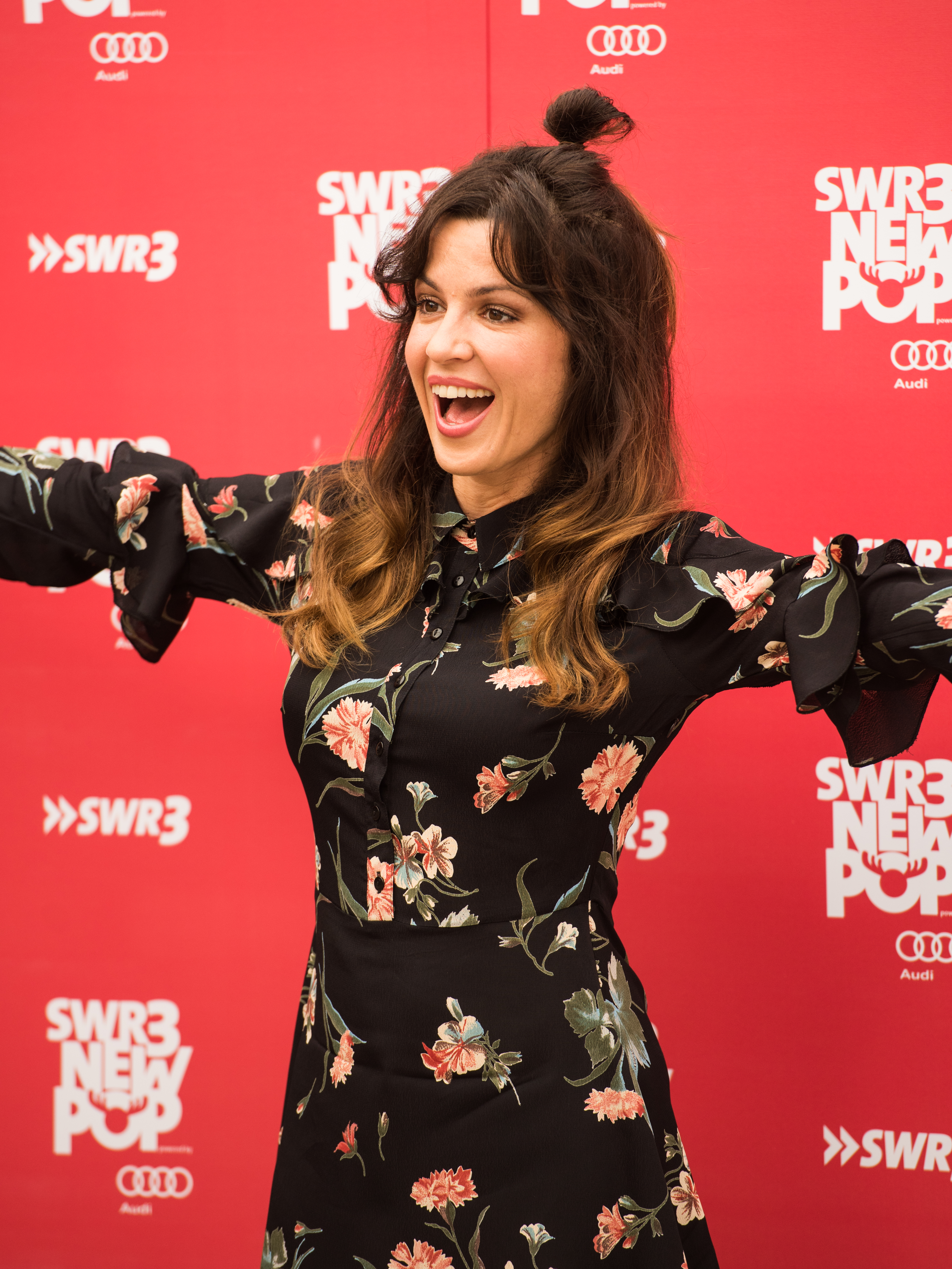
- Avelon in 2017
- Born: Natalia Siwek; 29 March 1980 (age 46); Wrocław, Poland
- Occupations: Actress; singer
- Years active: 2001–present

Natalia Avelon (née Siwek; born 29 March 1980) is a German actress and singer of Polish birth.

== Biography ==
Avelon was born Natalia Siwek on 29 March 1980 in Wrocław, Poland. When she was eight years old, she moved to Germany with her parents.

She played 1960s sex symbol Uschi Obermaier in Achim Bornhak's 2007 film Eight Miles High.

Avelon performed with HIM lead singer Ville Valo the duet of Lee Hazlewood's song "Summer Wine", which is part of the Eight Miles High soundtrack.

== Filmography ==
Year	Title	Role	Notes
2001	Der Schuh des Manitu	Uschi as a teenager	
2002	Der weiße Hirsch	Lola	Short film
2007	Eight Miles High	Uschi Obermaier	
2008	80 Minutes	Mona	
2008	Far Cry	Katia Chernov	
2009	Oh, What a Mess	Jil Grüngras	
2011	Wunderkinder	Rachel Brodsky	
2014	The Whole Shebang	Ingrid (young)	
2015	Drunter & Brüder	Anastasia	TV film
2018	Spielmacher	Helena Srna	
2020	It's for Your Own Good	Jazmin	

== Television ==
- Der Club der grünen Witwen (2001) – Kerstin Riemer
- Prinz und Paparazzi (2005)

Television series

- Rosa Roth – Geschlossene Gesellschaft (2002) – Simone
- Zwei Engel auf Streife – Wodka auf Ex (2002) – Tatjana
- Bewegte Männer – Die Oberweitenreform (2005) – Jenny
- Der Bulle von Tölz – Süsse Versuchung (2003) – Verkäuferin
- Sturm der Liebe – (2005)
- Ein Fall für zwei – Die schöne Tote (2005) – Dunja
- Tatort – Tod einer Heuschrecke (2008)
- Strike Back: Project Dawn (2011) – Lieutenant Marianna Schekter

=== Music videos ===
- Money and Women – Wyn Davies (2012) with Heike Makatsch, Karoline Schuch, Rolf Eden
