= Eight Miles High (film) =

2007 German biographical film

- Theatrical release poster
- Directed by: Achim Bornhak
- Written by: Dagmar Benke; Achim Bornhak; C. P. Hant; Olaf Kraemer
- Produced by: Ralph Brosche; Eberhard Junkersdorf
- Starring: Natalia Avelon
- Cinematography: Benjamin Dernbecher
- Edited by: Peter Przygodda
- Music by: Alexander Hacke
- Distributed by: Warner Bros. Pictures
- Release date: 1 February 2007
- Running time: 114 minutes
- Country: Germany
- Language: German
- Box office: $957,744

Eight Miles High (original title: Das wilde Leben, lit. The Wild Life) is a 2007 German biographical motion picture, set in the 1960s and depicting the "wild life" of Uschi Obermaier, a West German sex symbol and icon of the era.

== Plot ==
Obermaier enjoyed sexual freedom at the legendary Kommune 1 in Berlin after being with the krautrock band Bröselpilze. In the Kommune, she becomes friendly with Rainer Langhans. The young woman from Munich gains employment as a model, and becomes a sex symbol and youth icon. Now a cover girl in Playboy magazine, she meets rock stars such as Mick Jagger and Keith Richards, while Italian film producer, Carlo Ponti, offers her a ten-year contract, but she declines: her freedom is more important than a contract.

During her intensive relationship with Keith Richards, she begins to recognize the dark side of the shiny glamour world she lives in: the isolation of the stars, and the groupie-populated milieux of anonymous hotel rooms — this is not her idea of life.

She finds new freedom in a relationship with the adventurer Dieter Bockhorn (David Scheller). They fall in love and go on a six-year road trip around the world. Later, Bockhorn dies in a motorcycle accident in Mexico.

== Cast ==
- Natalia Avelon as Uschi Obermaier
- Matthias Schweighöfer as Rainer Langhans
- Milan Peschel - Freiberg
- David Scheller - Dieter Bockhorn
- Georg Friedrich - Wieland 'Lurchi' Vagts
- Victor Norén (singer of the Swedish band Sugarplum Fairy) as Mick Jagger
- Alexander Scheer as Keith Richards
- Urs Rechn as "the knocker" Norbert Grupe

== Production crew ==
- Directed by Achim Bornhak.
- Written by Achim Bornhak and Olaf Kraemer.
- Based on a work by C. P. Hant, Dagmar Benke and Olaf Kraemer

== Filming locations ==
- Berlin, Hamburg, Munich, and Bavaria in Germany
- Goa, Jaipur, and Rajasthan in India

== Soundtrack ==
Ville Valo and Natalia Avelon recorded a cover version of the Nancy Sinatra/Lee Hazlewood song Summer Wine for the soundtrack. A music video was also shot, featuring Valo and Avelon with the real Uschi Obermaier.
