= Herzlich willkommen =

1990 film

- Directed by: Hark Bohm
- Written by: Hark Bohm; Walter Kempowski (novel); Dorothee Schön
- Produced by: Hark Bohm
- Starring: Uwe Bohm
- Cinematography: Edward Klosinski
- Edited by: Moune Barius
- Release date: 22 February 1990
- Running time: 92 minutes
- Country: West Germany
- Language: German

Herzlich willkommen (English titles: Crossing Borders or Welcome Indeed!) is a 1990 West German drama film directed by Hark Bohm. It was entered into the 40th Berlin International Film Festival.

== Cast ==
- Uwe Bohm as Friedrich Dombrowski
- David Bohm as Fritz
- Barbara Auer as Elke Kramer
- Hark Bohm as Direktor Dr. Fischer
- Anna Thalbach as Iris
- Eva-Maria Hagen as Sekretärin
- Michael Gwisdek as Hausmeister
- Werner Abrolat as Pförtner
- Klaus Rathjens as Erzieher
- Heinz Hoenig as Iris' Father
