= Young Hitler =

- Hardcover, 2010 edition
- Author: Claus Hant with James Trivers, Alan Roche
- Language: English
- Published: 2010
- Publisher: Quartet Books
- Publication place: England
- Pages: 440
- ISBN: 0704371820
- OCLC: 461280423

Young Hitler is a fact based narrative ("non-fiction novel") that covers the time between Hitler's 16th and 30th year of age. The second part of the book is factual. It was written in English by German writer Claus Hant. Writers James Trivers and Alan Roche assisted Hant in producing the original English version of the book. Young Hitler was published in 2010 by Quartet Books, London.

== Summary ==
The book is divided into two sections: in the first part, a narrative retells the formative years of the young Adolf Hitler between 1907 and 1918, when he lived as a starving artist on the streets and in the asylums of Vienna, and then joined World War I as a volunteer on the Western Front. When the war ends, Hitler comes into contact with members of the Thule Society in Munich, an association of occultists who had launched a political party, the German Workers' Party (DAP). The narration ends in 1920 when Hitler takes over the DAP and turns it into the Nazi Party (NSDAP). In an interview with The Guardian, author Claus Hant explained that the events after 1920 are exhaustively documented in the numerous Hitler biographies. But what the biographies do not investigate is the time before then, when Hitler was transformed from inconsequential artist and drifter to towering political leader. Hant says that he has centered Young Hitler deliberately around this momentous transformation. According to Hant, this decisive turning point in Hitler's life can only be explained satisfactorily now that recent research has unearthed certain previously unknown data and facts.

The second part of the book is purely non-fiction. It contains detailed appendices with many little-known facts about Hitler. Most importantly, the appendices substantiate Hant's thesis which casts a surprising new light on the reasons behind Hitler's rise to power.

== Thesis ==
Young Hitler focuses on the question that has plagued historians since the end World War II. How did Hitler do it? How did such a nonentity - a man with only a primary school certificate, no money and no helpful connections manage to turn the everyday life of one of the most important industrialized nations of its time inside out within just a few years?

On the basis of recent and current research, Hant arrives at a twofold answer to this question. Hant states that Hitler was not as illiterate as once thought. According to Hant, Hitler was an extremely well-read man who also had an extensive knowledge of art. Not only did his exceptional memory help Hitler to apply his knowledge in a way that appealed to the dull masses, he also knew how to make an impression on intelligent and highly educated individuals in the top echelon of society. Hant also quotes various sources which document the fact that Hitler believed he had a special connection to the divine. Hitler did not merely pretend to be the “German Messiah”, says Hant. After what Hitler believed was a spiritual experience, he became convinced that he was indeed “the One”. Hant suggests that Hitler's spectacular success was based on his persuasiveness, but he came across as convincing only because of his absolute belief in himself and his mission. To understand the Hitler phenomenon, one must understand his self-image, says Hant, the self-image of a man who “knew” that he had been chosen by God. Publicly, however, Hitler never proclaimed who he believed himself to be. In order to be taken seriously in a world ruled by reason, he claimed to be nothing more than an “ordinary politician”, leaving his followers to organise the cult-like worship that developed around him. Hant argues that if Hitler's personality and his actions are the result of a religious delusion we need to adjust our image of Hitler. As Hant stated in an interview: “The current school of thought assumes that these statements (like calling himself “a tool of providence”) are lies helping him (Hitler) to promote his own myth. But my investigation reveals a different picture: when Hitler said these kinds of things, he was saying something about himself that he truly believed. However, the proponents of the ruling doctrine have fallen for Hitler's self portrayal as a purely secular leader. This has not been acknowledged so far, and we have to first learn to understand what that means.”

== Controversy ==
Hant has repeatedly accused the German media of “hypocrisy with regard to Hitler” and rejects a publication of Young Hitler in Germany. Consequently, the publication of Young Hitler in England was mostly ignored by the German press. Only Der Spiegel reviewed the book, treating Young Hitler merely as a piece of literature.

== Reception ==
Critics who were concerned with the book's literary value were divided in their opinion. Der Spiegel reviewer Wolfgang Höbel refers to Young Hitler as “slush”, while British author Anthony Read calls Young Hitler “ingenious and fascinating”.

Other comments relate its thesis regarding the reasons behind Hitler's rise rather than its literary merits. The Guardian included it in its mention of “the hottest books of the Frankfurt book fair” and the Sunday Express headlined: “an explosive new book turns our understanding of Hitler on its head.“
