= Elective Affinities =

1809 novel by Johann Wolfgang von Goethe

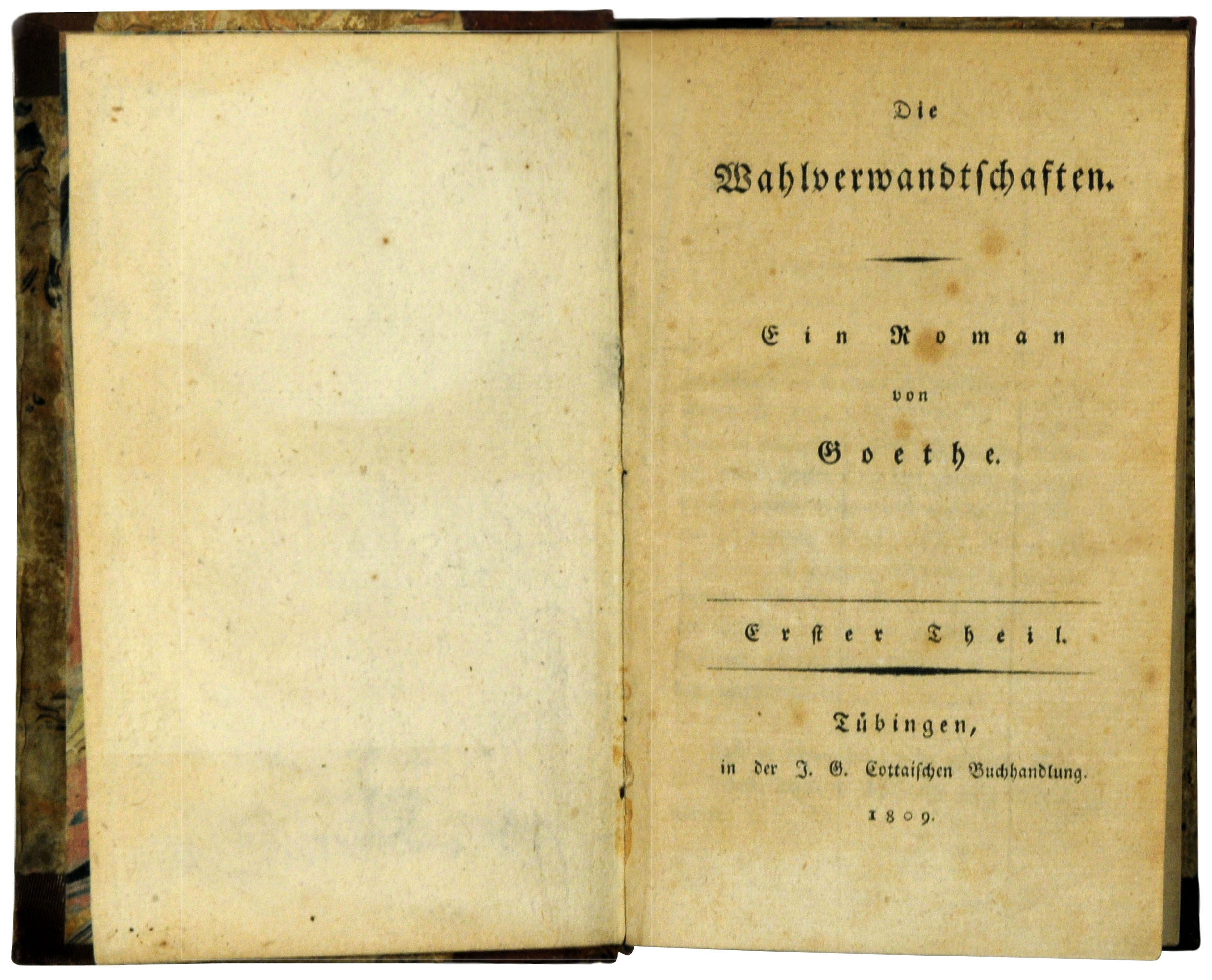
- The title page of the first edition
- Author: Johann Wolfgang von Goethe
- Original title: Die Wahlverwandtschaften
- Language: German (original); English (1854)
- Publisher: J. G. Cottaische Buchhandlung, Berlin
- Publication date: 1809

Elective Affinities (German: Die Wahlverwandtschaften), also translated under the title Kindred by Choice, is the third novel by Johann Wolfgang von Goethe, published in 1809. Situated around the city of Weimar, the book relates the story of Eduard and Charlotte, an aristocratic couple enjoying an idyllic but somewhat mundane life on a secluded estate; although it is the second marriage for both, their relationship deteriorates after they invite Eduard's friend Captain Otto and Charlotte's orphaned niece, Ottilie, to live with them in their mansion. The invitation to Ottilie and the Captain is described as an "experiment", as it indeed is. The house and its surrounding gardens are described as "a chemical retort in which the human elements are brought together for the reader to observe the resulting reaction." As if in a chemical reaction, each of the spouses experiences a strong new attraction, which is reciprocated: Charlotte, who represents reason, to the sensible and energetic Captain Otto; the impulsive and passionate Eduard to the adolescent and charming Ottilie. The conflict between passion and reason leads to chaos and ultimately to a tragic end.

The novel combines elements of Weimar Classicism, such as the plot layout as a scientific parable, with an opposing tendency towards Romanticism. The term “elective affinities” was originally a scientific term from chemistry, once widely used by scientists such as Robert Boyle, Isaac Newton and Antoine Lavoisier, at first to describe exothermic chemical reactions and later to refer to chemical reactions in which one ion would displace another. Goethe applied this understanding from physical chemistry as a metaphor for human passions supposedly being governed or regulated by such laws of chemical affinity, and examined whether the laws of chemistry somehow undermine or uphold the institution of marriage, as well as other human social relations. Voluntary renunciation also comes into play, a theme that recurs in his fourth novel, Wilhelm Meisters Wanderjahre, oder Die Entsagenden (Wilhelm Meister's Journeyman Years, or the Renunciants).

== Plot ==
=== Part 1 ===
After the deaths of their respective first spouses, Eduard and his childhood sweetheart, Charlotte, were able to marry. The aristocratic couple lives secluded on Eduard's estate, where Eduard indulges his hobby of landscaping the grounds. The relationship between the two is more of familiarity than of passion. The contemplative togetherness is interrupted when — after Charlotte's initial misgivings — two guests are brought into the household: Eduard's friend, Captain Otto, who is in straitened circumstances, and Charlotte's niece, Ottilie, bereft of both parents and money.

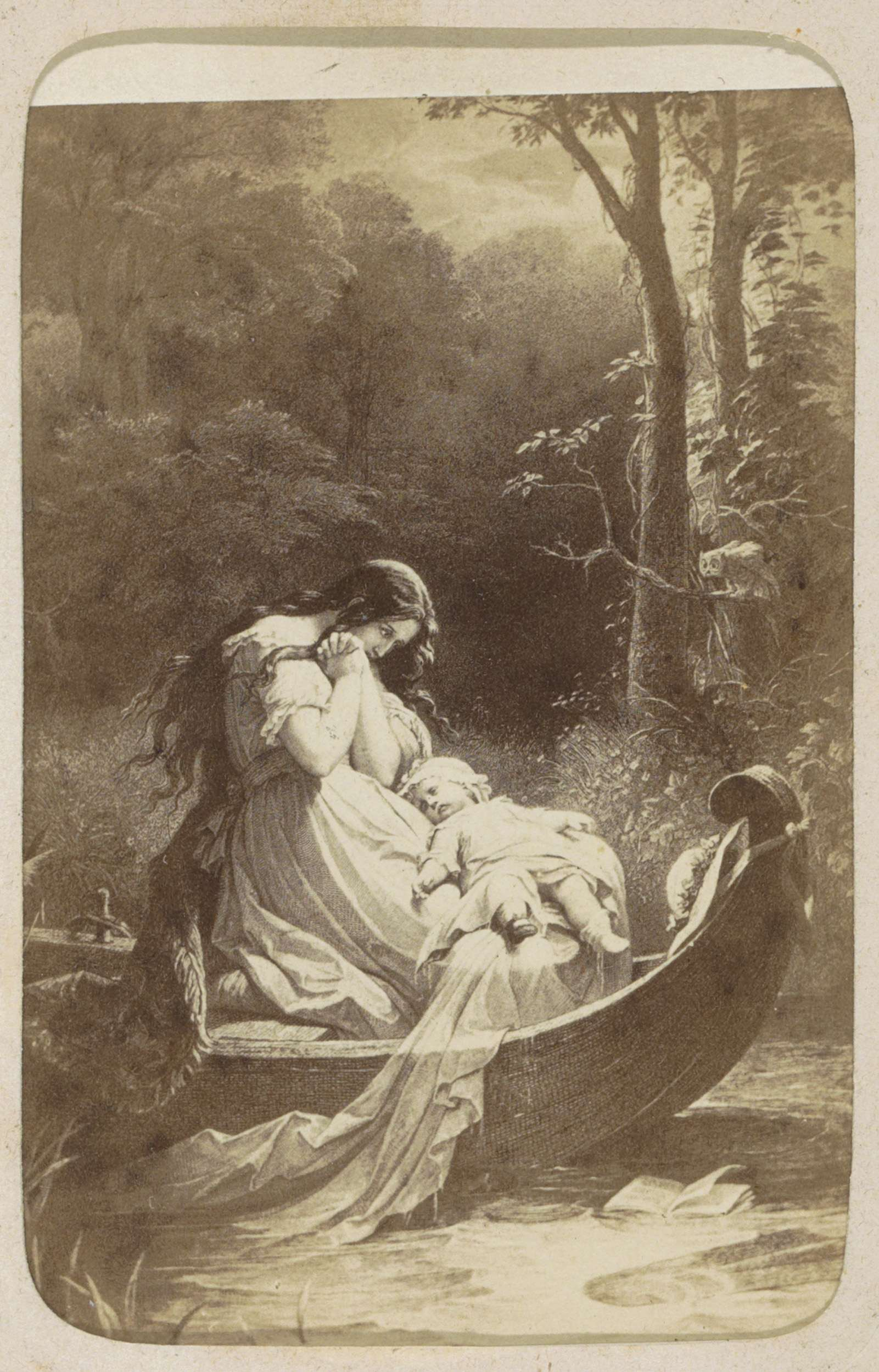
Wilhelm von Kaulbach's illustration of Goethe's Elective Affinities: Ottilie with Charlotte's son

The captain's considerable knowledge and drive motivates a range of improvements to the estate, especially the landscape architecture; Charlotte supports him in this. The young Ottilie is shy, taciturn, empathetic and peaceful, and Charlotte instructs her in household management, a task she soon takes over completely. Gradually, Eduard and Ottilie feel more and more drawn to each other, as do Charlotte and Captain Otto as well. Charlotte and Otto confess their love for each other, but Charlotte asks him to renounce such feelings. Eduard, however, cannot control his lust for Ottilie.

Charlotte, hoping for a return to the status quo ante, asks Eduard to make Ottilie leave; Eduard, however, had anticipated the possibility of a divorce from Charlotte, thinking that she had formed a bond with the captain. Captain Otto leaves the house, and in order to delay giving up Ottilie, Eduard moves away. Left behind, the two women try to carry on with their usual lives, hiring a young architect to continue the landscaping duties. In Eduard's absence, Charlotte finds out that she is pregnant and hopes that Eduard will now return to her, but he is disturbed by the news and resumes his military career. Ottilie, feeling hopeless because of Charlotte's pregnancy, becomes more withdrawn.

=== Part 2 ===
The beautification work now extends to the village cemetery and the associated church. Ottilie helps the architect with the painting of a side chapel, and Charlotte gives birth to a son, who strongly resembles Otto and, of course, her niece Ottilie — the result, we are told, of the double “spiritual adultery” from which the child arose. Ottilie takes on the child care duties. At this point, Goethe interposes a novella within the framing main story, depicting similar events that resulted in an eventual happy marriage.

After a year's absence, Eduard returns from the war with medals and honours. He invites the captain, now promoted to major, to his house and tries to facilitate a divorce from Charlotte so that she can live with Major Otto and their child on the estate, while Eduard himself can go on a journey with his mistress. On the bank of a lake created by the architect, he meets Ottilie with the child; they hug each other and experience direct, physical passion for the first time. Feeling assured of a divorce from Charlotte, Eduard presents his plans to his beloved; Ottilie leaves the decision to Charlotte. Wanting to row home across the lake and excited by having met Eduard again, she lets the child slip into the water and drown as she climbs onto the boat.

Charlotte, blaming her own hesitation for the accident, finally agrees to a divorce but does not give a definite answer to the major. With the death of the child, Eduard sees the last obstacle to a connection with Ottilie removed, but Ottilie is wracked by guilt and wants to renounce her love. After Eduard manoeuvres her into another meeting, she realizes that their mutual attraction is insurmountable. She stops speaking and eating and dies; Eduard, too, loses his will to live and also dies. Charlotte buries him beside his lover in the chapel that Ottilie had painted.

== Theory ==
Elective Affinities is supposed to be the first work to model human relationships as chemical reactions or chemical processes since the aphorism of the classical Greek philosopher Empedocles: "people who love each other mix like water and wine; people who hate each other segregate like water and oil."

The term "elective affinities" is based on the older notion of chemical affinities. In early nineteenth century chemistry, the phrase "elective affinities" or chemical affinities was used to describe compounds that only interacted with each other under select circumstances. Goethe used this as an organizing metaphor for marriage, and for the conflict between responsibility and passion.

In the book, people are described as chemical species whose amorous affairs and relationships were pre-determined via chemical affinities similar to the pairings of alchemical species. Goethe outlined the view that passion, marriage, conflict, and free will are all subject to the laws of chemistry and in which the lives of human species are regulated no differently from the lives of chemical species. Opinions over the years have been split as to whether Goethe's theory was used in metaphor.

In the novella, the central chemical reaction that takes place is a double displacement reaction (double elective affinity), between a married couple Eduard and Charlotte (BA), at the end of their first year of marriage (for each their second marriage), and their two good friends the Captain and Ottilie (CD), respectively. The first marriages, for both Eduard and Charlotte, are described as having been marriages of financial convenience, essentially arranged marriages. Specifically, when they were younger, Eduard was married off to a rich older woman through the workings and insatiable greed of his father; Charlotte, likewise, when her prospects were none the best, was compelled or obliged to marry a wealthy man, whom she did not love.

In the fourth chapter, the characters detail the world's first ever verbally-depicted human double displacement chemical reaction. The chapter begins with description of the affinity map (reaction map) or 'topographical chart' as Goethe calls it. On this reaction map, we are told that on it 'the features of the estate and its surroundings were clearly depicted, on quite a large scale, in pen and in different colors, to which the Captain had give a firm basis by taking trigonometrical measurements'.

Next, to explain the reaction, we are told:

'provided it does not seem pedantic,' the Captain said, 'I think I can briefly sum up in the language of signs. Imagine an A intimately united with a B, so that no force is able to sunder them; imagine a C likewise related to a D; now bring the two couples into contact: A will throw itself at D, C at B, without our being able to say which first deserted its partner, which first embraced the other's partner.' This is shown below:

AB + CD → AD + BC

'Now then!' Eduard interposed: 'until we see all this with our own eyes, let us look on this formula as a metaphor from which we may extract a lesson we can apply immediately to ourselves. You, Charlotte, represent the A, and I represent your B; for in fact I do depend altogether on you and follow you as A is followed by B. The C is quite obviously the Captain, who for the moment is to some extent drawing me away from you. Now it is only fair that, if you are not to vanish into the limitless air, you must be provided with a D, and this D is unquestionably the charming little lady Ottilie, whose approaching presence you may no longer resist.'

== Noted critical reactions ==
=== Astrida Tantillo ===
In her 2001 book Goethe's Elective Affinities and the Critics, she writes:

From the time of its publication to today, Goethe's novel, Die Wahlverwandtschaften (Elective Affinities, 1809), has aroused a storm of interpretive confusion. Readers fiercely debate the role of the chemical theory of elective affinities presented in the novel. Some argue that it suggests a philosophy of nature that is rooted in fate. Others maintain that it is about free choice. Others believe that the chemical theory is merely a structural device that allows the author to foreshadow events in the novel and bears no relevance to the greater issues of the novel.

== Adaptations ==
A 1974 East German film with the same title was directed by Siegfried Kühn for the DEFA film studio.

Francis Ford Coppola, in the grip of clinical manic depression and anxiety over his incomplete opus Apocalypse Now, and while purportedly under the influence of his girlfriend, screenwriter Melissa Mathison, proposed making a "ten-hour film version of Goethe's Elective Affinities, in 3D".

John Banville's 1982 novel The Newton Letter adapts the story to Ireland. A description by Gordon Burgess can be found in German life and letters, April 1992.

The films Diary (1975) and Tarot (1986) by Rudolf Thome are loosely based on Elective Affinities.

The 1993 play Arcadia, by British playwright Tom Stoppard, is a modern-day remake of Elective Affinities, albeit with a twist. The play takes place in modern times and 1809, Goethe's time; characters are replaced subtly, e.g. 'The Captain' becomes 'The Naval Captain'; and the chemical affinity becomes updated in the play with discussion on the second law of thermodynamics, chaos theory, and other subjects; albeit the play still holds to the idea that the characters are reactive entities, discussing ideas such as the "heat" of interactions between the characters.

Robin Gordon's 1995 short story "Leaves in the Wind" adapts the story to modern England, with Edward and Charlotte as an academic couple.

In 1996, a film version was made, entitled The Elective Affinities, directed by Paolo and Vittorio Taviani.

The 2009 film Sometime in August directed by Sebastian Schipper is loosely based on Goethe's novel and transposes the story to modern-day Germany.

== References in culture and theory ==
- The late 19th century sociologist Max Weber, who offered a way to describe the development of capitalism that distinguished itself from the theories of Karl Marx, described the rise of capitalism in terms of a number of social, cultural, and historical elective affinities or links between ideas rather than purely in terms of economic material, most notably in the Protestant Work Ethic. Weber had read the works of Goethe at the age of 14; he used Goethe's conception of human "elective affinities" to formulate a large part of sociology.
- Walter Benjamin wrote an essay entitled "Goethe's Elective Affinities". Published in Neue Deutsche Beiträge in 1924. It is one of his important early essays on German Romanticism.
- In 1933, René Magritte executed a painting entitled Elective Affinities.
- In French New Wave director François Truffaut's 1962 movie Jules et Jim, one of the two male characters, Jim, who is visiting his friend Jules, is lent the book, but Jules' wife, Catherine, suddenly asks him to return it. She then becomes Jim's lover.
- In Michael Ondaatje's novel, Anil's Ghost, the book is discussed as being placed with other novels in the doctors' common room of a Sri Lankan hospital, but remaining unread.
- In Günter Grass's first novel The Tin Drum, Elective Affinities is one of the two books which the central character Oskar uses for guidance, along with a book on Rasputin.
- In Maurice Baring’s novel Cat’s Cradle (Heineman, 1925) Elsie Lawless drolly and accurately comments (in relation to the attractions for Walter and Bernard to women other than their wives) “Quite a case of ‘elective affinities’, isn’t it?” The scene occurs in 1901 just after the Coronation of King Edward VII.
- In season 1 episode 4 the 2019 TV show Dark, the plot structure of the book is discussed in a classroom setting, foreshadowing the plot structure of the show.
