= Just a Matter of Duty =

1993 film

- Directed by: Thomas Mitscherlich
- Written by: Detlef Michel
- Produced by: Elke Peters
- Starring: Katharina Thalbach
- Cinematography: Thomas Mauch
- Edited by: Margot Neubert-Maric
- Release date: 6 May 1993
- Running time: 95 minutes
- Country: Germany
- Language: German

Just a Matter of Duty (German: Die Denunziantin) is a 1993 German drama film directed by Thomas Mitscherlich, about a German war crimes trial following World War II. It was entered into the 43rd Berlin International Film Festival.

== Cast ==
In alphabetical order

- Marquard Bohm as Jean Blome / Hans Blome
- Traugott Buhre as Direktor der Dresdner Bank
- Andreina de Martin as Lisbeth Schwaerzel
- Christoph Eichhorn as Photographer
- Peter Fitz as Anwalt
- Burghart Klaußner as Werner Kraengel
- Richy Müller as Walter Bethke
- Karin Nennemann
- Dieter Schaad as Carl Friedrich Goerdeler
- Doris Schade as Psychiaterin
- Tana Schanzara as Mutter Schwärzel
- Elisabeth Schwarz as Anneliese Goerdeler
- Katharina Thalbach as Helene Schwaerzel
- Markus Voellenklee
- Karl-Heinz von Hassel as Direktor der Deutschen Bank
- Christine Zierl as Elisabeth Bethke
- Hanns Zischler as Investigator
