= The Expulsion from Paradise =

1977 film

- Directed by: Niklaus Schilling
- Written by: Niklaus Schilling
- Produced by: Elke Haltaufderheide; Manfred Korytowski
- Starring: Herb Andress
- Cinematography: Ingo Hamer
- Edited by: Niklaus Schilling
- Release date: 28 October 1977
- Running time: 119 minutes
- Country: West Germany
- Language: German

The Expulsion from Paradise (German: Die Vertreibung aus dem Paradies) is a 1977 West German comedy-drama film directed by Niklaus Schilling. It was entered into the 27th Berlin International Film Festival.

== Cast ==
- Herb Andress as Andy Paulisch
- Elke Haltaufderheide as Astrid Paulisch
- Ksenija Protic as Countess
- Jochen Busse as Berens
- Andrea Rau as Evi Hollauer
- Herbert Fux as Cinematographer
- Elisabeth Bertram as Mother
- Georg Tryphon as Film Producer
- Trude Breitschopf as Kundin
- Harry Raymon
- Werner Abrolat as Film Director
- Dieter Brammer as Besetzungschef
- Hans-Jürgen Leuthen
- Gert Wiedenhofen as Pfarrer
- Heinz Baues von der Forst as Grenzbeamter
