= Peter Berling =

German actor, film producer and writer

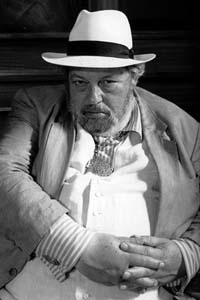
- Peter Berling in 1996
- Born: 20 March 1934; Meseritz-Obrawalde, Posen-West Prussia, Germany
- Died: 21 November 2017 (aged 83); Rome, Italy
- Occupations: Actor, film producer and writer

Peter Berling (20 March 1934 – 21 November 2017) was a German actor, film producer, and writer. He has worked on several occasions with director Werner Herzog, among them his collaborations with actor Klaus Kinski like Aguirre, the Wrath of God; Fitzcarraldo, and Cobra Verde.

In several of his medieval novels, Berling has drawn on conspiracy theories based on the Priory of Sion.

Berling died on 21 November 2017 in Rome, aged 83.

== Films ==
- Immer wenn der Tag beginnt (1957) - (uncredited)
- Der Brief (1966)
- Detectives (1969) - Möbelpacker (uncredited)
- Love Is Colder Than Death (1969) - Illegaler Waffenhändler
- Uxmal (1969) - World Manager
- A Big Grey-Blue Bird (1970) - (uncredited)
- Red Sun (1970) - Mercedesfahrer
- Niklashauser Fart (1970) - Executioner
- The Long Swift Sword of Siegfried (1971) - Hansel
- Whity (1971) - The Hefty Bartender (uncredited)
- Furchtlose Flieger (1971) - Berlinger
- Beware of a Holy Whore (1971)
- Faire l'amour : De la pilule à l'ordinateur (1971) - Mike
- Il sergente Klems (1971) - Sergeant Bogdanowitsch
- Terror Desire (1971)
- When Women Were Called Virgins (1972) - Romildo Varrone
- Return of Halleluja (1972) - Lt. Schultz
- The Italian Connection (1972) - Damiano
- Aguirre, the Wrath of God (1972) - Don Fernando de Guzman
- Dirty Weekend (1973) - German tourist
- Revolver (1973) - Grappa
- The Three Musketeers of the West (1973) - Hans
- Es knallt – und die Engel singen (1974) - China-Joe
- Julia (1974) - Uncle Alex
- The Loves and Times of Scaramouche (1976) - (uncredited)
- Victory March (1976)
- Black and White in Color (1976) - Père Jean de la Croix
- Meet Him and Die (1976) - Bavoso
- Mister Scarface (1976) - Valentino
- Young, Violent, Dangerous (1976) - Oberwald
- Maladolescenza (1977, writer)
- Good-for-Nothing (1978) - Maler
- The Marriage of Maria Braun (1978) - Bronski (as Berling)
- Red Rings of Fear (1978) - Bit Part
- Theo Against the Rest of the World (1980) - Doppel-Dieter
- Veronika Voss (1982) - Filmproduzent / Dicker Mann
- Fitzcarraldo (1982) - Opera Manager
- An Ideal Adventure (1982) - Brian De Pino
- Petomaniac (1983) - Ziedler
- Dagger Eyes (1983) - Reinhardt
- The Two Lives of Mattia Pascal (1985) - Aristide Melainassis
- Tex and the Lord of the Deep (1985) - El Morisco
- The Mines of Kilimanjaro (1986) - Mr. Urdos
- The Name of the Rose (1986) - Jean d'Anneaux
- Cobra Verde (1987) - Bernabé
- The Last Temptation of Christ (1988) - Beggar
- Haunted Summer (1988) - Maurice
- Francesco (1989) - Bishop Guido
- Visioni private (1989) - Petronius
- The Voyager (1991) - Baptist
- Texas – Doc Snyder hält die Welt in Atem (1993) - Hank Snyder
- Sátántangó (1994) - Orvos
- Tykho Moon (1996)
- Praxis Dr. Hasenbein (1997) - Peterchen
- Semana santa (2002) - Castenada
- Gangs of New York (2002) - Knife Act Caller
- Half Brothers (2015) - Hein

== Novels ==
- Berling, Peter (1993). Franziskus, oder, Das zweite Memorandum : aus den geheimen Aufzeichnungen des Guido II., Bischof von Assisi (in German). Bergisch Gladbach: G. Lübbe. ISBN 978-3-404-11956-1. OCLC 1280750960.
- Berling, Peter (2001). Die Ketzerin Roman (in German). Bergisch Gladbach. ISBN 978-3-404-14627-7. OCLC 722777653.
- Berling, Peter (2002). Zodiak : die Geschichte der Astrologie; Elemente, Symbole und Hintergründe von den Anfängen bis in die Gegenwart (in German). Berlin: Ullstein. ISBN 3-550-07536-7. OCLC 52944048.
- Berling, Peter (2002). Das Kreuz der Kinder : Roman (in German). München: Ullstein. ISBN 3-550-08404-8. OCLC 54440640.
- Die Kinder des Gral (The Children of the Grail) series:
  - Berling, Peter (1991). Die Kinder des Gral [The Children of the Grail] (in German). Germany: Bastei Lubbe. ISBN 978-3-404-12060-4. OCLC 1033643503.
  - Berling, Peter (1993). Das Blut der Könige [Blood of Kings] (in German) (Ungekürzte Taschenbuchausg ed.). Bergisch Gladbach: Lübbe. ISBN 978-3404123681.
  - Berling, Peter (1995). Die Krone der Welt [The Crown of the World] (in German). Bergish Gladbach: Bastei Lübbe. ISBN 978-3404126347.
  - Berling, Peter (1997). Der schwarze Kelch [The Black Chalice] (in German). Bergish Gladbach: Bastei Lübbe. ISBN 978-3404142620.
  - Berling, Peter (2004). Der Kelim der Prinzessin [The Kilim of the Princess] (in German). Bergisch Gladbach: Lübbe. ISBN 978-3785721933.
