= Love Is as Beautiful as Love =

1971 film

- Directed by: Klaus Lemke
- Written by: Klaus Lemke
- Produced by: Klaus Lemke
- Starring: Sylvie Winter; Rolf Zacher; Marquard Bohm
- Cinematography: Bernd Fiedler
- Edited by: Peter Przygodda
- Production company: Silvana Film
- Distributed by: Silvana Film
- Release date: 2 September 1971
- Running time: 95 minutes
- Country: West Germany
- Language: German

Love Is as Beautiful as Love (German: Liebe, so schön wie Liebe) is a 1971 West German comedy film directed by Klaus Lemke and starring Sylvie Winter, Rolf Zacher and Marquard Bohm. Location shooting took place around Munich. It is part of the New German Cinema movement. It premiered at the 1971 Venice Film Festival but didn't go on general release in West Germany until the following year.

== Main cast ==
- Sylvie Winter as Sylvie
- Rolf Zacher as Rolf
- Marquard Bohm as Herr Marquard
- Isolde Nist as Isolde
- Bernd Redecker as Bernd
- Renate Zimmermann as Renate
- Dietrich Kerky as Dietrich

== Bibliography ==
- Abel, Marco & Fisher, Jaimey (ed.) New German Cinema and Its Global Contexts: A Transnational Art Cinema. Wayne State University Press, 2025.
- Gerhardt, Christina & Abel, Marco. Celluloid Revolt: German Screen Cultures and the Long 1968. Camden House, 2019.
