= Rhinegold (1978 film) =

1978 film

- Directed by: Niklaus Schilling
- Written by: Niklaus Schilling
- Produced by: Elke Haltaufderheide
- Starring: Elke Haltaufderheide
- Cinematography: Ernst Wild
- Edited by: Angelika Gruber
- Release date: 6 October 1978
- Running time: 91 minutes
- Country: West Germany
- Language: German

Rhinegold (German: Rheingold) is a 1978 West German drama film directed by Niklaus Schilling. It was entered into the 28th Berlin International Film Festival.

== Cast ==
- Elke Haltaufderheide – Elisabeth Drossbach
- Rüdiger Kirschstein – Wolfgang Friedrichs
- Gunther Malzacher – Karl-Heinz Drossbach
- Alice Treff – Mutter
- Reinfried Keilich – Erfinder
- Alfred Baarovy – Astrologe
- Petra Maria Grühn – Junge Frau
- Franz Zimmermann – Großvater
- Ulrike Quien – Enkelin

== See also ==
- Rheingold (train)
