= Detectives (1969 film) =

- Directed by: Rudolf Thome
- Written by: Max Zihlmann
- Produced by: Carol Hellman; Rudolf Thome
- Starring: Ulli Lommel; Marquard Bohm; Uschi Obermaier
- Cinematography: Hubertus Hagen; Niklaus Schilling
- Edited by: Jutta Brandstaedter
- Music by: Kristian Schultze
- Production company: Eichberg-Film
- Distributed by: Cinema Service
- Release date: 23 May 1969
- Running time: 91 minutes
- Country: West Germany
- Language: German

Detectives (German: Detektive) is a 1969 West German crime film directed by Rudolf Thome and starring Ulli Lommel, Marquard Bohm and Uschi Obermaier. It was shot at the Bavaria Studios in Munich and on location around the city. The film was shot during the middle of 1968, but was not given a general release until the following year.

== Cast ==
- Ulli Lommel as Sebastian West
- Marquard Bohm as Andy Schubert
- Uschi Obermaier as Mickys
- Elke Haltaufderheide as Christa
- Iris Berben as Annabella Quant
- Peter Moland as Bussen
- Dieter Busch as Reiniger
- Florian Obermaier as Kind Florian
- Walter Rilla as Krüger
- Peter Berling as Möbelpacker
- Eberhard Maier as Möbelpacker
- Rosl Mayr as Wirtin
- Max Zihlmann as Gast im Café

== Bibliography ==
- Bock, Hans-Michael & Bergfelder, Tim. The Concise Cinegraph: Encyclopaedia of German Cinema. Berghahn Books, 2009.
