= Ayse Romey =

American-born actress

Ayse Romey is an American-born actress. She starred in two German-Turkish films, Mavi Surgun and Yasemin.

She and her mother Birsel obtained a provisional order to prohibit the sale of Maxim Biller's novel "Esra", which was later confirmed by the German Federal Court, because they claimed to have seen themselves reflected in characters in the book. This verdict caused an outcry in the German public regarding the freedom of the arts (2007).

== Awards ==
- 1989: Bavarian Film Award "Best Young Actress" for Yasemin
- 1989: Deutscher Filmpreis "Best Actress" for Yasemin
