= Eine deutsche Revolution =

1982 film

- Directed by: Helmut Herbst
- Written by: Kasimir Edschmid (novel); Helmut Herbst
- Produced by: Helmut Herbst
- Starring: Gregor Hansen; Franz Wittich
- Cinematography: Henning Zick
- Edited by: Renate Merck
- Release date: 1982
- Running time: 97 minutes
- Country: West Germany
- Language: German

Eine deutsche Revolution is a 1982 West German drama film directed by Helmut Herbst. It was entered into the 32nd Berlin International Film Festival.

== Cast ==
- Gregor Hansen as Georg Büchner
- Franz Wittich as Friedrich Ludwig Weidig
- Emanuel Schmied as Hofrat Georgi
- Marquard Bohm as Preuninger, prison guard
- Eike Gallwitz as Kuhl
- Wolfram Weniger as Hofrat Schiffer
- Heidi Speisser as Minni
- Brunhild Geipel as Amalie Weidig

In alphabetical order

- Bazon Brock as Hofrat von Stein
- Peter O. Chotjewitz as Gravellinus
- Peter Döring
- Jörg Falkenstein as Zeuner
- Ernst A. Hartung as Dr. Stegmayer
- Egon Hofmann as Minnigerode
- Christel Merian
- Siegfried Unruh as Scharmann
