= Forty Eight Hours to Acapulco =

- Directed by: Klaus Lemke
- Written by: Max Zihlmann
- Produced by: Joseph Kommer; Dieter Geissler
- Starring: Dieter Geissler; Christiane Krüger; Monika Zinnenberg
- Cinematography: Hubertus Hagen; Niklaus Schilling
- Edited by: Wolfgang Limmer
- Music by: Roland Kovac
- Production company: Seven Star Film
- Distributed by: Cinema Service
- Release date: 30 November 1967
- Running time: 81 minutes
- Country: West Germany
- Language: German

Forty Eight Hours to Acapulco (German: 48 Stunden bis Acapulco) is a 1967 West German crime film directed by Klaus Lemke and starring Dieter Geissler, Christiane Krüger and Monika Zinnenberg. Location shooting took place in Bavaria, Italy and Mexico.

== Cast ==
- Dieter Geissler as Frank Murnau
- Christiane Krüger as Laura Gruner
- Monika Zinnenberg as Monika
- Alexander Kerst as Vater Gruner
- Charly Kommer as Amerikanischer Gangster
- Manuel Rivera
- Lyn Guild as Dienstmädchen bei Mr. Wayne
- Lucas Hernandez
- Roberto Lopez
- Ilse Pagé as Mädchen auf Gruners Party
- Michael Maien as Monikas Tischnachbar
- Teddy Stauffer as Mr. Wayne
- Roland Carey as Mr. Cameron
- Gideon Bachmann as Mann an der Bar in Rom
- Elke Haltaufderheide
- Rudolf Thome as Angreifer

== Bibliography ==
- Bock, Hans-Michael & Bergfelder, Tim. The Concise Cinegraph: Encyclopaedia of German Cinema. Berghahn Books, 2009.
