= Red Sun (1970 film) =

1970 film by Rudolf Thome

- Theatrical release poster
- German: Rote Sonne
- Directed by: Rudolf Thome
- Written by: Max Zihlmann
- Produced by: Heinz Angermeyer; Rudolf Thome
- Starring: Marquard Bohm; Uschi Obermaier; Diana Körner; Sylvia Kekulé; Gaby Go
- Cinematography: Bernd Fiedler
- Edited by: Jutta Brandstaedter
- Music by: Jean Sibelius (extracts)
- Production company: Independent Film
- Distributed by: Alpha Films
- Release date: 1 September 1970 (West Germany)
- Running time: 89 minutes
- Country: West Germany
- Language: German

Red Sun (German: Rote Sonne) is a 1970 West German thriller film directed by Rudolf Thome and starring Marquard Bohm, Uschi Obermaier, Diana Körner, Sylvia Kekulé and Gaby Go.

== Synopsis ==
Four German women decide to murder every man they meet and spend more than a few days with. But when Peggy lets her boyfriend live a few days longer, he starts to figure out what is going on, leading to a tragic conclusion.

== Cast ==
- Uschi Obermaier as Peggy
- Marquard Bohm as Thomas
- Sylvia Kekulé as Sylvie
- Gaby Go as Isolde
- Diana Körner as Christine
- Peter Moland as Wenders
- Don Wahl as Howard
- Hark Bohm as Linker student
- Henry van Lyck as Lohmann
- Günter Lemmer as manager
- Axel Willschrei as writer
- Wolfgang Glück as Mercedes driver
- Peter Berling as Mercedes driver
- Elga Sorbas as dancing girl
- Carlo Fedier as man at the bar
