= Departure from the Northern Wasteland =

Studio album by Michael Hoenig
- Released: 1978
- Recorded: Aura Studio, Berlin
- Genres: Electronic, progressive electronic
- Length: 42:24
- Label: Warner Bros.
- Producer: Michael Hoenig

Michael Hoenig chronology
Departure from the Northern Wasteland (1978)	Xcept One (1987)

Professional ratings
Review scores
Source	Rating
Allmusic	5/5 stars

Departure from the Northern Wasteland is the debut studio album of electronic music composer Michael Hoenig, released in 1978 by Warner Bros. Records.

== Music ==
The music on Departure from the Northern Wasteland is repetitive. The sequencer is used as a "compositional tool," according to AllMusic. The album draws influence from minimalist composers such as Philip Glass, Steve Reich, and Terry Riley.

== Reception ==
AllMusic said the album was "a classic of the progressive electronic genre," giving it a perfect score.

== Track listing ==
All music is composed by Michael Hoenig except for "Sun & Moon" by Michael Hoenig & Mickie D aka Michael Duwe.

Side one
No.	Title	Length
1.	"Departure From the Northern Wasteland"	20:53

Side two
No.	Title	Length
1.	"Hanging Garden Transfer"	10:56
2.	"Voices of Where"	6:19
3.	"Sun and Moon"	4:16

== Personnel ==
Adapted from the Departure from the Northern Wasteland liner notes.

Musicians

- Michael Duwe – keyboards (B3)
- Michael Hoenig – instruments, production, mixing, recording
- Uschi Obermaier – voice (A)
- Lutz Ulbrich – double guitar (A)

Production and additional personnel

- Arnie Acosta – mastering
- John Cabalka – art direction
- Dennis G. Hendricks – illustrations
- Jutta Henglein – photography
- Dave Hutchins – mixing
- Conny Plank – mixing

== Release history ==
Region	Date	Label	Format	Catalog
United States	1978	Warner Bros.	LP	BSK 3152
Germany	1987	Kuckuck	CD	KUCK 079
