= Diary (1975 film) =

1975 film directed by Rudolf Thome

- Directed by: Rudolf Thome
- Screenplay by: Rudolf Thome
- Based on: Elective Affinities by Johann Wolfgang von Goethe
- Produced by: Rudolf Thome
- Cinematography: Martin Schäfer
- Edited by: Clarissa Ambach
- Production company: Rudolf Thome Produktionsgesellschaft
- Release dates: 2 July 1975 (Berlinale); 3 July 1975
- Running time: 147 minutes
- Country: West Germany
- Language: German

Diary (German: Tagebuch) is a 1975 West German drama film directed by Rudolf Thome. It is very loosely based on the novel Elective Affinities by Johann Wolfgang von Goethe, moved to contemporary times and set in a Berlin apartment.

The film is in black-and-white and was made without any conventional screenplay. Like Thome's previous film Made in Germany and USA (1974), it was made according to his theory of "documentary film with acting" (German: dokumentarischen Spielfilm). Filming took place in Berlin in March and April 1975.

The film premiered at the 25th Berlin International Film Festival on 2 July 1975, playing in the section Internationales Forum des Jungen Films. It was released in West German cinemas on 3 July 1975. Der Spiegel described it as part of an ongoing "wave of semi-documentary films about marriage and partner problems", grouping it with The Mother and the Whore, Pleasure Party and Scenes from a Marriage.

== Cast ==
- Angelika Kettelhack as Charlotte
- Cynthia Beatt as Ottilie
- Rudolf Thome as Eduard
- Holger Henze as Otto
- Eberhard Maier as construction worker
- Michael Geissler as Porsche buyer
- Carmen Geissler as Porsche buyer
- Alexander Malkowsky as Brockmann
