= Moritz, Dear Moritz =

1978 film

- Film poster
- Directed by: Hark Bohm
- Written by: Hark Bohm
- Produced by: Hark Bohm
- Starring: Michael Kebschull
- Cinematography: Wolfgang Treu
- Edited by: Jane Seitz
- Music by: Klaus Doldinger
- Release date: February 1978
- Running time: 96 minutes
- Country: West Germany
- Language: German

Moritz, Dear Moritz (German: Moritz, lieber Moritz) is a 1978 West German drama film directed by Hark Bohm. It was entered into the 28th Berlin International Film Festival.

== Cast ==
- Michael Kebschull as Moritz Stuckmann
- Kyra Mladeck as Mother Stuckmann
- Walter Klosterfelde as Dad Stuckmann
- Elvira Thom as Aunt
- Kerstin Wehlmann as Barbara
- Uwe Bohm as Uwe (as Uwe Enkelmann)
- Dschingis Bowakow as Dschingis
- Grete Mosheim as Grandmother
- Uwe Dallmeier as cantor
- Marquard Bohm as Barbara's father
- Hark Bohm as doctor
- Armand Hacaturyan as bassist
- Nico Lafrenz as drummer
- Richard Schumacher as guitar player
- Eva Fiebig as widow
- Christa Siems as caretaker
