= Christiane Krüger =

German actress (born 1945)

- Born: Christiane Krüger; 8 September 1945 (age 81); Hamburg, Germany
- Years active: 1967-2013
- Website: agentur-lentz-reinholz.de

Christiane Krüger (born 8 September 1945 in Hamburg, Germany) is a German actress. She is the daughter of actor Hardy Krüger.

== Selected filmography ==
=== Cinema ===
- Forty Eight Hours to Acapulco (1967)
- The Man with the Glass Eye (1969)
- Das Gesicht im Dunkeln (Double Face, 1969)
- De Sade (1969)
- Lovemaker (1969)
- Fluchtweg St. Pauli – Großalarm für die Davidswache (Jailbreak in Hamburg, 1971)
- Little Mother (1973)
- The Internecine Project (1974)
- Auch ich war nur ein mittelmäßiger Schüler (1974)
- Salut, j'arrive (1982)
- Le Dernier Combat (1983)
- Eine Frau für gewisse Stunden (1985)
- Strictement personnel (1985)
- Alles Bob! (1999)

=== Television ===
- 11 Uhr 20 (1970)
- Star Maidens (1976, science fiction series)
- Les Brigades du Tigre - Season 3, Episode 3: "Don de Scotland Yard" (1976)
- Es muss nicht immer Kaviar sein (1977)
- Golden Soak (1979)
- Derrick - Season 7, Episode 6: "Die Entscheidung" (1980)
- Derrick - Season 7, Episode 9: "Zeuge Yuroski" (1980)
- Arsène Lupin joue et perd (1980)
- Derrick - Season 8, Episode 10: "Tod im See" (1981)
- Derrick - Season 10, Episode 2: "Die Tote in der Isar" (1983)
- Derrick - Season 10, Episode 7: "Lohmanns innerer Frieden" (1983)
- Derrick - Season 12, Episode 7: "Ein unheimlicher Abgang" (1985)
- Anne of Green Gables (1985)
- Derrick - "Eine Endstation" (1994)
- Der Mann ohne Schatten - "Die Entführung" (1996)
- The Lost Daughter (1997)
- Derrick - "Der Entscheider" (1996)
- Ich schenk dir meinen Mann 2 (2001)
- Unser Charly - "Retter in der Not" (2006)
- SOKO 5113 - "Spurwechsel" (2006)

=== Theatre ===
- Munich Kammerspiele
- Residenz Theatre Munich
- Salzburger Festspiele
