= Goodbye Berlin =

2016 film by Fatih Akın

- German: Tschick
- Directed by: Fatih Akın
- Written by: Lars Hubrich, Hark Bohm, Fatih Akin
- Produced by: Marco Mehlitz
- Cinematography: Rainer Klausmann
- Edited by: Andrew Bird
- Music by: Vince Pope
- Production company: Lago Film
- Distributed by: StudioCanal
- Release dates: 12 September 2016 (World premiere); 15 September 2016 (Germany)
- Running time: 93 minutes
- Country: Germany
- Language: German

Goodbye Berlin (German: Tschick [tʃɪk]) is a 2016 German comedy-drama film directed by Fatih Akın, based on Wolfgang Herrndorf's bestselling 2010 novel Tschick (released as Why We Took the Car in English-speaking countries). The film depicts two teenage outsiders from Berlin who steal a car and go on an eccentric road trip through Eastern Germany during the summer holidays. Goodbye Berlin received mostly positive reviews in Germany.

== Plot ==
14-year-old Maik faces a boring summer vacation – his mother in detox clinic, his father on a trip with his affair, and worst of all, Maik being the only one in class who’s not invited to his pretty classmate’s birthday party he is secretly in love with.

Then, Tschick (pronounced chick) turns up with a stolen car. Tschick (short for his last name Tschichatschow) is the second outsider in class, looking like a bully and disliked by everyone. Tschick manages to get Maik out of his dull mood, and they set off for an adventurous road trip through Eastern Germany. They have most different encounters, pick up the homeless girl Isa and become close friends.

The trip ends in a road accident with the boys badly injured. While Tschick runs away to avoid being put in an orphanage, Maik is taken by the police and sentenced to community service. When school starts again, he is aware this was the best vacation of his life after all.

== Cast ==
- Tristan Göbel as Maik Klingenberg
- Anand Batbileg as Andrej "Tschick" Tschichatschow
- Mercedes Müller as Isa Schmidt
- Aniya Wendel as Tatjana Cosic
- Anja Schneider as Maik's mother
- Uwe Bohm as Maik's father
- Xenia Assenza as Mona, father's secretary
- Udo Samel as Herr Wagenbach, teacher
- Claudia Geisler as Mother of child-rich family
- Marc Hosemann as village policeman
- Alexander Scheer as the judge
- Friederike Kempter as Maik's lawyer
