= Psychedelic Underground =

Studio album by Amon Düül
- Released: 1969
- Recorded: 1968–1969
- Genre: Progressive rock; psychedelic rock; space rock; experimental rock
- Label: Metronome Records
- Producer: Meisel-Produktion

Amon Düül chronology
Psychedelic Underground (1969)	Collapsing/Singvögel Rückwärts & Co. (1970)

Professional ratings
Review scores
Source	Rating
Allmusic	3/5 stars

Psychedelic Underground is the debut studio album by the German rock band Amon Düül released in 1969.

== Track listing ==
- All tracks written and arranged by Amon Düül.

Side one
No.	Title	Length
1.	"Ein Wunderhübsches Mädchen Träumt von Sandosa (A Wonderfully Pretty Girl Dreams of Sandosa)"	17:03
2.	"Kaskados Minnelied (The Cockatoo's Love Song)"	2:53
3.	"Mama Düül und ihre Sauerkrautband spielt auf (Mama Duul and her Sauerkraut Band Play On)"	2:54

Side two
No.	Title	Length
4.	"Im Garten Sandosa (In the Garden at Sandosa)"	7:48
5.	"Der Garten Sandosa im Morgentau (The Garden at Sandosa in the Morning Dew)"	8:06
6.	"Bitterlings Verwandlung (Bitterling's Transformation)"	2:31

== Personnel ==
- Rainer Bauer: electric and twelve-string guitars, vocals
- Ulrich Leopold: electric and acoustic basses
- Krischke: drums, piano
- Angelika Filanda: drums, vocals
- Ella Bauer: drums, percussion, vocals
- Uschi Obermaier: maracas
- Helge Filanda: congas, vocals

== Rerelease information ==
- Since its debut in 1969 on Metronome (and its concurrent Stateside release, the album has been re-issued a total of nine times. The list is as follows:
1. Metronome released the album again in 1973, calling it "This Is Amon Düül" (catalog number: 200 146)
2. Brain Records (Germany) called the album "Minnelied" and reissued it in 1979, with the catalog number 0040.149.
  - From then on, the various reissues would keep the original album title.
1. Captain Trip Records (Japan; catalog number CTCD-021) in 1995
2. Spalax Music (France; catalog number CD 14947) in 1996
3. Repertoire Records (Germany; catalog number REP 4616-WY) in 1997
4. Kekere Aquarium (catalog number KA 0-18) and 100% Recordings (catalog number 3%; both in Croatia) in 1998
5. Arcàngelo Records (Japan; catalog number ARC 7034) in 2003
6. Metronome re-issued the album two more times; once in 2009, and then again one year later (both with the catalog number MLP 15 332)
