= Claus Hant =

German writer

- Born: (Germany)
- Occupation: Writer
- Writing career
- Language: German, English
- Genres: Film, television, thriller, fiction, non-fiction

Claus Hant is a German writer, best known as the creator of Der Bulle von Tölz, a TV series that ran on prime time for over a decade and made German TV history with its audience figures. Hant's films have been nominated for the Adolf Grimme Awards and have been honoured with the Goldener Löwe/Deutscher Fernsehpreis, the Cadrage Succes, the Romy (TV award) and the Bavarian Film Awards.

Claus Hant has also written Young Hitler, a book about the formative years of the German dictator Adolf Hitler, published by Quartet Books, London.

== Film and television ==
- Eight Miles High (feature film, contributor)
- Der Bulle von Tölz (television series, seven episodes)
- The Day of the Cat (feature film starring Bruno Ganz, based on a novel by Thomas Hürlimann)
- The Robber Hotzenplotz (feature film)

== Thriller ==
- Affenschande, S. Fischer Verlag, Frankfurt am Main 2005 ISBN 978-3-502-11005-7
- Weltspartag, S. Fischer Verlag, Frankfurt am Main 2007.ISBN 978-3-502-11039-2

== Non-Fiction ==
- Young Hitler, Quartet Books, London 2010
- Das Drehbuch. Praktische Filmdramaturgie. Zweitausendeins, Frankfurt am Main 1999
- Hitler, Die wenig bekannten Fakten, Bookmundo, Rotterdamm, 2020, ISBN 978-9-40360-415-2
