= Xcept One =

Studio album by Michael Hoenig
- Released: 1987
- Recorded: Metamusic Productions, Los Angeles, CA
- Genre: Electronic
- Length: 36:33
- Label: Capitol
- Producer: Michael Hoenig

Michael Hoenig chronology
Departure from the Northern Wasteland (1978)	Xcept One (1987)	The Blob (1988)

Professional ratings
Review scores
Source	Rating
Allmusic	2/5 stars

Xcept One is the second album by composer Michael Hoenig, released in 1987 through Capitol Records.

== Track listing ==
All music is composed by Michael Hoenig, except where noted

No.	Title	Music	Length
1.	"Xcept One"		5:05
2.	"Bones on the Beach"	Ellis, Hoenig	6:04
3.	"Forgotten Thoughts"		7:16
4.	"Scatter Part I"		4:24
5.	"Spectral Gong"	Budd, Hoenig	7:10
6.	"Scatter Part III"		6:10

== Personnel ==
Musicians

- Harold Budd – Synclavier
- Brad Ellis – keyboards, Synclavier, mixing
- Michael Hoenig – Synclavier, synthesizers, production, mixing
- Ralph Humphrey – electronic drums

Production and additional personnel

- Roy Kohara – art direction
- Anne Miller – painting
- Michael Rockwell – engineering, mixing, programming
- Howard Rosenberg – photography
- Wally Traugott – mastering
- Roland Young – design, art direction
