= Yasemin =

1988 film

- Directed by: Hark Bohm
- Written by: Hark Bohm
- Produced by: Hark Bohm
- Starring: Ayse Romey
- Cinematography: Sławomir Idziak
- Edited by: Moune Barius
- Release date: 5 May 1988
- Running time: 85 minutes
- Countries: West Germany; Turkey
- Language: German

Yasemin is a 1988 German-language film directed by Hark Bohm. The international co-production of Turkey and West Germany was chosen as West Germany's official submission to the 61st Academy Awards for Best Foreign Language Film, but didn't obtain a nomination. It was also entered into the 38th Berlin International Film Festival.

== Plot ==
West Germany, 1988. Yasemin and Jan are in the same judo club. Yasemin is a modern young Turkish woman. Jan is an old-fashioned womaniser. When his friends bet he cannot have Yasemin he sees this as a welcome challenge. He plays his best tricks on Yasemin who eventually takes to him because she is led to believe he is no macho but a really modern nice guy. He feels ashamed to have approached her just to impress his friends. Unfortunately this truth is eventually disclosed to her, and when it is, he is dismayed by the harm he has done. Things are further complicated by her father's disapproval of their relationship.

== Cast ==
- Ayse Romey as Yasemin
- Uwe Bohm as Jan
- Şener Şen as father Yunuf
- Ilhan Emirli as Dursun
- Sevgi Özdamar as mother Dilber
- Toto Karaca as aunt Zeynep
- Sebnem Selduez as Nesrin
- Nursel Köse as Emine
- Katharina Lehmann as Susanne
- Nedim Hazar as Hassan
- Corinna Harfouch as teacher Rathjens
- Kaya Gürel as uncle Ibrahim
- Michael Gwisdek as father Eggers

== See also ==
- List of submissions to the 61st Academy Awards for Best Foreign Language Film
- List of German submissions for the Academy Award for Best Foreign Language Film
