= Tarot (1986 film) =

1986 film

- Directed by: Rudolf Thome
- Written by: Johann Wolfgang Goethe (novel); Max Zihlmann
- Starring: Vera Tschechowa
- Cinematography: Martin Schäfer
- Release date: 11 September 1986
- Running time: 120 minutes
- Country: West Germany
- Language: German

Tarot is a 1986 West German drama film directed by Rudolf Thome. It is loosely based on Johann Wolfgang von Goethe's 1809 novel Elective Affinities. It was entered into the 15th Moscow International Film Festival.

== Cast ==
- Vera Tschechowa as Charlotte
- Rüdiger Vogler as Otto
- Hanns Zischler as Eduard
- Katharina Böhm as Ottilie
- William Berger as Mittler
- Kerstin Eiblmeier as Nanni
- Martin Kern as Baby
- George Tabori as Theaterregisseur
- Willem Menne as Schauspieler (as Wilhelm Menne)
