= The Children of the Grail =

The Children of the Grail (German Die Kinder des Gral) is a German historical novel series, inspired by the legend of the Holy Grail, written by Peter Berling. The eponymous first installment was published in 1991.

- The Children of the Grail (1996) (Die Kinder des Gral, 1991)
- Blood of Kings (Das Blut der Könige, 1993)
- The Crown of the World (Die Krone der Welt, 1995)
- The Black Chalice (Der Schwarze Kelch, 1997)
- The Kelim of the Princess (Der Kelim der Prinzessin, 2004)
