= Thomas Mitscherlich =

German film director

- Born: 11 December 1942; Heidelberg, Germany
- Died: 18 March 1998 (aged 55); Hamburg, Germany
- Occupations: Film director, screenwriter
- Years active: 1972-1996

Thomas Mitscherlich (11 December 1942 – 18 March 1998) was a German film director and screenwriter. He directed ten films between 1972 and 1996. His 1993 film Just a Matter of Duty was entered into the 43rd Berlin International Film Festival.

== Selected filmography ==
- Just a Matter of Duty (1993)
- Journey Into Life: Aftermath of a Childhood in Auschwitz (1996)
