= Michael Hoenig =

German composer

- Born: 4 January 1952 (age 74); Hamburg, West Germany
- Genres: Electronic
- Occupations: Musician, songwriter
- Instrument: Synthesizer
- Years active: 1971–present
- Label: Warner Bros. Records
- Member of: Agitation Free
- Formerly of: Tangerine Dream

Michael Hoenig (born 4 January 1952) is a German composer who has composed music for several films and games, in addition to two solo albums, including the highly acclaimed 1978 album Departure from the Northern Wasteland. In 1997, he was nominated for a Primetime Emmy Award for Outstanding Main Title Theme Music for composing the theme to the science fiction series Dark Skies.

== Early career ==
As the editor of the underground magazine LOVE in the late sixties, Hoenig was part of the burgeoning progressive rock scene in Berlin, which fostered bands like Tangerine Dream, Ash Ra Tempel and Agitation Free. His interest in avant-garde music, sound generators and prepared tapes caught the eye of Michael Günther, the bassist of Agitation Free, and he joined the band in February 1971. In March 1975, Hoenig was hired to replace Peter Baumann in Tangerine Dream for an Australian tour and a London Royal Albert Hall concert, and subsequently left Agitation Free, which broke up shortly after. Baumann rejoined Tangerine Dream soon after, and Hoenig went on to collaborate with Klaus Schulze on the short-lived project "Timewind" (unrelated to the 1975 Schulze album of the same name). In 1976 he had a brief collaboration with Manuel Göttsching of Ash Ra Tempel; a recording of one of the sessions was released in 1995 under the title "Early Water". In 1977, he released his first solo album, the highly acclaimed Berlin School classic Departure from the Northern Wasteland, and left for Los Angeles shortly after it was released.

== Later career ==
Hoenig owns a recording studio in Los Angeles and through his company Metamusic Productions, he has composed the scores for several movies (see filmography below) and television shows. In addition to this, he has composed music for the extremely popular Baldur's Gate PC games by BioWare. In 1987, Hoenig released his second solo album, Xcept One. The track Bones on the Beach from the Xcept One album was installed in the roller coaster CHAOS at Opryland in Nashville, making the attraction the first roller coaster to be synced to music. Bones on the Beach has also been used at a similar roller coaster, Revolution (Dutch Wiki), at Bobbejaanland, a family park in Lichtaart, Belgium from 2004 to 2008 and since 2011.

== Discography ==
=== Albums ===
- Departure from the Northern Wasteland (1978)
- Xcept One (1987)
- The Blob soundtrack (1988)
- Dark Skies score (1997)

=== with Agitation Free ===
- All albums, except River of Return

=== with Tangerine Dream ===
- Bootleg Box Set Vol. 1 (2003)
- In Search of Hades: The Virgin Recordings 1973-1979 (2019)

=== with Manuel Göttsching ===
- Early Water (1997)

=== Producer ===
- Lovely Thunder – Harold Budd (1986)

== Filmography ==
=== Films ===
- Deadly Encounter (1982)
- Koyaanisqatsi (1982 – additional music)
- Night Patrol (1984)
- Silent Witness (1985)
- 9½ Weeks (1986 – additional music)
- The Wraith (1986)
- The Gate (1987)
- Shattered Spirits (1987)
- The Blob (1988)
- I, Madman (1989)
- The Last of the Finest (1990)
- Class of 1999 (1990)
- Visions of Murder (1993)
- The Amy Fisher Story (1993)
- Search for Grace (1994)
- Eyes of Terror (1994)
- Above Suspicion (1995)
- Terminal Justice (1995)
- Her Costly Affair (1996)
- Thrill (1996)
- After Alice (1999)
- Contaminated Man (2000)
- Dracula 3000 (2004)

=== Television series ===
- Max Headroom (1987–88)
- Dark Skies (1996–1997)
- Strange World (1999)
- The District (2000–2004)

=== Games ===
- Baldur's Gate (1998)
- Baldur's Gate: Tales of the Sword Coast (1999)
- Baldur's Gate II: Shadows of Amn (2000)
