= Hark Bohm =

German actor and filmmaker (1939–2025)

- Bohm in 2017
- Born: 18 May 1939; Hamburg-Othmarschen, Germany
- Died: 14 November 2025 (aged 86); Hamburg, Germany
- Occupations: Actor; director
- Years active: 1967–2025

Hark Bohm (German: [haʁk boːm]; 18 May 1939 – 14 November 2025) was a German actor, screenwriter, film director, playwright, novelist and professor of cinema studies. He was most notable for his long-time collaboration with Rainer Werner Fassbinder and as a film director.

== Life and career ==
Bohm was born in Hamburg-Othmarschen and grew up on the island Amrum. His younger brother was the actor Marquard Bohm, who starred in some of his early films.

His first feature film as a director was the German western Tschetan, der Indianerjunge shot in 1972 and starring his brother Marquard as well as his adopted son Dschingis Bowakow as Tschetan.

In 1978, he directed the film Moritz, Dear Moritz, which was entered into the 28th Berlin International Film Festival. Ten years later, his film Yasemin was entered into the 38th Berlin International Film Festival. In 1990, his film Herzlich willkommen was entered into the 40th Berlin International Film Festival. In 1997, he was a member of the jury at the 47th Berlin International Film Festival.

In 2025, Bohm and Fatih Akin released the coming-of-age movie Amrum. The world premiere was at the 2025 Cannes Film Festival.

Bohm died on 14 November 2025, at the age of 86.

== Selected filmography ==
=== As actor ===
- Red Sun (1970) – Linker Student
- The American Soldier (1970) – Doc
- The Big Mess (1971) – Oberst von Schaacke
- Willi Tobler und der Untergang der 6. Flotte (1972, TV Movie) – Chief Admiral of the 6th Fleet
- The Merchant of Four Seasons (1972) – Chief Policeman
- Liebe, so schön wie Liebe (1972)
- Ali: Fear Eats the Soul (1974) – Doctor
- Effie Briest (1974) – Apotheker Gieshübler (uncredited)
- Fox and His Friends (1975) – Policeman Müller (uncredited)
- Strongman Ferdinand (1976)
- Bomber & Paganini (1976) – Syndikatssekretär
- Adolf and Marlene (1977)
- Moritz, Dear Moritz (1978) – Arzt
- Despair (1978) – Doctor
- Der kleine Godard an das Kuratorium junger deutscher Film (1978) – First Director
- The Marriage of Maria Braun (1979) – Senkenberg
- It Can Only Get Worse (1979)
- The Third Generation (1979) – Gerhard Gast
- 1+1=3 [de] (1979) – Lawyer
- Panic Time (1980) – Peitschenperverser Dr. Gerhard Kühn
- Slow Attack (1980) – TV-Moderator
- Berlin Alexanderplatz (1980, TV Mini-Series) – Otto Lüders
- Lili Marleen (1980) – Taschner
- Lola (1981) – Völker
- Alles unter Kontrolle. Notizen auf dem Weg zum Überwachungsstaat (1983)
- Love Is the Beginning of All Terror (1984) – Torsten
- Power of Evil (1985) – Notar
- Nicht nichts ohne Dich (1985) – Architekturprofessor
- Das Go! Projekt (1986, TV Movie) – Professor Oppenheimer
- The Little Prosecutor (1987) – Staatsanwalt König
- Fucking Fernand (1987) – Von Schaltz
- Ossegg oder Die Wahrheit über Hänsel und Gretel (1987) – Petschau-Hartlieb
- Linie 1 (1988) – Er
- Treffen in Travers (1988) – Bürgermeister
- With the Next Man Everything Will Be Different (1989) – 1. Stammgast
- Das Spinnennetz (1989) – Dada-Künstler
- Adrian und die Römer (1989) – Augenarzt
- Erdenschwer (1989) – Chefarzt
- Herzlich willkommen (1990) – Direktor Dr. Fischer
- Lost in Siberia (1991) – Max Brunovich
- Schtonk! (1992) – Catholic pastor
- Ruby Cairo (1992) – German (uncredited)
- Madregilda (1993) – Alvariño
- Justice (1993) – Prof. Winter
- The Promise (1994) – Müller II
- Underground (1995) – Dr. Strasse
- Conversation with the Beast (1996) – Dr. Hassler
- Forever and Ever (1997) – Richter
- Knockin' on Heaven's Door (1997) – Polizeipsychologe
- Der Hauptmann von Köpenick (1997, TV Movie) – Kriminalinspektor Schmude
- Trial by Fire (1998) – Psychiater Dr. Bohm
- 'Ne günstige Gelegenheit (1999) – Dobisch
- Invincible (2001) – Judge
- Falcons (2002) – A Man of the World
- True North (2006) – Pol
- Underdog (2007) – Herr Wache
- The Charlemagne Code (2008, TV film) – Heinrich Brenner
- What if Death Do Us Part? (2008) – Busfahrer
- The Architect (2008) – Roth
- If Not Us, Who? (2011) – Kritiker
- Warum? (2018) – Friedrich Zeidler
- The Golden Glove (2019) – Dornkaat-Max
- Amrum (2025) - The older Nanning Hagener

=== As director ===
- Einer wird verletzt, träumt, stirbt und wird vergessen (1971, short)
- Tschetan, der Indianerjunge (1972)
- Wir pfeifen auf den Gurkenkönig (1974–76, TV)
- North Sea Is Dead Sea (1975/76)
- Moritz, Dear Moritz (1978)
- Im Herzen des Hurrican (1979/80)
- No Time for Tears: The Bachmeier Case (1983)
- Wie ein freier Vogel – Como un pájaro libre (1985, documentary)
- The Little Prosecutor (1987)
- Yasemin (1988)
- Herzlich willkommen (1990)
- Forever and Ever (1996)
- Vera Brühne (2000/01, TV miniseries)
- Sterne, die nie untergehen / Atlantic Affairs (2002, TV film)
- Goodbye Berlin (2016, only screenplay)

=== Novels ===
Amrum. Roman. Ullstein Verlag, Berlin 2024
