= Elective Affinities (film) =

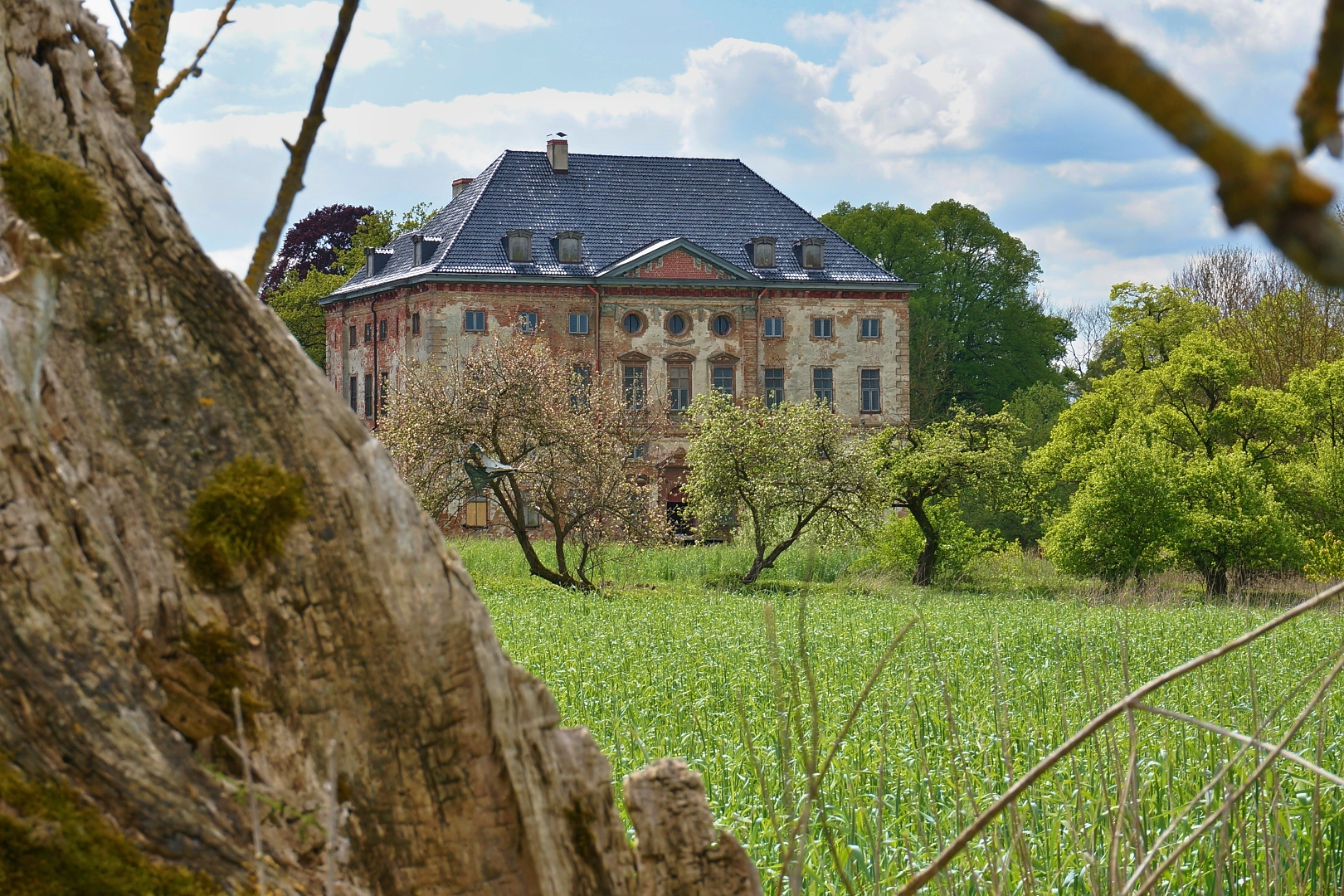
- The film was shot at Schloss Rossewitz
- Directed by: Siegfried Kühn
- Screenplay by: Siegfried Kühn
- Based on: Elective Affinities by Johann Wolfgang von Goethe
- Produced by: Bernd Gerwien
- Cinematography: Claus Neumann
- Edited by: Helga Krause; Renate Bade
- Music by: Karl-Ernst Sasse
- Production company: DEFA
- Release date: 27 August 1974
- Running time: 103 minutes
- Country: East Germany
- Language: German

Elective Affinities (German: Die Wahlverwandtschaften) is a 1974 East German drama film directed by Siegfried Kühn. It follows the dynamics which ensue when a couple invite two other people. The film is based on Johann Wolfgang von Goethe's 1809 novel Elective Affinities. It was released by the DEFA film studio on 27 August 1974.

== Cast ==
- Beata Tyszkiewicz as Charlotte
- Hilmar Thate as Eduard
- Magda Vasary as Ottilie
- Gerry Wolff as the Captain
- Horst Schulze as Mittler
- Christine Schorn as Baroness
- Volkmar Kleinert as Count
- Jana Plichtová as Luciane
- Nico Turoff as gardener
- Jost Braun as architect

== Reception ==
The journal Film-Dienst wrote: "In the historical scenography and in the dialogue, the film misses the issues of the original work; shortenings and tightenings occasionally make the developments incomprehensible. What in Goethe is presented as a clash of moral and natural laws, appears in the film as a questioning of norms, moral and ethics of civil marriage. For literature fans still a remarkable contribution."
