= Helmut Herbst =

German film director (1934–2021)

- Born: 2 December 1934; Escherhof, Germany
- Died: 9 October 2021 (aged 86)
- Occupations: Film director Film producer Screenwriter
- Years active: 1963–1998

Helmut Herbst (2 December 1934 – 9 October 2021) was a German film director, producer and screenwriter. He directed 16 films between 1963 and 1998. His 1982 film Eine deutsche Revolution was entered into the 32nd Berlin International Film Festival.

== Selected filmography ==
- Eine deutsche Revolution (1982)
- The Serpentine Dancer (1992)
