= Uschi Obermaier =

German model (born 1946)

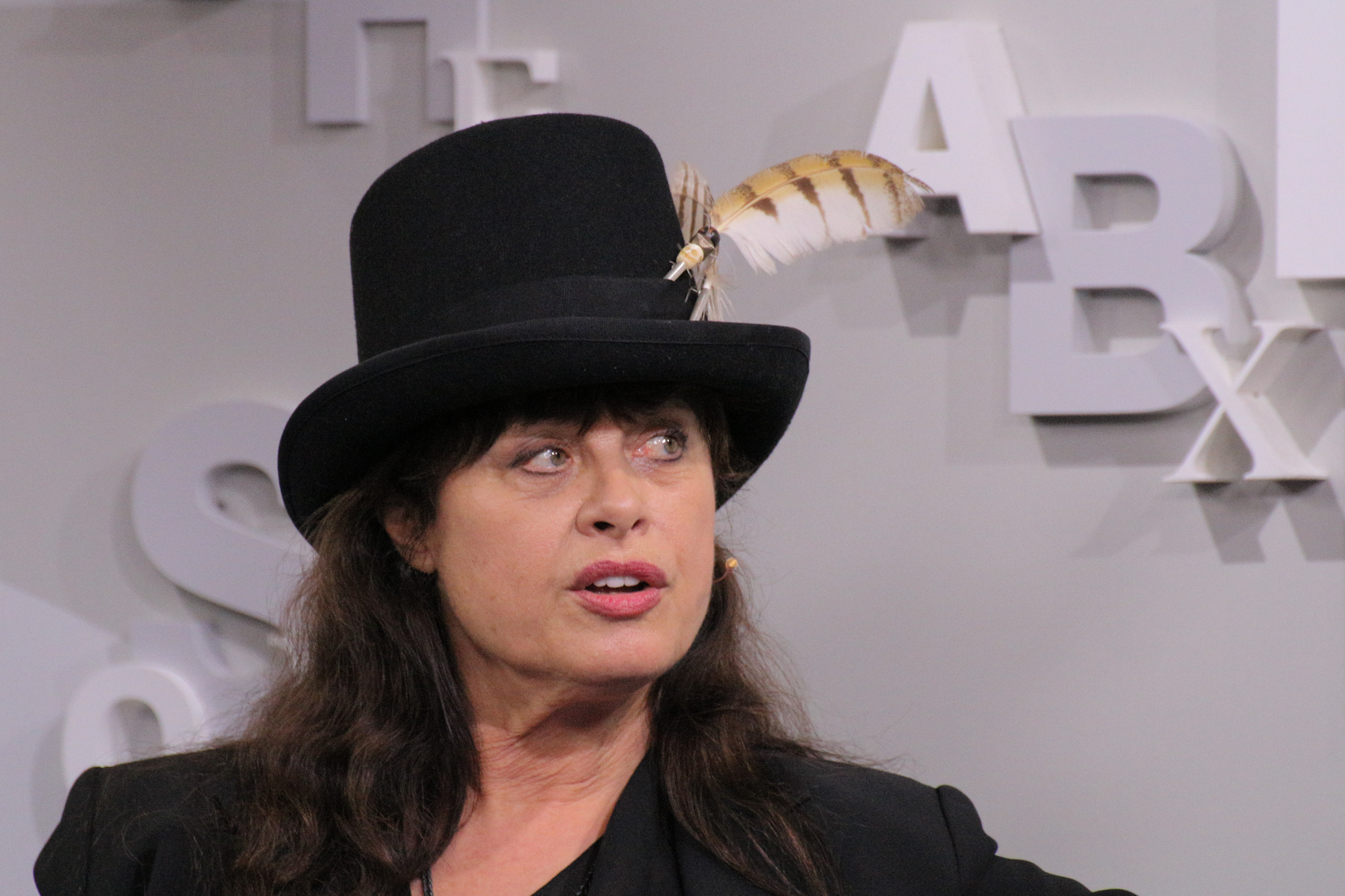
- Portrait of Obermaier during the Frankfurt Book Fair, 2013
- Born: Ursula Obermaier; 1946 (age 79–80); Sendling, Munich, Southwest zone
- Other name: Chrissi Malberg
- Citizenship: US
- Occupations: Photo-restorer; Model
- Television: Detectives; Red Sun
- Movement: 1968; Sexual revolution
- Spouse: Dieter Bockhorn (m. 1977; died 1983)
- Partner: Rainer Langhans (1968–1973)
- Modeling information
- Hair color: Brown
- Eye color: Hazel
- Musical career
- Instrument: Maraca
- Works: Psychedelic Underground; "Voices of Where"
- Years active: 1969–1978
- Formerly of: Amon Düül I
- Website: Uschi Obermaier on Instagram

Signature
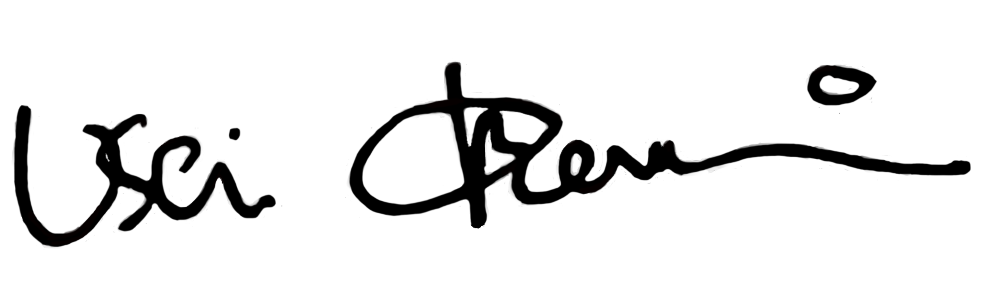

Ursula "Uschi" Obermaier (German pronunciation: [ˈʊʃi ˈʔoːbɐˌmaɪɐ]; born 1946) is a former fashion model and actress associated with the 1968 left-wing movement in Germany. She is considered an iconic sex symbol of the so-called "1968 generation" and the protests of 1968.

== Obermaier and Kommune 1 ==
Obermaier was born in Sendling, a district of Munich, Germany. She started an apprenticeship as a photo-restorer but gave it up to become a model. She was discovered by the magazine Twen. After a successful photo-shoot with photographer Guido Mangold in Cameroon, she became its top model and internationally famous. She went on to work for other magazines and top photographers such as Helmut Newton.

In Munich, she was briefly a member of the Munich-based experimental commune and band Amon Düül around 1968–69 and lived in their commune. She met communard Rainer Langhans at a concert at the end of 1968 and she soon moved from Munich to the Berlin-based Kommune 1 after Langhans became her boyfriend. They talked openly to the media about their relationship, becoming symbols of the sexual revolution. They became the German version of John Lennon and Yoko Ono.

Kommune 1 was the first politically motivated commune in Germany, and Obermaier's name is most intimately connected with the 1960s student rebellions in the minds of many Germans. However, she later said that she had no particular interest in politics, and that she moved into Kommune 1 simply to be close to Langhans. Photos of her at political demonstrations and with members of the Kommune appeared in all the popular magazines of the time.

After the end of Kommune 1 in 1969, Langhans and Obermaier moved to the Highfisch-Kommune in Munich.

== Life after Kommune 1 ==
In 1973, Obermaier fell in love with Dieter Bockhorn, the wealthy owner of a club in Hamburg's Reeperbahn red-light district.

Obermaier went on The Rolling Stones' Tour of the Americas '75 and is said to have had affairs with both Keith Richards and Mick Jagger, as well as with Jimi Hendrix – a visitor to Kommune 1 – with whom she can be seen kissing and cuddling farewell outside the West Berlin hotel Kempinski in the movie Last Experience.

Obermaier and Bockhorn travelled the world in a customized bus, first spending three years in Asia, then going to Mexico and the U.S. for another three years. Obermaier said in an interview in 2006 that reports that she and Bockhorn had a traditional wedding in every country they travelled in were untrue. They married only once, in India. Their relationship ended abruptly after ten years when Dieter Bockhorn died in a motorcycle accident in Mexico on New Year's Eve, 1983.

== Acting ==
Obermaier played alongside Iris Berben in Rudolf Thome's Detectives (1969). She was the protagonist of Red Sun (1970). She also played a small role alongside Rainer Langhans in Haytabo, and portrayed Marlene Thompson in Blutrausch (1997).

== Music ==
She played maracas in the band Amon Düül I on three albums: Psychedelic Underground (1969), Collapsing (1970), and Disaster (1972). She also sang on the track "Voices Of Where" on Michael Hoenig's album Departure from the Northern Wasteland.

== Autobiography ==
The authorized biography of Obermaier's life, High Times, was written by Obermaier and Olaf Kraemer. The book reached third place on the best seller list and stayed there for five months.

The biography was adapted into a biographical film, Eight Miles High (original title in German: Das wilde Leben). The controversial movie was directed by Achim Bornhak and released in February 2007. The movie was reclassified by distributors from PG 16 to PG 12 and reached number ten at the box office. The aggregate film review website Metacritic awarded it a score of 32 out of 100, based on 10 reviews.

== Later life ==
Obermaier was granted American citizenship. She lived in Topanga Canyon near Los Angeles, and worked as a jewellery designer. As of 2021, she lives on the Algarve coast, Portugal.

Obermaier is featured on the cover of 12" single, These Days, by Los Angeles band Xu Xu Fang.

== Literature ==
- Uschi Obermaier: Das wilde Leben, Hoffmann und Campe, Hamburg 1994, ISBN 3-455-08603-9, (Autobiography)
- Olaf Kraemer, Uschi Obermaier: High Times – Mein wildes Leben (Autobiography), Heyne Verlag, München 2007, ISBN 978-3-453-13010-4.
- Uschi Obermaier: Expect Nothing! Die Geschichte einer ungezähmten Frau. Riemann Verlag 2013, ISBN 978-3-570-50156-6, (Autobiography, in German)
