= Klaus Lemke =

German film director

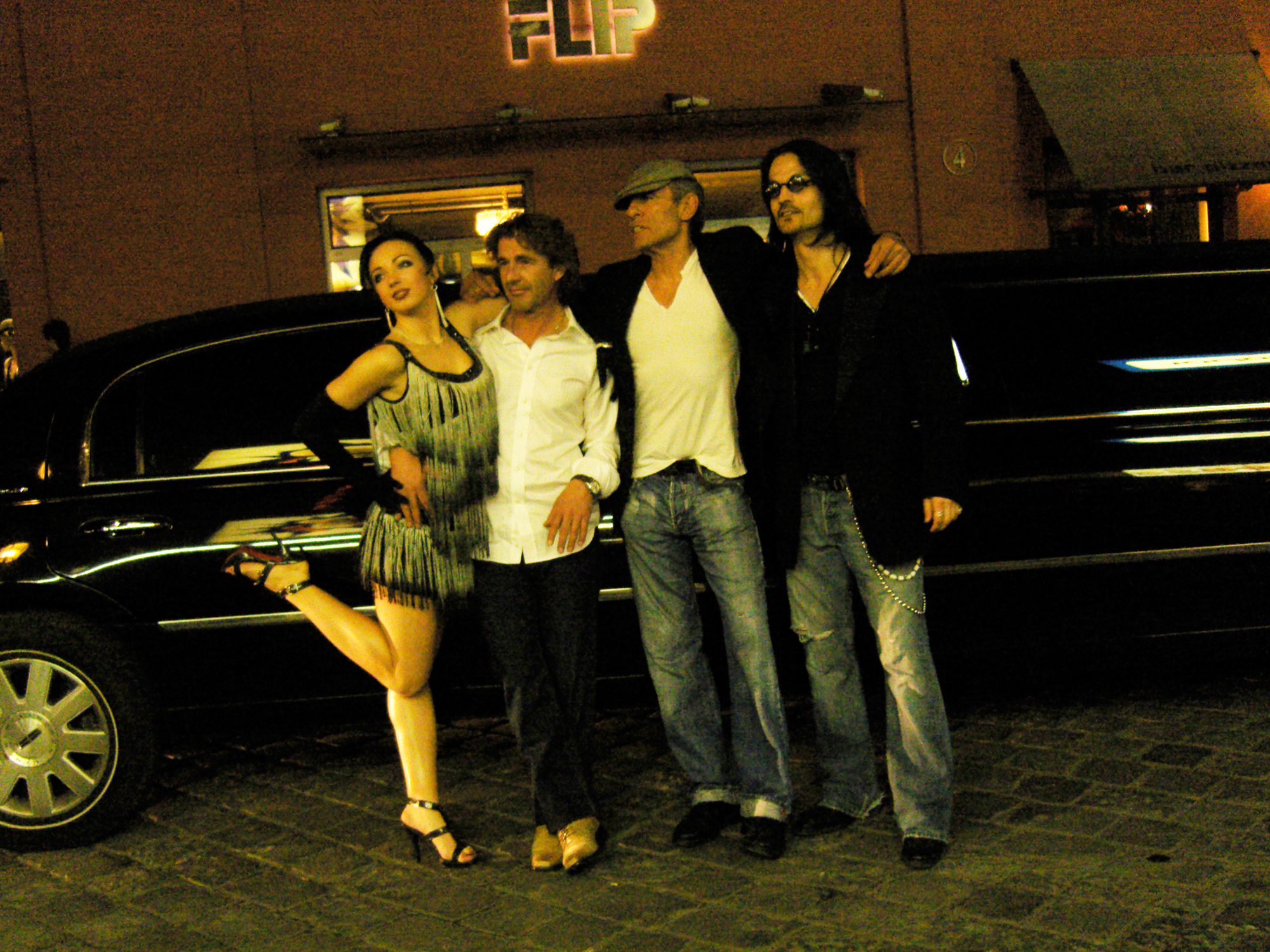
- Lemke (third from left) at the 2009 premiere of Dancing with Devils with crew members
- Born: 13 October 1940; Landsberg an der Warthe, Germany
- Died: 7 July 2022 (aged 81); Munich, Bavaria, Germany
- Occupations: Director, screenwriter, actor
- Years active: 1964-2021 (film)

Klaus Lemke (1940–2022) was a German film director, screenwriter and actor. Associated with the New German Cinema movement, he made his feature-length debut with Forty Eight Hours to Acapulco (1967) and followed it up with Negresco (1968). Many of his films of the 1970s were produced for West German television.

== Selected filmography ==
- Forty Eight Hours to Acapulco (1967)
- Negresco (1968)
- That Guy Loves Me, Am I Supposed to Believe That? (1969)
- Love Is as Beautiful as Love (1971)

== Bibliography ==
- Gerhardt, Christina & Abel, Marco. Celluloid Revolt: German Screen Cultures and the Long 1968. Camden House, 2019.
- Rother, Rainer (ed.) German Film: From the Archives of the Deutsche Kinemathek. Hatje Cantz Verlag, 2024.
