= Rudolf Thome =

German film director (born 1939)

- Born: 14 November 1939 (age 86); Wallau, Germany
- Occupations: Film director, film producer
- Years active: 1964–present

Rudolf Thome (born 14 November 1939) is a German film director and producer. He has directed more than 30 films since 1964. His 1986 film Tarot was entered into the 15th Moscow International Film Festival.

== Selected filmography ==
Director

- Detectives (1969)
- Red Sun (1970)
- Supergirl (1971)
- Strange City (1972)
- Made in Germany and USA (1974)
- Diary (1975)
- Study of an Island (1979)
- Berlin Chamissoplatz (1980)
- Closed Circuit (1983)
- Tarot (1986)
- The Microscope (1988)
- The Philosopher (1989)
- Seven Women (1989)
- Love at First Sight (1991)
- The Sun Goddess (1992)
- Secret of Love (1995)
- Just Married (1998)
- Tiger-Stripe Woman Waits for Tarzan (1998)
- Paradiso: Seven Days with Seven Women (2000)
- Venus Talking (2000)
- Red and Blue (2003)
- Woman Driving, Man Sleeping (2004)
- You Told Me, You Love Me (2006)
- Smoke Signs (2006)
- The Visible and the Invisible (2007)
- Pink (2009)
- The Red Room (2010)
- Into the Blue (2012)

Actor

- Forty Eight Hours to Acapulco (1967)
- Diary (1975)
