= Rainer Langhans =

German writer and filmmaker

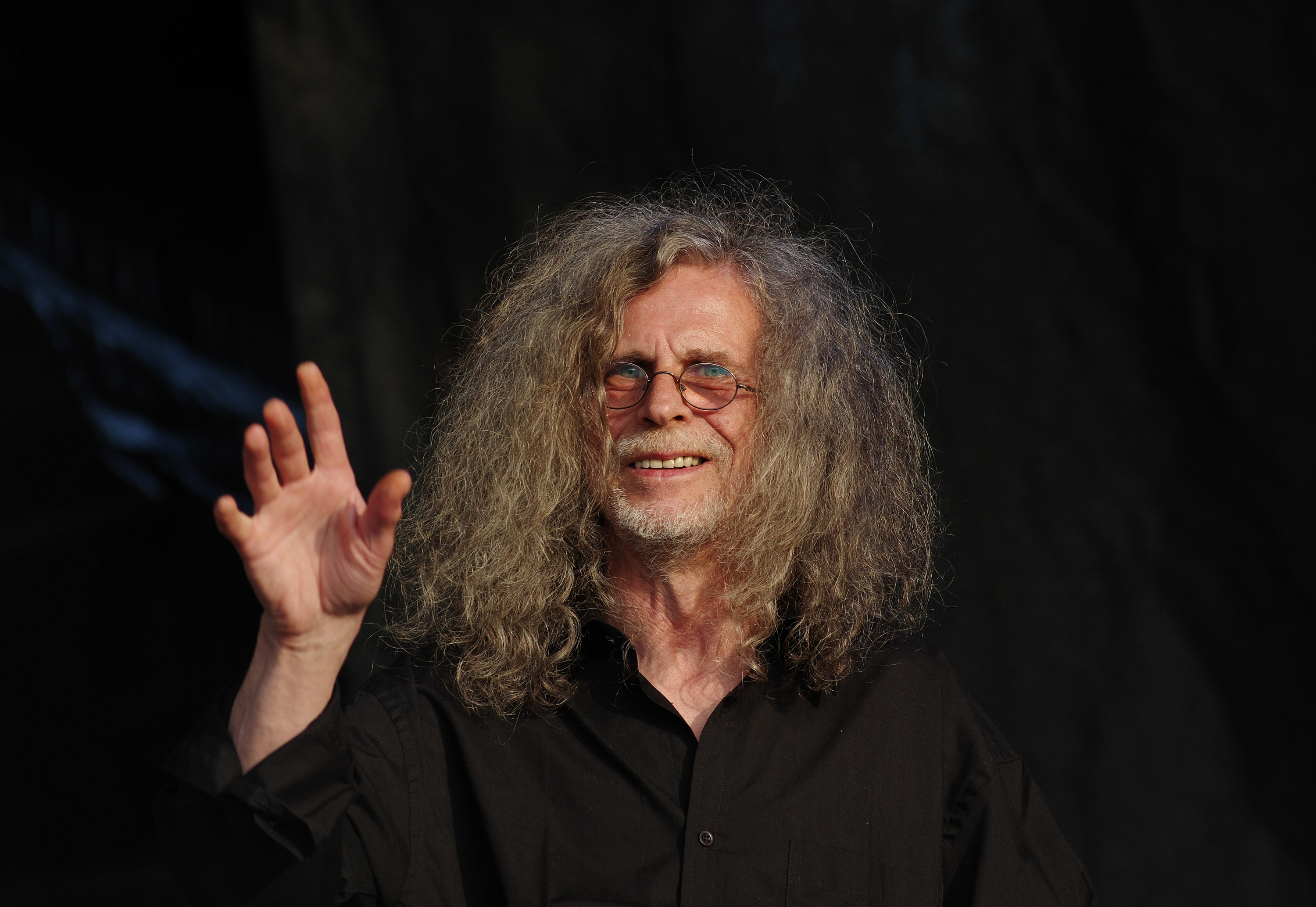
- Portrait of Langhans at a punk festival in Hünxe, 2013
- Born: June 19, 1940 (age 86); Oschersleben, Province of Saxony, Nazi Germany
- Education: Free University of Berlin
- Organization: Kommune 1
- Television: Ich bin ein Star – Holt mich hier raus!
- Partner: Uschi Obermaier
- Awards: Grimme-Preis
- Conscription
- Allegiance: West Germany
- Branch: Bundeswehr
- Service years: 1960–1961
- Rank: Fähnrich
- Website: rainerlanghans.de

Signature
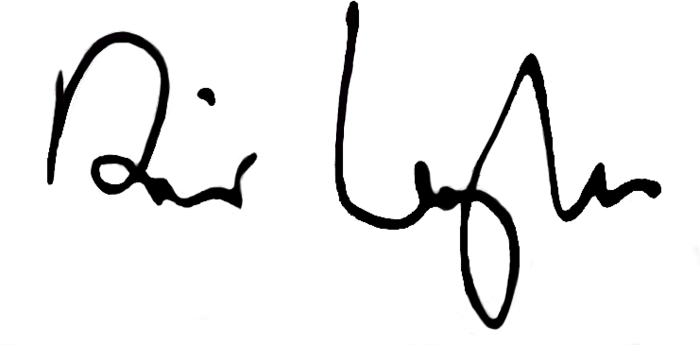

Rainer Langhans (born 19 June 1940 in Oschersleben) is a German writer and filmmaker who is primarily known for his membership in Kommune 1.
