= Tilo Prückner =

German actor and author (1940–2020)

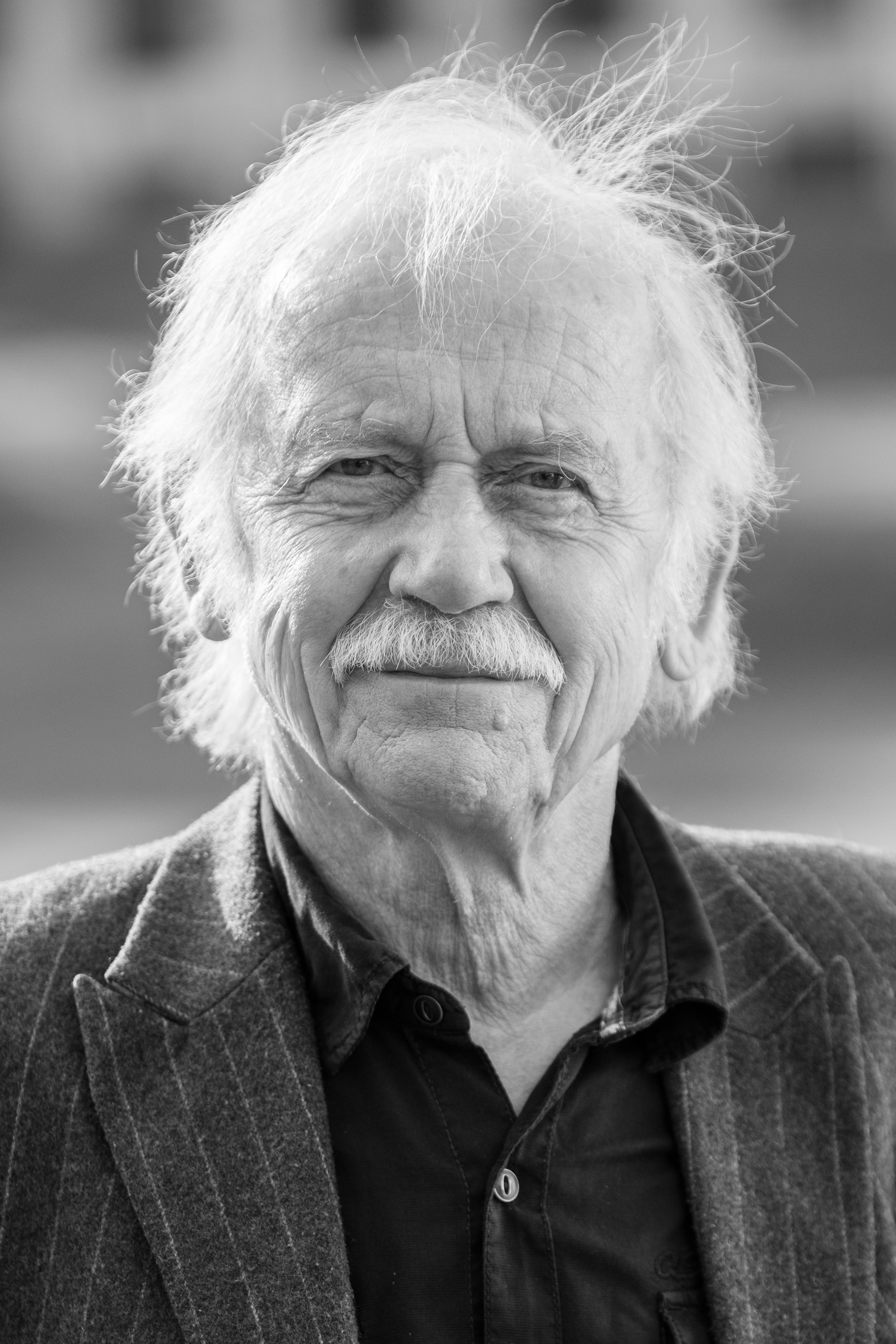
- Prückner in 2018
- Born: 26 October 1940; Augsburg, Germany
- Died: 2 July 2020 (aged 79); Berlin, Germany
- Years active: 1967–2020

Tilo Prückner (26 October 1940 – 2 July 2020) was a German television and film actor. His career spanned five decades and more than 100 films. He became known for his portrayal of often eccentric characters in high-profile public television productions such as Tatort, Adelheid und ihre Mörder, Kommissarin Lucas and Rentnercops.

== Early life ==
Tilo Prückner was born in Augsburg, the son of the paediatrician Alfred Prückner and his wife Dorothea née Krause in Augsburg. The Prückner family has a long reaching family tradition in Hof. He first went to the St. Anna-Gymnasium in Augsburg and changed then to the school Melanchthon-Gymnasium in Nürnberg, where he passed his Abitur in 1960. He dropped his study of law to begin an actor's education in Munich with Hans Josef Becher and Ellen Mahlke.

== Career ==
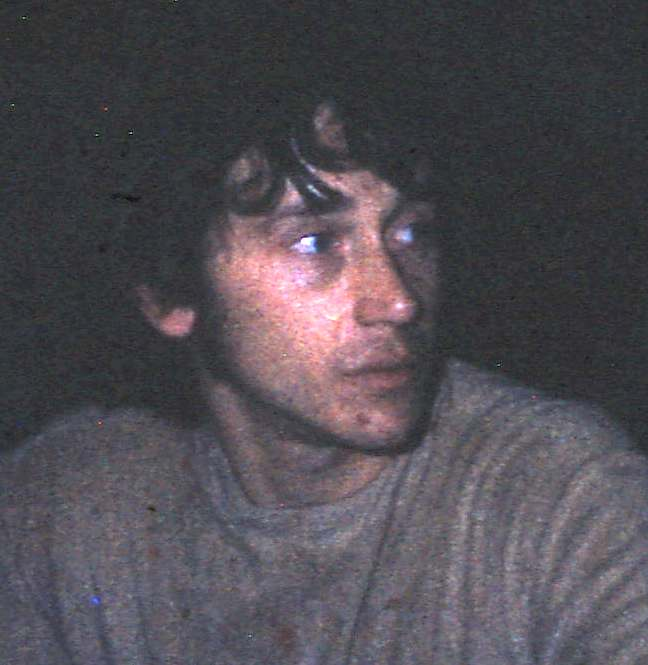
During rehearsals for The Knack by Ann Jellicoe Theater Oberhausen 1968

From 1962 until 1964 he was employed at the Schauburg in Munich, and afterwards worked at the Theater St. Gallen, from 1966 to 1968 at the Theater Oberhausen and 1968/1969 at the Schauspielhaus Zürich. From 1970 to 1973, he played at Berlin's Schaubühne, where he was one of the founding members. Since 1973 he worked as a freelance actor at the Bayerisches Staatsschauspiel in Munich.

After his participation in the TV recordings of productions at the Schaubühne, his work with directors of the New German Cinema increased, including Bernhard Sinkel, Edgar Reitz and Peter Fleischmann. He often played sick or handicapped people. In 1976 Prückner received the German Actors Award for his role as the violinist Hännschen Wurlitzer in Bomber & Paganini. Among his more recognized roles with international audiences are the bat-riding "Night Hob" in the 1984 fantasy film The NeverEnding Story and the scientist Dr. Richter in the 2012 science fiction comedy Iron Sky.

In later years, Prückner proved his art of interpreting diverse characters in a great number of movie and TV productions, often portraying cranky or eccentric characters. He appeared as the hypochondriac detective Gernot Schubert in the TV-series Adelheid und ihre Mörder for six years, co-starring with Evelyn Hamann and Heinz Baumann. Since 2003, he had a regular supporting role in the TV-series Kommissarin Lucas as the landlord of the main character played by Ulrike Kriener. From 2015 until his death, he played a lead role in the ARD crime series Rentnercops about retired cops who are hired back into their jobs.

In 2013, he published his first novel, Willi Merkatz wird verlassen.

== Death ==
On 2 July 2020 Prückner died of a sudden heart failure in Berlin at the age of 79.

== Selected filmography ==
- Wilder Reiter GmbH (1967, dir. Franz-Josef Spieker) as Stiglitz
- Apokal (1971, dir. Paul Anczykowski) as Miles
- Die Verrohung des Franz Blum (1974, dir. Reinhard Hauff) as Zick Zack
- One or the Other of Us (1974, dir. Wolfgang Petersen) as Drögnitz
- Schoolmaster Hofer (1975, dir. Peter Lilienthal) as Custodian
- Valley of the Dancing Widows (1975, dir. Volker Vogeler) as Crazy Butch
- John Glückstadt (1975, dir. Ulf Miehe) as Michel
- A Happy Family Life (1975, dir. Marianne Lüdcke, Ingo Kratisch) as Manfred
- Berlinger (1975, dir. Bernhard Sinkel, Alf Brustellin) as Laski
- The Sternstein Manor (1976, dir. Hans W. Geißendörfer) as Nepomuk Kleebinder aka Muckerl
- Paule Pauländer (1976, dir. Reinhard Hauff) as Charly
- Hans im Glück (1976, TV Movie, dir. Wolfgang Petersen) as Albert Bäumler
- Bomber & Paganini (1976, dir. Nikos Perakis) as Hänschen "Paganini" Wurlitzer
- Grete Minde (1977, dir. Heidi Genée) as Gerd Minde
- SOKO 5113 (1978–2014, TV Series, 11 episodes) as Kriminalhauptmeister Neubert / Hermann Heindl
- Paul kommt zurück (1978, TV Movie, dir. Peter F. Bringmann) as Kalle
- Der harte Handel (1978, TV Movie, dir. Uli Edel) as Sepp Lederer
- The Man in the Rushes (1978, dir. Manfred Purzer) as Tramp
- The Tailor from Ulm (1978, dir. Edgar Reitz) as Albrecht Berblinger
- Lena Rais (1979, dir. Christian Rischert) as Albert Rais
- The Hamburg Syndrome (1979, dir. Peter Fleischmann) as Fritz
- The Willi Busch Report (1979, dir. Niklaus Schilling) as Willi Busch
- Die Kinder aus Nr. 67 (1980) as Herr Brackmann
- Der Schatz des Priamos (1981, TV Movie, dir. Karl Fruchtmann) as Heinrich Schliemann
- The Magic Mountain (1982, dir. Hans W. Geißendörfer) as Lehrer Popow
- Non-Stop Trouble with Spies (1983, dir. Ottokar Runze) as Fred
- Banks and Robbers (1983, dir. Rolf Silber) as Herr Bauermann
- Unser Mann vom Südpol (1984, TV Movie, dir. Peter Adam) as Fred
- Non-Stop Trouble with My Double (1984, dir. Reinhard Schwabenitzky) as Bazille
- The NeverEnding Story (1984, dir. Wolfgang Petersen) as Night Hob
- Fear of Falling (1984, dir. Christian Rischert) as Theo Schuster
- Tiger: Springtime in Vienna (1984)
- The Little Prosecutor (1987) as Von Knörringen
- Freckled Max and the Spooks (1987) as Sepp
- Herz mit Löffel (1987)
- Wallers letzter Gang (1989) as Paul Schönfaerber
- Hab' ich nur deine Liebe (1989) as Michael Seebisch
- Verfolgte Wege (1989) as Heindl
- Border Frenzy (1992, dir. Niklaus Schilling) as Willi Busch
- Pauline In Between (1993) as Teacher
- Adelheid und ihre Mörder (1993–2000, TV Series, 26 episodes) as Kriminalhauptmeister Gernot Schubert
- 'El Chicko' – der Verdacht (1996) as Paul's father
- Alle für die Mafia (1998) as Sepp
- Pinky and the Million Dollar Pug (2001) as Punk
- Goebbels und Geduldig (2001) as Heinrich Hoffmann
- Tatort (2001–2008, TV Series, 15 episodes) as Kriminaloberkommissar Eduard Holicek
- Kommissarin Lucas (2003–2019, TV Series, 29 episodes) as Max Kirchhoff
- Die Stunde der Offiziere (2004) as Friedrich Olbricht
- Willenbrock (2005) as Fritz
- 5 vor 12 (2006) as Geldeintreiber #1
- Doppelspiel (2006) as Louis Seyfer
- The Counterfeiters (2007) as Hahn
- SEK Calw (2007)
- Mein Freund aus Faro (2008) as Willi Wandel
- Totgesagte leben länger (2008) as Psychiater
- Räuber Kneißl (2008) as Schreiner Christof
- Whiskey with Vodka (2009) as Wirt Landgasthof
- Village People 2 – Auf der Jagd nach dem Nazigold (2009) as Adolf Hitler
- Village People – Voll Porno (2011) as Pornoproduzent
- Anduni (2011) as Onkel
- Holger sacht nix (2011, TV Movie) as Holger Thiessen
- Iron Sky (2012) as Doktor Richter
- Fly Away (2012) as Schlepper
- Little Thirteen (2012) as Holger Schreiber
- Tatort Calw – Hexensabbat (2013) as Dr. Franz Bäuerle
- Windstorm (2013) as Herr Kaan
- Tatort Calw – So ein Theater! (2014) as Attentäter
- Nebenwege (2014) as Ferdl
- Coming In (2014) as Erich
- Herzlos (2014) as Obdachloser
- Head Full of Honey (2014) as Dr. Ehlers
- Windstorm 2 (2015) as Herr Kaan
- Stroppy Cow, Stubborn Ram (2015) as Jakob's Father
- Rentnercops (2015–2020, TV Series, 56 episodes) as Kriminaloberkommissar Edwin Bremer
- Windstorm 3: Windstorm and the Wild Horses (2017) as Herr Kaan
- Village People – Tod aus dem All (2018) as Dr. Bretschneider
- Windstorm 4: Ari's Arrival (2019) as Herr Kaan
- Mordkommission Calw – Schattenkrieger (2019) as Dr. Neufeld

== Awards ==
- 1976 – German Actors Award (Deutscher Darstellerpreis)
- 1980 – Reader Jury Award

== Books ==
- Prückner, Tilo (2013). Willi Merkatz wird verlassen (in German). Berlin: Verbrecher-Verl. ISBN 978-3-943167-40-5. OCLC 864669097.
