= Rolf Zacher =

German actor (1941–2018)

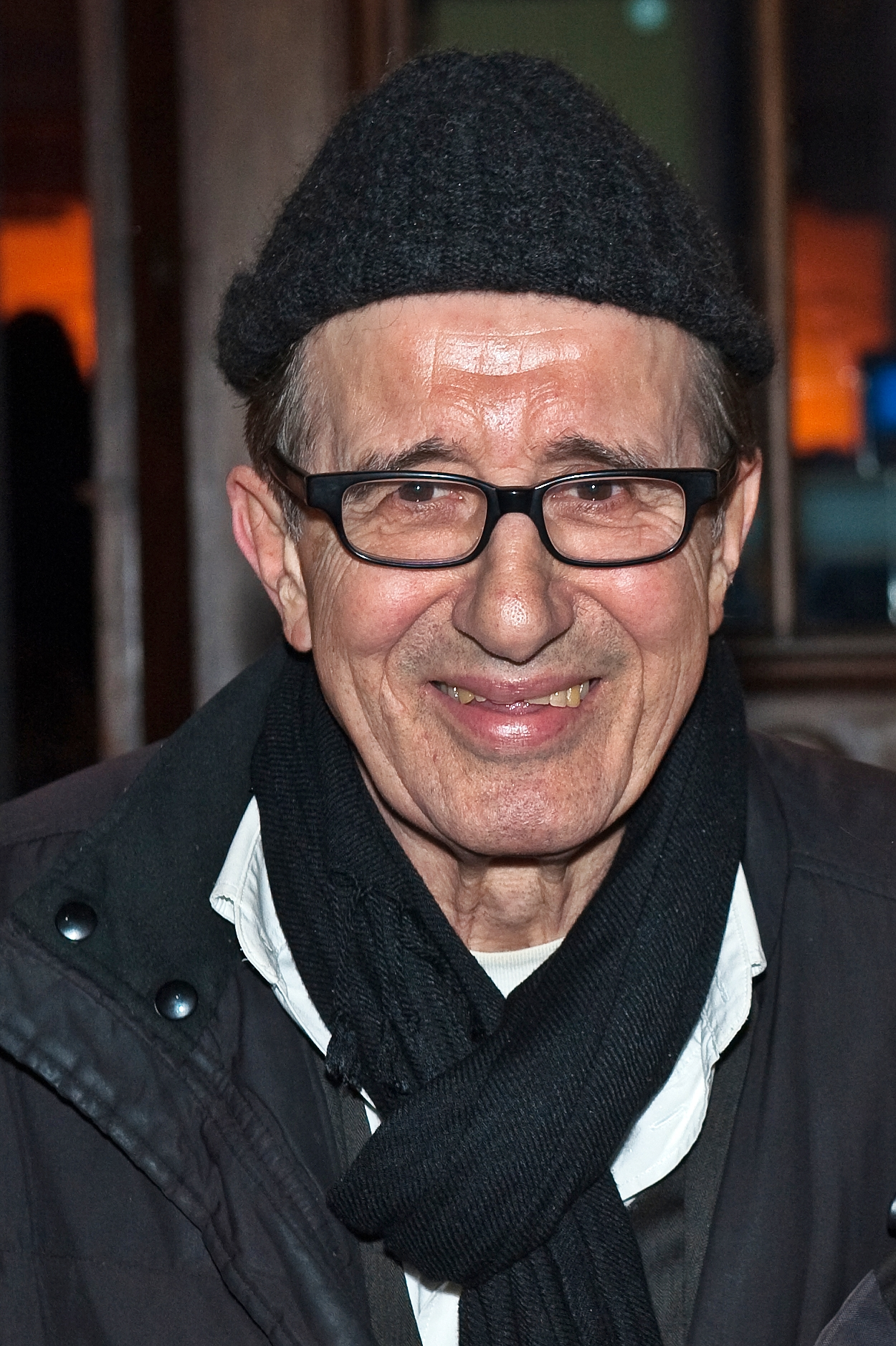
- Zacher in 2010
- Born: 28 March 1941; Berlin, Germany
- Died: 3 February 2018 (aged 76); Hamburg, Germany
- Occupation: Actor
- Years active: 1961–2017
- Spouse: Gisela Schmidt (divorced)
- Children: 1

Rolf Zacher (28 March 1941 – 3 February 2018) was a German actor.

== Life and career ==
Zacher appeared in about 190 films and television shows between 1961 and 2016, often in illustrious or eccentric character roles. He starred in the 1971 film Jaider, der einsame Jäger, which was entered into the 21st Berlin International Film Festival.

He won the Deutscher Filmpreis for portraying a criminal in Reinhard Hauff's film drama Slow Attack (1980). A film critic once called Zacher the "best small-time criminal of German cinema".

In 2016, Zacher appeared in Ich bin ein Star – Holt mich hier raus!, the German version of I'm a Celebrity...Get Me Out of Here!, but had to leave after eight days for medical reasons. He died at a nursing home in Büdelsdorf on 3 February 2018 at the age of 76.

== Selected filmography ==
Year	Title	Role	Director	Notes
1967	The Cuckoo Years	Hans	George Moorse	
1968	Tamara	Kuno Bricks	Hansjürgen Pohland	
1968	Der Griller	Franz Kaffer	George Moorse	TV film
1968	Morning's at Seven	Peter	Kurt Hoffmann	
1968	Liebe und so weiter	Ben Schmidt	George Moorse	
1968	Der Partyphotograph	Anton Pauli	Hans Dieter Bove	Written by Wolfgang Menge
1968	Cantando a la vida	Martin	Angelino Fons	
1969	When Sweet Moonlight Is Sleeping in the Hills	Peter	Wolfgang Liebeneiner	
1970	o.k.	Rowan	Michael Verhoeven	
1971	Lenz	Christoph Kaufmann	George Moorse	
1971	Jaider, der einsame Jäger	Baptist Meyer	Volker Vogeler	
1972	Love Is as Beautiful as Love	Rolf	Klaus Lemke	
1972	The Sensuous Three	Prado	Robert van Ackeren	
1976	Dear Fatherland Be at Peace	Oskar Knargenstein	Roland Klick	
1977	Petty Thieves	Franz	Michael Fengler	
1980	Slow Attack	Henry Kirscher	Reinhard Hauff	Deutscher Filmpreis
1982	The Magic Mountain	Wehsal	Hans W. Geißendörfer	
1982	Woman with the Red Hat		Tatsumi Kumashiro	
1983	The Heartbreakers	Lisa's father	Peter F. Bringmann	
1983	Joyride	Chris Binz	Manfred Stelzer	
1984	Anna's Mother	Ulrich	Burkhard Driest	
1984	Angelo und Luzy	Angelo		TV series, 6 episodes
1984	Knock on the Wrong Door	Thomas	Gabriela Zerhau	
1984	A Kind of Anger	Piet Maas	Uli Edel	TV film
1986	Heidenlöcher		Wolfram Paulus	
1987	Gambit	Christoph Steinbrenner	Peter F. Bringmann	TV film
1987	Smaragd	Rudi Popp	Veith von Fürstenberg	TV film
1988	The Case of Mr. Spalt	Schnellwindt	René Perraudin	
1988	The Venus Trap	Dr. Steiner	Robert van Ackeren	
1988	The Summer of the Hawk	Marek Czerny	Arend Agthe	
1989	C*A*S*H: A Political Fairy Tale	Harry	Norbert Kückelmann	
1992	Rising to the Bait	Zwirner	Vadim Glowna	
1996	We Free Kings	Gaspare	Sergio Citti	
2002	Maximum Speed	Volker Schlegel	Sigi Rothemund	TV film
2004	Guys and Balls	Karl	Sherry Hormann	
2009	Lulu and Jimi	Daddy Cool	Oskar Roehler	
2010	The Hairdresser	Joe	Doris Dörrie	
2010	Jew Suss: Rise and Fall	Erich Engel	Oskar Roehler	
2013	Sources of Life	Erwin	Oskar Roehler	
