= Ludwig Haas =

German actor (1933–2021)

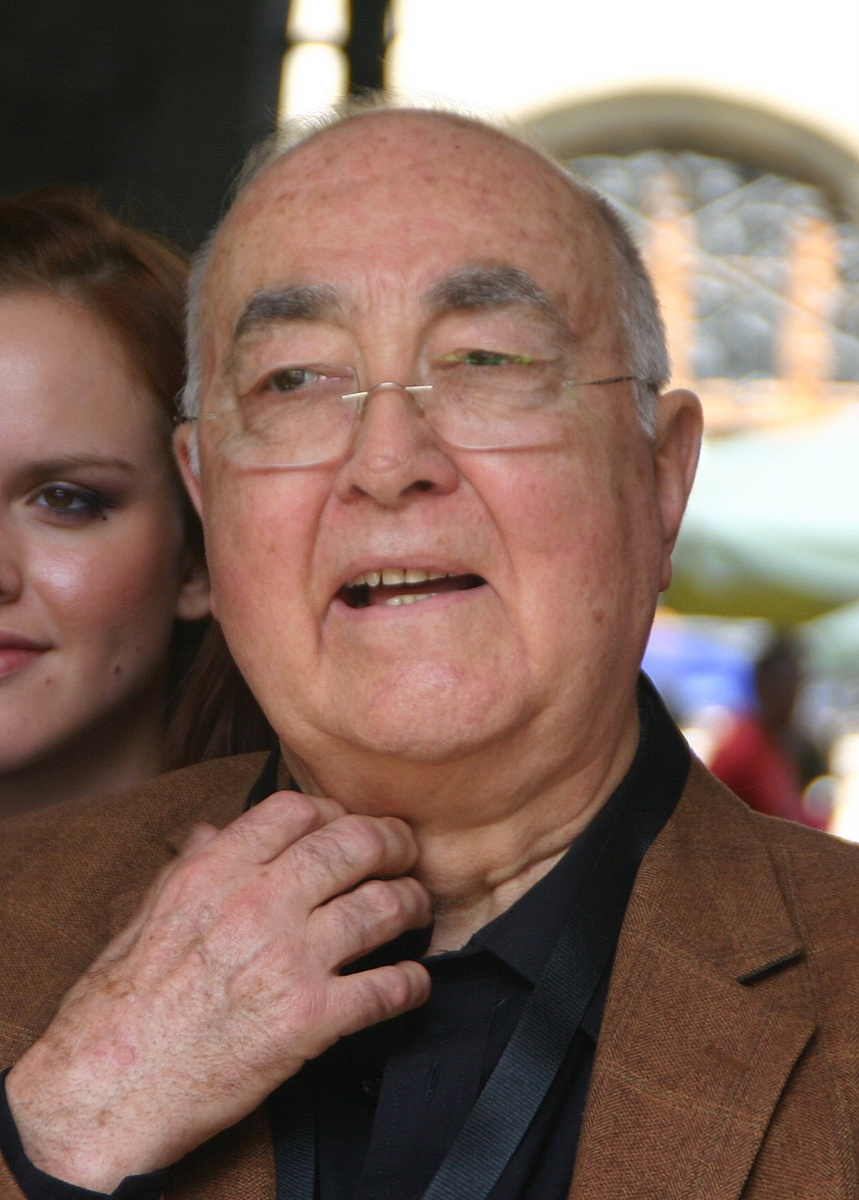
- Haas in 2008
- Born: 16 April 1933; Eutin, Schleswig-Holstein, Germany
- Died: 4 September 2021 (aged 88); Neumünster
- Occupation: Actor

Ludwig Haas (16 April 1933 – 4 September 2021) was a German television actor. He is best known for portraying Dr. Ludwig Dressler in the WDR German television series Lindenstraße, since the very first episode in 1985.

== Personal life ==
Haas was born in Eutin, Free State of Oldenburg, Germany. He was married to Marianne Simon-Haas. They had one daughter together, Franca Simon, and lived in Einfeld in Schleswig-Holstein and Mallorca.

== Partial filmography ==
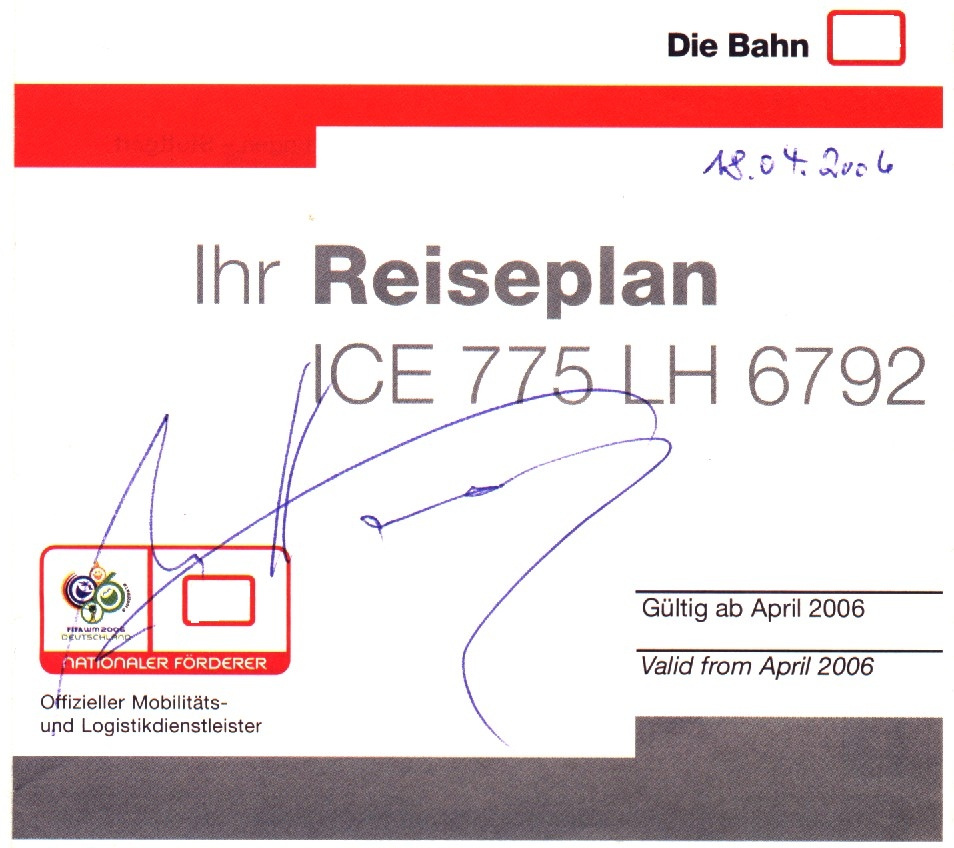
Autograph of Ludwig Haas

- 1975–1992: Tatort - Prof. Wimmer / Leiter der BKA-Außenstelle Bonn / Richter
- 1979: The Willi Busch Report
- 1981–1987: Ein Fall für zwei (TV Series) - Wunderlich / Herr Schlagheck
- 1984: Echt tu matsch
- 1985: Big Mäc - Rektor
- 1985: Die Einsteiger - Manager
- 1985: Georgenberg
- 1985: Die Küken kommen
- 1985–2020: Lindenstraße (TV Series) - Dr. Ludwig Dressler (final appearance)
- 1986: The Assault - General von Braunstein
- 1986–1988: Der Fahnder (TV Series) - Dr. Braun / Möllner
- 1987: Three Crazy Jerks - Hotel manager
- 1987: Das Mädchen mit den Feuerzeugen - Hotelmanager
- 1987–1991: The Old Fox (TV Series) - Dr. Ballhorn
- 1988: A Touch of Danger (TV Movie) - Dave Hamley
- 1988: The Great Escape II: The Untold Story (TV Movie) - Adolf Hitler
- 1989: Forsthaus Falkenau (TV Series) - Herr Malzach
- 1989–1992: Derrick (TV Series) - Kramer / Notarzt
- 1990: Voll daneben – Gags with Diether Krebs
- 1992: Shining Through - Adolf Hitler
- 1992: The Parrot - Fuchsmühl
- 1993: Unser Lehrer Doktor Specht (TV Series) - Stadtrat Paulick
- 1993: Pétain - Hitler
- 1993: Texas – Doc Snyder hält die Welt in Atem - von Zitzewitz
- 1995: Entführung aus der Lindenstraße (TV Movie) - Walther Planck
- 1997: Stubbe – Von Fall zu Fall (TV Series) - Wirt
- 1997–1998: Die Wache (TV Series) - Nikolaus Baron von Laubenthal
- 1998: Wolffs Revier (TV Series) - Kaminski
- 1999: SK Kölsch (TV Series) - Hans Dorfmeister
- 2001: Drehkreuz Airport (TV Series)
