= Arthur Brauss =

German actor (1936–2025)

- Born: 24 July 1936; Augsburg, Germany
- Died: 29 August 2025 (aged 89); Munich, Germany
- Occupation: Actor
- Years active: 1960–2014

Arthur Brauss (24 July 1936 – 29 August 2025) was a German actor and voice actor.

== Life and career ==
Arthur Brauss was born in Augsburg, Germany, on 24 July 1936, the son of a gardener. In 1954 he became Germany's youth champion in pole-vaulting and a member of the national athletics team. In the same year, he graduated from high school in Augsburg. After an apprenticeship at a construction machinery factory, Brauss received a scholarship from the University of Wyoming and studied mathematics and economics while also discovering his interest in acting.

In 1960 he returned to Germany and worked at Radio Free Europe. In 1963, under the direction of Rolf Hädrich, he made his cinema debut in Verspätung in Marienborn as a military policeman. In the ZDF children's series Timm Thaler (1979), Brauss appeared as a first officer on a ship.

As a voice actor, Brauss lent his voice to Dennis Hopper, Brian Dennehy, Max von Sydow, Stephen McHattie, Robbie Coltrane, and others.

He became well known as police officer Richard Block in Jürgen Roland's television series Großstadtrevier. In addition to his international work, Brauss portrayed various roles in Tatort and Der Alte. He made guest appearances in Café Meineid, Münchner Geschichten, Das Kriminalmuseum, Siska, Auf Achse, Wolffs Revier, Ein Fall für TKKG, Derrick, Ein Fall für zwei, Polizeiinspektion 1, Kottan ermittelt, Der Kommissar, Balko, Polizeiruf 110, SOKO München and Der Staatsanwalt. Brauss participated in over 190 film and television productions.

In 2014, Brauss had largely retired from German television and worked mainly in theater. In 2009, he took over the role of Götz von Berlichingen at the Burgfestspiele in Jagsthausen. He lived in the Munich district of Schwabing for over 40 years, and after more than 50 years of partnership, he married Marie Poccolin in 2024. Brauss died on 29 August 2025 at the age of 89 in his Munich apartment.

== Partial filmography ==
- Stop Train 349 (1963, directed by Rolf Hädrich), as I.M.P.
- The Train (1964, directed by John Frankenheimer), as Lt. Pilzer
- Von Ryan's Express (1965, directed by Mark Robson), as Lt. Herman Gertel (uncredited)
- Die Rechnung – eiskalt serviert (1965, directed by Helmut Ashley), as Billy-Boy
- Hot Pavements of Cologne (1967, directed by Ernst Hofbauer), as Paul Keil
- Carmen, Baby (1967, directed by Radley Metzger), as Garcia
- Andrea the Nympho (1968, directed by Hanns Schott-Schöbinger), as Joschi
- Sette baschi rossi (1969, directed by Mario Siciliano), as Captain De Brand
- Dead Body on Broadway (1969, directed by Harald Reinl), as Hank
- The Brutes (1970, directed by Roger Fritz), as Mike
- The Girls from Atlantis (1970, directed by Eckhart Schmidt), as Priest
- Perrak (1970, directed by Alfred Vohrer), as Casanova
- Jonathan (1970, directed by Hans W. Geißendörfer), as Adolf
- Hauser's Memory (1970, directed by Boris Sagal), as Bak
- Jaider, der einsame Jäger (1971, directed by Volker Vogeler), as Bastian
- $ (1971, directed by Richard Brooks), as Candy Man
- The Goalkeeper's Fear of the Penalty (1972, directed by Wim Wenders), as Bloch
- Geradeaus bis zum Morgen (1972, directed by Peter Adam), as Luc
- The Stuff That Dreams Are Made Of (1972, directed by Alfred Vohrer), as Comrade Michailow
- Cry of the Black Wolves (1972, directed by Harald Reinl), as Tornado Kid
- The Girl from Hong Kong (1973, directed by Jürgen Roland), as Delgado
- Was Schulmädchen verschweigen (1973, directed by Ernst Hofbauer), as Franz Kuppler, photographer (uncredited)
- Verflucht dies Amerika (1973, directed by Volker Vogeler), as Sebastian Jennerwein
- Härte 10 (1974–1975, TV miniseries), as Abdul Carraco
- The Swiss Conspiracy (1976, directed by Jack Arnold), as Andre Costa
- Potato Fritz (1976, directed by Peter Schamoni), as James Wesley
- Cross of Iron (1977, directed by Sam Peckinpah), as Pvt. Zoll
- Thaw (1977, directed by Markus Imhoof), as Manfred
- Mister Deathman (1977, directed by Michael D. Moore), as Vincent Napier
- Slavers (1978, directed by Jürgen Goslar), as Rustam
- Triangle of Venus (1978, directed by Hubert Frank), as Howard
- Avalanche Express (1979, directed by Mark Robson), as Neckermann
- The Rebel (1980, directed by Stelvio Massi), as Klaus Beitz
- Mein Freund Winnetou (1980, TV miniseries), as Lt. Robert Merril
- Caleb Williams (1980, TV miniseries), as Grimes
- Escape to Victory (1981, directed by John Huston), as Capt. Lutz
- The Winds of War (1983, TV miniseries), as SS Interrogator
- Happy Weekend (1983, directed by Murray Jordan)
- Raffl (1985, directed by Christian Berger)
- Großstadtrevier (1986–1991, TV series, 36 episodes), as Richard Block
- Ishtar (1987, directed by Elaine May), as German Gunrunner
- Itinéraire d'un enfant gâté (1988, directed by Claude Lelouch), as Photographer
- Gummibärchen küßt man nicht (1989, directed by Walter Bannert), as Colonel
- Confessional (1989, TV miniseries), as General Maslovsky
- My Blue Heaven (1990, directed by Herbert Ross), as Judge
- Knight Moves (1992, directed by Carl Schenkel), as Viktor Yurilivich
- Wir Enkelkinder (1992, directed by Bruno Jonas), as Merklein
- Murder at the Savoy (1993, TV film, directed by Pelle Berglund), as Jürgen Hoffman
- Das Schwein – Eine deutsche Karriere (1995, TV miniseries), as Deterding
- 5 Stunden Angst – Geiselnahme im Kindergarten (1995, TV film, directed by Peter Keglevic), as Kommissar Haff
- Joseph (1995, TV film, directed by Roger Young), as Hamor
- Brennendes Herz (1995, directed by Peter Patzak)
- Ms. Bear (1997, directed by Paul Ziller), as Schroeder
- Latin Lover (1999, TV film, directed by Oskar Roehler), as Helmut Glaser
- Contaminated Man (2000, directed by Anthony Hickox), as Lead Detective
- Death Train to the Pacific (2001, TV film, directed by Hans Werner), as Jeremias
- Der Fürst und das Mädchen (2007, TV series, 9 episodes), as John Mc Gregor
- 8:28 AM (2010, directed by Christian Alvart), as Dr. Kugler
