= Tilli Breidenbach =

German actress and voice actress (1910–1994)

Tilli Breidenbach, also Tilly Breidenbach (2 August 1910 in Völklingen – 23 October 1994 in Munich) was a German voice actress and actress.

== Life ==
Breidenbach grew up in Cologne, where she initially studied German studies, Romance studies and art history after Abitur. She finally learned the acting profession at the acting school of the Cologne theatres.

After World War II, she was a member of the ensemble of the Darmstadt State Theatre, between 1948 and 1950 Breidenbach played at the Kiel State Theatre, engagements in Essen, Lucerne, at the Berlin Free Volksbühne, at the Hamburg Ernst Deutsch Theater, at the Schauspielhaus Zürich, at the Stadt- und Ateliertheater in Bern and at the Staatstheater Kassel.

From the 1960s onwards, Breidenbach appeared in numerous renowned television productions. She also appeared in guest roles in series such as Tatort, St. Pauli-Landungsbrücken, Auf Achse and Unsere Hagenbecks. In the animated series Maya the Honey Bee, Tilli Breidenbach was the spokeswoman for the spider Thekla, in the animated series Heidi as Peter's grandmother and in the Muppet Show as the dresser Hilda.

She became known to a wide audience through the role of Lydia Nolte in Hans W. Geißendörfer's family series Lindenstraße. Breidenbach played the character from episode 4 (first broadcast: 29 December 1985) to episode 370 (first broadcast: 3 January 1993). For health reasons, she was unable to continue her involvement with Lindenstraße, so the role of Lydia Nolte was recast by Ursula Ludwig from episode 410 (first broadcast: 10 October 1993).

Breidenbach died after a serious illness on 23 October 1994 in Munich at the age of 84. Her grave is in the Münchner Westfriedhof.

== Filmography (selection) ==
- 1964: Septembergewitter
- 1971: Der Pott
- 1972: Das Geheimnis der Mary Celeste
- 1974: Härte 10 (TV miniseries)
- 1974: Zündschnüre
- 1974: John Glückstadt
- 1975: Haus ohne Hüter
- 1976: Lobster - Stirb! (TV series)
- 1977: Auf Achse
- 1979: St. Pauli-Landungsbrücken - Das Geschenk (TV series)
- 1980: Die unsterblichen Methoden des Franz Josef Wanninger - Episode 75 Ein besonderer Saft (TV series)
- 1980: Tatort - Streifschuß
- 1980: Tatort - Herzjagd
- 1981: Collin
- 1982: Die Stunde des Löwen
- 1982: Die Krimistunde (TV series, episode 2, episode: "Schabernack mit einer alten Dame")
- 1982: Unheimliche Geschichten (TV series, episode 11) - Der eingemauerte Schrei
- 1983: Martin Luther
- 1984: Titanic – Nachspiel einer Katastrophe
- 1985: Alpine Fire
- 1985-1993: Lindenstraße (TV series)
- 1986: Wohin und zurück - Santa Fe

== Literature ==
- Hermann J. Huber: Langen Müller’s Schauspielerlexikon der Gegenwart. Deutschland. Österreich. Schweiz. Albert Langen - Georg Müller Verlag GmbH, Munich - Vienna 1986, ISBN 3-7844-2058-3, p. 113 as Tilly Breidenbach.
- C. Bernd Sucher (ed.): Theaterlexikon. Authors, directors, actors, dramaturges, stage designers, critics. By Christine Dössel and Marietta Piekenbrock with the collaboration of Jean-Claude Kuner and C. Bernd Sucher. 2nd edition. Deutscher Taschenbuch-Verlag, Munich 1999, ISBN 3-423-03322-3, p. 90.
