= Inga Abel =

German actress (1946–2000)

- Born: 7 July 1946; Düsseldorf, Germany
- Died: 27 May 2000 (aged 53); Düsseldorf, Germany
- Occupation: Actress

Inga Abel (7 July 1946 – 27 May 2000) was a German actress. She studied ballet and figure skating from the time she was eight. From the ages of 17 to 19 she was the second soloist in the Vienna Ice Revue. After that, she took acting lessons in her hometown of Düsseldorf and performed at Die Komödie Frankfurt, the Theater am Dom in Cologne, and at the Schloßhoftheater in Moers, among others. She went on to play the role of Dr. Eva-Maria Sperling on the ARD series Lindenstraße from 1992 to 2000.

== Death ==
Inga Abel died of breast cancer in Düsseldorf on 27 May 2000, aged 53. Hans W. Geißendörfer, the producer of Lindenstraße, on Inga Abel, the person and the actress: "She played her roles with precision, intelligence, understanding, and depth. Inga's ability, her honesty, boldness, and courage to face life will remain unforgettable."

== Filmography ==
=== Film ===
Year	Title	Role	Notes
1987	Lauf nach Haus, egal wohin	Barbara Smith	TV movie
1995	Entführung aus der Lindenstraße	Ulla Fink	TV movie

=== Television ===
Year	Title	Role	Notes
1995	Die Wache	Prau Ranzow	Episode: "Mensch bleiben"
1992–2000	Lindenstraße	Dr. Eva-Maria Sperling; Eva-Maria Sperling; Eva Marie Sperling	162 episodes
