= Vogeler =

Vogeler is a German surname. Notable people with the surname include:

- Heinrich Vogeler (1872–1942), German painter, designer, and architect
- Volker Vogeler (1930–2005), German film director and screenwriter
