= Schneeland =

- 2005 Sundance Film Festival movie poster
- Directed by: Hans W. Geissendörfer
- Written by: Hans W. Geissendörfer; Elisabeth Rynell (novel)
- Produced by: Hans W. Geissendörfer
- Starring: Thomas Kretschmann; Julia Jentsch
- Cinematography: Hans-Günther Bücking
- Edited by: Peter Przygodda; Oliver Grothoff
- Music by: Irmin Schmidt
- Distributed by: Concorde Filmverleih GmbH
- Release date: 20 January 2005
- Running time: 142 minutes
- Country: Germany
- Languages: German; Faroese

Schneeland (German: "Snowland") is a 2005 film written and directed by German filmmaker Hans W. Geissendörfer. Based on the novel Hohaj by Elisabeth Rynell, it depicts the devastation felt by Elizabeth (Maria Schrader), a woman who had lost her husband in a car crash and wants to leave her three young children to join him in death by wandering out into the snowy deserts of Lapland. As she wanders through the snow, Elizabeth discovers the story of Aron (Thomas Kretschmann) and Ina (Julia Jentsch), a couple who overcame dark secrets and over-controlling family members to be with each other.

Schneeland premiered in January 2005 at the Sundance Film Festival and was released nationwide in German later that month. At the Deutscher Filmpreis (German Film Awards) in 2005, it was nominated for four awards including Best Costume Design and Best Production Design. It won for Best Cinematography.

== Cast ==
- Thomas Kretschmann - Aron
- Julia Jentsch - Ina
- Ulrich Mühe - Knövel
- Maria Schrader - Elisabeth
- Oliver Stokowski - Salomon
- Ina Weisse - Helga
- Joachim Król - Rubert
