= Bernd Tauber =

German actor (born 1950)

Bernd Tauber (born 7 May 1950, Göppingen, West Germany) is a German actor. He is best known for his role as Navigator Kriechbaum in the 1981 film Das Boot.

In the mid-1980s, Tauber appeared on the TV show Lindenstraße as Benno Zimmermann, the first HIV-positive character in German television.

== Filmography ==
- Baker's Bread (1976) - Werner Wild
- Halbe-Halbe (1977) - Thomas Berger
- Theodor Chindler (1979, TV miniseries) - Emil Granowski
- As Far as the Eye Sees (1980) - Robert Lueg
- Auf Achse: Tommy's Trip (1980, TV series episode) - Tommy
- Das Boot (1981) - Kriechbaum - Chief Quartermaster-Navigator
- Reifenwechsel (1983, TV film) - Steve
- Lindenstraße (1985–1988, TV series, 85 episodes) - Benno Zimmermann
- Retouche (1987) - Wolf Rotter
- Boomerang Boomerang (1989) - Kommissar Egli
- Amaurose (1991)
- Gudrun (1992) - Albert
- Das merkwürdige Verhalten geschlechtsreifer Großstädter zur Paarungszeit (1998) - Kurt
- Paradise Mall (1999) - Worzig
- The State I Am In (2000) - Achim
- Gott ist tot (2003) - Walter
- The Puppet Grave Digger (2003) - Jakob Schlösser
- Blackout Journey (2004)
- Vinzent (2004) - Dr. Bernhard
- Fremde Haut (2005) - Beamter BAFL
- Die zwei Leben des Daniel Shore (2009) - Prof. Hübner
- Die Unbedingten (2009) - Heinrich Feister
- The Murder Farm (2009) - Bürgermeister
- Trash Detective (2015) - Rudi Nussbaum
