= Yankee Dudler =

1973 film

- Film poster
- ger: Verflucht dies Amerika
- Directed by: Volker Vogeler
- Screenplay by: Bernardo Fernández; Ulf Miehe; Volker Vogeler
- Story by: Bernardo Fernández; Ulf Miehe; Volker Vogeler
- Produced by: Elías Querejeta
- Cinematography: Luis Cuadrado
- Edited by: Pablo G. del Amo
- Music by: Luis de Pablo
- Production companies: Albatros Filmproduktion; Elías Querejeta Producciones Cinematográficas S.L.
- Distributed by: Filmverlag der Autoren; Mundial Films
- Release dates: 7 September 1973 (Germany); 5 May 1975 (Spain)
- Running time: 95 min
- Countries: Germany; Spain

Yankee Dudler (German: Verflucht dies Amerika) is a 1973 German-Spanish western film directed by Volker Vogeler, written by Ulf Miehe and Volker Vogeler, composed by Luis de Pablo and starred by Arthur Brauss, Francisco Algora and Joaquín Rodríguez.

== Cast ==
- Arthur Brauss as Sebastian Iennerwein
- Francisco Algora as Andreas Hofleitner
- Joaquín Rodríguez as Mathias Hofleitner
- Fred Stillkrauth as Petrus Kapuszka
- Sigi Graue as Josef Meyer 'El beato'
- Roberto Font as August Keller
- Eduardo Fajardo as Henry
- Tito García
- Luis Barboo as Sheriff Dave
- Ángel Álvarez
- Fernando Bilbao as Jack Brody
- Frank Braña as Guardia mudo
- William Berger as Doc Holliday, Elder's lover
- Geraldine Chaplin as Kate Elder
- Kiti Mánver as Lydia
- Xavier Larra as Sam Colt
- Mario Pardo
- Antonio Padilla as Burton
- Fernando Sánchez Polack
- Ketty de la Cámara
- Julián del Monte
- Alfonso de la Vega
- Julio Monje
- Kinoto
- Alicia Sánchez as Señorita
- Dan van Husen

== See also ==
- Jaider, der einsame Jäger (1971)
