= Marie-Luise Marjan =

German actress (born 1940)

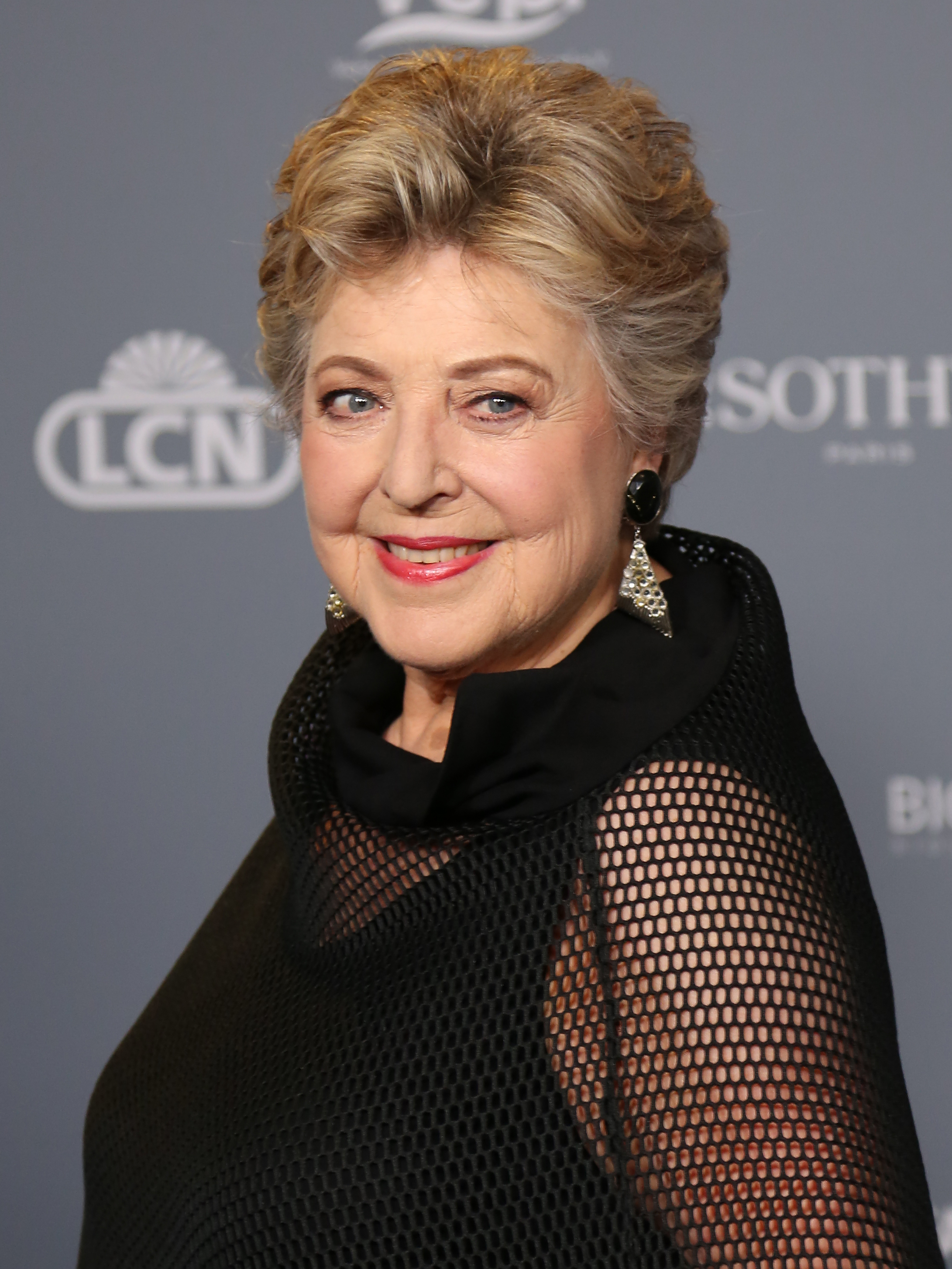
- Marjan in 2017
- Born: 9 August 1940; Essen
- Occupation: Actress
- Years active: 1973–present

Marie-Luise Marjan (born 9 August 1940) is a German actress.

After living for one year in an orphanage in Hattingen, she was adopted by the Lause family and given the name "Marlies".

Marjan is best known for her role as Helga Beimer in the German Television Series Lindenstraße (created by Hans W. Geißendörfer in 1985). She was the heroine in Wolfgang Petersen's drama Smog (1973) and appeared in films by Werner Schroeter (Palermo or Wolfsburg, Day of the Idiots) and Rainer Werner Fassbinder (Berlin Alexanderplatz).

In the German version of Murder, She Wrote, Immer wenn sie Krimis liest (1994), she has portrayed a detective, Anita De Winter, like Angela Lansbury. She played herself in the 1995 TV special Entführung aus der Lindenstraße. In Shrek 2 and Shrek 3 Marie-Luise Marjan is the German voice of Queen Lilian (Julie Andrews).

In 2010, she was presented with the Cross of Merit, First class of the Federal Cross of Merit. She studied acting with Eduard Marks at the Hochschule für Musik und Theater Hamburg.
