= Georg Uecker =

German actor (born 1962)

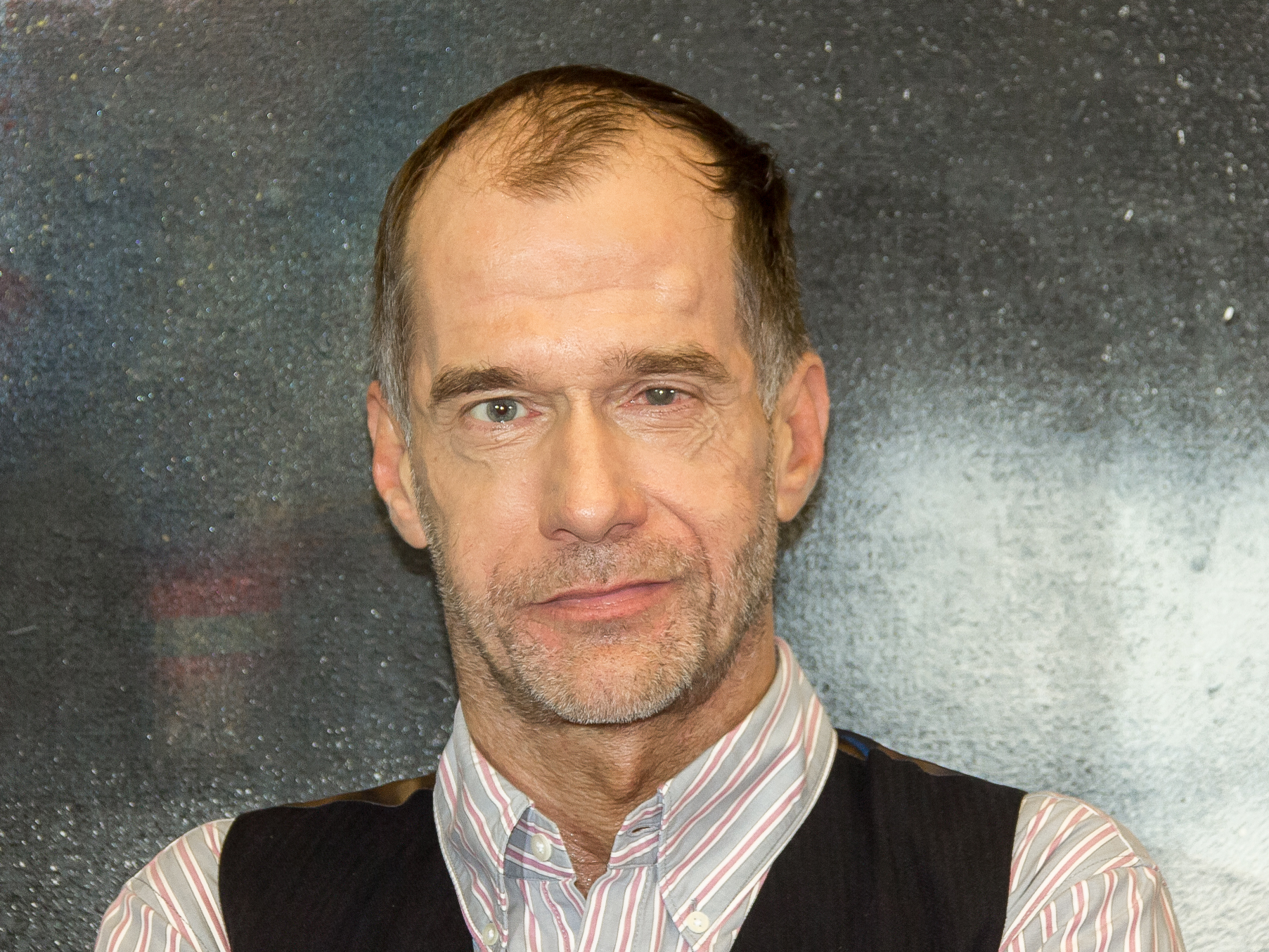
- Georg Uecker in 2015
- Born: 6 November 1962 (age 63); Munich, West Germany
- Occupation: Actor
- Years active: 1985-present

Georg Uecker (born 6 November 1962 in Munich) is a German actor. Since 1985, he has played the character of Dr. Carsten Flöter on the popular German TV series Lindenstraße on ARD. Controversially, in 1987, he kissed Gert Weinbauer (played by actor Günter Barton). This was the first gay kiss in a German series in the evening. A second kiss was in 1990 with character Robert Engel (actor Martin Armknecht) this brought about discussions on LGBT topics in the media. Uecker still continues to play the character. His other television credits include Schillerstraße (an improvisational comedy show) and he is often a guest on Genial daneben (a quiz programme with comedians). He is an LGBT-activist and lives in Cologne.

== Early life ==
Georg Uecker is the son of Heiko Uecker, who until 2004 was 'Professor of Nordic Philology' at the University of Bonn, and his wife Kari from Norway. He grew up bilingually and spent his childhood in Germany and Norway.

He joined a freelance theater group, which was invited to various arts festivals, this was a hobby that could be a profession. Uecker studied theatre and film, Scandinavian studies and Romance studies at the University of Cologne. He also took acting classes, played at the Comedia Theater in Cologne and started working at the Schauspielhaus. Then casting director Horst D. Scheel asked him to cast for the "Lindenstraße".

== Career ==
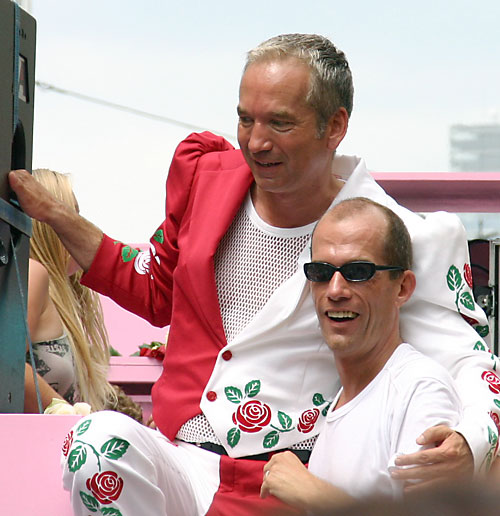
Georg Uecker (right) with Claus Vinçon at Christopher Street Day (a Pride Event) in Cologne, 2005

Uecker became known as Dr. Carsten Flöter in the television series Lindenstraße (translated as 'Linden Road'), where he kissed actor Günter Barton in 1987. It was the first kiss between two men on German television in an evening series. After a second kiss in 1990, with actor Martin Armknecht on the show, both actors received several anonymous death threats after the broadcast of the episode. The WDR and the Lindenstraße production company GFF then filed criminal charges against the unknown person. Uecker received the Bambi Award for his role in Lindenstraße in 1989 and the Golden Camera Award in 1998.

Uecker has been other television shows, such as a panel member of "Genial daneben" (lit. 'ingeniously off the mark'), he was the 'gamesmaster' known as 'The Whisperer' on the Schillerstraße until autumn 2005. He performs as a "Eurovision Song Contest expert" in various talk shows. Until 2005, he also produced the late night show Blond on Friday ('Blond am Freitag') on channel ZDF, and co-developed other ZDF channel shows such as "Kaffeeklatsch". He has worked alongside Hella von Sinnen, Ralph Morgenstern and Dirk Bach in 'Cologne Homopromis'.

== Filmography ==
=== Film ===
Film
Year	Title	Role	Notes
2003	Mutti - Der Film	Georg Uecker	

=== Television ===
Year	Title	Role	Notes
1986-2018	Lindenstraße	Carsten Flöter / Dr. Carsten Flöter	TV series, appeared in 611 episodes
1995	Entführung aus der Lindenstraße	Dietmar Ganz	(TV movie)
1996	Lukas	Ronald die Ratte	TV series, 1 episode
1999	Die Wache	Edgar Palm	TV series, 1 episode
2003	Zwei Profis	Martin Persch	TV series, 1 episode
2003-2006	Clueless Genius	(himself)	TV series, 31 episodes
2004	Familie Heinz Becker	Bargast	TV series, 1 episode
2005	Ewig rauschen die Gelder	Herr Brückner	(TV movie)
2006	Lindenstraße: Finstere Weihnacht	Dr. Carsten Flöter	(TV movie)
2006	Pastewka	Georg Uecker	TV series, 1 episode
2006	Verbotene Liebe	(Standesbeamter) Registrar Joachim Jung	TV series, 2 episodes
2008	Come In and Burn Out	Moderator Hans Peter Riedmann	TV series, 1 episode

== Personal life ==
Uecker is openly homosexual and involved in the gay rights movement, and was awarded in 2010 for his involvement in the fight against HIV and AIDS, the ReD Award (Reminders Day Award, which has been awarded annually since 2001 in Berlin). In addition, the actor is engaged politically and socially. Since September 4, 2007, he is godfather of the 'Oberstufenzentrums Trade 1' (a commercial high school in Berlin-Kreuzberg) in the project "School without racism - school with Courage" and since January 27, 2010 godfather of the project "Holzwickede without racism - Holzwickede with Courage".

In 1993, his partner John, an Englishman from London, "the great love", died of AIDS.

Since 2008, it was obvious that Uecker had health problems; especially as strong weight loss was observed. When Uecker made his HIV infection public in 2016, he explained that his illness was being reduced to the side effects of HIV blockers and he has since gained weight again by switching medication. According to his own information, he learned about the diagnosis in 1993. He is quoted as saying "I'm the prominent 'Longtime Survivor' ". In 1993, he was also battling against "Hodgkin's disease" which is, a malignant tumor of the lymphatic system. He had several chemotherapy treatments. Five years later, he had defeated the cancer, he states "I've been cancer-free for 25 years" in 2015.

He owns a boot from Frida of ABBA. He had traveled with Thomas Hermanns to an auction in Switzerland.

His autobiography "I'll do it!" was published by Fischer Verlag on 22 February 2018. (ISBN 978-3-596-70167-4)
