= Entführung aus der Lindenstraße =

- Genre: Comedy; Crime
- Written by: Christoph Wortberg
- Directed by: George Moorse
- Starring: Marie-Luise Marjan, Herbert Feuerstein
- Music by: Claudius Bruese
- Country of origin: Germany
- Original language: German

Production
- Producer: Hans W. Geißendörfer
- Editor: Helga Borsche
- Running time: 74 minutes

Original release
- Release: 1995

Entführung aus der Lindenstraße (meaning 'Kidnap from Linden Street') is a German television film directed by George Moorse. It was produced in 1995 to celebrate the tenth anniversary of the German television series Lindenstraße, and stars many cast members of that show.

== Plot ==
The ARD television series Lindenstraße is about to be cancelled after its ten-year run.

Obsessive Lindenstraße fan and head computer programmer of the GEZ, Detlef Hase (portrayed by Herbert Feuerstein) is distraught. He enters the production studio of the show posing as a tourist, sneaks backstage, and kidnaps the actress Marie-Luise Marjan (playing herself) at gunpoint. He calls her 'Helga' or 'Frau Beimer', her Lindenstraße stage-name, and is infatuated with her. He takes her to an unoccupied castle which belongs to a distant relative of his, and forces her to record a video stating that unless the show Lindenstraße is renewed, the record of all GEZ TV-licenses will be deleted. To prove his ability to carry out his threat, he deletes all data pertaining to the town Bad Schwartau. This however alerts the police to his identity, and after searching his apartment they find a map on which the location of the castle is marked.

Meanwhile, Marie-Luise begins to admire Hase, and is persuaded to support his attempt to save Lindenstraße. They manage to evade capture by the police and drive to the GEZ headquarters, where they lock themselves in the computer room. As the police break in and arrest him, Hase activates a computer virus that will automatically delete the GEZ data, and that can only be deactivated by him. As the virus continues to delete data, WDR director Fritz Pleitgen announces publicly that Lindenstraße will be re-commissioned, citing the public outcry over the proposed cancellation as the reason.

In the final scene, set several weeks later, Marie-Luise visits Hase in prison, and offers him an acting role on the show Lindenstraße after the completion of his custodial sentence.

== Cast ==
The protagonist Detlef Hase is portrayed by Herbert Feuerstein. Lindenstraße actress Marie-Luise Marjan and the then-director of WDR, Fritz Pleitgen, play themselves. Other fictional roles in Entführung aus der Lindenstraße are portrayed by cast members of Lindenstraße.

Actor	Role in Film	Role in Lindenstraße
Anna Teluren	Cleaner Maria Steiner / Government Minister Ms. Boose	Amélie von der Marwitz
Martin Rickelt	Janitor Alfred Pitschak	Franz Wittich
Bill Mockridge	GEZ-Supervisor Peter Rummler	Erich Schiller
Manfred Schwabe	GEZ-employee Hans Markowski	Matthias Steinbrück
Marie-Luise Marjan	herself	Helga Beimer
Willi Herren	Newspaper-seller	Olli Klatt
Annemarie Wendl	Gertrud Pleitgen (Mother of Intendant Fritz Pleitgen)	Else Kling
Helmut Ehmig	Janitor Hans Keller	Hilmar Eggers
Ute Mora	make-up artist Elfie Schlueter	Berta Griese
Nika von Altenstadt	Ingeborg Roll	Sonia Besirsky
Marianne Rogée	Tour-guide Agnes Pilz	Isolde Pavarotti
Petra Vieten	Interpreter Mrs. Mandrakis	Corinna Marx
Amorn Surangkanjanajai	Set visitor A. Korangunganajai	Gung Pham Kien
Ludwig Haas	Lindenstraße Director Walther Planck	Dr. Ludwig Dressler
Sybille Waury	Director's Assistant Ines von Falckenberg	Tanja Dressler
Andrea Spatzek	Margot Link	Gabi Zenker
Anna Nowak	Franziska Witsch	Urszula Winicki
Susanne Gannott	Theresa Oezguel	Beate Sarikakis
Guido Gagliardi	Sound- and cameraman Ferdi Schmitz	Enrico Pavarotti
Wolfgang Grönebaum	Sound- and cameraman Franz Keppler	Egon Kling
Moritz A. Sachs	Sound- and cameraman Ludwig Hintermoser	Klaus Beimer
Inga Abel	Ulla Fink	Eva-Maria Sperling
Tanja Schmitz	Gundi Strack (as Tanja Schmitz-Kemmerling)	Julia von der Marwitz
Sontje Peplow	Sandra Fromm	Lisa Hoffmeister
Knut Hinz	Commissioner Klaus Weber	Hans-Joachim Scholz
Joachim Hermann Luger	Police Officer Horst Braun	Hans Beimer
Domna Adamopoulou	Hildegard Knies	Elena Sarikakis
Philipp Neubauer	Police technician Heinz Wagner	Philipp Sperling
Jo Bolling	SEK Official Rudi Brant	Andi Zenker
Hermes Hodolides	SEK Official Alf Schroeder	Vasily Sarikakis
Irene Fischer	Police Psychologist Edeltraut Berger	Anna Ziegler
Carlos Werner	Friedrich Heinemann	Ernst-Hugo von Salen-Priesnitz
Michael Marwitz	Volker Lutz	Kurt Sperling
Nadine Spruß	Reporter	Valerie Zenker
Kostas Papanastasiou	Reporter	Panaiotis Sarikakis
Margret Van Munster	Homeless person	Rosi Koch
Robert Zimmerling	Homeless person	Hubert Koch
Steffen Gräbner	Helicopter pilot Harry Hansen	Dieter Rantzow
Marcus Off	Undersecretary Goetsch	Phil Seegers
Georg Uecker	Dietmar Ganz	Carsten Flöter
Rebecca Siemoneit-Barum	Reporter Uta Radtke	Iffi Zenker
Moritz Zielke	Reporter	Momo Sperling
Sigo Lorfeo	Justice Department Official Hans Koschinski	Paolo Varese

== References in the TV Show ==
Herbert Feuerstein appears in Episode 528 of Lindenstraße as a chimney sweep, and upon seeing Helga, addresses her by name and appears to hold her in veneration. This can be interpreted as the fulfilment of the conversation between Marie-Luise Marjan and Detlef Hase in the final scene of Entführung aus der Lindenstraße.

In episode 576 a clip from Entführung aus der Lindenstraße appears on television. Erich remarks to Helga: "Actually we could have saved ourselves the cable-TV fees – twenty-seven channels and there’s nothing on!"

== Certification ==
Entführung aus der Lindenstraße is rated FSK 6 - suitable for viewers of age 6 and above.
