= Angelo und Luzy =

- Also known as: Angelo and Luzy
- Country of origin: Germany

Original release
- Network: ZDF
- Release: May 12 – June 23, 1984

Angelo und Luzy (German: Angelo and Luzy) is a West German comedy television series broadcast on ZDF in six episodes in 1984. It starred Iris Berben (Luzy) and Rolf Zacher (Angelo) in the lead roles.

== See also ==
- List of German television series
