= The Sternstein Manor =

1976 film

- Directed by: Hans W. Geißendörfer
- Written by: Ludwig Anzengruber; Hans W. Geissendörfer
- Produced by: Luggi Waldleitner
- Starring: Katja Rupé; Peter Kern; Tilo Prückner
- Cinematography: Frank Brühne
- Release date: 16 March 1976
- Running time: 125 minutes
- Country: West Germany
- Language: German

The Sternstein Manor (German: Sternsteinhof) is a 1976 West German drama film directed by Hans W. Geißendörfer. It was entered into the 10th Moscow International Film Festival.

== Cast ==
- Katja Rupé as Leni Zinshofer
- Tilo Prückner as Nepomuk Kleebinder aka Muckerl
- Gustl Bayrhammer as Sternsteinhofbauer sen.
- Peter Kern as Toni Stadlhofer - Sternsteinhofbauer jr.
- Agnes Fink as Zinshoferin
- Elfriede Kuzmany as Kleebinderin
- Ulrike Luderer as Sepherl
- Irm Hermann as Sali
- Maria Stadler as Katel
- Horst Richter as Käsbiermartel
- Helmut Alimonta as Farm Hand
- Jürgen Schornagel as Priest
- Alfred Edel as Dr. Swoboda
