= Justice (1993 film) =

- Film poster
- Directed by: Hans W. Geißendörfer
- Written by: Hans W. Geißendörfer
- Produced by: Hans W. Geißendörfer
- Starring: Maximilian Schell
- Cinematography: Hans-Günther Bücking
- Edited by: Annette Dorn
- Music by: Frank Loef
- Release date: 14 October 1993
- Running time: 106 minutes
- Country: Germany
- Language: German

Justice (German: Justiz) is a 1993 German-language film directed by Hans W. Geißendörfer. It was an international co-production between Germany and Switzerland. Based on the 1985 novel The Execution of Justice by Friedrich Dürrenmatt, the film was chosen as Germany's official submission to the 66th Academy Awards for Best Foreign Language Film, but did not manage to receive a nomination.

== Plot ==
Isaak Kohler (Maximilian Schell) coolly walked up to a man everyone assumed was his friend and shot him dead. This took place in front of dozens of witnesses in a busy restaurant, and there was no question about his guilt. What he never revealed was his motive. He has been in prison serving a twenty-year sentence ever since. Perhaps in order to ease his daughter's pain about the incident, he has hired a legal representative to arrange for him to receive a retrial. He is still unforthcoming about his reasons for committing the crime, and invites the struggling lawyer to make something up. This crime and courtroom drama is based on a novel by Friedrich Dürrenmatt, whose works are highly respected within the German-speaking intellectual community but whose appeal has proved difficult to translate.

== Cast ==
- Maximilian Schell as Isaak Kohler
- Thomas Heinze as Felix Spat
- Anna Thalbach as Helene Kohler
- Mathias Gnädinger as Police Chief
- Norbert Schwientek as Stuessi-Leupin
- Ulrike Kriener as Ilse Freude
- Suzanne von Borsody as Daphne Winter
- Hark Bohm as Prof. Winter
- Carole Piguet as Monika Steigermann
- Diethelm Stix as Jaemmerlin
- Dietrich Siegl as Dr. Benno

== See also ==
- List of submissions to the 66th Academy Awards for Best Foreign Language Film
- List of German submissions for the Academy Award for Best Foreign Language Film
