= Toni Lüdi =

German art director and academic (born 1945)

- Born: January 6, 1945 (age 81); Taufkirchen, Germany
- Occupation: Art director
- Years active: 1972- (film & TV)

Toni Lüdi (born 1945) is a German art director and academic. Along with his wife Heidi Lüdi he established himself in the 1970s as one of the leading set designers of New German Cinema.

== Selected filmography ==
- Germany in Autumn (1978)
- Panic Time (1980)
- Der Preis fürs Überleben (1980)
- In the Heart of the Hurricane (1980)
- The Magic Mountain (1982)
- The Heartbreakers (1983)
- Edith's Diary (1983)
- Trauma (1984)

== Bibliography ==
- Hans-Michael Bock and Tim Bergfelder. The Concise Cinegraph: An Encyclopedia of German Cinema. Berghahn Books, 2009.
