= Apokal =

1971 film

- Directed by: Paul Anczykowski
- Written by: Paul Anczykowski
- Starring: Christof Nel
- Cinematography: Leander R. Loosen
- Music by: Peter Janssens
- Release date: May 1971
- Running time: 86 minutes
- Country: West Germany
- Language: German

Apokal is a 1971 West German drama film directed by Paul Anczykowski. It was entered into the 1971 Cannes Film Festival.

== Cast ==
- Christof Nel as Carmann
- Rotraut de Nève as Catinka
- Heinrich Clasing as Painter
- Dorit Amann as Gala
- Cornelia Niemann as Pila
- Inken Sommer as Lucia
- Tilo Prückner as Miles
- Heinrich Giskes as Ariel
- Ernst Kottenstedte
- Manfred Günther
