= Christoph Eichhorn =

German television actor and director

Christoph Eichhorn (born 8 September 1957 in Kassel, West Germany) is a German television actor and director.

== Life ==
He is the son of German actor Werner Eichhorn. From 1972 to 1977 Eichhorn worked as actor at Schauspielhaus Bochum. As film actor he played in various films. In February 2021, Eichhorn came out as gay.

== Selected filmography ==
=== Actor ===
- 1973: The Tenderness of Wolves
- 1979: Ein Kapitel für sich (TV miniseries)
- 1979: Neonschatten (TV film)
- 1980: Kaiserhofstraße 12 (TV film)
- 1980: Luftwaffenhelfer (TV film)
- 1981: Exil (TV miniseries)
- 1982: Die Chance (Short)
- 1982: The Magic Mountain
- 1983: Kiez
- 1985: Westler
- 1985: Die Frau mit den Karfunkelsteinen (TV film)
- 1986: Peter the Great (TV miniseries)
- 1987: Kunyonga: Murder in Africa
- 1988: The Vulture Wally
- 1989: Joan of Arc of Mongolia
- 1989: The Dancing Girl (舞姫)
- 1989: Hard Days, Hard Nights
- 1990: The Plot to Kill Hitler
- 1991: Ende der Unschuld (TV film)
- 1991: Begräbnis einer Gräfin (TV film)
- 1993: Just a Matter of Duty
- 1993: Rosenemil
- 1994: Tödliches Erbe (TV film)
- 1995: Großstadtrevier (TV series, 4 episodes)
- 1996: The Secret of Sagal (TV series)
- 1985–1995: Derrick (TV series, 8 episodes)
- 1978–1996: The Old Fox (TV series, 6 episodes)
- 2000: Escape to Life: The Erika and Klaus Mann Story

=== Director ===
- 1982: Die Chance
- 1988: Der Weg zum Ruhm
- 1989: Jenseits von Blau
- 1995: Der Mann auf der Bettkante
- 1996: Alarm für Cobra 11 – Die Autobahnpolizei (TV series)
- 1998: Im Namen des Gesetzes (TV series)
- 2001: Die Kumpel (TV series)
- 2002: Denninger – Der Mallorcakrimi (TV series)
- 2002–2003: Balko (TV series)
- 2007–2010: Ein Fall für Zwei (TV series)
- 2007–2010: Krimi.de/Erfurt (TV series)
- 2007–2009: Leipzig Homicide (TV series)
- 2010: Stuttgart Homicide (TV series)
- 2010: Cologne P.D. (TV series)
- 2022: Auf den Hund gekommen (TV film)
