= Heidi Lüdi =

Swiss art director (born 1949)

- Born: May 31, 1949 (age 76); Basel, Switzerland
- Occupation: Art director
- Years active: 1970- (film & TV)

Heidi Lüdi (born 1949) is a Swiss art director known for her work in New German Cinema. She is married to fellow set designer Toni Lüdi with whom she has often collaborated.

== Selected filmography ==
- The Glass Cell (1978)
- Knife in the Head (1978)
- In the Heart of the Hurricane (1980)
- The Magic Mountain (1982)
- Wings of Desire (1987)

== Bibliography ==
- Hans-Michael Bock and Tim Bergfelder. The Concise Cinegraph: An Encyclopedia of German Cinema. Berghahn Books, 2009.
