= John Glückstadt =

1975 film

- Directed by: Ulf Miehe
- Written by: Ulf Miehe; Walter Fritzsche; Theodor Storm (novella Ein Doppelgänger)
- Starring: Dieter Laser
- Cinematography: Jürgen Jürges
- Edited by: Heidi Genée
- Release date: 22 August 1975
- Running time: 94 minutes
- Country: West Germany
- Language: German

John Glückstadt is a 1975 West German drama film directed by Ulf Miehe. It was entered into the 25th Berlin International Film Festival.

== Cast ==
- Dieter Laser as John Hansen "Glückstadt"
- Marie-Christine Barrault as Hanna Hansen
- Johannes Schaaf as Bügermeister
- Dan van Husen as Wenzel
- Tilo Prückner as Michel
- Juliette Wendelken as Christine Hansen
- Tilli Breidenbach as Mariken
- Rudolf Beiswanger as Nachbar Tischler
