= Jaider, der einsame Jäger =

1971 film

- Directed by: Volker Vogeler
- Written by: Volker Vogeler; Ulf Miehe
- Starring: Gottfried John
- Cinematography: Gérard Vandenberg
- Release date: 1971
- Running time: 94 minutes
- Country: West Germany
- Language: German

Jaider, der einsame Jäger ("Jaider, the lonely hunter") is a 1971 Bavarian Western film directed by Volker Vogeler. It was entered into the 21st Berlin International Film Festival. It was the film debut of Gottfried John, and his screen presence was compared to Clint Eastwood.

== Cast ==
- Gottfried John as Jaider
- Rolf Zacher as Baptist Meyer
- Sigi Graue as Georg
- Louis Waldon as Der Invalide
- Johannes Schaaf as Landl-Doktor
- Arthur Brauss as Bastian (as Art Brauss)
- Katharina Lopinski as Tochter des Grafen
- Helga Asenbaum as Frau des Doktors
- Ulrich Haß as Beter
- Claus Theo Gärtner as Anderl
- Joachim Regelien as Mathias
- Fred Stillkrauth as Petrus
- Erich Ude as Oberst
- Anfried Krämer as Graf
- Krischa Huber as Magd
- Minu Kjuder as Agnes

== See also ==
- Yankee Dudler (1973)

== Bibliography ==
- von Moltke, Johannes (6 September 2005). No Place Like Home: Locations of Heimat in German Cinema. University of California Press. p. 302. ISBN 978-0-520-24411-5.
