= Herbert Feuerstein =

German comedian and journalist (1937–2020)

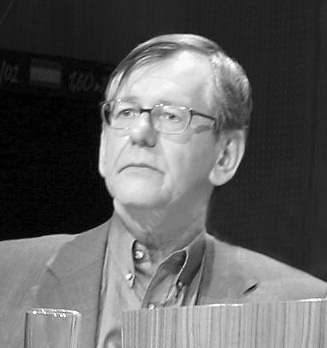
- Herbert Feuerstein in 2005.
- Born: 15 June 1937; Zell am See, Federal State of Austria
- Died: 6 October 2020 (aged 83); Erftstadt, Germany
- Occupation: Comedian
- Years active: 1960–2020
- Awards: Bambi Award

Herbert Feuerstein (15 June 1937 – 6 October 2020) was a German journalist, comedian and entertainer of Austrian descent. He was known as a publisher of the pardon satire magazine, as the editor of the German version of Mad, and for comedy work on television, especially as a partner to Harald Schmidt in shows such as Schmidteinander.

== Life ==
Feuerstein was born in Zell am See, Austria, and studied piano, harpsichord and composition at the Salzburg Mozarteum from 1956 to 1958. He was expelled for insulting the institute's president. In 1960, he followed his girlfriend, a guest student from Hawaii, to New York where they got married. There, he worked as a journalist, from 1968 as editor of the German-language newspaper New Yorker Staats-Zeitung, and as correspondent for several German and Austrian media, including the German satire magazine pardon. He also worked in the press department of the Austrian consulate.

After divorcing his first wife, Feuerstein returned to Europe in 1969. He worked as a director of the publishing house Bärmeier & Nikel which produced pardon among others. In 1973, he became the editor of the German version of Mad increasing the circulation from 10,000 to 400,000.

Since 1984, he mainly worked in German TV, being partner to Harald Schmidt in comedy shows such as Pssst... (1989–1995) and Schmidteinander (1990–1994). In 1994, he received the Bambi television award for creativity, for "anarchistische Originalität" (anarchic originality) and "hemmungslosen Mut zum Chaos" (uninhibited courage for chaos). He then left the show.

In 1995, he starred in the TV film Entführung aus der Lindenstraße. Twice, in 1997 and 1998, he hosted twelve-hour-long live TV shows, dubbed Feuersteins Nacht (Feuerstein's Night), for WDR. He also worked as the dub voice of Gilbert Huph – to whom he bore a striking optical resemblance – in the German-language version of Pixar's The Incredibles. He appeared on stage, especially as Frosch in Die Fledermaus by Johann Strauss, 75 times at the Cologne Opera between 2004 and 2008.

A native Austrian, he became a German citizen in 1990. Feuerstein died in Erftstadt aged 83.
