= Wolfgang Grönebaum =

German actor

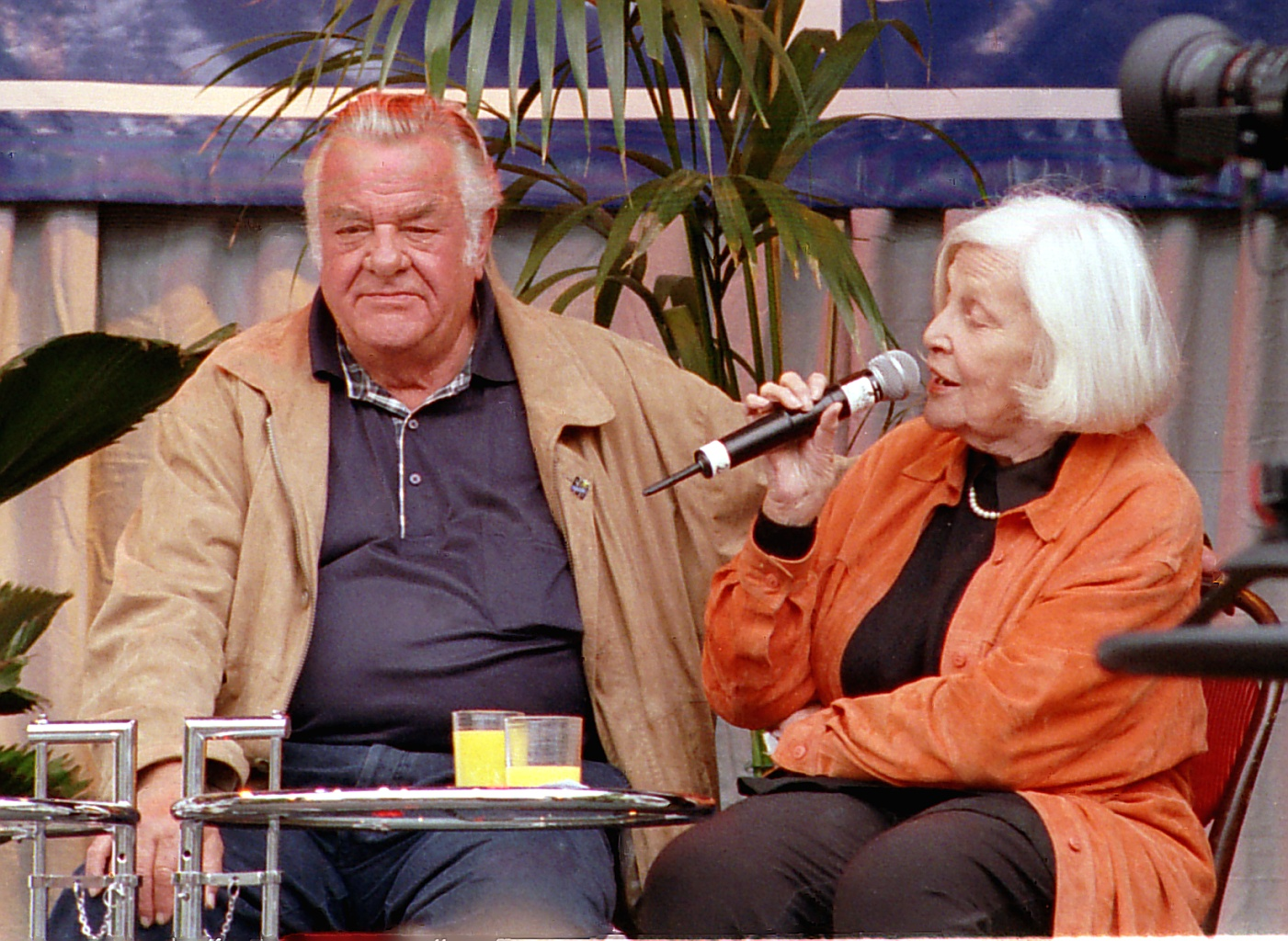
- Wolfgang Grönebaum and Annemarie Wendl
- Born: 14 March 1927; Grabs, Switzerland
- Died: 16 March 1998 (aged 71); Gummersbach, Germany
- Occupation: Actor
- Years active: 1968-1998

Wolfgang Grönebaum (14 March 1927 – 16 March 1998) was a German actor. He appeared in 26 films and television shows between 1968 and 1998.

== Selected filmography ==
- The Willi Busch Report (1979)
- Entführung aus der Lindenstraße (1995)
