= Carlos (1971 film) =

1971 film

- Directed by: Hans W. Geißendörfer
- Screenplay by: Hans W. Geißendörfer; Bernd Fiedler
- Based on: Don Carlos by Friedrich Schiller
- Produced by: Ernst Liesenhoff; Hellmut Haffner; Günther Witte
- Starring: Gottfried John; Anna Karina
- Cinematography: Robby Müller
- Edited by: Wolfgang Hedinger
- Music by: Ernst Brandner
- Production companies: Iduna Film; BR; WDR
- Release date: 23 November 1971
- Running time: 107 minutes
- Country: West Germany
- Language: German

Carlos is a 1971 West German Western television film, which has transplanted the story of Friedrich Schiller's play Don Carlos from 16th century Spain to a 1915 American Western style environment. According to some, the setting should be somewhere in southern Europe, while others claim it is somewhere in the southwestern United States. Due to complicated contracts and shooting problems, it never had the theatrical release that was intended, and was instead shown on German TV.

It was directed by Hans W. Geißendörfer, who also wrote the screenplay, and stars Gottfried John and Anna Karina. The film was shot in Eilat in Israel, with several Israelis participating in smaller roles and as extras.

== Cast ==
- Bernhard Wicki as Philipp
- Gottfried John as Carlos
- Anna Karina as Clara
- Geraldine Chaplin as Lisa
- Horst Frank as Ligo
- Thomas Hunter as Pedro
- Sabi Dorr as Enrico (as Sabi Dor)
- Ebba Kaiser
- Lorenza Colville as Roswitha
- Shaike Ophir as Domingo
- Reuven Shefer as Tassos
- Shmuel Wolf as Mönch
- Joseph Shiloach as Mario (as Yossi Shiloah)
- Leon Charney as Col
