= The Execution of Justice =

1985 novel by Friedrich Dürrenmatt

- First edition
- Author: Friedrich Dürrenmatt
- Original title: Justiz
- Translator: John E. Woods
- Language: German
- Genre: Fiction novel
- Publisher: Diogenes Verlag
- Publication date: 1985
- Publication place: Switzerland
- English publication date: 1989
- Pages: 369
- ISBN: 3-257-01692-1

The Execution of Justice (German: Justiz) is a 1985 novel by the Swiss writer Friedrich Dürrenmatt. It tells the story of an attorney who is tasked to reinvestigate a man sentenced for murder. The book criticises elements of the legal system and ponders on the nature of justice. It was adapted into the 1993 film Justice, directed by Hans W. Geißendörfer.

== Reception ==
Ursula Hegi reviewed the book in the Los Angeles Times: "Durrenmatt focuses more on politics than on the characters who play bizarre roles in the machinery of Swiss justice. He is highly critical of his country that 'withdrew from history when it went into big business. . . . Our country's ideals were always practical ones . . . an immoral but healthy way of life.' He looks at pompous manners and traditions, at corruption so smooth that it has worked its way into everyday life." Hegi wrote about the plot: "As the murder is reinvestigated, the act of violence is removed from theory, and only the theory is dealt with--a clean, passionless residue that has less and less to do with the crime. And this is what happens to justice too--it becomes detached from its source, loses its reason for being and exhausts itself in a game." The critic also wrote: "Despite his focus on politics, Durrenmatt has the gift to create unforgettable characters within a few lines".

== See also ==
- 1985 in literature
- Swiss literature
