= Auf den Hund gekommen =

- Frühling episode
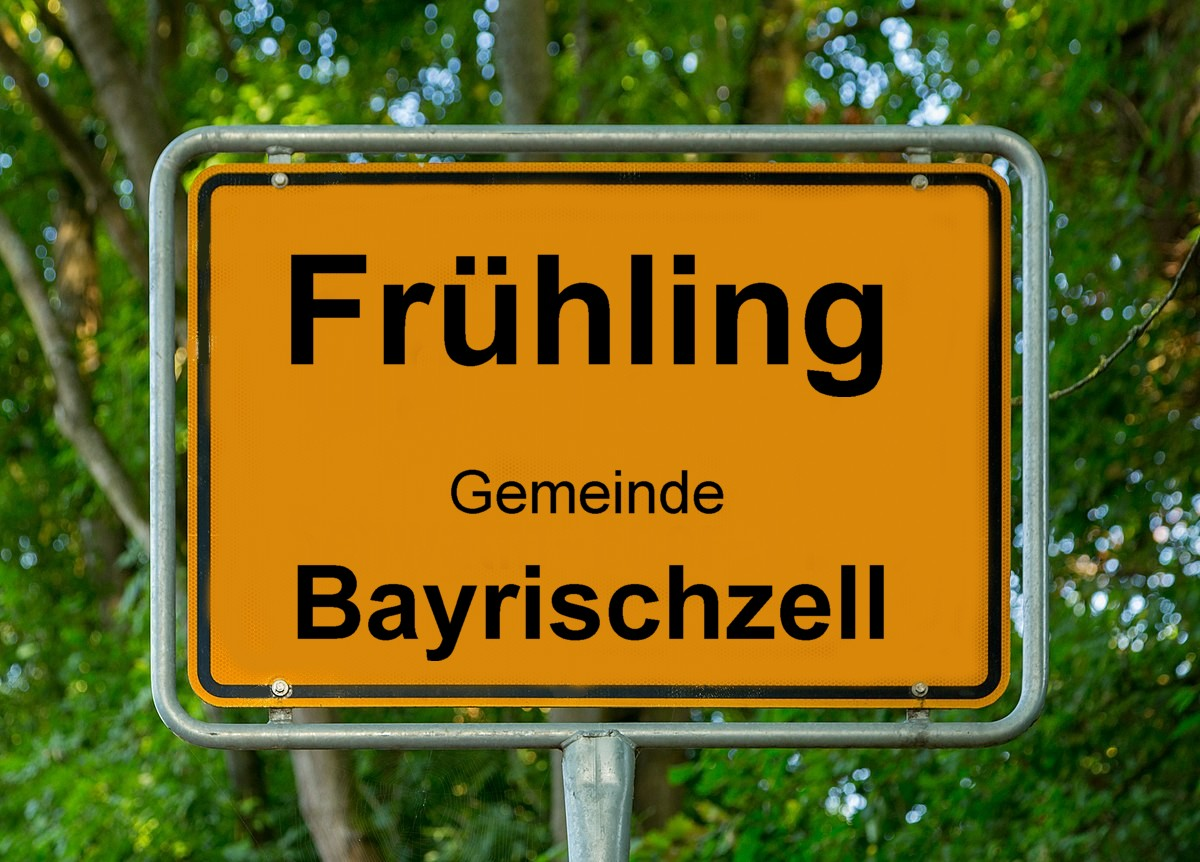
- Episode no.: Season 11; Episode 1
- Directed by: Christoph Eichhorn
- Story by: Natalie Scharf
- Editing by: Corina Dietz-Heyne
- Original air date: January 30, 2022
- Running time: 89 minutes

Episode chronology
← Previous "Weihnachtsgrüße aus dem Himmel"	Next → "An einem Tag im April"

"Auf den Hund gekommen" (English: "Thrown to the Dogs") is a German television film from the Frühling series. Directed by Christoph Eichhorn, it was first aired on January 30, 2022, on the ZDF.

The film tells the story of the farmhand Katja Baumann, played by German actress Simone Thomalla, who assists families in emergency situations and, at the same time, attempts to fill their hearts with the spirit of spring. It is the 33rd film in a series that is centered on the people living within the eponymous, fictitious town known as Frühling.

== Plot ==
A new challenge awaits the farmhand Katja Baumann, as the owner of a dog hotel in town needs help. Anton Lachner, after collapsing unconscious, must be operated on at the hospital. However, all fifteen dogs that were in his care fled and are now making a stir throughout Frühling. Katja is called upon to take his place and packs her bags, since the job will take much up much of her time. Adrian, who still mourns the passing of his father, must leave her alone. She finds this difficult personally, as he is in danger of falling into a computer addiction as a way of coping with his grief.

On the way to work, Katja comes across a confused young man who believes he ran over a dog. Katja, however, sees no evidence of an accident, but, nevertheless, she helps him look, in the meantime informing the town's pastor, Sonnleitner, of the strange occurrence. After a fruitless search, Katja begins her work, as the police successfully bring the first captured dog to the local boarding kennel. The remaining dogs are found the next day, and Katja wants to inform the young man from before that he had not ran over anything. His name is Simon Fries, according to the name found with his address, and so she decides to pay him a visit.

Initially, the young man is reluctant to speak with Katja, but eventually allows her to enter his home. The interior strikes her as just as outlandish as Simon Fries himself. Somehow, time seems to have come to a standstill here, the home filled with antiquated furniture, including wallpaper and curtains, as well as old family paintings. He speaks of visions that he has had where things had jumped at him from the street: humans and animals that were supposedly waiting on the sides of the road. Katja suggests that he seek treatment, but this seems to trigger trauma in him, causing Simon to threaten her with a knife and lock her in the basement. The man then takes her car, where she had left her cellphone, and drives it to a remote road outside of town, leaving the vehicle and walking back on foot.

None of the townsfolk in Frühling are able to reach Katja or know where she could have gone. Both Lilly and the pastor, Sonnleitner, in particular, are very worried. As people who went to look for her eventually locate her stolen car, the police were informed, and the pastor remembers Katja's remark about the odd young man. With this information, the police approach Simon's home and are forced to break through the door. Intimidated, he immediately surrenders to the police and is taken to the local clinic's psychiatric facility. Katja, meanwhile, is thankful that the nightmare has ended and that she is safe once again.

== Production notes ==
The episode was produced by the ZDF, working alongside "Seven Dogs Filmproduktion" (English: "Seven Dogs Productions") and UFA Fiction. Filming ran from April 27 to June 24, 2021 in Bayrischzell, a municipality located in Miesbach, Germany. One of the primary shooting locations was the "Cafe Huber" in Bayrischzell, as well as the health clinic in Thiersee, Austria and several locales throughout See, Austria itself.
