= Lenz (1971 film) =

1971 film

- Directed by: George Moorse
- Screenplay by: George Moorse
- Produced by: Barbara Moorse
- Starring: Michael König; Louis Waldon; Rolf Zacher
- Cinematography: Gérard Vandenberg
- Edited by: Christa Wernicke
- Music by: David Llewellyn
- Release date: 1971
- Language: German

Lenz is a 1971 West German drama film written and directed by George Moorse. It was screened at the 32nd edition of the Venice Film Festival.

It won three German Film Awards, for best feature film, best cinematography and best performance (to Michael König).

== Cast ==
- Michael König as Lenz
- Louis Waldon as Reverend Oberlin
- Rolf Zacher as Kaufmann
- Sigurd Bischoff
- Grischa Huber
- Monika Maurer
- Elke Koska
