= Fred Stillkrauth =

German actor (1939–2020)

Fred Stillkrauth (1939 – 7 August 2020) was a German actor, perhaps best known for his work in Sam Peckinpah's Cross of Iron.

Fred Stillkrauth was born in 1939 in Munich, Germany, and died on 7 August 2020.

== Filmography ==
Stillkrauth played roles, mostly supporting roles, in films and television series, including:

Year	Title	Role	Notes
1971	Jaider, der einsame Jäger	Petrus	
1973	Yankee Dudler	Petrus Kapuszka	
1975	Champagner aus dem Knobelbecher	Anderl	
1975	Hugs and Other Things	Sebastian	
1977	Cross of Iron	Unteroffizier (Cpl.) Schnurrbart ('Private Mustache')	
1979	Zwei Däninnen in Lederhosen	Sepp Eber	
1979	Zum Gasthof der spritzigen Mädchen	Wachtmeister Lippel	
1980	Der Kurpfuscher und seine fixen Töchter	Adolf Schober	
1980	Three Lederhosen in St. Tropez	Korbinian Zangerl	
1987	Hatschipuh	Hatschipuh	Voice
1989	Löwengrube – Die Grandauers und ihre Zeit	Lederer	TV series
1990	The Nasty Girl	Sonja's uncle	
1991	Wildfire	Einarmiger Bauer	
2006	Wie Licht schmeckt	Opa	
2011	Resturlaub	Seppelpeter	
2012	Omamamia	Alois	
2015	Lena Lorenz	Leopold Lorenz	TV series
