= Gudrun (1992 film) =

1992 film

- Directed by: Hans W. Geißendörfer
- Written by: Fitzgerald Kusz; Hans W. Geißendörfer
- Produced by: Jan Balzer
- Starring: Kerstin Gmelch
- Cinematography: Hans-Günther Bücking
- Edited by: Annette Dorn
- Release date: February 1992
- Running time: 97 minutes
- Country: Germany
- Language: German

Gudrun is a 1992 German drama film directed by Hans W. Geißendörfer. It was entered into the 42nd Berlin International Film Festival where it won an Honourable Mention.

== Cast ==
- Kerstin Gmelch as Gudrun
- Barbara Thummet as Sophie
- Roman Mitterer as Fritz
- Veronika Freimanová as Lotte
- Bernd Tauber as Albert
- Michael Vogtmann as Zagel
- Walter Kraus as OGL
