= George Moorse =

American film director (1936–1999)

- Born: May 1, 1936; Bellmore, New York, United States
- Died: July 30, 1999 (aged 63); Cologne, Germany
- Occupation: Film director

George Moorse (May 1, 1936, Bellmore, New York – July 30, 1999, Cologne) was an American film director who worked and lived in Germany.

Moorse was educated at Hofstra College and at Washington Square College in New York. He began his work in Germany as a screenwriter, including writing for Peter Lilienthal (Claire). He was considered one of the leading directors of the Junge Deutsche film movement and worked on the television series Anderland. He directed the films The Cuckoo Years (1967) and The Foundling (1967, after the novel by Heinrich von Kleist). He won the Bundesfilmpreise for his short film In Side Out (1965) and the feature film Lenz (1971). In 1971, he also shot the horror TV film Vampira, notable for its Tangerine Dream sound track.

Moorse filmed Peter Zadek's works for television and achieved particular popularity as a director of 186 episodes of the cult series Lindenstraße, for which he worked on until his death. He also directed the 1995 film Entführung aus der Lindenstraße.

Moorse died in 1999 of a heart attack.

In memory of Moorse, the ice cream parlor in the series Lindenstraße was first named "Café Moorse" and, since mid-2009, "Café George".

== Filmography (selection) ==
- 1967: The Foundling (TV film)
- 1967: The Cuckoo Years
- 1968: Der Griller (TV film)
- 1968: Liebe und so weiter
- 1971: Lenz
- 1971: Vampira (TV film)
- 1973: Pan
- 1973: Inki
- 1974: Schattenreiter
- 1980: Daniel
- 1982: Brandmale
- 1995: Entführung aus der Lindenstraße (TV film)
