= The Willi Busch Report =

1979 film

- Directed by: Niklaus Schilling
- Written by: Niklaus Schilling
- Produced by: Elke Haltaufderheide
- Starring: Tilo Prückner
- Cinematography: Wolfgang Dickmann
- Edited by: Niklaus Schilling
- Release date: 1979
- Running time: 120 minutes
- Country: Germany
- Language: German

The Willi Busch Report (German: Der Willi-Busch-Report) is a 1979 German drama film directed by Niklaus Schilling. It competed in the Un Certain Regard section at the 1980 Cannes Film Festival.

== Cast ==
- Tilo Prückner - Willi Busch
- Kornelia Boje - Rose-Marie Roth
- Dorothea Moritz - Adelheid Busch
- Karin Frey - Helga
- Jenny Thelen - Aenne
- Hannes Kaetner - Sir Henry
- Klaus Hoser - Arno Rösler
- Hildegard Friese - Tante
- Wolfgang Grönebaum - Jupp Müller
- Christoph Lindert - Poradzki
- Horst Nowack - Unterhalter
- Karl Sibold - Rektor
- Hans-Jürgen Leuthen - Bürgermeister
- Horst Pasderski - Gerlach
- Elisabeth Bertram - Ehefrau
- Willy Meyer-Fuerst - Ehemann
- Carola Ehrsam - Wunderkind
