= The Magic Mountain (1982 film) =

- Directed by: Hans W. Geißendörfer
- Written by: Hans W. Geissendörfer
- Produced by: Francesco Casali; Wolfgang Patzschke; Renzo Rossellini; Franz Seitz
- Starring: Christoph Eichhorn; Marie-France Pisier; Rod Steiger; Charles Aznavour
- Cinematography: Michael Ballhaus
- Edited by: Helga Borsche; Peter Przygodda
- Music by: Jürgen Knieper
- Production companies: France 3 Franz Seitz Filmproduktion; Gaumont; Iduna Film Produktiongesellschaft; Opera Film Produzione; Zweites Deutsches Fernsehen; Österreichischer Rundfunk
- Distributed by: United Artists (West Germany); Gaumont (France)
- Release date: 25 February 1982
- Running time: 153 minutes
- Countries: Austria; Italy; France; West Germany
- Language: German

The Magic Mountain (German: Der Zauberberg) is a 1982 drama film directed by Hans W. Geißendörfer and starring Christoph Eichhorn, Rod Steiger and Marie-France Pisier. An adaptation of Thomas Mann's 1924 novel The Magic Mountain, it was made as a co-production between Austria, Italy, France and West Germany.

It was shot at the Tempelhof Studios in Berlin and at a variety of locations, many of them in Switzerland. The sets were designed by the art directors Heidi Lüdi and Toni Lüdi.

== Cast ==
- Christoph Eichhorn as Hans Castorp
- Marie-France Pisier as Claudia Chauchat
- Rod Steiger as Mynheer Peperkorn
- Charles Aznavour as Naphta
- Flavio Bucci as Ludovico Settembrini
- Hans Christian Blech as Hofrat Dr. Behrens
- Alexander Radszun as Joachim Ziemssen
- Margot Hielscher as Karoline Stöhr
- Gudrun Gabriel as Fräulein Marusja
- Irm Hermann as Fräulein Engelhart
- Ann Zacharias as Fräulein Elly
- Rolf Zacher as Herr Wehsal
- Kurt Raab as Dr. Edhin Krokowski
- Leslie Malton as Hermine Kleefeld
- Helmut Griem as James Tienappel

== Bibliography ==
- Bock, Hans-Michael & Bergfelder, Tim. The Concise CineGraph. Encyclopedia of German Cinema. Berghahn Books, 2009.
