= Theater Oberhausen =

Theatre in Oberhausen, North Rhine-Westphalia, Germany

Coordinates: 51°28′34″N 6°51′38″E

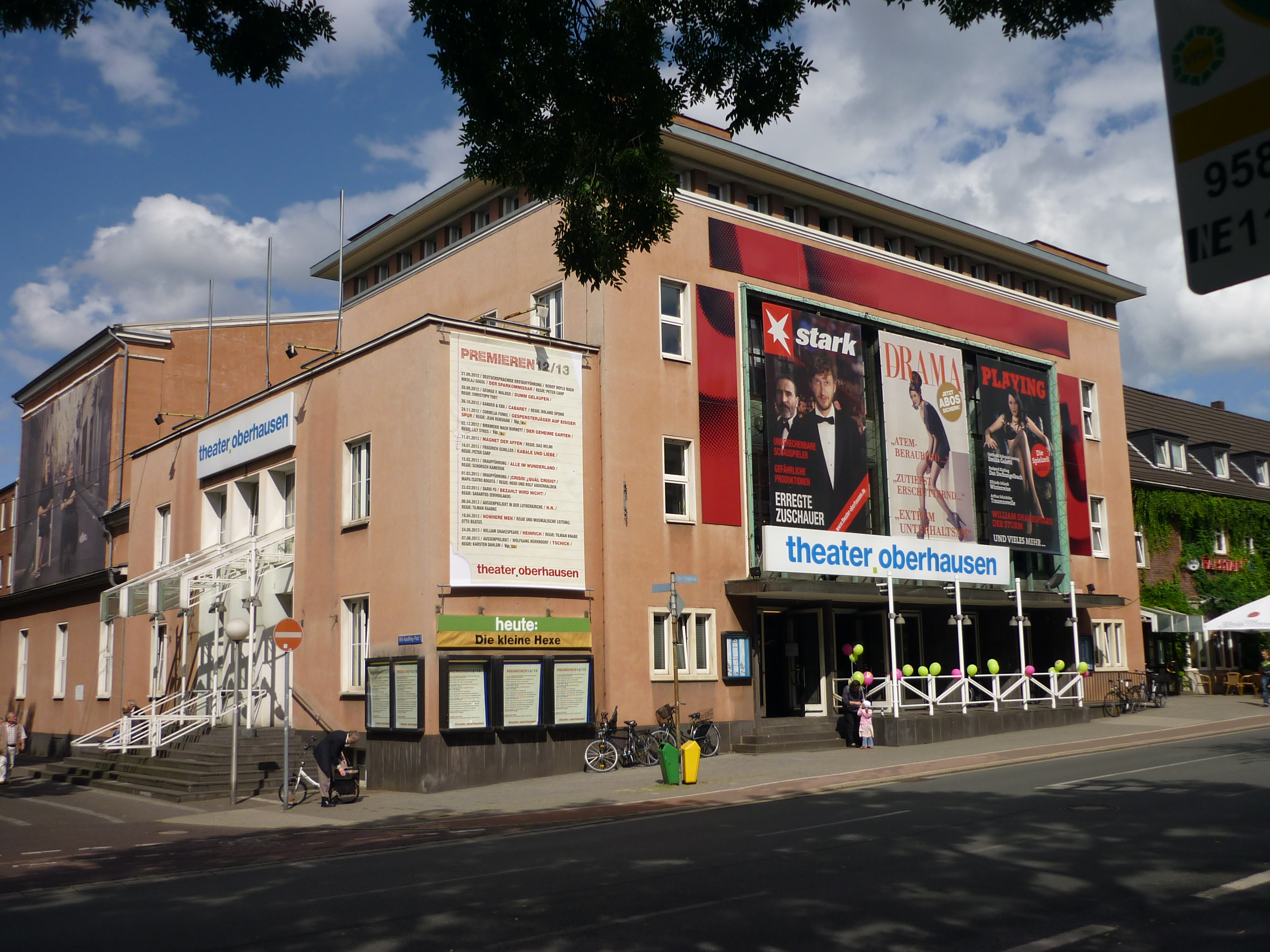
Theater Oberhausen, August 2012

Theater Oberhausen is a theatre in Oberhausen, North Rhine-Westphalia, Germany.
