= Jonathan (1970 film) =

- Directed by: Hans W. Geißendörfer
- Written by: Hans W. Geißendörfer
- Based on: Dracula by Bram Stoker
- Produced by: Hellmut Haffner
- Starring: Jürgen Jung; Hans-Dieter Jendreyko; Paul Albert Krumm; Hertha von Walther; Oskar von Schab; Thomas Astan
- Cinematography: Robby Müller
- Edited by: Wolfgang Hedinger
- Music by: Roland Kovač
- Production company: Iduna Film
- Distributed by: Atlas Film GmbH
- Release date: May 17, 1970 (West Germany)
- Running time: 97 minutes
- Country: West Germany
- Language: German

Jonathan is a 1970 West German vampire horror film directed by Hans W. Geißendörfer. The film stars Jürgen Jung, Hans-Dieter Jendreyko, Paul Albert Krumm, Hertha von Walther and Oskar von Schab.

== Synopsis ==
The world of the 19th century has been taken over by vampires who are immune to sunlight. Human rebels band together for a battle of life and the control of civilization.

== Release ==
Jonathan was released on 17 May 1970 in West Germany. Director Hans W. Geißendörfer won the Film Award in Gold at the Deutscher Filmpreis for Best New Direction for his work on Jonathan.

== Notes ==
=== References ===
- Browning, John Edgar; Picart, Caroline Joan (2010). Dracula in Visual Media:Film, Television, Comic Book and Electronic Game Appearances, 1921–2010. McFarland. ISBN 978-0-7864-3365-0.
