= Elisabeth Rynell =

Swedish poet and novelist

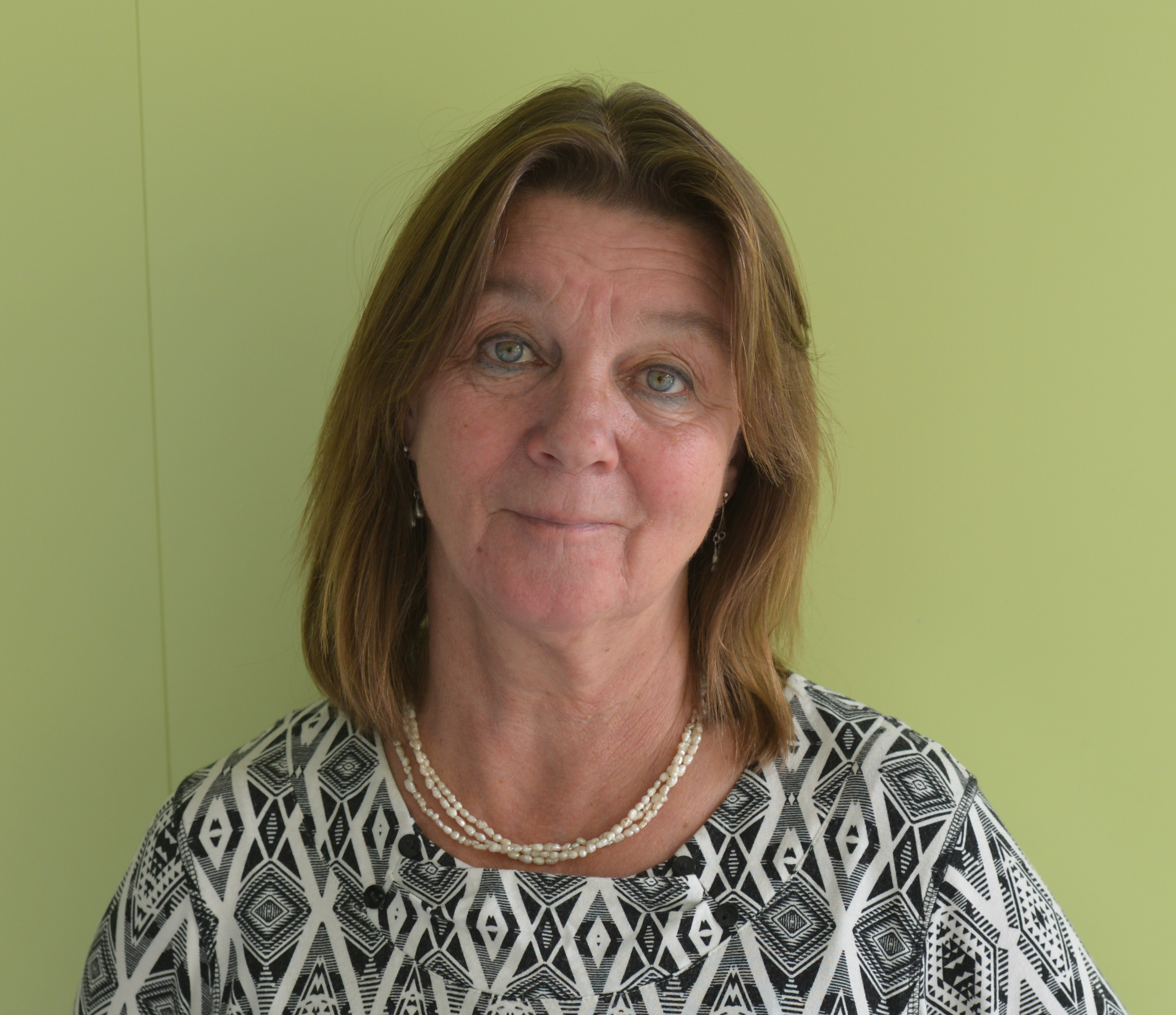
Elisabeth Rynell in 2017

Elisabeth Rynell (born 17 May 1954) is a Swedish poet and novelist. Her novel Till Mervas (2002), the first to be translated into English, appeared in 2011 as Mervas.

== Biography ==
Born in Stockholm, Rynell was the daughter of an English teacher and a nurse. After completing her schooling, she spent a year in England as an au pair. She has also visited Iran and Afghanistan on an overland trip to Pakistan and India. After spending much of her life in the far north of Sweden, she now lives in Stockholm and Hälsingland.

After her husband died when he was only 22, Rynell embarked on her writing career, publishing seven collections of poetry and four novels, both highly esteemed in Sweden. Her first collection of poems Nattliga samtal (Nocturnal Conversations) appeared in 1990 but it was her novel Hohaj (1997) which brought her into the limelight and earned her two literary prizes. Her most recent work, Skrivandets sinne (Sense of Writing, 2013) is a collection of autobiographical essays evoking her writings about the city and the countryside as well as accounts of her closest friends, including the author Sara Lidman.

== Awards ==
Elisabeth Rydall has received several awards including the Swedish Radio Novel Prize in 1998 for Hohal, the Swedish Academy's Dobloug Prize in 2007 and the Sara Lidman Prize in 2014.

== Works ==
- Lyrsvit m.m. gnöl 1975 (poetry)
- Veta hut 1979 (novel)
- Onda dikter 1980 (poetry)
- Humanismens seger 1982 (essay)
- Sorgvingesång 1985 (poetry)
- Sjuk fågel 1988 (poetry)
- Nattliga samtal 1990 (poetry)
- En berättelse om Loka 1990 (novel)
- Öckenvandrare 1993 (poetry)
- Hohaj 1997 (novel)
- Till Mervas 2002 (novel)
- I mina hus 2006 (poetry)
- Hitta hem 2009 (novel)
- Skrivandets sinne 2013 (essays)
