= Ulf Miehe =

German screenwriter

- Born: 11 May 1940; Wusterhausen, Germany
- Died: 13 July 1989 (aged 49); Munich, West Germany
- Occupations: Screenwriter; film director
- Years active: 1971–1987

Ulf Miehe (11 May 1940 – 13 July 1989) was a German screenwriter and film director. His 1975 film John Glückstadt was entered into the 25th Berlin International Film Festival.

== Selected filmography ==
- Jaider, der einsame Jäger (1971, directed by Volker Vogeler)
- Output (1974, directed by Michael Fengler)
- John Glückstadt (1975)
- Der Unsichtbare (1987)
