= Die Wache =

German police procedural television series

- Genre: Police procedural
- Inspired by: The Bill
- Country of origin: Germany
- Original language: German
- No. of seasons: 12
- No. of episodes: 245

Production
- Running time: 45 minutes
- Production company: Endemol

Original release
- Network: RTL
- Release: 3 January 1994 – 8 June 2006

Die Wache is a German weekly police procedural show that was broadcast from 1994 until 2006 by RTL Television. Set in a fictional police station in Cologne, it was modelled on the British series The Bill and described typical police episodes and investigations.

The entire series consisted of 245 episodes of 45 minutes during 12 seasons, between 3 January 1994 and 8 June 2006.

== Selected cast and characters ==
Actor	Role	Appearing
Hans Heinz Moser	Hans Maybach	Seasons 1–2
Axel Pape	Theo Severing	Seasons 1–2
Bernd E. Jäger von Boxen	Ulf Schelling	All seasons
Siegfried W. Kernen	Werner Krause	Seasons 1–2
Mogens von Gadow	Karl Schumacher	Season 1
