= Volker Vogeler =

German film director

- Born: 27 June 1930; Bad Polzin, Pomerania, Germany (now Polczyn Zdrój, Poland)
- Died: 16 April 2005 (aged 74); Hamburg, Germany
- Occupations: Film director, screenwriter
- Years active: 1967–2005

Volker Vogeler (27 June 1930 – 16 April 2005) was a German film director and screenwriter. He directed 13 films between 1967 and 2000. His 1971 film Jaider, der einsame Jäger was entered into the 21st Berlin International Film Festival.

== Selected filmography ==
=== Director ===
Film

- Jaider, der einsame Jäger (1971) — screenplay with Ulf Miehe
- Yankee Dudler (1973) — screenplay with Ulf Miehe and Bernardo Fernández
- Valley of the Dancing Widows (1975)
- Moving Targets (1984)

Television

- Das Bild (1967) — screenplay with Günter Herburger
- Mijnheer hat lauter Töchter (1968) — based on a novel by Marta Becker
- Die Söhne (1968) — screenplay with Günter Herburger
- Tanker (1970) — screenplay by Günter Herburger
- Varna (1970)
- Die Straße (1978) — screenplay by Herbert Brödl
- Zwei Tore hat der Hof (1979) — screenplay with Elke Loewe
- Luftwaffenhelfer (1980) — screenplay by Claus Hubalek
- Jonny Granat (1982) — screenplay by Elke Loewe
- Tatort: Wat Recht is, mutt Recht bliewen (1982) — screenplay by Boy Lornsen and Elke Loewe
- Al Kruger (1984)
- Ein Kriegsende (1984) — based on a story by Siegfried Lenz
- Tante Tilly (1986, TV series)
- Kein Weg zurück (2000)

=== Writer ===
- Student of the Bedroom (dir. Michael Verhoeven, 1970) — based on a novel by Finn Søeborg
- Output (dir. Michael Fengler, 1974) — based on a novel by Ulf Miehe
- The Old Fox (1978–2005, TV series, 181 episodes)
