= Hans W. Geißendörfer =

German film director and producer (born 1941)

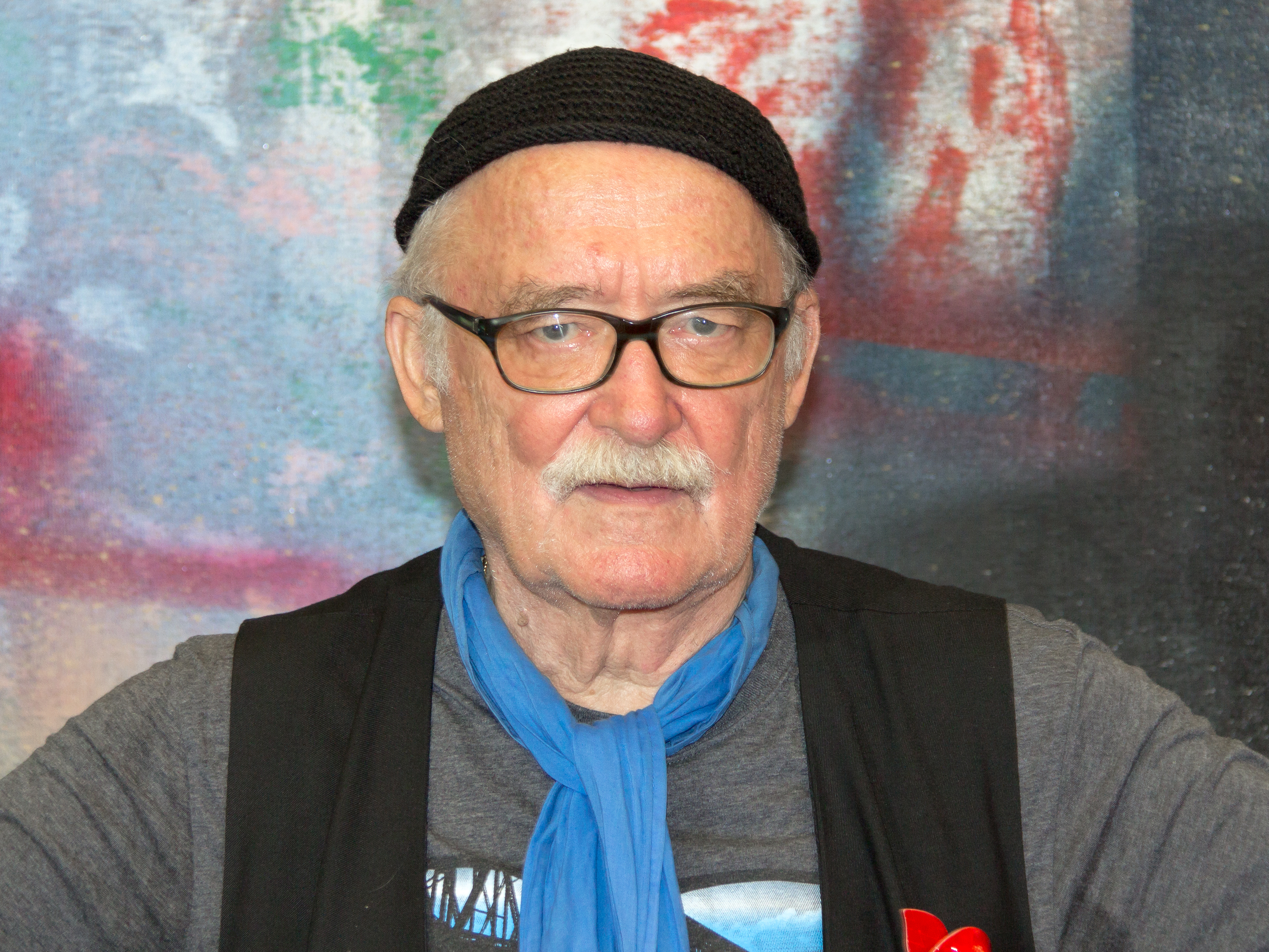
- Born: Wilhelm Max Geißendörfer; 6 April 1941 (age 85); Augsburg, Bavaria, Germany
- Occupation: Film director
- Website: geissendoerfer-film.de

Hans W. Geißendörfer (born 6 April 1941) is a German film director and producer.

Director of The Glass Cell (1978, starring Brigitte Fossey), which was nominated for the Academy Award for Best Foreign Language Film, and 16 other films (The Wild Duck starring Jean Seberg; The Magic Mountain starring Rod Steiger; Justice), he is creator of TV-Series Lindenstraße (since 1985).

In 1970, Geißendörfer won the Film Award in Gold at the Deutscher Filmpreis for Best New Direction for his first film Jonathan. In 1971 he directed the TV film Carlos, which starred Gottfried John and Anna Karina. His 1976 film The Sternstein Manor was entered into the 10th Moscow International Film Festival. In 1992 his film Gudrun was entered into the 42nd Berlin International Film Festival where it won an Honourable Mention. His drama Snowland (2005, starring Julia Jentsch and Thomas Kretschmann) won the Special Grand Prize at the Montréal World Film Festival.

The German director Hana Geißendörfer is his daughter.

== Selected filmography ==
- Jonathan (1970)
- Der Fall Lena Christ (1970, TV film) — (biographical film about Lena Christ)
- Eine Rose für Jane (1970, TV film)
- Carlos (1971, TV film) — (loosely based on Don Carlos)
- Marie (1972, TV film)
- Die Eltern (1974, TV film)
- Perahim – die zweite Chance (1974, TV film) — (based on a novel by C. Virgil Gheorghiu)
- Lobster (1976, TV series)
- The Sternstein Manor (Sternsteinhof, 1976) — (based on a novel by Ludwig Anzengruber)
- The Wild Duck (Die Wildente, 1976) — (based on The Wild Duck)
- The Glass Cell (Die gläserne Zelle, 1978) — (based on The Glass Cell)
- Theodor Chindler (1979, TV miniseries) — (based on a novel by Bernard von Brentano)
- The Magic Mountain (Der Zauberberg, 1982) — (based on The Magic Mountain)
- Edith's Diary (1983) — (based on Edith's Diary)
- Lindenstraße (1985–2020, TV series, producer)
- Boomerang Boomerang (1989)
- Gudrun (1992)
- Justice (1993) — (based on The Execution of Justice)
- Entführung aus der Lindenstraße (dir. George Moorse, 1995, TV film, producer)
- Schneeland (2005) — (based on a novel by Elisabeth Rynell)
- In the World You Have Fear (2011)
