= Lindenstraße =

German television series

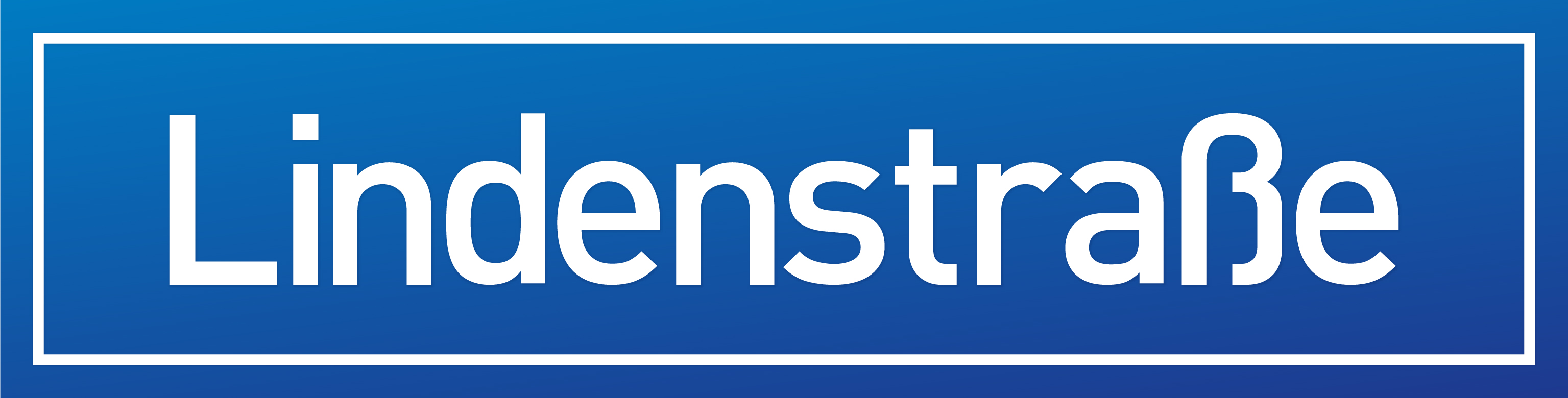
- The logo appearing on the series' title screen
- Created by: Hans W. Geißendörfer
- Starring: See below
- Countries of origin: West Germany (1985-1990); Germany (1990-2020)
- Original language: German
- No. of episodes: 1,758

Production
- Camera setup: Multiple-camera setup
- Running time: 30 minutes

Original release
- Network: Das Erste
- Release: 8 December 1985 – 29 March 2020

Lindenstraße (literally "Linden Street") is a long-running German television drama series, broadcast by Das Erste. The first episode aired on 8 December 1985 and since then new episodes were broadcast weekly until 2020. Its last timeslot on Das Erste was Sundays at 18:50. The events of the Sunday episode usually take place on the Thursday before the show. This is a result of the original plan having been to show each episode on a Thursday night. Before the start of the series the programme's timeslot was switched to Sunday evening, but Thursday remained the day on which the events are normally shown as taking place, because the original concept of dramatizing the events of daily life as experienced by a group of characters on an ordinary weekday has continued unchanged. Exceptions are the so-called holiday episodes where the events take place on such special occasions as Christmas and Easter; also on important election days (especially general elections to the German Bundestag).

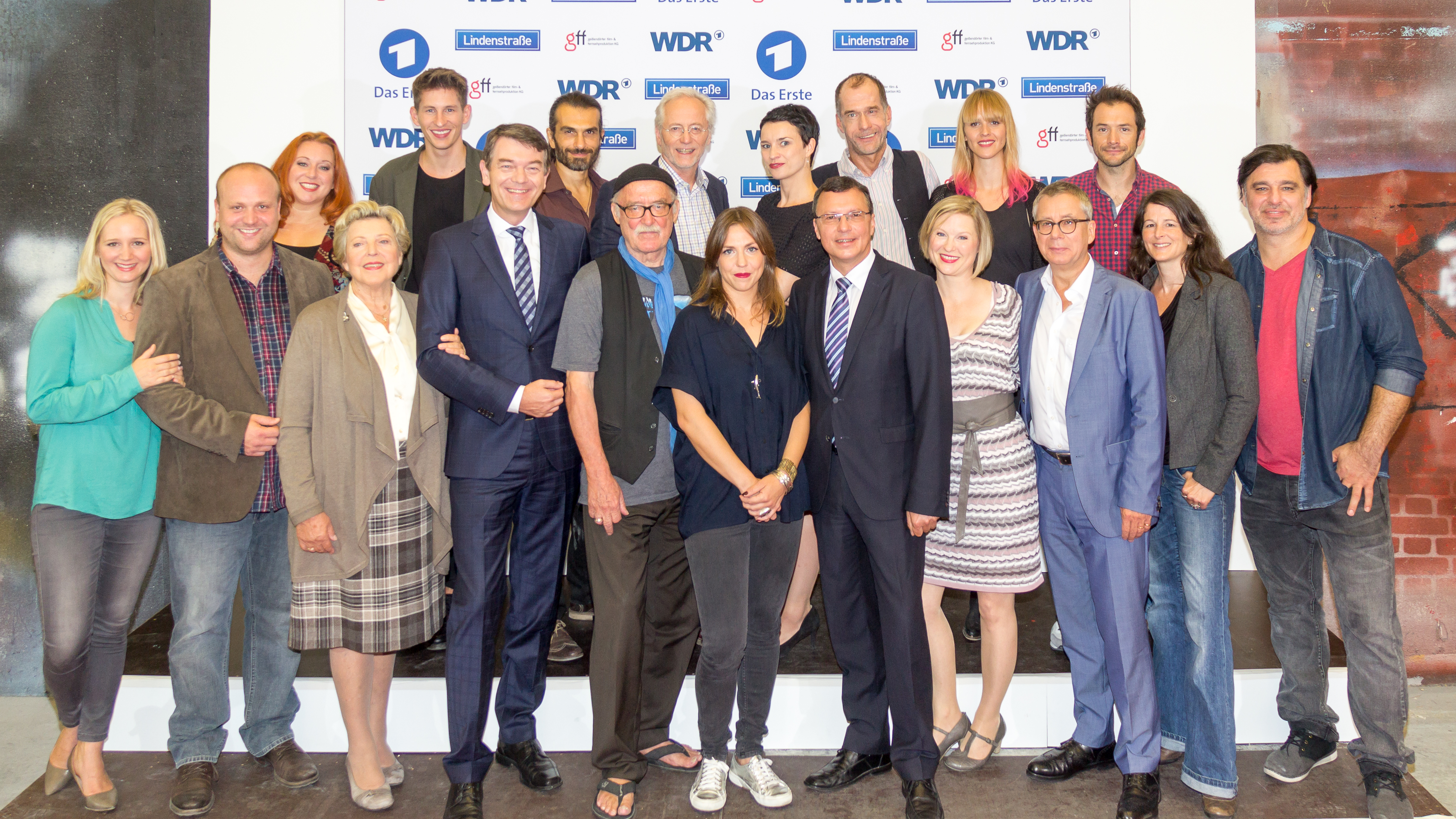
Press event 30 years Lindenstrasse - group picture

Setting the pace for other soap operas in Germany, the first episodes were mostly met with poor reviews. However, Lindenstraße soon became one of the most successful shows on German television.

On 16 November 2018 it was announced that the ARD television programme conference had decided – on cost grounds, despite the programme's continuing to attract between two and three million viewers weekly – not to extend its contract with the show's producers, Geißendörfer Film- und Fernsehproduktion, and that the series would therefore come to an end, after nearly 35 years, in March 2020.

== Development ==
Logo used until September 2015

The creator of Lindenstraße is Hans W. Geißendörfer, whose company Geißendörfer Film- und Fernsehproduktion GmbH (GFF - "Geißendörfer film and TV productions") produced the series until its end. In the beginning, Geißendörfer also directed the series. It is set in Munich, but filmed at the WDR studios in Cologne-Bocklemünd, where an entire outdoor street mock-up of the eponymous Lindenstraße was built. An actual street named 'Lindenstraße' exists in Munich's Harlaching district, but it has nothing to do with the series' fictional street.

The show is based on the long-running British soap Coronation Street, from which it borrows its main premise (the everyday life of a number of neighbours). It tackles topics such as racism, cancer, AIDS, Alzheimer's disease, disabilities (both physical and mental), and homosexuality. In 1987, it gained attention for showing the first gay kiss on German television. The show is also known for its prompt incorporation of real-life events and current topics.

United States television actor Larry Hagman made a cameo appearance on Lindenstraße on 19 February 2006.

Geißendörfer wrote and directed the first 31 episodes himself. After that, the series was directed by a rotating group of directors that took turns in about 10-episode blocks. Among them were Herwig Fischer, Kerstin Krause, Dominikus Probst and Iain Dilthey.

There have been many different writers of the show throughout the years. Among them were Michael Meisheit, who has been writing for Lindenstraße from 1997 to 2018, and Irene Fischer, who has been writing for Lindenstraße from 1999 to 2016. She has also been playing a main character in the series since 1987. In 2013, Geißendörfer's daughter Hana Geißendörfer joined the team and the first episodes written by her aired in late April.

== Setting ==
The series is set in the Lindenstraße, a fictional street in Munich. The resident families Beimer-Schiller, Beimer-Ziegler and Zenker, as well as couples without children and communes are very prominent characters in the show. There is also a doctor's office, currently run by Dr. Iris Brooks. In the past, it has been run by Dr. Ernesto Stadler, Dr. Carsten Flöter and his stepfather Dr. Ludwig Dressler. There is also a Greek restaurant "Akropolis" and a supermarket.

There are also a few shops in the Kastanienstraße (literally "Chestnut Street"), which is at one end of the Lindenstraße. There is an organic food shop called "1 A Bio" (It used to be the chocolate store "Kakao" and the gourmet food shop called "Alimentari". There is also a café called "Café Bayer" and a travel agency called "Träwel und Iwends" (a pun on the German pronunciation of Travel and Events) as well as the car shop "Die Werkstatt". There are also several minor characters who live on this street.

On the other end of the Lindenstraße, one can find the Ulrike-Böss-Straße. In it is a movie theater ("Astor"), the "Café George" and a hair salon.

== Cast ==
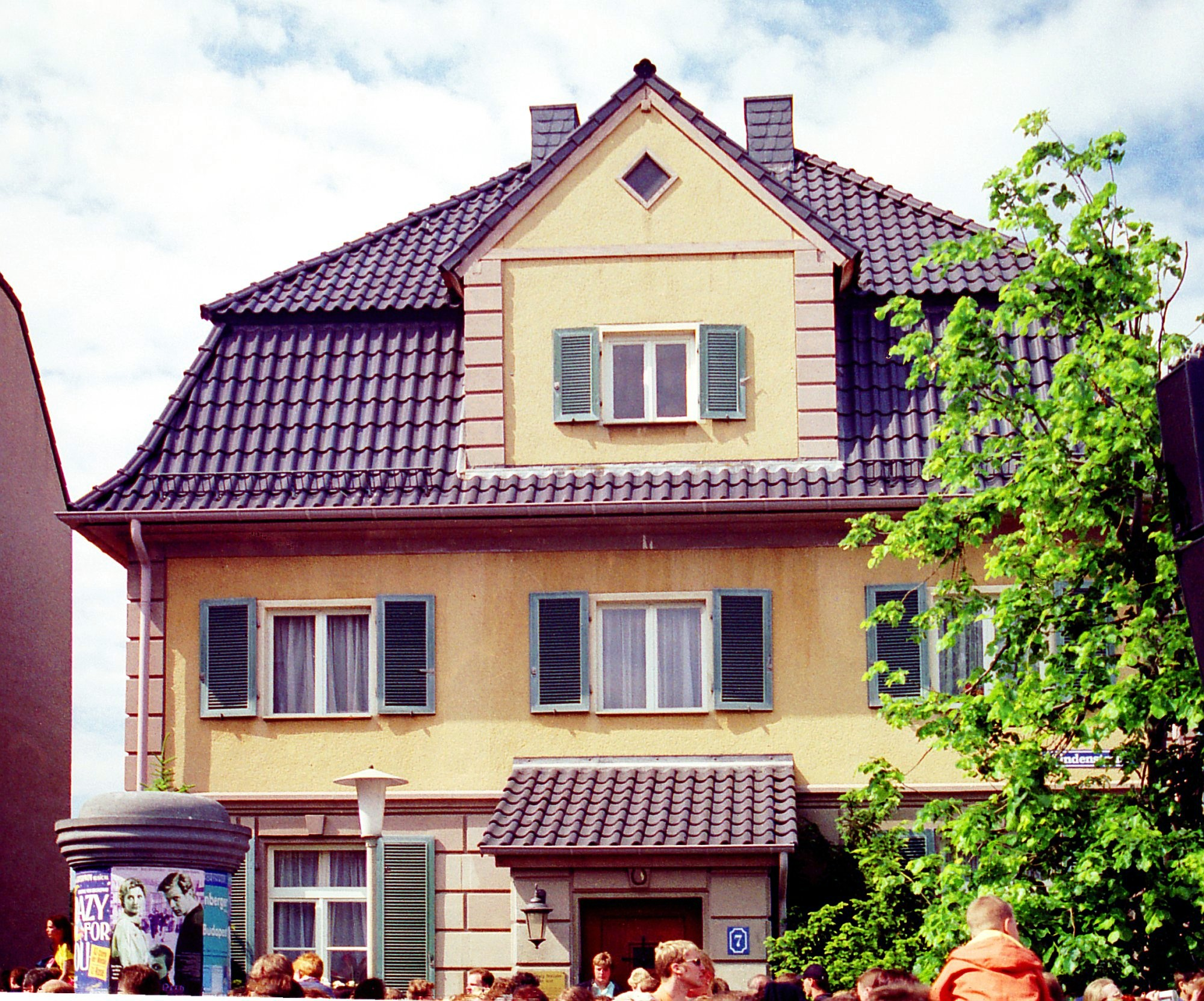
Lindenstraße Nr. 7, the Dressler residence

Due to the frequency of social problem topics treated in the series, a high proportion of the characters come from minority groups of diverse kind or live in patchwork relationships. From the Greek restaurant with its family and a Vietnamese which were there from the beginning, characters and whole families with migration background have come and gone from Italy, Turkey, Eastern Europe etc. The final cast counted three male homosexuals, two of them living in marriage with an adopted son, and one female homosexual with a test-tube baby. There was a homeless man (until the death of Harry Rowohlt), a man in a wheelchair, a child with Down syndrome, a trans woman and so on.

Fans of the series have proclaimed in mild jest that a "normal" family wouldn't survive the Lindenstraße. As if to prove this, the model Bavarian family Stadler which moved to the street in September 2008 has only one member, the contrarian grandfather, remaining in the street as of early 2013. He "occupies" a room in a commune otherwise populated by twens. His son, the family father, fled the street after the family mother had a love-affair with his brother. The mother then broke up with the brother and started a new affair with a young immigrant from the Balkans who hid his visa-less family in an apartment in the same house. The younger family daughter, who became a teenage mother after a Lindenstraße resident of her age purposely broke a condom, fell in love with the same immigrant and left the street in shock after finding out that he preferred her mother over herself. The mother and the immigrant then left the street together. The older teenage daughter had more luck and married a widely liked Lindenstraße resident in Las Vegas with whom she started a successful business in the street, only to suddenly die from a food poisoning originating in the Greek restaurant in February 2013.

=== Final regular cast members ===
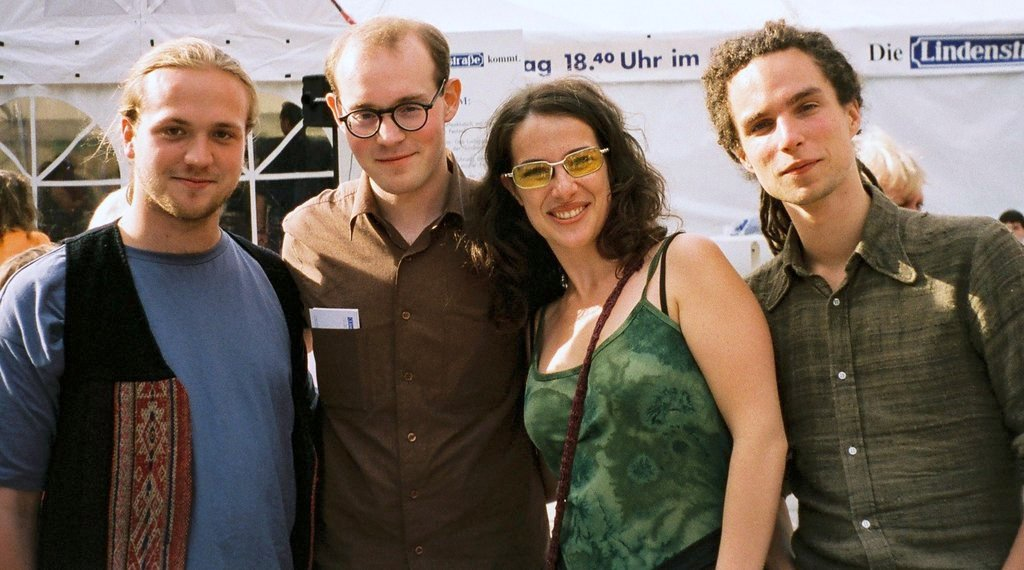
Moritz A. Sachs, Philipp Neubauer, Clelia Sarto, Moritz Zielke in 1998.

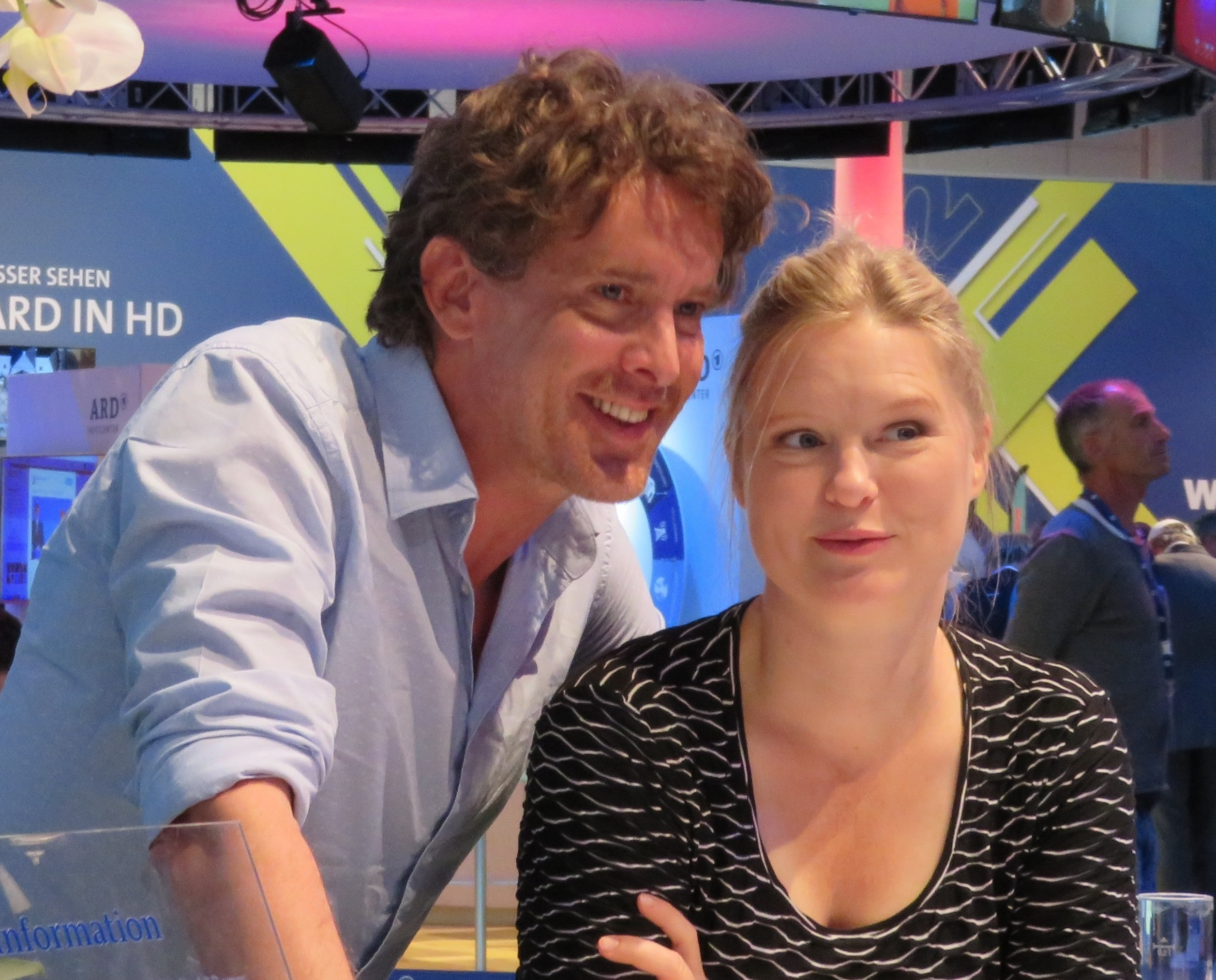
Gunnar Solka and Sybille Waury in 2017.

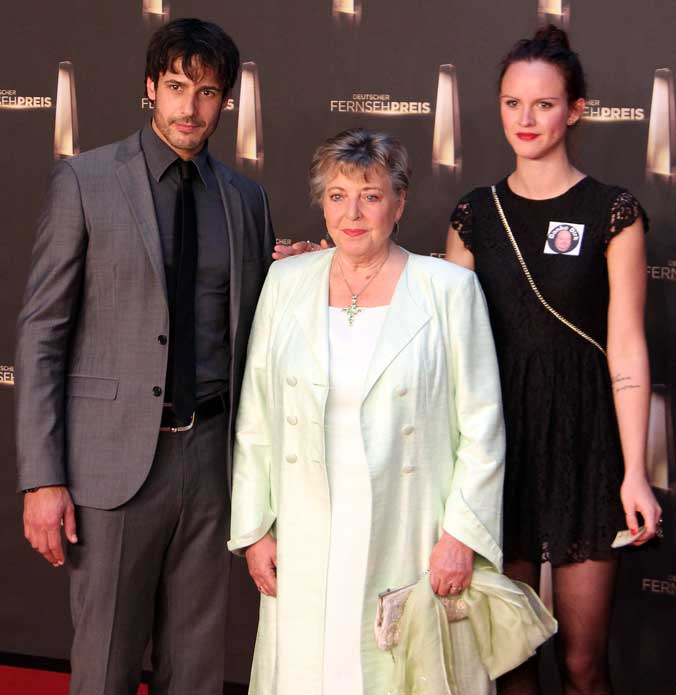
Valentin Schreyer, Marie-Luise Marjan, Cosima Viola in 2012.

| Actor | Character | Duration |
|---|---|---|
| Daniela Bette | Angelina Dressler, adopted, née Buchstab | 2007–2020 |
| Jo Bolling | Andreas "Andy" Zenker | 1990–2020 |
| Sophia Brinkmann | Deniz Dağdelen | 2011–2020 |
| Anna-Sophia Claus | Lea Starck #2 | 1999–2020 |
| Ole Dahl | Paul Dağdelen, accepted, née Hoffmeister #3 | 2009–2020 |
| Irene Fischer | Anna Ziegler, née Jenner | 1987–2013, 2015–2020 |
| Greta Goodworth | Lara Brooks | 2012-2018 |
| Joris Gratwohl | Alexander "Alex" Behrend | 2000–2020 |
| Jan Grünig | Martin "Mürfel" Ziegler | 1999–2013, 2015–2020 |
| Erkan Gündüz | Murat Dağdelen | 1999–2020 |
| Hermes Hodolides | Vasily Sarikakis | 1985–2020 |
| Trixi Janson | Mila Pashenko #2 | 2013–2020 |
| Jojo | Simon Schildknecht #3 | 2014–2020 |
| Beatrice Kaps-Zurmahr | Andrea Neumann | 2004–2009, 2010–2020 |
| Marie-Luise Marjan | Helga Beimer, née Wittich | 1985–2020 |
| Sarah Masuch | Dr. Iris Brooks | 2012–2020 |
| Philipp Neubauer | Dr. Philipp Sperling | 1992–2003, 2012–2020 |
| Sontje Peplow | Lisa Dağdelen, née Hoffmeister | 1991–2020 |
| Moritz A. Sachs | Klaus Beimer | 1985–2020 |
| Jannik Scharmweber | Nicolai "Nico" Zenker #6 | 2015–2020 |
| Rebecca Siemoneit-Barum | Iphigenie "Iffi" Zenker | 1990–2012, 2014–2020 |
| Gunnar Solka | Peter "Lotti" Lottmann | 2004–2020 |
| Andrea Spatzek | Gabriele "Gabi" Zenker, née Skabowski | 1985–2020 |
| Amorn Surangkanjanajai | Gung Pham Kien | 1985–2020 |
| Jacqueline Svilarov | Nina Zöllig | 1999–2007, 2011–2020 |
| Sara Turchetto | Marcella Varese #2 | 1998–2020 |
| Georg Uecker | Dr. Carsten Flöter | 1986–1991, 1995–2020 |
| Cosima Viola | Jacqueline "Jack" Aichinger | 2001–2020 |
| Martin Walde | Marek/Sunny Zöllig | 2016–2020 |
| Sybille Waury | Tanja Schildknecht | 1985–2020 |
| Katharina Witza | Antonia "Toni" Zenker | 2005–2020 |

== See also ==
- List of soap operas
- Entführung aus der Lindenstraße, a 1995 TV Special featuring many Lindenstraße cast members.

== Books ==
- Judy Bister und Sandra Müller; Joachim Christian Huth (Hrsg.): Das Lindenstraßen-Universum. Alle Geschichten. 1. Auflage. vgs, Köln 1998, ISBN 3-8025-2613-9.
- Judy Bister und Sandra Müller; Joachim Christian Huth (Hrsg.): Das Lindenstraßen-Universum. Daten, Fakten, Hintergründe. 1. Auflage. vgs, Köln 1998, ISBN 3-8025-2614-7.
- Hans W. Geißendörfer und Wolfram Lotze (Hrsg.): Lindenstraße — 1000 Folgen in Wort und Bild. Schwarzkopf & Schwarzkopf Verlag, Berlin 2004, ISBN 3-89602-609-7.
- Hans W. Geißendörfer und Wolfram Lotze (Hrsg.): Lindenstraße — Die Folgen 1001 bis 1500 in Text und Bild Schwarzkopf & Schwarzkopf Verlag, Berlin 2014, ISBN 978-3862653867.
