= Rosel Zech =

German actress

- Born: Rosalie Helga Lina Zech; 7 July 1940; Berlin, Germany
- Died: 31 August 2011 (aged 71); Berlin, Germany
- Occupations: Theater and film actress

Rosalie Helga Lina Zech (7 July 1940 – 31 August 2011), known as Rosel Zech, was a German theater and film actress, she is most well known for her works associated with the "Autorenkino" (New German Cinema) movement, which began in the 1970s.

== Career ==
=== Theater ===
Rosel Zech was born in Berlin; her father was a citizen of Poland. Because of her birth out of wedlock, her mother, a dressmaker, married an inland waterway boatman soon after her daughter's birth, giving her his last name, She was raised in Hoya, Germany. Her performances led her, at the age of 20, to Lower Bavaria, where in 1962, her first theatrical engagement was in the South Bavarian City Theater (now the Lower Bavarian State Theatre) in Landshut.

This was followed by other roles at various other theaters, such as in 1964 at the Städtebundtheater in Biel and at the summer theater in Winterthur. Two years later, she played at the Schauspielhaus Wuppertal. From 1970 to 1972, she appeared on stage at the Staatstheater Stuttgart and then at the Schauspielhaus Bochum.

During the 1978-79 season, Rosel Zech was active in Hamburg at the Deutsches Schauspielhaus and then returned to her native city of Berlin, where she acted on the Volksbühne. In 1981 she was hired by the Bayerischen Staatsschauspiel in Munich. Four years later, she was seen again at the Schauspielhaus in Hamburg. In 2009 she worked with in the Luisenburg Festival in the play Mother Courage as Anna Fierlinger.

=== Film and television ===
She made her 1970 television debut in The Pot. In 1973 she appeared in a small role in The Tenderness of Wolves with Kurt Raab and Margit Carstensen. On the set, she met Rainer Werner Fassbinder, who produced the film. She and Fassbinder began an extended collaboration. The same year, Peter Zadek cast the actress in his film version of Kleiner Mann – was nun? ("Little man - what now?" with Heinrich Giskes and Hannelore Hoger.

Other films and TV movies followed, including a film version of Anton Chekhov's The Seagull, and Henrik Ibsen's Hedda Gabler. In the children's film Die Vorstadtkrokodile from 1977, she played Mrs. Wolferman, the mother of one of the "crocodiles". She appeared in Peter Fleischmann's 1979 science fiction film The Hamburg Syndrome.

In 1981, she was cast by Rainer Werner Fassbinder in the film Lola (1981) in a supporting role as the wife of Mario Adorf. Fassbinder immediately chose her for his next project, Veronika Voss, and cast her as the lead. This second Fassbinder film was inspired by the life of the UFA actress Sybille Schmitz. Rosel Zech's convincing portrayal of the morphine-addicted actress turned Zech into a star overnight. The film was awarded in the 1982 Berlin International Film Festival with a Golden Bear. In the following years, Zech focused mainly on work in television and appeared in numerous television series and television films, as well as in regular theater productions in Berlin, where she lived during her last years. From 2002 until her death, she had a regular role as the mother superior in the German TV series Um Himmels Willen.

== Death ==
She died of bone cancer in Berlin on 31 August 2011, aged 71.

== Awards ==
- 1968: Förderpreis des Landes Nordrhein-Westfalen
- 1976: Schauspielerin des Jahres der Zeitschrift Theater heute for Hedda Gabler
- 1982: Goldener Bär der Berlinale for Die Sehnsucht der Veronika Voss
- 1983: Deutscher Darstellerpreis for Mascha
- 1990: Kainz-Medaille der Stadt Wien for Eines langen Tages Reise in die Nacht
- 1991: 1. Preis des World Film Festival in Montreal for Salmonberries
- 1992: Bayerischer Filmpreis (Beste Darstellerin) for Salmonberries
- 1999: Bayerischer Verdienstorden
- 2001: Merkur-Theaterpreis der Zeitung Münchner Merkur for Afterplay

== Filmography ==
- 1970: Der Pott (TV movie, directed by Peter Zadek), as Susi
- 1973: The Tenderness of Wolves (directed by Ulli Lommel), as Dame an der Tür
- 1973: Little Man, What Now? (TV movie, directed by Peter Zadek), as Marlene Dietrich / Marie Kleinholtz / Bettlerkind / Frau Nothnagel / Claire Waldoff
- 1974: Mädchen in Uniform (TV movie), as Frau von Bernburg
- 1974: The Seagull (TV movie, directed by Peter Zadek), as Nina Michailowna Saretschnaja
- 1974: Ice Age (directed by Peter Zadek), as Wanda
- 1977: Die Geisel (TV movie, directed by Peter Zadek), as Mrs. Gilchrist
- 1977: Die Vorstadtkrokodile (TV movie, directed by Wolfgang Becker), as Frau Wolfermann
- 1978: Hedda Gabler (TV movie, directed by Peter Zadek), as Hedda Gabler
- 1978: Verführungen (TV movie, directed by Michael Verhoeven), as Christine
- 1979: The Hamburg Syndrome (directed by Peter Fleischmann), as Dr. Hamm
- 1980: Mosch (directed by Tankred Dorst), as Adele
- 1980: The Misanthrope (TV movie, directed by Peter Zadek), as Célimène
- 1981: Years Passed (TV movie, directed by Peter Keglevic), as Herlinde
- 1981: Der Nächste bitte (TV Movie)
- 1981: Lola (directed by Rainer Werner Fassbinder), as Frau Schuckert
- 1981: Heute spielen wir den Boss / Wo geht's denn hier zum Film? (directed by Peer Raben), as Frau Kaiser
- 1981: Die Knapp-Familie (TV miniseries) as Elfriede Knapp
- 1982: Veronika Voss (directed by Rainer Werner Fassbinder), as Veronika Voss
- 1983: Mascha (TV movie)
- 1983: The Oppermanns (TV movie, directed by Egon Monk), as Lieselotte Oppermann
- 1983: Klawitter (TV movie, directed by Günter Gräwert), as Elli Hoff
- 1984: Julia (TV movie, directed by Wolfgang Glück), as Julia Lambert
- 1985: Tatort (Episode: "Der Mord danach"), as Jutta Reismüller
- 1985: Der Angriff der Gegenwart auf die übrige Zeit (directed by Alexander Kluge), as Ärztin
- 1986: Runaway Horse (TV movie, directed by Peter Beauvais), as Sabine Halm
- 1986: The Old Fox (Episode: "Blutgoldspur") as Helma Köhler
- 1986: Betrogene Liebe (TV movie) as Agnes
- 1986: Vermischte Nachrichten (directed by Alexander Kluge), as Erfolgstyp
- 1987: Nebel im Fjord (TV movie), as Claudia Busch
- 1987: Herz mit Löffel
- 1987: Die Bombe (TV movie), as Helga Meyerdiercks
- 1987: The Old Fox (Episode: "Verwischte Spuren"), as Gabriele Lohmann
- 1987: The Old Fox (Episode: "Mord ist Mord"), as Ingrid Pohl
- 1988: Die Bertinis (TV miniseries, directed by Egon Monk), as Erika Schwarz
- 1988: Hemingway (TV miniseries, directed by Bernhard Sinkel), as Lilli Marleen
- 1989: Fabrik der Offiziere (TV miniseries), as Felicitas Frey
- 1989: The Old Fox (Episode: "Ausgestiegen") as Jutta Sander
- 1990: Non-Stop Trouble in the Hospital as Frau Berger
- 1991: Salmonberries (directed by Percy Adlon), as Roswitha
- 1993: Mr. Bluesman (directed by Sönke Wortmann), as Mrs. Neuhaus
- 1993: Derrick (Episode: "Nach acht langen Jahren") as Charlotte Heine
- 1993: Der rote Vogel (TV Mini-Series) as Ellen Vondrowski
- 1994: Polizeiruf 110 (Episode: "Gespenster") as Mutter Reiser
- 1994: Das Baby der schwangeren Toten (TV Movie) as Betti Ley
- 1995: Hades
- 1995: Schade um Papa (TV Series) as Lena Bandmann
- 1995: Dicke Freunde (TV Movie) as Marianne Strauß
- 1995: Outside Time (TV Movie) as Sophie's Mother
- 1996: Ärzte: Die indische Ärztin (TV Series) as Dr. Karla Fasching-Spiehweg
- 1996: Die Geliebte (TV Series)
- 1997: Lea Katz – Die Kriminalpsychologin (Episode: "Das wilde Kind") as Gisela Straub
- 1997: Terror im Namen der Liebe (TV Movie) as Elke
- 1997: Die letzte Rettung (TV Movie) as Gudrun
- 1998: Der Schlüssel (Short) as Reinigungschefin
- 1998: Tatort (Episode: "Der zweite Mann") as Juwelierin
- 1998: Tatort (Episode: "Todesbote") as Silvia Blankenberg
- 1999: Aimée & Jaguar as Blonde Frau
- 1999: Siska (Episode: "Blackout") as Dr. Beate Paulus
- 1999: The Old Fox (Episode: "Im Angesicht des Todes") as Judith Bennesch
- 1999: Morgen gehört der Himmel dir (TV Movie, directed by Ute Wieland) as Frau Niering
- 1999: Ein Fall für zwei (Episode: "Abgebrüht") as Klara Schierer
- 2000: Oh, du Fröhliche (TV Movie), as Irmela Kapp
- 2001: Ein unmöglicher Mann (TV Mini-Series) as Frau Schmitt-Oedenthal
- 2001: Große Liebe wider Willen (TV Movie) as Claudia
- 2001: Das Schneeparadies (TV Movie) as Margot
- 2002: Im Visier der Zielfahnder (Episode: "Die Frau ohne Namen") as Britta Prahm
- 2002: I'm the Father (directed by Dani Levy), as Melanies Mutter
- 2002: Zwei Affären und eine Hochzeit (TV Movie) as Rosa Richter
- 2002–2011: Um Himmels Willen (TV Series, 130 episodes) as Oberin Elisabeth Reuter (final appearance)
- 2003: Anatomie 2 as Dr. Bamberg
- 2003: Tatort (Episode: "Veras Waffen") as Marion von Pahl
- 2003: Der Auftrag - Mordfall in der Heimat (TV Movie) as Karin Eisner
- 2003: Plötzlich wieder 16 (TV Movie) as Professorin
- 2003: Stubbe – Von Fall zu Fall (Episode: "Yesterday") as Dorothee Mewes
- 2004: Tatort (Episode: "Mörderspiele") as Monika Hanke-Helmhövel
- 2004: Kammerflimmern as Oma Crash
- 2004: The Old Fox (Episode: "Tod im Morgengrauen") as Gisela von Lindow
- 2005: Rosamunde Pilcher (Episode: "Segel der Liebe") as Winona Carter
- 2005: K3 – Kripo Hamburg (Episode: "Fieber") as Pauline Petersen
- 2005: In Liebe eine Eins (TV Movie) as Ursula Sandrock
- 2006: Papa und Mama (TV Series) as Mutter Martha
- 2006: Mr. Nanny – Ein Mann für Mama (TV Movie) as Marlene Meister
- 2006: Agathe kann's nicht lassen (Episode: "Die Tote im Bootshaus"") as Katharina Meindl
- 2008: Das Traumschiff (Episode: "Kilimandscharo - Malediven - Indien") as Kathrin Kriegel
- 2008: Einsatz in Hamburg (Episode: "Ein sauberer Mord") as Doris Blank
- 2008–2009: Der Schwarzwaldhof (TV Series) as Dora Hofer
- 2009: Savvy Lena (TV miniseries, directed by Ute Wieland) as Alma Sattler
- 2011: Schicksalsjahre (TV Series) as Martha Engler
