= List of LGBTQ-related films of 1969 =

This is a list of lesbian, gay, bisexual, transgender or queer-related films released in 1969. It contains theatrically released films that deal with important gay, lesbian, bisexual, transgender or queer characters or issues and may have same-sex romance or relationships as a plot device.

== Films ==
Title	Director	Country	Genre	Cast	Notes
Alice in Acidland	Donn Greer as John Donne	United States	Exploitation	Julia Blackburn, Roger Gentry and Donn Greer	
The Damned	Luchino Visconti	Italy; West Germany	Drama	Dirk Bogarde, Ingrid Thulin, Helmut Griem, Helmut Berger, Renaud Verley, Umberto Orsini, Reinhard Kolldehoff, Albrecht Schoenhals, Florinda Bolkan, Nora Ricci, Charlotte Rampling and Karl-Otto Alberty	
Deliver Us from Evil (Délivrez-nous du mal)	Jean-Claude Lord	Canada	Drama	Yvon Deschamps, Guy Godin, Catherine Bégin, Olivette Thibault	
Facifica Falayfay	Luciano B. Carlos	Philippines	Comedy, Drama	Dolphy, Panchito, Pilar Pilapil, Rod Navarro, Martin Marfil and Dely Atay-Atayan	
Fellini Satyricon	Federico Fellini	Italy	Drama, fantasy	Martin Potter, Hiram Keller, Max Born, Salvo Randone, Mario Romagnoli, Magali Noël, Capucine, Alain Cuny, Fanfulla, Donyale Luna, Danika La Loggia, Gordon Mitchell, Lucia Bosè, Joseph Wheeler, Luigi Montefiori, Elisa Mainardi, Tanya Lopert and Alvaro Vitali	Loosely based on Satyricon by Petronius
Fräulein Doktor	Luchino Visconti	Italy; Yugoslavia	Drama	Suzy Kendall, Kenneth More, Capucine, James Booth, Alexander Knox, Nigel Green and Giancarlo Giannini	Loosely based on the life of Elsbeth Schragmüller
Funeral Parade of Roses	Toshio Matsumoto	Japan	Drama	Peter, Yoshio Tsuchiya, Emiko Azuma, Toyosaburo Uchiyama, Don Madrid, Koichi Nakamura, Chieko Kobayashi, Shōtarō Akiyama and Kiyoshi Awazu	aka Bara no sôretsu. Loosely adapted from Oedipus Rex by Sophocles
The Gay Deceivers	Bruce Kessler	United States	Comedy	Kevin Coughlin, Brooke Bundy, Lawrence P. Casey, Jo Ann Harris, Michael Greer, Sebastian Brook, Jack Starrett, Richard Webb, Eloise Hardt, Jeanne Baird, Michael Kopcha and Joe Tornatore	
Hunting Scenes from Bavaria	Peter Fleischmann	West Germany	Drama	Martin Sperr, Angela Winkler, Else Quecke, Michael Strixner, Maria Stadler, Gunja Seiser, Johann Brunner, Hanna Schygulla and Renate Sandner	a.k.a. Jagdszenen aus Niederbayern; based on the play of the same name by Martin Sperr
Justine	George Cukor	United States	Drama	Anouk Aimée, Dirk Bogarde, Michael York, Robert Forster, Anna Karina, Philippe Noiret, John Vernon, Jack Albertson, Cliff Gorman, George Baker, Elaine Church, Michael Constantine, Marcel Dalio, Michael Dunn, Barry Morse and Danielle Roter	Based on the novel of the same name by Lawrence Durrell
Midnight Cowboy	John Schlesinger	United States	Drama	Jon Voight, Dustin Hoffman, Sylvia Miles, John McGiver, Brenda Vaccaro, Barnard Hughes, Ruth White, Jennifer Salt, Gilman Rankin, Georgann Johnson, Anthony Holland and Bob Balaban	Based on the novel of the same name by James Leo Herlihy
Staircase	Stanley Donen	United States; United Kingdom; France	Comedy	Rex Harrison, Richard Burton, Gordon Heath, Cathleen Nesbitt, Avril Angers, Neil Wilson, Shelagh Fraser, Gwen Nelson, Pat Heywood, Beatrix Lehmann, Stephen Lewis, Michael Rogers, Dermot Kelly, Royston Starr and Jake Kavanagh	Screenplay by Charles Dyer, based on his stage play of the same name
Venus in Furs	Jesús Franco	United Kingdom; West Germany; Italy	Horror, thriller	James Darren, Barbara McNair, Maria Rohm, Klaus Kinski, Dennis Price, Margaret Lee, Adolfo Lastretti, Jesus Franco, Manfred Mann and Paul Muller	a.k.a. Paroxismus
Women in Love	Ken Russell	United Kingdom	Drama, romance	Alan Bates, Oliver Reed, Glenda Jackson, Jennie Linden, Eleanor Bron, Alan Webb, Vladek Sheybal, Catherine Willmer, Phoebe Nicholls, Sharon Gurney, Christopher Gable, Michael Gough, Norma Shebbeare, Niké Arrighi, James Laurenson, Michael Graham Cox, Richard Heffer and Michael Garratt	Based on the novel of the same name by D. H. Lawrence
