= Carline Seiser =

German actress, painter, sculptor (born 1960)

- Born: 9 July 1960 (age 66); Munich, West Germany (now Germany)
- Occupations: Actress, painter and sculptor
- Years active: 1977–1979; 1991 (actor)
- Spouse: Konstantin Wecker (m. 1980; div. 1988)

Carline Seiser (born 9 July 1960) is a German actress, painter and sculptor. She became known in the late 1970s for her role in the science fiction film The Hamburg Syndrome.

== Life and career ==
Seiser was born in Starnberg. Seiser's father died a few years after she was born, so she grew up with her younger brother Philipp Seiser and an older sister, along with her mother, two aunts and grandparents. Her mother worked for Bayerischer Rundfunk and her aunt taught drama at the Münchner Kammerspiele. This creative environment had a lasting influence on her childhood and later adolescence. Seiser was already enthusiastic about the arts as a child. Encounters with paintings by various artists finally brought her to painting herself.

However, Seiser is best known for her short career as an actress when she was young. In 1977 she played her first role in an ensemble alongside Gustl Bayrhammer, Helmut Fischer, Michael Degen and Volker Prechtel in the television series Tatort, in the feature-length episode Das Mädchen am Klavier ("The Girl at the Piano") by director Lutz Büscher. A year later she was directed by Diethard Klante in his crime drama Lauter anständige Menschen ("Loud Decent People") alongside Werner Asam, Hilde Lermann and Horst Michael Neutze.

In 1978, the director Peter Fleischmann cast Seiser for the female lead of Ulrike in The Hamburg Syndrome, a four million DM utopian end-of-times drama with surreal features, alongside Helmut Griem, Fernando Arrabal, Ulrich Wildgruber and Tilo Prückner. The disturbing film did not have any outstanding commercial success when it was shown in 1979, but in professional circles it quickly received positive reviews: it was described as one of the most intelligent and timeless dramas in German science fiction, because of its excellent cast and the atmospheric music by Jean-Michel Jarre, being positively compared with Rainer Erler's dystopian drama Operation Ganymed. The Hamburg Syndrome was broadcast again as part of the art theme evening Die Rückkehr der Viren ("The Return of the Viruses").

Through her brother Philipp, who met Konstantin Wecker as a musician in 1979 and went on tour with him in Germany, she came into contact with Wecker, an actor, singer and songwriter, who was born in Munich in 1947. After completing filming of The Hamburg Syndrome, she largely put her film career on hold and the couple married in 1980. Seiser and Wecker separated in 1988. In 1991, Seiser was seen on film again under the direction of Wolf Gaudlitz in the television film Die Väter des Nardino ("The Fathers of Nardino").

In addition to her later work as a painter and sculptor with exhibitions in Munich and Vienna, Seiser also worked in theater for stage design and costume, and designed posters for theater and film projects.

== Filmography ==
- Tatort (TV series, 1977, episode "Das Mädchen am Klavier" ["The Girl at the Piano"])
- Lauter anständige Menschen (1978)
- The Hamburg Syndrome (1979)
- Die Väter des Nardino (1991)
