= Jagdszenen aus Niederbayern =

Jagdszenen aus Niederbayern may refer to:

- Jagdszenen aus Niederbayern (play), a 1965 play
- Hunting Scenes from Bavaria (German: Jagdszenen aus Niederbayern), a 1969 film based on the play
