= Hartmann Schmige =

- Occupation(s): Screenwriter, and Film Director
- Spouse: Sanna Alajoki-Schmige
- Children: Maximilian Schmige
- Website: http://www.hartmann-schmige.de

Hartmann Schmige is a German screenplay, teleplay writer, and film director. He is one of the founding members of the Verband Deutscher Drehbuchautoren (German Writers Guild).

== Career ==
Hartmann Schmige studied journalism, sociology, and political science in Freiburg, Munich, and Berlin with a masters final thesis in the montage theories by Eisenstein, Kracauer and Bazin.

In the 1980s Hartmann Schmige became renowned for writing the Dieter Hallervorden feature films together with writer Christian Rateuke. Non-Stop Trouble with My Double marks one of Hartmann Schmige's biggest successes. Some of the dialogue lines from the movie have reached cult status.

Hartmann Schmige continues his career as a German Television writer for German crime series and comedies.

== Other works ==
Book: Eisenstein, Bazin, Kracauer |1977| About Film Montage Theory

Schmige also wrote the musical Schlemihl in 1987 together with Christian Rateuke. The music was composed by Wilhelm Dieter Siebert. Schmige and Siebert also wrote the opera libretto Der Untergang der Titanic (The Sinking of the Titanic) in 1980.

== Filmography (selection) ==
=== Writing ===
==== Feature films ====
- Non-Stop Trouble with Spies (1983)
- Non-Stop Trouble with My Double (1984)
- Non-Stop Trouble with the Family (1985)

==== Television (episodic) ====
- Wolffs Revier (1992–2000)
- A.S. (1995–1998)
- Ein Mord für Quandt (1996–1997)

Other episodes (since 2000) for popular German crime series such as Sperling, Ein Fall für zwei, Der Ermittler and Tatort.

==== Television Film ====
- Rotlicht (1992)
- Engel sucht Flügel (2001)

=== Directing ===
- The Man in Pyjamas (1981)
- Der Träumer (1982)
