= Doris Gercke =

German writer (1937–2025)

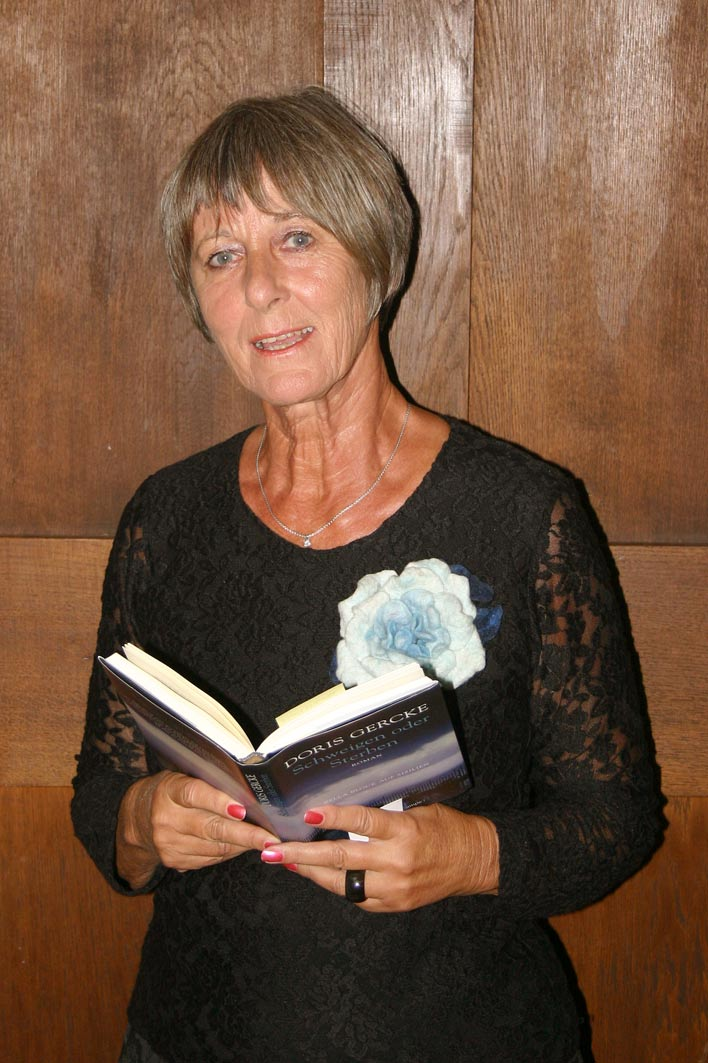
- Gercke at a reading, 2007
- Born: 7 February 1937; Greifswald, Germany
- Died: 25 July 2025 (aged 88); Hamburg, Germany
- Other name: Mary-Jo Morell
- Occupation: Novelist

Doris Gercke (German: [ˈdoːʁɪs ˈgɛʁkə]; 7 February 1937 – 25 July 2025) was a German writer of novels, especially thrillers but also books for children and youth, and poetry. For some books, she used the pen name Mary-Jo Morell. She is known for a series of thrillers featuring a female private detective, who inspired inspector Bella Block in a popular television series by ZDF.

== Life and career ==
Gercke was born in Greifswald on 7 February 1937 into a working-class family. They moved to Hamburg in 1949. Her parents could not afford higher education for her, when there was still a fee for secondary schools; she became a civil servant at the age of 16. Married at age 20, she had her second child at the age of 22, and gave up working to be a full-time homemaker and mother. She became a member of DKP in the 1968 Außerparlamentarische Opposition movement and regularly took part in demonstrations. She became women's representative of the party. In 1980 she completed the Abitur and studied law, funded by a scholarship. She never practised in the profession, but turned to writing her first novel in 1987.

The thriller, Weinschröter, du mußt hängen, appeared in 1988, featuring a woman as main character, Bella Block. Block is a former policewoman carrying out private investigations. She is described as the granddaughter of a Russian author, independent and often ill-tempered, as a lover of vodka and literature, who never goes out for observations without a good book. Block embodied the goals of the women's movement which seemed at an end at the time. The topics of the book are everyday violence and sexism, in desolate surroundings. Gercke said that she was inspired by novels by Raymond Chandler and the Swedish team of authors Maj Sjöwall and Per Wahlöö. Her book was a hit, and encouraged her to write more thrillers in a series, often including "dense, sometimes ironically broken descriptions of the milieu", such as Moskau, meine Liebe (1989), Kinderkorn (1991), Schweigen oder Sterben (2007) and Zwischen Nacht und Tag (2012).

In 1994, a first television film was aired by ZDF with an inspector based on the first Bella Block book, with Hannelore Hoger portraying Bella Block. It became very popular, running in 38 episodes until 2018. It developed its own concept.

Initially under the pseudonym Marie-Jo Morell, Gercke also wrote thrillers around a character named Milena Prohaska, described as "a supposedly emancipated anti-heroine on a quest for self-discovery". She wrote books for children and youth as well as poems.

Gercke identified with the political left and was connected with pacifism and the struggle against neo-fascism and communism. She said in an interview around her 80th birthday that she was with the lower class she had come from, and with the women.

Gercke died in Hamburg on 25 July 2025, at the age of 88.

== Awards ==
- 1991 Swedish Martin Beck Award for Du skrattade, du ska dö (Weinschröter, du musst hängen, 1988)
- 1991: Best Crime Novel in Swedish Translation for Du skrattade, du ska dö
- 2000 Glauser Ehrenpreis of the Vereinigung deutschsprachiger Krimiautoren, for lifetime achievement in the service of German thrillers

== Works ==
Gercke's books include:

- Königin der Insel. Hoffmann & Campe, Hamburg 2015, ISBN 978-3-455-60027-8
- Beringers Auftrag. Ullstein, Munich 2003, ISBN 3-550-08423-4
- Milenas Verlangen. Roman. Ullstein, Munich 2002, ISBN 3-550-08363-7
- Duell auf der Veddel. Ein Krimi-Märchen. Hamburger Abendblatt, Hamburg 2001, ISBN 3-921305-47-0
- Der Tod ist in der Stadt. Roman. Hoffmann & Campe, Hamburg 1998, ISBN 3-455-02294-4
- Für eine Hand voll Dollar. Jugendbuch. Elefanten Press bei Bertelsmann 1998, ISBN 3-570-14560-3
- Eisnester. Gedichte. Hoffmann & Campe, Hamburg 1996, ISBN 3-455-02292-8
- Kein fremder Land. 1993, ISBN 3-455-02287-1
- Versteckt. Ein Kinderkrimi. Espresso/Elef.Press, Berlin 1993, ISBN 3-88520-430-4

Mysteries in the Bella Block series:

- Zwischen Nacht und Tag. Hoffmann & Campe, Hamburg 2012, ISBN 978-3-455-40424-1
- Schweigen oder Sterben. Hoffmann & Campe, Hamburg 2007, ISBN 978-3-455-40076-2
- Georgia. Hoffmann & Campe, Hamburg 2006, ISBN 3-455-40013-2
- Bella Ciao. Ullstein, Munich 2004, ISBN 3-548-25804-2
- Die schöne Mörderin. Ullstein, Berlin 2001, ISBN 3-89834-032-5
- Die Frau vom Meer. Hoffmann & Campe, Hamburg 2000, ISBN 3-455-02295-2
- Dschingis Khans Tochter. Hoffmann & Campe, Hamburg 1996, ISBN 3-455-02293-6
- Auf Leben und Tod.. Hoffmann & Campe 1995, ISBN 3-455-02289-8
- Ein Fall mit Liebe. Hoffmann & Campe 1994, ISBN 3-625-20394-4
- Kinderkorn. Galgenberg, Hamburg 1991, ISBN 3-925387-89-7
- Die Insel. Galgenberg, Hamburg 1990, ISBN 3-925387-74-9
- Der Krieg, der Tod, die Pest. Galgenberg, Hamburg 1990, ISBN 3-925387-69-2
- Moskau meine Liebe. Galgenberg, Hamburg 1989, ISBN 3-925387-59-5
- Nachsaison. Galgenberg, Hamburg 1989, ISBN 3-925387-46-3
- Weinschröter, du mußt hängen. Galgenberg, Hamburg 1988, ISBN 3-925387-41-2
