= Egon Monk =

Egon Monk (18 May 1927 – 28 February 2007) was a German actor, director and author.

== Biography ==
Monk was born in Berlin, Germany and grew up in Berlin-Wedding. He served in the German Air Force in World War II (1943–1945). After the war he became an actor. Later he worked for RIAS Berlin (1954–1959) and for the NDR. He died in Hamburg, Germany.

In 2019, a two-part German-Austrian-Czech fictional film was produced as a biopic and docudrama for television from 2019. It deals with the life and work of the playwright and poet Bertolt Brecht and features 'Egon Monk' portrayed by Franz Dinda. The film was shot based on the script by Heinrich Breloer and directed by him. The premiere took place at the 2019 Berlinale.

== Awards and honors ==
Monk won three Teleplay Awards at the Baden-Baden TV Film Festival (1966, 1973, 1989) and one German Critics Association Award (1988).

== Filmography ==
=== Television director ===
- Die Gewehre der Frau Carrar (1953) — (based on Señora Carrar's Rifles)
- Das Geld, das auf der Straße liegt (1958) — (based on a play by Werner Jörg Lüddecke)
- Die Brüder (1958) — (based on Pierre et Jean)
- Life of Galileo (1962) — (based on Life of Galileo)
- Anfrage (1962) — (based on a novel by Christian Geissler)
- Schlachtvieh (1963) — (screenplay by Christian Geissler)
- Wassa Schelesnowa (1963) — (based on Vassa Zheleznova)
- Mauern (1963) — (screenplay by Gunther R. Lys)
- Friday in Wilhelmsburg (1964) — (screenplay by Christian Geissler)
- Ein Tag – Bericht aus einem deutschen Konzentrationslager 1939 (1965) — (based on a memoir by Gunther R. Lys)
- The Moment of Peace (1965, TV anthology film, co-directors: Georges Franju, Tadeusz Konwicki)
- Preis der Freiheit (1966) — (screenplay by Dieter Meichsner)
- Über den Gehorsam. Szenen aus Deutschland, wo die Unterwerfung des eigenen Willens unter einen fremden als Tugend gilt (1968)
- Goldene Städte (1969) — (based on Their Very Own and Golden City by Arnold Wesker)
- Die Räuber (1969) — (based on The Robbers)
- Industrielandschaft mit Einzelhändlern (1970)
- Bauern, Bonzen und Bomben (1973, TV miniseries) — (based on a novel by Hans Fallada)
- Die Gewehre der Frau Carrar (1975) — (based on Señora Carrar's Rifles)
- The Oppermanns (1983, TV film) — (based on The Oppermanns)
- Die Bertinis (1988, TV miniseries) — (based on a novel by Ralph Giordano)
