= I'm an Elephant, Madame =

1969 film

- Directed by: Peter Zadek
- Written by: Wolfgang Menge; Robert Muller; Thomas Valentin; Peter Zadek
- Produced by: Ernst Liesenhoff; Ernst Steinlechner
- Starring: Heinz Baumann
- Cinematography: Gérard Vandenberg
- Edited by: Herbert Taschner
- Production company: Iduna Film Produktiongesellschaft
- Distributed by: Obelisk Film
- Release date: 6 March 1969
- Running time: 100 minutes
- Country: West Germany
- Language: German

I'm an Elephant, Madame (German: Ich bin ein Elefant, Madame) is a 1969 West German drama film directed by Peter Zadek. It was entered into the 19th Berlin International Film Festival, where it won a Silver Bear award.

== Cast ==
- Heinz Baumann as Dr. Nemitz
- Wolfgang Schneider as Rull, a schoolboy
- Guido Baumann as Interviewer
- Margot Trooger as Mrs. Nemitz
- Günther Lüders as Dr. Hartmann
- Tankred Dorst as Violat
- Peter Palitzsch as Fiege
- Rolf Becker as Rohwedder
- Werner Dahms as Wieland
- Robert Dietl as Mueller-Frank
- Maja Eigen as Billa, a schoolgirl
- Ilja Richter as Haverkamp, a schoolboy
