= Die Bertinis =

1982 novel by Ralph Giordano

- Author: Ralph Giordano
- Language: German
- Subject: Autobiography
- Set in: Germany
- Publication date: 1982
- Publication place: Germany

Die Bertinis is a novel by Ralph Giordano published in 1982. The book tells the story of a German-Italian family from the late 19th century until the end of the Second World War. It is heavily autobiographical, focusing largely on the life of Giordano and his experiences in Hamburg during the period of National Socialism.

== Television series ==
Die Bertinis
- Created by: Egon Monk
- Starring: Hannelore Hoger; Peter Fitz; Elfriede Kuzmany
- Country of origin: Germany
- No. of seasons: 1
- No. of episodes: 5

Original release
- Network: ZDF
- Release: 31 October – 8 November 1988

Die Bertinis was made into a ZDF television series in 1988.

== See also ==
- List of German television series
