= Antonis Samarakis =

Greek writer (1919–2003)

- Αντώνης Σαμαράκης
- Born: 16 August 1919; Athens, Kingdom of Greece
- Died: 8 August 2003 (aged 83); Pylos, Greece
- Occupation: Writer
- Spouse: Eleni Kourebana (m. 1963)
- Writing career
- Language: Modern Greek
- Notable works: Hope Wanted (1954); I Refuse (1961); The Flaw (1965); The Passport (1973)
- Notable awards: Greek State Short Story Award (1962); Award of the Twelve – Kostas Ouranis Award (1966); Grand Prix de Littérature Policière (1970); Knight's Cross of the Ordre des Arts et des Lettres (1995)

Antonis Samarakis (Greek: Αντώνης Σαμαράκης; August 16, 1919 – August 8, 2003) was a Greek writer of the post-war generation whose work explores themes of humanism, dangers of totalitarianism and aspects of social alienation. He is considered one of the most prolific Greek writers, and the second most translated one, after Nikos Kazantzakis.

== Biography ==
Antonis Samarakis was born in Athens in 1919. After graduating from the Varvakeio High School, he studied law at the University of Athens. During the Nazi occupation he participated in the Greek resistance by joining the National Solidarity, a precursor of the main leftwing resistance organisation, the National Liberation Front. In 1944 he was arrested by the Nazis and sentenced to death, but managed to escape. In 1963 he married Eleni Kourebana.

Samarakis worked as an expert of the International Labour Organization of the United Nations in many countries on social issues and in 1989 he was named a UNICEF Goodwill Ambassador for the children of the world.

His first substantial appearance in the literary field took place in 1954 with the publication of the collection of short stories Hope Wanted. He is one of the most translated Greek prose writers, as his works have been translated into more than 30 languages. In 1965 he published The Flaw, his best known work. A rare example of Greek police literature, part thriller and part political satire, it won Samarakis world-wide praise and brought him in contact with some of the great writers of the era. In 1975, it was made into a movie under the title La faille (translated as Weak Spot in English) directed by Peter Fleischmann.

In 1973 he wrote his longest short story, The Passport, which reflects his experiences under the Regime of the Colonels, when he was denied a passport unless he wrote something favourable about the regime. The story is not merely autobiographical but generalises the plight of the innocent victim of a totalitarian regime.

Samarakis had great critical attention and commercial success in continental Europe, especially Germany, Scandinavia and France, than the US or Britain. His work was held in high regard by writers like Arthur Koestler, Georges Simenon and Agatha Christie. The film maker Luis Buñuel was also a great fan of his work.

Samarakis' work has a strong element of social complaint and reflects his personal concerns about the present and the future of modern society. He used simple language and an unpretentious style and approached his subjects from a strongly anthropocentric angle. He was characterized by his love for the young. It was his idea for the Greek State to create a Youth Parliament, leading to the organization of informal meetings of the Parliament, where young people from all over the country are given the floor.

Antonis Samarakis died on August 8, 2003 in Pylos. According to his wishes, his body was donated to the University of Athens for research by medical students.

== Awards ==
- Greek State Short Story Award. (1962 for I Refuse)
- Award of the Twelve – Kostas Ouranis Award. (1966 for The Flaw)
- Grand Prix de Littérature Policière in France. (1970 for The Flaw)
- Europalia. (1982, for his total offering)
- Knight's Cross of the Ordre des Arts et des Lettres. (1995)
- State Prize for Arts and Literature. (1995, France)

== Works ==
- Hope Wanted/Ζητείται Ελπίς (1954)
- Danger Signal/Σήμα κινδύνου (1959)
- I Refuse/Αρνούμαι (1961)
- Office of Ideas/Γραφείον Ιδεών (1962)
- The Flaw/Το Λάθος (1965)
- The Passport/Το Διαβατήριο (1973)
- Contra/Κόντρα (1992)
- Autobiography/Αυτοβιογραφία (1919–1996)
