= Jokehnen =

- Starring: Armin Mueller-Stahl; Ursela Monn; Beate Finckh; Else Quecke; Monica Bleibtreu; Irmgard Riessen
- Country of origin: Germany
- No. of seasons: 1
- No. of episodes: 3

Production
- Running time: 270 min.

Original release
- Network: ZDF
- Release: 21 June – 23 June 1987

Jokehnen is a German television series, based on a novel by Arno Surminski.

== See also ==
- List of German television series
