= List of German plays =

This is a list of German plays:

== A ==
- Amphitryon (1807), by Heinrich von Kleist
- Der aufhaltsame Aufstieg des Arturo Ui (1941) by Bertolt Brecht
- Aufstieg und Fall der Stadt Mahagonny (1927–1930), by Bertolt Brecht

== B ==
- Baal (1918/1923), by Bertolt Brecht
- Die Hermannsschlacht (1808), by Heinrich von Kleist
- Der Biberpelz (1893), by Gerhart Hauptmann
- Der Bogen des Odysseus (1914), by Gerhart Hauptmann
- The Burghers of Calais (Die Bürger von Calais, 1913) by Georg Kaiser

== C ==
- Der kaukasische Kreidekreis (1943–45/1948), by Bertolt Brecht
- Kollege Crampton (1892), by Gerhart Hauptmann

== D ==
- Don Karlos, Infant von Spanien (1787), by Friedrich Schiller
- Don Juan (1952/1954), by Bertolt Brecht

== E ==
- Egmont (1787), by Johann Wolfgang von Goethe
- Elga (1896), by Gerhart Hauptmann
- Emilia Galotti (1772), by Gotthold Ephraim Lessing
- Erwin und Elmire (1775), by Johann Wolfgang von Goethe

== F ==
- Die Familie Schroffenstein, 1803), by Heinrich von Kleist
- Faust (1808), by Johann Wolfgang von Goethe
- Fiorenza (1907), by Thomas Mann
- Florian Geyer (1896), by Gerhart Hauptmann
- Frühlings Erwachen (1891), by Frank Wedekind
- Furcht und Elend des Dritten Reiches (1935–38/1938), by Bertolt Brecht
- Fuhrmann Henschel (1898), by Gerhart Hauptmann

== G ==
- Gabriel Schilling's Flight (Gabriel Schillings Flucht, (1912), by Gerhart Hauptmann
- Die Gewehre der Frau Carrar (1937/1937), by Bertolt Brecht
- Götz von Berlichingen (1773), by Johann Wolfgang von Goethe
- Griselda (1909), by Gerhart Hauptmann
- Die goldene Harfe (1933), by Gerhart Hauptmann

== H ==
- Hasemanns Töchter (1877), by Adolphe L'Arronge
- Haus Lonei (1880), by Adolphe L'Arronge
- Helios (1896) fragment, by Gerhart Hauptmann
- Herbert Engelmann (1921–26), by Gerhart Hauptmann
- Die Räuber, 1781), by Friedrich Schiller

== I ==
- Iphigenie auf Tauris (1779), by Johann Wolfgang von Goethe
- Iphigenie in Delphi (1941), by Gerhart Hauptmann
- Im Dickicht der Städte (1921–24/1923), by Bertolt Brecht
- Hanneles Himmelfahrt (1893), by Gerhart Hauptmann

== J ==
- Die Jungfrau von Orleans (1801), by Friedrich Schiller

== K ==
- Kabale und Liebe (1784), by Friedrich Schiller
- Das Käthchen von Heilbronn (1807–1808), by Heinrich von Kleist

== L ==
- Die Laune des Verliebten (1779), by Johann Wolfgang von Goethe
- Leben des Galilei (1937–39/1943), by Bertolt Brecht
- Leonce und Lena (1836), by Georg Büchner

== M ==
- Maria Stuart (1800), by Friedrich Schiller
- Mein Leopold (1873), by Adolphe L'Arronge
- Minna von Barnhelm' (1767), by Gotthold Ephraim Lessing
- Miß Sara Sampson (1755), by Gotthold Ephraim Lessing
- Von morgens bis mitternachts (1912), by Georg Kaiser
- Mutter Courage und ihre Kinder (1938–39/1941), by Bertolt Brecht

== N ==
- Nathan der Weise (1779), by Gotthold Ephraim Lessing
- Die natürliche Tochter (1803), by Johann Wolfgang von Goethe
- Die Nibelungen (c. 1860), by Christian Friedrich Hebbel

== P ==
- Penthesilea (1808), by Heinrich von Kleist
- Peter Brauer (1912), by Gerhart Hauptmann
- Prinz Friedrich von Homburg (1809–10), by Heinrich von Kleist
- Der Protagonist (1920), by Georg Kaiser

== R ==
- Die Ratten (1911), by Gerhart Hauptmann
- Robert Guiskard (1802), by Heinrich von Kleist
- Rose Bernd (1903), by Gerhart Hauptmann
- Der rote Hahn (1901), by Gerhart Hauptmann

== S ==
- Die Sieben Todsünden der Kleinbürger (1933), by Bertolt Brecht

== U ==
- Und Pippa Tanzt! (1906), by Gerhart Hauptmann

== T ==
- Trommeln in der Nacht (1918–20/1922), by Bertolt Brecht
- Torquato Tasso (1790), by Johann Wolfgang von Goethe
- Turandot, Prinzessin von China (1801), by Friedrich Schiller

== V ==
- Veland (1925), by Gerhart Hauptmann
- Die versunkene Glocke (1896), by Gerhart Hauptmann
- Die Verschwörung des Fiesco zu Genua (1783), by Friedrich Schiller
- Vor Sonnenaufgang (1887–89), by Gerhart Hauptmann

== W ==
- Wallenstein (1800), by Friedrich Schiller
- Die Weber (1892), by Gerhart Hauptmann
- Wilhelm Tell (1804), by Friedrich Schiller
- Woyzeck (1837), by Georg Büchner

== Z ==
- Der zerbrochne Krug (1811), by Heinrich von Kleist

== See also ==
- List of German-language playwrights
- Bertolt Brecht § Plays and screenplays
- List of American plays
