= Irmgard Riessen =

German film and television actress (born 1944)

- Born: 1944 (age 81–82); Fehmarn, Germany
- Occupation: Actress
- Years active: 1966- (film & TV)

Irmgard Riessen is a German film and television actress.

== Selected filmography ==
- Einer fehlt beim Kurkonzert (1968, TV film)
- Angels of the Street (1969)
- The Sex Nest (1970)
- Der Sonne entgegen (1985, TV series)
- Jokehnen (1987, TV miniseries)
- Schulz & Schulz (1991–1993, TV series)
