= The Death of the White Stallion =

1985 film

- Film poster
- Directed by: Christian Ziewer
- Written by: Christian Ziewer
- Starring: Thomas Anzenhofer
- Cinematography: Gérard Vandenberg
- Release date: 3 October 1985
- Running time: 111 minutes
- Country: West Germany
- Language: German

The Death of the White Stallion (German: Der Tod des weißen Pferdes) is a 1985 West German drama film directed by Christian Ziewer. It was entered into the 35th Berlin International Film Festival.

== Cast ==
- Thomas Anzenhofer as Veit
- Péter Franke as Kilian Feuerbacher
- Udo Samel as Father Andreas
- Angela Schanelec as Anna
- Dietmar Schönherr as Caspar von Schenkenstein
- Jürgen von Alten
- Ulrich Wildgruber as Abbot Georg
