= The Broken Jug =

1808 comedy by Heinrich von Kleist

Der zerbrochene Krug The Broken Jug
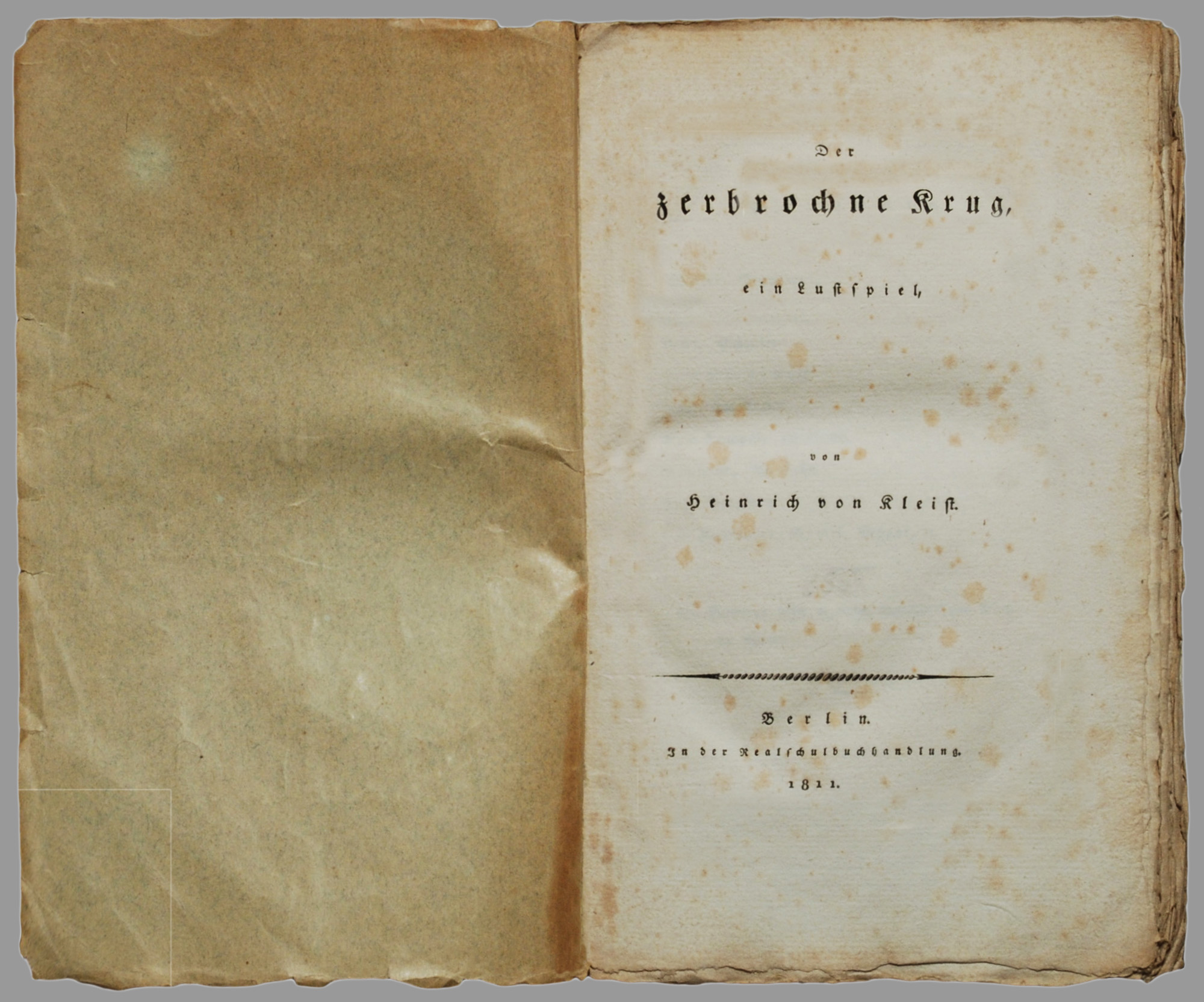
- First edition 1811
- Original language: German
- Written by: Heinrich von Kleist
- Characters: Adam, Eve, Licht, Walter, Frau Marthe, Ruprecht

Premiere
- Date: 2 March 1808

The Broken Jug (German: Der zerbrochne Krug, pronounced [deːɐ̯ t͡sɛɐ̯.ˈbʁɔx.nə kʁuːk], also sometimes translated The Broken Pitcher) is a comedy written by the German playwright Heinrich von Kleist. Kleist first conceived the idea for the play in 1801 after looking at a copper engraving in Heinrich Zschokke's house entitled "Le juge, ou la cruche cassée". In 1803, challenged over his ability to write comedy, Kleist dictated the first three scenes of the play, though it was not completed until 1806. Johann Wolfgang von Goethe first staged the play in Weimar, where it premiered on 2 March 1808.

The Broken Jug follows the story of a judge who presides over a trial where he has to settle the question of who had broken a jug in the room of a young woman late one night, while himself acting highly suspiciously both before and throughout the whole trial.

== Characters ==
- Adam – the judge.
- Eve – a country girl.
- Licht – the judge's secretary.
- Walter – the man who comes to inspect Adam and the way he runs his court.
- Frau Marthe – Eve's mother.
- Ruprecht – a young man who is in love with Eve.

== Plot ==
Adam, the judge of the small town of Huisum in the Netherlands, is found dressing a wound on his leg by his secretary Licht, when Licht enters Adam's home in the morning. Licht also notices a large gash on Adam's face. Adam tells Licht that he received these wounds when he fell down after getting out of bed this morning and hit his head on the fireplace. Licht also comments on Adam's clubfoot.

Licht informs Adam that Walter, a government inspector who travels through the country to inspect the finances and the proceedings of the town courts, will arrive this day to take a look at Adam's court. Licht also tells Adam that a judge in a neighboring town has tried to commit suicide after Walter found problems at the court. Additionally, today is court day, and no one can find Adam's wig, with Adam's maidservant insisting that Adam arrived home without the wig late last evening.

When Walter arrives, he insists that Adam immediately start the day's trial. The parties are the plaintiff Marthe, a widowed farmer who is there with her daughter Eve and the defendant, Ruprecht, Eve's fiancé together with his father, Veit. Before the trial Eve tries to speak to Ruprecht, who rejects her and calls her a harlot. Adam also speaks to the parties before the trial, especially Eve, seemingly trying to influence her testimony. Walter admonishes Adam and requests him to start the official trial immediately.

When the trial starts, an enraged Marthe accuses Ruprecht of having destroyed a water jug which was intricately painted and had rich family history and because of that had a large emotional value to her. Other people suggest that her disappointment of Ruprecht's treatment of Eve may also have something to do with her anger. Marthe claims that she found Ruprecht in Eve's room last night with the door broken down and the jug broken. She also claims that Eve had accused Ruprecht of breaking the jug.

When it is Ruprecht's turn to testify, he explains that he secretly went to Eve's home and heard her talk with somebody in her room. He mentions that he suspected it to be a man called Lebrecht, who had previously shown interest in Eve. When Adam hears that Lebrecht is suspected, he eagerly requests that information to be noted in the protocol. Ruprecht says that he broke down the door, entered the room and saw someone flee through the window. He was able to hit the fleeing man twice over the head with a broken off door handle but could not identify the person. He also admits that he is not absolutely sure if it was him or the fleeing man who broke the jug in the chaos.

When it is Eve's turn, Adam again talks to her, seemingly trying to influence her testimony. Walter again admonishes him. Eve testifies that it was not Ruprecht who broke the jug but that she will not name the actual guilty person.

During a pause in the proceedings, Adam tries to get Walter drunk. Then, Brigitte, a lodger in Marthe's house arrives with Licht and a wig in her hand. She states that she found the wig last night in Marthe's garden and that she and Licht found a club-footed trail in the fresh snow and both followed that trail to Adam's house.

Walter asks Adam to come clean but Adam refuses and instead hands down his ruling: Ruprecht is convicted and shall go to jail for his insubordination against the court. Eve now exclaims that it was Adam who was in her room last night and who broke the jug while fleeing. An enraged Ruprecht attacks Adam, who flees the court room unharmed. Walter ensures Ruprecht that his conviction will be overturned, Ruprecht and Eve reconcile and their parents approve of their wedding.

== Adaptations ==
In 1937 a German film of the same title was released with Emil Jannings in the lead. It is also a 1941 opera by Viktor Ullmann. In 1944 it was produced as a film in Mexico by the German director Alfredo B. Crevenna under the title Adam, Eve and the Devil.

In 1958, the Stratford Festival produced an adaptation by Donald Harron and directed by Michael Langham which toured in Canada and to the Phoenix Theatre in New York. The Irish author, John Banville, adapted the play, setting it in a famine-stricken Irish village. It had its first production in Dublin in 1994. In Indonesia, Studiklub Teater Bandung (STB) produced adaption by Suyatna Anirun with Indonesian title "Jambangan yang Pecah" in 1982.

== See also ==
- List of German plays

== Sources ==
- Banham, Martin, ed. 1998. The Cambridge Guide to Theatre. Cambridge: Cambridge University Press. ISBN 0-521-43437-8.
- Helbling, Robert. 1975. The Major Works of Heinrich von Kleist. New York: New Directions. ISBN 0-8112-0563-0.
- Lamport, Francis John. 1990. German Classical Drama: Theatre, Humanity and Nation, 1750–1870. Cambridge: Cambridge University Press. ISBN 0-521-36270-9.
