= Salmonberries (film) =

1991 film directed by Percy Adlon

- DVD cover
- Directed by: Percy Adlon
- Written by: Percy Adlon; Felix Adlon
- Produced by: Eleonore Adlon; Jamie Beardsley; Beverly J. Graf
- Starring: k.d. lang; Rosel Zech; Oscar Kawagley
- Cinematography: Tom Sigel
- Edited by: Conrad M. Gonzalez
- Music by: Bob Telson
- Distributed by: Cineplex Odeon Films (Canada)
- Release date: 1991
- Running time: 95 minutes
- Country: Germany
- Languages: English; German with subtitles

Salmonberries is a 1991 German drama film directed by Percy Adlon and written by Adlon and his son Felix Adlon. It stars k.d. lang as Kotzebue, an orphaned Eskimo and young woman of androgynous appearance who works as a (male) miner in Alaska, and Rosel Zech as Roswitha, an East German exiled and widowed librarian. The film takes place in Kotzebue, Alaska and Berlin, Germany, shortly after reunification; the dialog is mostly English but includes some German with English subtitles.

The film's title takes its name from the endless jars of preserved berries that line the walls of Roswitha's bedroom.

Singer k.d. lang performs an evocative ballad, "Barefoot," in the film, it was co-written by k.d. lang and Bob Telson.

After lang had asked Adlon to direct a music video for her, ("So in Love" for the AIDS-benefit Red Hot + Blue compilation album) he wrote the script of "Salmonberries" especially for her.

== Cast ==
- Oscar Kawagley as Butch
- Rosel Zech as Roswitha
- k.d. lang as Kotzebue
- Eugene Omiak as Gvy
- Wayne Waterman as Ronnie
- Jane Lind as Noayak
- Chuck Connors as Bingo Chuck
- Alvira H. Downey as Izzy
- Wolfgang Steinberg as Albert
- Christel Merian as Albert's wife
- George Barril as Bingo attendant
- Gary Albers as Tight rope walker

== Awards ==
Salmonberries has won several awards:

- Grand Prix des Amériques (Best Film), Montreal World Film Festival
- Best Actress, Rosel Zech, Bavarian Film Awards
- Best Production, Eleonore Adlon, Bavarian Film Awards

== Critical reception ==
Janet Maslin, in her 1994 review of the film for The New York Times, called it a "halting, awkward effort" with "stilted direction" and "sharp camera angles, arty editing." It has an "uneasy acting debut" by k.d lang, but Rosel Zech has a "warmth and naturalness."

Kevin Thomas of the L.A. Times in 1994, said the film was "endearing, remarkably assured and stunning-looking," and with "the utmost sensitivity, Adlon raises crucial questions of cultural and sexual identity."

It was reviewed by Timeout Magazine and NF stated that it was a "slight, quirky but often moving film," and "real praise goes to the two stars for breathing so much human warmth into some chilly scenes of winter."

On Rotten Tomatoes, it has a score of 67% based on 9 reviews.
