= The Aggression =

1987 West German film

- German: Der Angriff
- Directed by: Theodor Kotulla
- Written by: Theodor Kotulla; Günter Seuren
- Produced by: Willi Segler; Michael Wolkenstein
- Starring: Pascale Petit; Michael König
- Cinematography: Jacques Steyn
- Edited by: Susanne Hartmann
- Music by: Eberhard Weber
- Production companies: Iduna Film Produktiongesellschaft; ZDF
- Distributed by: Obelisk Film
- Release date: 4 June 1987 (West Germany)
- Running time: 122 minutes
- Country: West Germany
- Language: German

The Aggression (released in West Germany as Der Angriff and in France as L'agression) is a 1987 West German film. It is a Heimatfilm. The plot centers around the attempted rape of pharmacist Ilse Trapmann, portrayed by Pascale Petit. The film takes the controversial stance that many West Germans have a latent desire to exert violence, despite the country's appearance to the contrary.

== Cast ==
- Pascale Petit
- Michael König
- Claude-Oliver Rudolph
- András Fricsay
- Lambert Hamel
- Henry van Lyck
- Franz Böhm
- Kyra Mladeck
- Ernst Weiner
- Mady Rahl
- Eva Maria Bayerwaltes
- Christiane Blumhoff
- Hannes Kaetner
- Anna Lange
- Nicolas Lansky
- Else Quecke
- Claus-Dieter Reents
- Angelika Rossaro
- Reiner Scheibe
- Ingrid Schoelderle
- Hansi Thoms-Evelt
- Erika Wackernagel
- Chriatian Weiner
- Hildegard Wensch
