= Ice Age (1975 film) =

1975 film

- West Germany release poster
- Directed by: Peter Zadek
- Written by: Tankred Dorst; Peter Zadek
- Starring: O. E. Hasse; Hannelore Hoger
- Cinematography: Gérard Vandenberg
- Edited by: Bettina Lewertoff
- Release date: 15 August 1975
- Running time: 115 minutes
- Countries: West Germany; Norway
- Language: German

Ice Age (German: Eiszeit) is a 1975 West German drama film directed by Peter Zadek. It was entered into the 25th Berlin International Film Festival. Eiszeit began as a theatre play by Tankred Dorst (1973) about Knut Hamsun, a Nobel Prize–winning author but unrepentant admirer of Nazi Germany.

== Cast ==
- O. E. Hasse as Old Man
- Hannelore Hoger as Vera
- Walter Schmidinger as Paul
- Ulrich Wildgruber as Oswald Kronen
- Elisabeth Stepanek as Sonja
- Helmut Qualtinger as Fitler / Old Officer
- Rosel Zech as Wanda
- Heinz Bennent as Pastor Holm
- Hans Hirschmüller as Reich
- Hermann Lause as Director of Savings Bank
- Diether Krebs as Consultant
- Helmut Erfurth as Greengrocer
- Hans Mahnke as Kristian
- Hans Wehrl as Kristian
- Ernst Konarek as Cook (as Ernst Kmoarek)
