= Heinz Baumann (actor) =

German actor (1928–2023)

- Born: 12 February 1928; Oldenburg, Free State of Oldenburg, Germany
- Died: 4 March 2023 (aged 95); Munich, Bavaria, Germany
- Occupations: Film actor Television actor
- Years active: 1954–2013

Heinz Baumann (12 February 1928 – 4 March 2023) was a German actor.

Baumann died in Munich, Bavaria on 4 March 2023, at the age of 95.

== Selected filmography ==
- Hubertus Castle (1954) - Tassilo
- The Haunted Castle (1960) - Martin Hartog
- Irrungen, Wirrungen (1966, TV film) - Pitt
- I'm an Elephant, Madame (1969) - Dr. Nemitz
- Und Jimmy ging zum Regenbogen (1971) - Gilbert Grant
- All People Will Be Brothers (1973) - William Carpenter
- Only the Wind Knows the Answer (1974) - Bankmanager Dr. Rüth
- Lobster (1976, TV series) - Lobster
- Der Geist der Mirabelle (1978, TV film), as Lauritz
- Der Gärtner von Toulouse (1982, TV film) - Querchartre
- Wehner – die unerzählte Geschichte (1993, TV film) - Herbert Wehner
- Diebinnen (1996)
- Doppelspiel (2006) - Otto Endlich
- The Last Ride (2012, TV film) - Rainer Wenserit
