= Weak Spot =

- Directed by: Peter Fleischmann
- Written by: Jean-Claude Carrière; Martin Walser
- Based on: The Flaw by Antonis Samarakis
- Produced by: Véra Belmont
- Starring: Michel Piccoli; Ugo Tognazzi
- Cinematography: Luciano Tovoli
- Edited by: Claudine Bouché
- Music by: Ennio Morricone
- Distributed by: Gaumont Distribution
- Release date: 1975
- Running time: 110 minutes
- Language: French

Weak Spot (French: La faille, Italian: La smagliatura, German: Der dritte Grad) is a 1975 French-Italian-German thriller film directed by Peter Fleischmann. It is based on the novel The Flaw by Antonis Samarakis.

== Cast ==
- Michel Piccoli: Michel
- Ugo Tognazzi: Ugo
- Mario Adorf: Manager
- Adriana Asti: Ugo's Girlfriend
- Dimos Starenios: Police superintendent
- Thymios Karakatsanis: Hairdresser
