= Oscar Kawagley =

American actor and anthropologist (1934–2011)

- Born: Angayuqaq Oscar Kawagley; November 8, 1934; Bethel, Alaska, U.S.
- Died: April 24, 2011 (aged 76); Fairbanks, Alaska, U.S.
- Occupations: Actor, teacher, anthropologist

Angayuqaq Oscar Kawagley (November 8, 1934 – April 24, 2011), best known as Oscar Kawagley, was a Yup'ik anthropologist, teacher and actor from Alaska. He was an associate professor of education at the University of Alaska, Fairbanks until his death in 2011. The Anchorage Daily News described him as "one of (Alaska's) most influential teachers and thinkers".

== Biography ==
=== Early life ===
Born in Mamterilleq, which is now known as Bethel. Kawagley lost his parents at a young age. Due to the loss of his parents, Kawagley was raised by his grandmother, Matilda Oscar.

=== Personal life ===
Kawagley was formerly married to Dolores Kawagley. He was also married to Anna Northway. Kawagley had 4 children: Sherry L. Colley, Sandra L. Haviland, Oscar K. Kawagley, and Tamaree D. Kawagley.

As of 2011, Kawagley had 10 grandchildren and five great-grandchildren.

=== Death ===
Kawagley died of renal cancer in Fairbanks, Alaska, in 2011 at the age of 76. His ashes were scattered after his cremation.

== Education ==
It is reported that Kawagley was the first Yupiaq to graduate from high school in Bethel, Alaska.

In 1958, Kawagley earned a Bachelor of Education (B.Ed.) from the University of Alaska Fairbanks (UAF). In 1968, he earned a Master's of Education (M.Ed.) from UAF. He then earned a superintendent certification (Ed. S) in 1987 from the UAF. He also has a Doctorate in Philosophy (Ph.D.) from the University of British Columbia in social and educational studies.

== Career ==
Kawagley's 1995 book A Yupiaq Worldview: a Pathway to Ecology and Spirit was an attempt to reconcile indigenous and Western worldviews from an indigenous perspective and was an important contribution to the field of ethnoecology. In the book, he developed the concept of "indigenous methodology", explaining how Western science can benefit from native ways of understanding and vice versa.

Before attaining his four university degrees, Kawagley served in the military as a Lieutenant in the U.S. Army Medical Service Corps.

Known as the first Yupiaq to become a teacher, Kawagley also had a career teaching in K-12 schools in Alaska.

Kawagley was also briefly the president of the Calista Corporation in Anchorage, Alaska, from 1977 to 1981.

After becoming an assistant professor at UAF in 1986, he taught courses in Cross-Cultural Studies and Education.

Kawagley served as co-director of the Alaska Rural Systemic Initiative. He also served as co-director of the Alaska Native Knowledge Network.

He held film and television roles. He performed in the film Salmonberries, appeared in the television show Northern Exposure, and contributed his voice to the elderly Denahi in the 2003 Disney film Brother Bear.

== Publications ==
=== Books ===
- Kawagley, A. O. (2006). A Yupiaq Worldview: A Pathway to Ecology and Spirit. United States: Waveland Press.
- Barnhardt, R., & Kawagley, A. O. (2010). Alaska native education: Views from within. Alaska Native Knowledge Network, Center for Cross-Cultural Studies, University of Alaska Fairbanks.
- Barnhardt, R., & Kawagley, A. O. (2011). Sharing our pathways: Native perspectives on education in Alaska. Alaska Native Knowledge Network, Center for Cross-Cultural Studies.

=== Miscellaneous articles ===
- Culture, Chaos & Complexity - Catalysts for Change in Indigenous Education by Angayuqaq Oscar Kawagley and Ray Barnhardt

=== University of Alaska Fairbanks Collective Works of Angayuqaq Oscar Kawagley ===
- The Yupiaq World View
- Alaska Native Holotropic Mind and Science
- An Alaska Native’s Theory on Events Leading To Loss of Spiritual Life
- Building a Foundation For Living Life That Feels Just Right
- Calista Region: Are We Too Dependent on Entitlements and Resource Extraction?
- Science In A Yupiaq Fish Camp And School: A Case Study of Ways of Knowing in a Yupiaq Eskimo Community
- Soft Technology: Adaptations to Culture and Environment
- To Be or Not To Be Thrust Into Antiquity
- When You Help Someone, and That Someone Feels Better—You Have Given Medicine
- Why Should Yupiaq Literacy Slow Student Progress?
- Yupiaq Education Revisited: Alaskan Native Education: History and Adaptation in the New Millenium
- The Indigenous Worldview of Yupiaq Culture: Its Scientific Nature and Relevance to the Practice and Teaching of Science
- Indigenous Knowledge Systems/Alaska Native Ways of Knowing
- A Native View of Culturally Relevant Education, an invited essay
- Alaska Native Education Research Requires That We Reach Into the Profound Silence of Self To Know
- Spirit, Knowledge, and Vision From our First Nations' Sages
- Yup'ik Ways of Knowing
- Active Reality Research
- Alaska First Nations Research Network
- Alaska RSI and Annenberg Rural Challenge Plans for a New Year
- An Alliance Between Humans and Creatures
- Blowing in the Wind
- Contaminants Have Found Us
- Earth, Air, Fire, Water and Spirit as a Foundation for Education
- How Does the Crane Keep Its Language?
- Identity-Creating Camps
- In The Maelstrom of Confusion, a Stilling Voice
- Joy Means Being Touched by the Elements of the Earth!
- Love and Caring for Balance
- Native Science
- Nurturing Native Languages
- Parenting & Teaching: One and the Same
- Revisiting Action-Oriented, Multi-Reality Research
- Revitalizing Harmony in Village and School Relationships
- The Cry of the Loon: Mysterious, Mournful, Remembering Place
- What Is This Thing Called “Love”?
- Yupiaq Mathematics: Pattern and Form in Space and Place

=== Reports ===
- A Long Journey: Alaska Onward to Excellence in Yupiit/Tuluksak Schools. Case Study. by Angayuqaq Oscar Kawagley and Ray Barnhardt

== Filmography ==
Year	Title	Role	Notes
1991	Salmonberries	Butch	Actor
1991	Northern Exposure	Bingo Player	Actor
2003	Brother Bear	Old Denahi/Inuit Narrator	Voice Actor, (final film role)

== Awards ==
- National Indian Education Association Lifetime Achievement Award
- American Educational Research Association Outstanding Scholarship Award
- Alaska Governor's Award for the Arts and Humanities
- Alaska Secondary School Principal's Association Distinguished Service Award
- Association of Village Council Presidents Award
