= Havoc (1972 film) =

1972 film

- Directed by: Peter Fleischmann
- Written by: Peter Fleischmann; Martin Walser
- Produced by: Peter Fleischmann
- Starring: Vitus Zeplichal
- Cinematography: Dib Lutfi
- Edited by: Odile Faillot
- Distributed by: United Artists
- Release date: 23 March 1972
- Running time: 106 minutes
- Country: West Germany
- Language: German

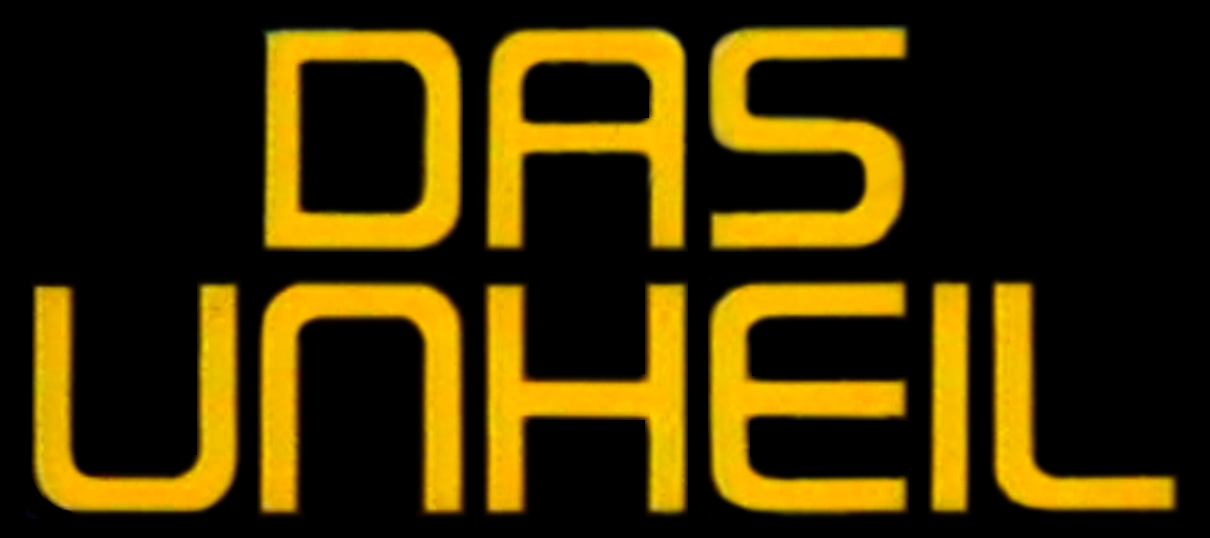
Original title

Havoc (German: Das Unheil) is a 1972 West German drama film directed, produced and co-written by Peter Fleischmann. It was entered into the 1972 Cannes Film Festival.

== Cast ==
- Vitus Zeplichal – Hille
- Reinhard Kolldehoff – Pfarrer
- Silke Kulik – Dimuth
- Helga Riedel-Hassenstein – Mutter
- Ingmar Zeisberg – Sibylle
- Werner Hess – Dr. Raucheisen
- Christoph Geraths – Drogist
- Ulrich Greiwe – Student
- Frédérique Jeantet – Roswitha
- Gabi Will – Gabi
- Eugen Pletsch – Schüler
- Kurt Wörtz – Schüler
- Bernhard Kimmel – Deserteur
- Ludwig Beyer – Alter Waldhornspieler
- Rex Aquam Aquarillo – Rentner
