= Martin Sperr =

German dramatist and actor (1944–2002)

- Born: September 14, 1944; Steinberg
- Died: April 6, 2002 (aged 57); Landshut
- Occupations: dramatist, actor

Martin Sperr (14 September 1944 – 6 April 2002) was a German dramatist and actor. He was born in Steinberg near Marklkofen and died in Landshut.

== Awards and honors ==
- 1978 Mülheimer Dramatikerpreis

== Works ==
- 1965 Jagdszenen aus Niederbayern
- 1967 Landshuter Erzählungen
- 1970 Koralle Meier
- 1970 Herr Bertolt Brecht sagt. Bei Brecht gelesen und für Kinder und andere Leute ausgesucht (with Monika Sperr)
- 1971 Münchner Freiheit
- 1971 Die Kunst der Zähmung (adapted from William Shakespeare's The Taming of the Shrew)
- 1977 Die Spitzeder
- 1979 Willst du Giraffen ohrfeigen, mußt du ihr Niveau haben (poems and drawings)

== Filmography ==
- 1969: Hunting Scenes from Bavaria (dir. Peter Fleischmann)
- 1970: Mathias Kneissl (dir. Reinhard Hauff)
- 1972: Strange City
- 1972: Adele Spitzeder (dir. Peer Raben)
- 1981–1983: Die Knapp-Familie (TV series)
