= The Man in Pyjamas =

1981 West German comedy film

- Directed by: Christian Rateuke; Hartmann Schmige
- Written by: Christian Rateuke; Hartmann Schmige
- Produced by: Carla Thoeren; Horst Wendlandt
- Starring: Otto Sander; Elke Sommer; Peter Fitz; Hermann Lause
- Cinematography: Heinz Hölscher
- Edited by: Sybille Windt
- Music by: Wilhelm Dieter Siebert
- Production company: Rialto Film
- Distributed by: Tobis Film
- Release date: 18 December 1981
- Running time: 95 minutes
- Country: West Germany
- Language: German

The Man in Pyjamas (German: Der Mann im Pyjama) is a 1981 West German comedy film directed by Christian Rateuke and Hartmann Schmige, starring Otto Sander and Elke Sommer. The film won the Ernst Lubitsch Award for best actor (Sander).

The film's sets were designed by art director Werner Achmann.

== Plot ==
The story, set in Berlin in 1981, centres around a man in his pajamas and bathrobe who goes out to buy cigarettes and experiences a series of events that have him chased by inept police officers, an angry husband, a taxi driver, and various other characters.

== Cast ==
- Otto Sander as Rudi
- Elke Sommer as Bärbel Lachmann
- Peter Fitz as Harry Lachmann, Detective inspector
- Hermann Lause as Bruno, Patrolman
- Erich Schwarz as Hans-Christian, Patrolman
- Friedrich G. Beckhaus as Otto Kaiser, Deputy Chief
- Karl-Heinz Vosgerau as Consul Becker
- Jochen Schroeder as Taxi driver
- Kurt Zips as Neighbour with the white poodle
- Pit Krüger as Volkswagen driver
- Ute Koska as Helga
- Günther Kieslich as Bank robber disguised as a sewer worker
- Tayfun Bademsoy as Turk

== Bibliography ==
- Eric Rentschler. West German film in the course of time: reflections on the twenty years since Oberhausen. Redgrave Publishing Company, 1984.
