= Melancholia (1989 film) =

1989 British-West German thriller film

- Directed by: Andi Engel
- Screenplay by: Andi Engel, Lewis Rodia
- Produced by: Colin MacCabe
- Starring: Jeroen Krabbé; Susannah York; Ulrich Wildgruber; Jane Gurnett; Kate Hardie; Saul Reichlin; John Sparkes; Detlef Berthelsen; Mouchette van Helsdingen; John Joyce
- Cinematography: Denis Crossan
- Edited by: Christopher Roth
- Music by: Simon Fisher Turner
- Production companies: BFI; Lichtblick
- Release date: 1989
- Running time: 87 minutes
- Countries: United Kingdom, West Germany
- Languages: English, German

Melancholia is a 1989 political thriller film directed by Andi Engel, combining elements of drama and crime. An international co-production of the United Kingdom and West Germany, the film stars Jeroen Krabbé, Susannah York, Ulrich Wildgruber, and Kate Hardie. It was the first film directed by Engel, a German-born, London-based former critic best known as a film distributor and exhibitor in Britain.

== Plot ==
David Keller, a German expatriate working as an art critic in London, was a militant in 1968 but has long since abandoned his political ideals. He receives a telephone call from his old friend Manfred in Hamburg, who asks him to assassinate Vargas, a Chilean torturer who is visiting London. Manfred later tells him that the killing is off, as Vargas can now be of use to their side. Keller is then approached by Sarah Yelin, whose husband was murdered by Vargas, and decides to carry out the assassination.

== Cast ==
- Jeroen Krabbé as David Keller
- Susannah York as Catherine Lanham Franck
- Ulrich Wildgruber as Manfred
- Jane Gurnett as Sarah Yelin
- Kate Hardie as Rachel Lanham Franck
- Saul Reichlin as Dr. Adolfo Vargas
- John Sparkes as Roger Dere
- Detlef Berthelsen as Dr. Berger
- Mouchette van Helsdingen as Receptionist
- John Joyce as Butcher

== Reception ==
Variety wrote that "the film raises questions about the use of violence to prevent further violence, and about the passivity of idealists. It doesn't play as a straight commercial thriller, but as a serious pic exploring provocative themes with intelligence." Tom Milne of Sight and Sound wrote that the film "not only avoids all the pitfalls of déjà vu, it manages to live up to the implications of its title without ever for a moment wallowing in gloomy self-flagellation."
