= Die Gewehre der Frau Carrar =

1953 film

- Based on: Señora Carrar's Rifles by Bertolt Brecht
- Directed by: Egon Monk
- Country of origin: East Germany
- Original language: German

Production
- Running time: 54 minutes

Original release
- Release: 1953

Die Gewehre der Frau Carrar was a 1953 East German live television production of the 1937 play Señora Carrar's Rifles by Bertolt Brecht.
