= Thymios Karakatsanis =

Greek actor (1940–2012)

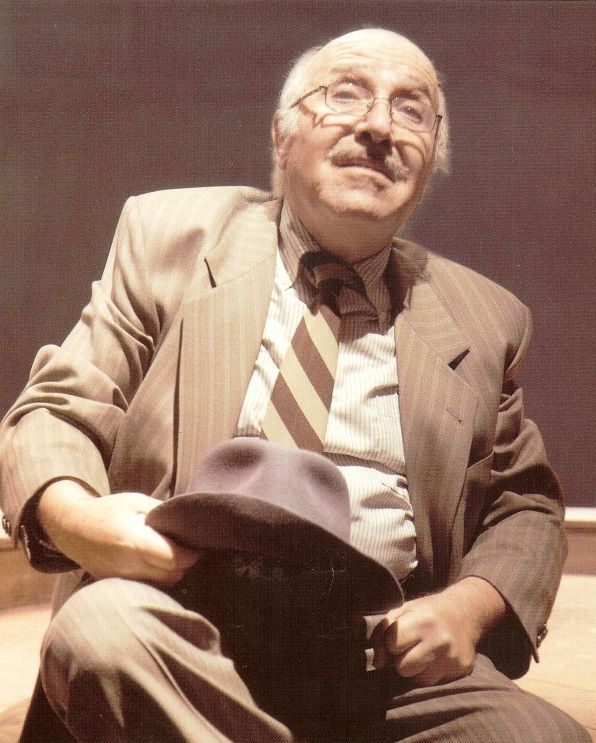
- Born: 8 December 1940; Piraeus, Greece
- Died: 30 June 2012 (aged 71); Athens, Greece
- Occupation: Actor

Thymios Karakatsanis (Greek: Θύμιος Καρακατσάνης; 8 December 1940 – 30 June 2012) was a Greek actor with a notable career in theatre. He was born in Piraeus on 8 December 1940. He studied at Art Theatre of Karolos Koun. His first professional role was in the play Thyrida of Tardieu in 1963. He appeared in a few films but he became well known mainly from his roles in the plays of Aristophanes. He played the role of Lysistrata three times. He appeared frequently at theatre of Ancient Epidavros. In 1978, he founded the group New Greek Stage and he presented famous plays, starting with the play Von Dimitrakis of Dimitris Psathas. In 1987 he won a theatre award for his role in Death of a Salesman of Arthur Miller. In the same period he also worked as a radio presenter. The play Death of a Salesman was his last role. He died on 30 June 2012 at the age of 72 years.

== Filmography ==
=== Cinema ===
- To pio lampro asteri (1967)
- I hartorihtra (1967)
- Boum Taratatzoum (1972)
- I Gynaikokratia (1973)
- La faille (1975)
- Oi Ntantades (1979)
- idou i Rodos (1979)
- Karavan Sarai (1986)

== Theatre ==
- Plutus by Aristophanes
- Peace by Aristophanes
- The Frogs by Aristophanes
- The Birds by Aristophanes
- Lysistrata by Aristophanes
- The Clouds by Aristophanes
- Tartuffe by Molière
- Death of a Salesman by Arthur Miller
- Von Dimitrakis by Dimitris Psathas
- The Sunshine Boys by Neil Simon
- The Good Soldier Švejk by Jaroslav Hašek
