= Hermann Lause =

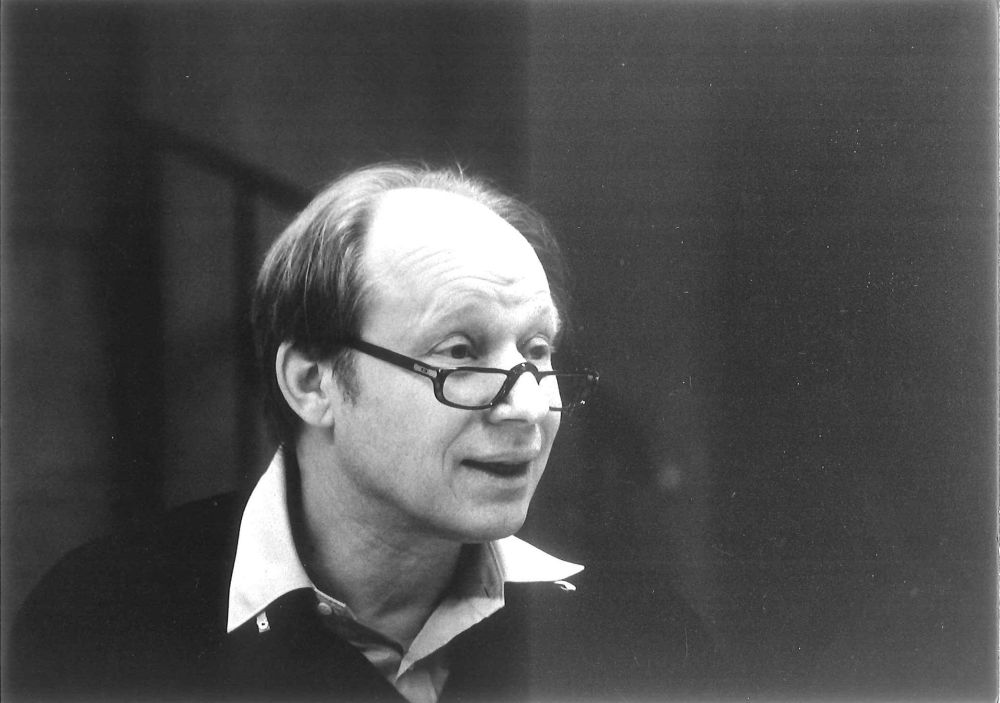
- Lause in 1990
- Born: 7 February 1939; Meppen, Germany
- Died: 28 March 2005 (aged 66); Hamburg, Germany
- Occupation: Actor
- Years active: 1966-2005

Hermann Lause (7 February 1939 - 28 March 2005) was a German film actor. He appeared in more than seventy films from 1966 to 2005. He died of cancer.

== Selected filmography ==
Film
Year	Title	Role	Notes
1975	Ice Age	Banker	
1978	On the Move	Hermann	
1980	The World That Summer	Father	TV film
1980	Fabian	Labude	
1981	No Terraced House for Robin Hood	Benno Dropsch	
1981	A Lot of Bills to Pay	Hermann Grueten	
1981	After Midnight	Algin Moder	
1981	The Man in Pyjamas	Bruno	
1983	Due to an Act of God	Pastor Fiedler	TV film
1983	The Roaring Fifties	Mario Schreiber	
1984	Super	Krause, policeman	
1987	Bang! You're Dead!	Peters	
1988	The Summer of the Hawk	Herbert Sasse	
1989	The State Chancellery	Reiner Pfeiffer	TV film
1991	Kollege Otto – Die Coop-Affäre	Informant	TV film
1992	Schtonk!	Kurt Glück	
2000	Rote Glut	Egon	TV film
2001	The Living Room Fountain	Dr. Boldinger	
2004	Head-On	Dr. Schiller	
2004	Die Stunde der Offiziere	Generaloberst Friedrich Fromm	TV film
