= Peter Fitz =

German actor (1931–2013)

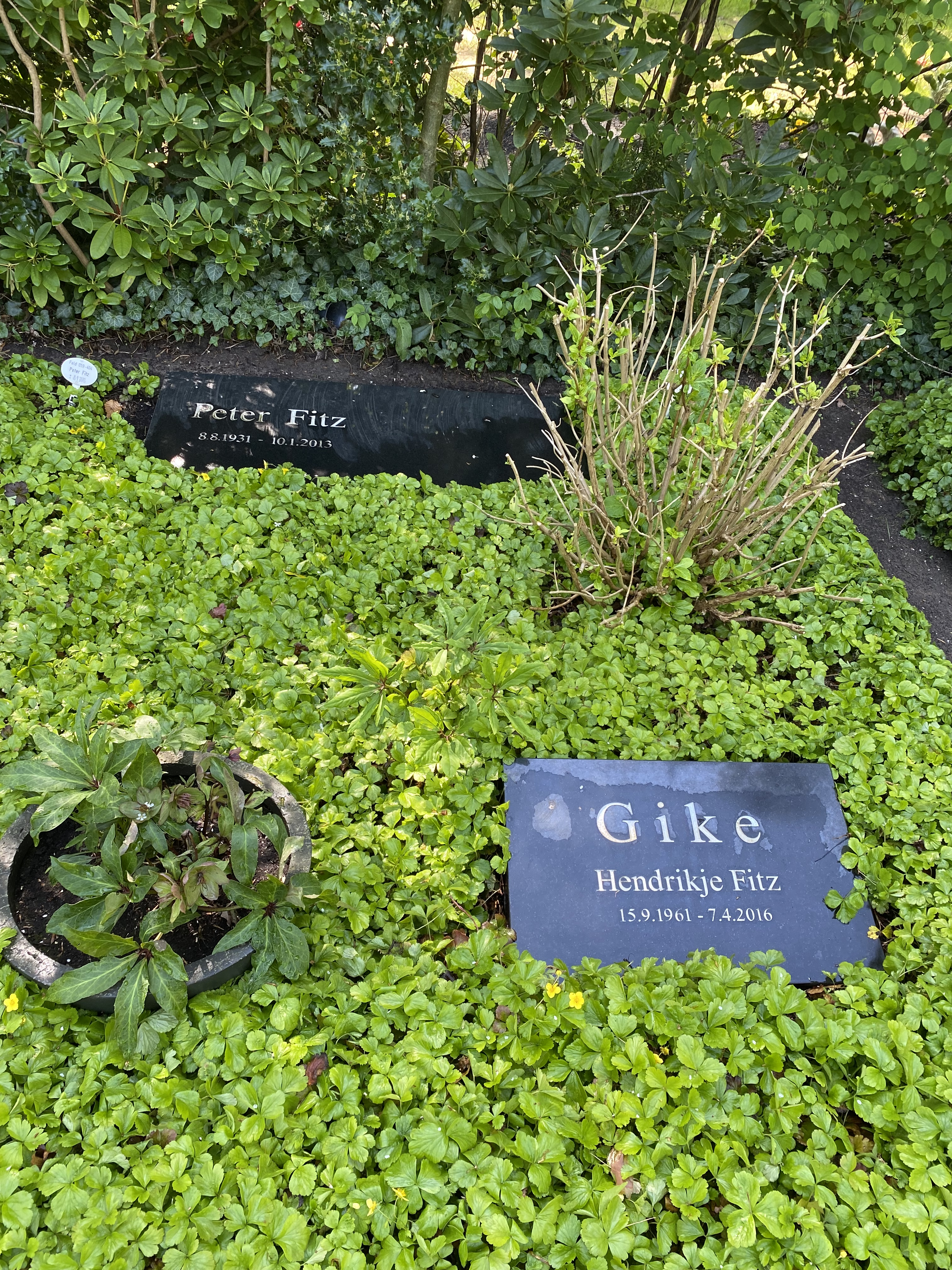
- Born: 8 August 1931; Kaiserslautern, Germany
- Died: 10 January 2013 (aged 81); Berlin, Germany
- Occupation: Actor
- Years active: 1954–2012

Peter Fitz (8 August 1931 – 10 January 2013) was a German stage and film actor.

== Biography ==
Fitz completed an apprenticeship at the drama school of the Deutsches Schauspielhaus in Hamburg in the 1950s. In the 1960s, engagements at the Schauspiel Frankfurt theatre followed. Director Peter Stein brought him into the ensemble of the Berlin Schaubühne theatre, where he worked under the direction of Stein as well as Klaus Michael Grüber.

During the course of his career, Fitz performed at all major German-language venues, such as the Vienna Burgtheater, the Munich Kammerspiele, Berlin's Schiller Theater, as well as the Salzburg Festival. In 1980 and 1983, he was voted Actor of the Year by the editors of Theater heute magazine.

Fitz' theater work took precedence throughout his career, but he also appeared in a number of films and television productions. Some of these include the 1987 film Au revoir les enfants and The Wannsee Conference in 1984. In 1996, Fitz was nominated for the German Film Award for his portrayal of Reinhold Schünzel in Hans-Christoph Blumenberg's One More Kiss and He's Dead!. He was also known to a broad television audience through crime films and series, as well as for his voice acting work.

Peter Fitz died in his Berlin apartment on 10 January 2013, at the age of 81. He is the father of actress Hendrikje Fitz (1961–2016) and actor Florian Fitz (born 1967). He is buried in the Waldfriedhof Zehlendorf Berlin forest cemetery. His daughter was buried next to him upon her death in 2016.

== Selected filmography ==
=== Film ===
List of film appearances, with year, title, and role shown
Year	Title	Role	Notes
1981	The Man in Pyjamas	Harry Lachmann	
1987	Au revoir les enfants	Dr. Müller	
1990	Dr. M	Veidt	
1993	Just a Matter of Duty	Anwalt	
1996	One More Kiss and He's Dead!	Reinhold Schünzel	
1996	Conversation with the Beast	Dr. Segebrecht	
1997	14 Days to Life	Director	
1998	23	Brückner	
1999	Moloch	Adolf Hitler	Voice
2000	Werckmeister Harmonies	György Eszter	
2003	September	Isidor Krantz	
2004	Soundless	Martin Hinrich	
2004	Laura's Star	Mond	Voice, animated film

=== Television ===
List of television appearances, with year, title, and role shown
Year	Title	Role	Notes
1982–1985	Schwarz Rot Gold		2 episodes
1984	The Wannsee Conference	Dr. Wilhelm Stuckart	TV movie
1988–1997	Tatort	Professor Luiz Santos / Jahnke / Branch manager Steinhoff	3 episodes
1998	Polizeiruf 110	Herbert Krolikowski	1 episode
1999	Tatort	Norbert's father	1 episode
2001	Rosmersholm	Rektor Kroll	TV movie
2004	Wilsberg	Kurt Vosswinkel	1 episode
2004	Die Konferenz	Dr. Roman Branzger	TV movie
2006	Bella Block	Pastor Justus Bauernfeind	1 episode

== Awards and recognition ==
- 1980, 1983: Actor of the Year, Theater heute magazine
- 1996: Nominated for German Film Award for One More Kiss and He's Dead
- 2001: Nestroy Theatre Prize for best supporting role in Rosmersholm
- 2005: Hessian TV Award as an ensemble member of the film Die Konferenz

== Literature ==
- Hermann J. Huber: Langen Müller’s Schauspielerlexikon der Gegenwart. Deutschland. Österreich. Schweiz. Albert Langen • Georg Müller Verlag GmbH, München • Wien 1986, ISBN 3-7844-2058-3, S. 249.
- C. Bernd Sucher (Hrsg.): Theaterlexikon. Autoren, Regisseure, Schauspieler, Dramaturgen, Bühnenbildner, Kritiker. Von Christine Dössel und Marietta Piekenbrock unter Mitwirkung von Jean-Claude Kuner und C. Bernd Sucher. 2. Auflage. Deutscher Taschenbuch-Verlag, München 1999, ISBN 3-423-03322-3, S. 185.
- Kay Weniger: Das große Personenlexikon des Films. Die Schauspieler, Regisseure, Kameraleute, Produzenten, Komponisten, Drehbuchautoren, Filmarchitekten, Ausstatter, Kostümbildner, Cutter, Tontechniker, Maskenbildner und Special Effects Designer des 20. Jahrhunderts. Band 2: C – F. John Paddy Carstairs – Peter Fitz. Schwarzkopf und Schwarzkopf, Berlin 2001, ISBN 3-89602-340-3, S. 698 f.
