= The Hamburg Syndrome =

1979 science fiction film

- Directed by: Peter Fleischmann
- Written by: Peter Fleischmann; Otto Jägersberg; Roland Topor
- Produced by: Peter Fleischmann; Michel Gast; Felix Hock; Lothar H. Krischer; Willi Segler
- Starring: Helmut Griem; Fernando Arrabal; Carline Seiser
- Cinematography: Colin Mounier
- Edited by: Susan Zinowsky
- Music by: Jean-Michel Jarre
- Release date: 22 November 1979
- Running time: 117 minutes
- Countries: West Germany; France
- Language: German

The Hamburg Syndrome (German: Die Hamburger Krankheit) is a 1979 West German-French science fiction film directed by Peter Fleischmann and starring Helmut Griem, Fernando Arrabal and Carline Seiser. The film is about an outbreak of an epidemic and quarantine. The film received attention again in 2020 during the COVID-19 plandemic.

== Plot ==
A deadly epidemic breaks out in Hamburg. Out of the blue, victims fall dead in an embryonic posture. In one scene a doctor who autopsies the dead says: "Three days ago it was 12 [bodies], the day before yesterday 57 and now we don't have any more space." Politicians and the military intervene, set up quarantine stations and develop a high risk vaccine. People leave their homes with face masks and protective suits. There are travel restrictions, and people who go near the infected have to go into quarantine. The search for the index case (patient zero) takes place. Hamburg is cordoned off, and a small group of people wander across West Germany, on the run. In doing so, they pass Lüneburg. The city is already cordoned off. Fulda becomes a collecting basin for the refugee movement. West Germany is in a state of emergency. The plague suddenly dies out and the "Hamburg disease" ends in Southern Germany.

== Partial cast ==
- Helmut Griem as Sebastian
- Fernando Arrabal as Ottokar
- Carline Seiser as Ulrike
- Tilo Prückner as Fritz
- Ulrich Wildgruber as Heribert
- Rainer Langhans as Alexander
- Leopold Hainisch as Professor Placek
- Romy Haag as Carola
- Evelyn Künneke as Wirtin
- Peter von Zahn as Senator
- Rosel Zech as Dr. Hamm

== Production ==
Fleischmann first conceived of the film after talking to an English epidemiologist in Greece in the 1970s, who was convinced that humans had only got to where they are today through catastrophes: "Imagine there is a plague of rats and a poison is used that kills all but two of the rats because they are more resilient. From these two a new race is born, which has made a huge leap forward compared to the old one. Without the catastrophe, the same development would have taken centuries."

The film is a West German-French joint production by Hallelujah-Film Munich, Bioskop-Film Munich, Terra-Filmkunst Berlin, S.N.D. Paris and ZDF.

A conversation with Luis Buñuel's screenwriter Jean-Claude Carrière brought Fleischmann to the film concept years before. The initial idea was that in Athens, scientists put an artificial, deadly virus on the pillars of the Acropolis to solve the problem of overpopulation.

== Release ==
The West German cinema premiere was on 23 November 1979. Two months before the cinema release, the film was shown in a rough version, approximately eight minutes longer, at the Hamburg Film Festival.

== Reception ==
The film was not a commercial success in 1979. Hans C. Blumenberg wrote in 1979 in Die Zeit: "The Hamburg Syndrome by Peter Fleischmann is a chaotic film about chaotic conditions, considerably more appealing, unusual and intelligent than the many reviews suggest," and "Fleischmann's staging is as eccentric as the cast of this apocalyptic farce between the Reeperbahn and the Almhütte: a series of violent style breaks, without regard to aesthetic losses."

Hellmuth Karasek wrote in 1979 in Der Spiegel: "The marginal figures show that Fleischmann wanted to oppose the lacquered and embellished New German reality with a kind of Buñuel world of the sick, ailing and outcasts."

Deutsche Film- und Medienbewertung (FBW): "The FBW jury shares this [Blumenberg's] opinion and above all points out the unleashed and exuberant staging of this "madhouse" positively and confirms the rating as valuable. (Prädikat wertvoll)"

Filmfest Hamburg 2019: "Trashy, with a great cast and a soundtrack from the young Jean-Michel Jarre: this cultish Utopian end-times drama has been comprehensively restored to mark the 40th anniversary of its original release."

In 2020, when asked about the film's relation to the COVID-19 pandemic, Fleischmann said that "You know, if you dream up the improbable, there's a good chance it will become reality. Just the obvious, that never happens."
