= Señora Carrar's Rifles =

Play by Bertolt Brecht

Señora Carrar's Rifles (German: Die Gewehre der Frau Carrar) is a one-act play by the twentieth-century German dramatist Bertolt Brecht, written in collaboration with Margarete Steffin. It is a modern version of the Irish dramatist John Millington Synge's play Riders to the Sea (1904). The play's setting is re-located to Spain during the height of the Civil War. Teresa Carrar, the mother, wants to protect her children but ends up fighting on the side of the oppressed.

Brecht wrote the play in 1937, and it received its first theatrical production that same year, opening in Paris on 16 October. This production was directed by Slatan Dudow, with Helene Weigel playing Señora Carrar. The British premiere – and the first production in Britain of a Brecht play – was staged in 1938 by Unity Theatre in London, and then taken on tour as part of a popular "Aid Spain" campaign.

== See also ==
- List of German plays
