= Ulrich Wildgruber =

German actor (1937–1999)

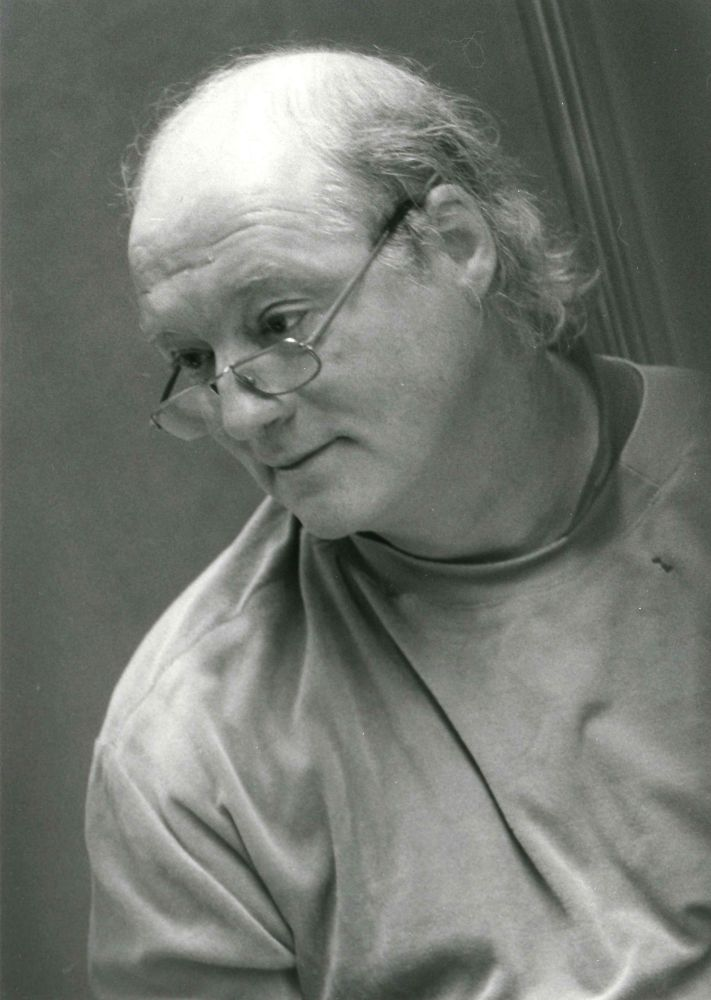
- Portrait of Ulrich Wildgruber
- Born: 18 November 1937; Bielefeld, Germany
- Died: 30 November 1999 (aged 62); Sylt, Germany
- Occupation: Actor
- Years active: 1963–1999

Ulrich Wildgruber (18 November 1937 – 30 November 1999) was a German actor. He started working on stage in 1963 and is best known for playing Othello in the Deutsches Schauspielhaus in Hamburg. He also played in more than fifty films from 1970 to 1999. Wildgruber committed suicide at the age of 62.

== Filmography ==
Year	Title	Role	Notes
1975	Ice Age	Oswald Kronen	
1979	The Hamburg Syndrome	Heribert	
1985	The Death of the White Stallion	Abbot Georg	
1987	Dragon Chow	Udo	
1989	Melancholia	Manfred	
1995	Pakten	Reverend Berger	
1998	The Inheritors	Danninger	

== Awards ==
- 1986 Bundesverdienstkreuz 1. Klasse
