= Wilhelm Dieter Siebert =

German composer (1931–2011)

Wilhelm Dieter Siebert (born 22 October 1931 in Berlin, died 19 April 2011) was a German composer. During his career he has written mainly for television and films, and also chamber music. He composed an opera Der Untergang der Titanic, which was premiered at the Deutsche Oper Berlin in 1979.

== Selected filmography ==
- The Man in Pyjamas (1981)
