= Else Quecke =

German actress (1907–2004)

- Born: 5 September 1907; Duisburg, Germany
- Died: 19 June 2004 (aged 96); Bad Wiessee, Germany
- Occupation: Actress
- Years active: 1955–1996

Else Quecke (5 September 1907 – 19 June 2004) was a German actress. She appeared in more than 100 films and television shows between 1955 and 1996.

== Filmography ==
Year	Title	Role	Notes
1957	The Devil Strikes at Night	Frau Lehmann	
1959	The Domestic Tyrant	Trude Perlacher	
1964	Tales of a Young Scamp	Emilie, Frau Geheimrat	
1966	Liselotte of the Palatinate	Frau von Bienenfeld	
1969	Hunting Scenes from Bavaria	Barbara	
1987	Jokehnen		3 episodes
1988	The Aggression		
1990	The Children		Uncredited
1991	Pizza Colonia	Oma Schmitz	
1993	Hochwürden erbt das Paradies	Sonnenhof Bäuerin	TV film
1996	Hannah	Rose Hochstedt	
