= Die Knapp-Familie =

- Starring: Rosel Zech
- Country of origin: Germany

Die Knapp-Familie is a German television series.

== See also ==
- List of German television series
