= Ralph Giordano =

German writer and publicist (1923–2014)

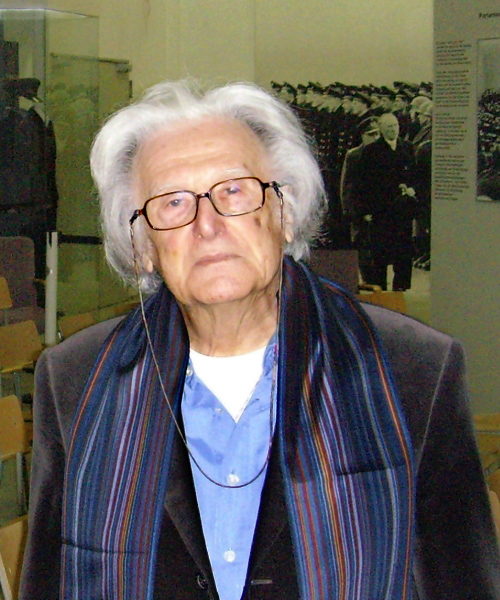
- Giordano in 2008
- Born: 23 March 1923; Hamburg, Germany
- Died: 10 December 2014 (aged 91); Cologne, Germany
- Occupations: Writer; publicist
- Writing career
- Language: German
- Subject: History
- Notable work: Die Bertinis

Ralph Giordano (23 March 1923 – 10 December 2014) was a German writer and publicist.

== Life and career ==
Giordano was born to a Sicilian father and a German Jewish mother in Hamburg. He attended the Gelehrtenschule des Johanneums from 1933 to 1940. Because his mother, a piano teacher, was Jewish, the family was persecuted repeatedly after the Nazis seized power in January 1933. Ultimately, they survived the Holocaust by hiding in a friend's cellar.

After his wartime experiences, Giordano temporarily became a communist. In 1955, he settled in the German Democratic Republic, but soon grew disillusioned because of his dislike of Stalinism and returned to Hamburg (in West Germany). Giordano left the German Communist Party in 1957. In 1961, he published The Party Is Always Right!, a book about his break with communism and the crimes of Josef Stalin.

In 1958, Giordano reported on West German trials of Nazi war criminals for the Central Council of Jews in Germany (Zentralrat der Juden in Deutschland). In 1964, he joined the Cologne-based West German (Public) Broadcasting institution (Westdeutscher Rundfunk — WDR) as a journalist and remained there until 1988.

In 1982, he published his best-known work, Die Bertinis, a semi-autobiographical novel portraying the experiences of a family of mixed ethnic heritage (including Jewish) from the end of the 19th century through the end of World War II. A 1988 television series aired on ZDF was based on the novel.

Thereafter, Giordano worked as a freelance writer and wrote numerous articles about his experiences in Nazi Germany and about the dangers of Neo-Nazi movements. He saw Islam as a threat: In a New York Times interview in 2007, he vehemently opposed the construction of a new mosque in Cologne, calling German mosques "a symbol of a parallel society", and called the integration of German Muslims "a failure".

While working on German television programs, Giordano produced the first TV documentary on the Armenian genocide, The Armenian Question No Longer Exists: The Tragedy of a People, in 1986 for ARD, Germany's public broadcasting service. The documentary relied on long readings from contemporary German diplomatic reports. The film elicited a harsh reaction from Turkey, which denies the genocide, and Giordano received threats. To placate Turkey, ARD director Friedrich Nowottny agreed not to re-broadcast the documentary.

=== Personal life ===
Giordano was married three times. His longtime first wife, Helga, died of cancer in 1984. He and his second wife, Tanja, were divorced in 1988 after one year together. He was married to his third wife, Roswitha Everhan, from 1994 until her death from cancer in 2002. He lived in Cologne. Giordano was a close friend of black German-American journalist Hans Massaquoi since their Swingjugend times in wartime Hamburg.

Giordano died on 10 December 2014, aged 91, of complications following a hip fracture.

The square Piazzetta-Ralph-Giordano in Barmbek-Nord in Hamburg was named after him.
