= Bella Block =

German television series

- Starring: Hannelore Hoger
- Country of origin: Germany
- No. of seasons: 38

Production
- Running time: 90 minutes

Original release
- Network: ZDF
- Release: 26 March 1994 – 24 March 2018

Bella Block is a long-running German detective television series starring Hannelore Hoger as inspector Bella Block, based on books by Doris Gercke. The show was first broadcast in 1994 on ZDF and last aired in 2018, having run for 38 seasons.

== Cast and characters ==
- Hannelore Hoger as Bella Block
- Hansjürgen Hürrig as Klaus Dieter Mehlhorn
- Rudolf Kowalski as Simon Abendroth
- Devid Striesow as Jan Martensen
- Bettina Hauenschild as Anke Ritter
- Pit-Arne Pietz as Hans Teichert
- Peter Heinrich Brix as Pit Cullmann
- Eva Kryll as Bernadette Stein

== See also ==
- List of German television series
