= Hannelore Hoger =

German actress and director (1942–2024)

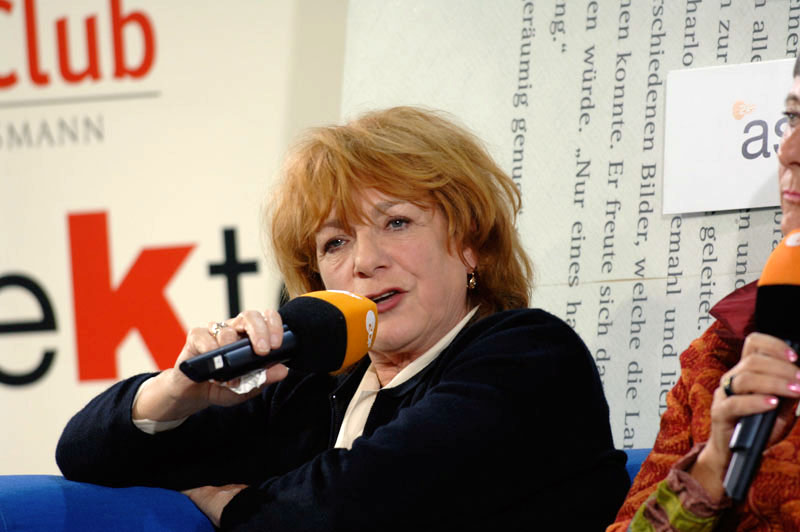
- Hoger in 2005
- Born: 20 August 1939; Hamburg, Germany
- Died: 21 December 2024 (aged 85); Hamburg, Germany
- Education: Hochschule für Musik und Theater Hamburg
- Occupations: Actress, theatre director
- Years active: 1964–2016

Signature
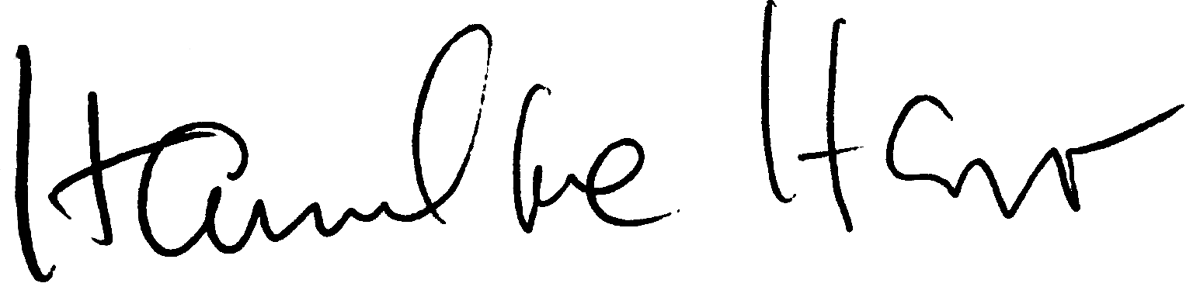

Hannelore Hoger (German: [ˈha.nəˌloː.ʁə ˈhoː.ɡɐ]; 20 August 1939 – 21 December 2024) was a German actress and theatre director. She played the title role in Bella Block.

== Life and career ==
Hoger was born in Hamburg on 20 August 1939. Her father worked as an inspector at the Ohnsorg-Theater in Hamburg. From 1958 to 1961 she studied acting at the Hochschule für Musik und Theater Hamburg. In 1961, her first engagement was at the Theater Ulm. For 25 years, further stations were Bremen, Stuttgart, Cologne, Berlin, Bochum and Hamburg. She has appeared in numerous German films, television-programs, and stage-productions for five decades. She played the title role in the ZDF television series Bella Block. In 1997, she appeared in the satirical film Rossini as gossip reporter. She collaborated with Alexander Kluge and Peter Zadek and worked as audiobook narrator.

Hoger's daughter is the actress Nina Hoger. Hannelore Hoger died in Hamburg on 21 December 2024, at the age of 85.

== Selected filmography ==
=== Film ===
- 1968: Artists Under the Big Top: Perplexed
- 1971: The Big Mess
- 1972: Willi Tobler und der Untergang der 6. Flotte
- 1975: Ice Age
- 1975: The Lost Honour of Katharina Blum
- 1977: Heinrich
- 1978: Germany in Autumn
- 1979: The Patriotic Woman
- 1982: Kraftprobe
- 1983: Strange Fruits
- 1983: The Power of Emotion
- 1984: Thousand Eyes
- 1984: Super
- 1985: The Summer of the Samurai
- 1987: Jacob hinter der blauen Tür
- 1991: Lippels Traum
- 1997: Rossini
- 1999: Straight Shooter
- 1999: Long Hello and Short Goodbye
- 2004: hamlet_X
- 2010: Henri 4
- 2014: Asta Upset
- 2015: Punk Berlin 1982
- 2015: Heidi
- 2020: Lang lebe die Königin

=== Television ===
- 1965: Zeitsperre
- 1965: Tag für Tag – (based on Roots)
- 1966: Wilhelm Tell – (based on William Tell)
- 1969: Marija – (based on Maria)
- 1970: Piggies
- 1970: Der Pott – (based on The Silver Tassie)
- 1971: Eduard IV. – Der Krieg der Rosen, 2. Teil – (based on Henry VI)
- 1972: Der Marquis von Keith
- 1973: Bauern, Bonzen, und Bomben (TV miniseries) (based on A Small Circus)
- 1973: Kleiner Mann, was nun? – (based on Little Man, what now?)
- 1974: Badische Revolte 1848
- 1975: Der Gehülfe
- 1975: Die Geisel – (based on The Hostage)
- 1977: Mensch Mutter
- 1978: Kläger und Beklagte (TV series, 7 episodes)
- 1978: The Day Elvis came to Bremerhaven
- 1979: Die lebenslängliche Frau
- 1979: Eine Rückkehr
- 1979: Tatort: Mitternacht, oder kurz danach
- 1979: Tatort: Schweigegeld
- 1980: Ein Mann für's Leben
- 1983: Der Groß-Cophta
- 1988: Die Bertinis (TV miniseries)
- 1990: Marleneken
- 1991: Tandem
- 1991: Kollege Otto – Die Coop-Affäre
- 1991: Derrick: Ein Tod auf dem Hinterhof
- 1992: Die zweite Heimat (TV miniseries)
- 1992: The Old Fox: Der Tod ist kein Ende
- 1992: Tatort: Unversöhnlich
- 1993: Derrick: Langsamer Walzer
- 1994–2018: Bella Block (TV series, 38 episodes)
- 1994: Derrick: Eine Endstation
- 1994: Heaven and Hell
- 1996–1997: Die Drei (TV series, 27 episodes)
- 1998: Nachspiel
- 2000: Falsche Liebe – Die Internetfalle
- 2001: Vier Meerjungfrauen
- 2002: Weihnachten im September
- 2005: Hölle im Kopf
- 2013: The other Child
- 2013: Uferlos
- 2014: Not for Cowards
- 2016: Hotel Heidelberg (TV series, 5 episodes)

== Writings ==
- Hoger, Hannelore (2017). Ohne Liebe trauern die Sterne: Bilder aus meinem Leben (in German). Reinbek bei Hamburg: Rowohlt. ISBN 978-3-498-03034-6.

== Awards ==
- 1994 Grimme-Preis
- 1996 Bayerischer Fernsehpreis
- 1998 Goldene Kamera
- 2012 Grimme-Preis, life's work
