= Hunting Scenes from Bavaria =

Hunting Scenes from Bavaria Jagdszenen aus Niederbayern
- Film poster
- Directed by: Peter Fleischmann
- Written by: Peter Fleischmann (screenplay); Martin Sperr (play)
- Produced by: Rob Houwer
- Starring: Martin Sperr; Angela Winkler; Else Quecke; Michael Strixner; Hanna Schygulla
- Cinematography: Alain Derobe
- Edited by: Jane Seitz; Barbara Mondry
- Distributed by: Houwer-Film; Film- und Fernsehproduktion Munich
- Release date: 29 May 1969
- Running time: 88 minutes
- Country: West Germany
- Language: German

Hunting Scenes from Bavaria (German: Jagdszenen aus Niederbayern) is a 1969 West German film directed by Peter Fleischmann. It is based on a play of the same name by Martin Sperr, who also played the main role in the film.

It was chosen as West Germany's official submission to the 42nd Academy Awards for Best Foreign Language Film, but did not manage to receive a nomination.

== Plot ==
The film begins with the entire population of the small Bavarian village at church. As the villagers are leaving the service, a bus pulls up with twenty-year-old Abram, who has returned home after serving a prison sentence. He moves back in with his mother, who is a refugee from East Germany, that has never found acceptance from the villagers.

The villagers are quick to start gossiping about Abram, saying the reason he was in jail was because he is gay. Rumors spread that he was seen having sex with an adolescent boy from the village. To make matters worse, Hannelore, who has been accused of being loose, blames Abram for getting her pregnant.

When Abram flees to the forest for peace and quiet, Hannelore follows him, and proceeds to provoke him. In a panic, Abram kills her, and the villagers embark on a manhunt to find and punish him. He is saved from the mob at the last minute when the local police arrive.

== Cast ==
- Martin Sperr
- Angela Winkler
- Else Quecke
- Michael Strixner
- Hanna Schygulla

== Production ==
The film was shot in the small village of Unholzing in Postau near Landshut. Due to the controversial topic of the film, the film crew had to deal with the sometimes hostile reactions of the villagers.

Fleischmann wrote the introduction to the film, titled "On Everyday Fascism":

I would be sorry if anyone were to interpret my film in a fatalistic way. In the past, people fought against the plague. Today, they have to fight another enemy, neurosis, and one of its most frequent forms, aggressiveness. The whole world is sick and needs to be cured. Germany has been especially ill. The nazis put the blame for everything on a few; the Germans blamed only the nazis, and the world blamed only the bad Germans. Everyone accuses a minority and no one will see that a whole people was sick and look for the cause. Who helps to cure these complexes? Who sees the imbalance that plagues our country and its incapacity to relax, the fear of chaos within us that takes the form of a relentless quest for order?

== Reception ==
French author Guy Hocquenghem wrote that the film "gives a good account of the consequences of the paranoiac interpretative delusions of the village towards Abram on whom the entire population's homosexual libido is focused; in the hunt sequence which ends the film, the representative of that desire is cut off from all ties with the community." Hungarian film director András Kovács wrote that the film is an example of New German Cinema, with its "overt and sharp social criticism," that is on display throughout the film.

Jerry Stille from Take One called it "a revealing exploration into the dark roots of human nature—prejudice, intolerance and aggression; it is all about survival and the fight for normality." Film critic Stanley Eichelbaum opined that "the picture is remarkably graphic and honest; it was done for the most part with non-actors, who must not have realized how self-incriminating the earthy enactment of their everyday lives would be."

English film critic David Robinson wrote the film "is a brutal allegorical tale of intolerance and persecution." He goes on to say that when the village boy returns home, the villagers "are undecided whether to condemn him as a seducer or a homosexual, but settle to persecute him on both counts, driving him to despair." Author Dominique Chansel opined that Fleischmann's idea was "to study a specific example of mounting aggressiveness and intolerance, the mechanisms that lead to someone different being excluded; he shows us how a community of human beings can construct fascism in its everyday life."

English filmmaker Chris Petit observed that "between the seemingly idyllic opening and closing scenes depicting a rural community, first at church, then at the village festival, Fleischmann attacks that community's prejudices and ignorance without remorse; an impressive film." In her review for the Concord Transcript, Dora Friedrich wrote, "don't expect to be entertained; entertaining the movie is not; it is an incisive film about ignorance, intolerance, hostility, anger and bitterness; yet at the same time it is poignant and worthwhile; if you can face reality about man's inhumanity to man, then you should experience this movie."

== Awards ==
- German Film Award: Best Supporting Actor (Michael Strixner)
- German Film Award: Best Feature Film
- Prix Georges-Sadoul
- Preis der deutschen Filmkritik: Best German Contemporary Film and Best German Debut Film
- Jury der Evangelischen Filmarbeit: Film of the Month

== See also ==
- Cinema of Germany
- List of submissions to the 42nd Academy Awards for Best Foreign Language Film
- List of German submissions for the Academy Award for Best Foreign Language Film
- List of LGBTQ-related films of 1969
