= Peter Zadek =

German director (1926–2009)

- Born: 19 May 1926; Berlin, Germany
- Died: 30 July 2009 (aged 83); Hamburg, Germany
- Spouse: Brigitta Blumenthal

Peter Zadek (German: [ˈtsaːdɛk]; 19 May 1926 – 30 July 2009) was a German director of theatre, opera and film, a translator and a screenwriter. He is regarded as one of the greatest directors in German-speaking theater.

== Biography ==
Peter Zadek was born on 19 May 1926 to a Jewish family in Berlin. In 1934, he emigrated with his family to London where he later studied at Old Vic theatre, after a year at Oxford University. He began in weekly rep in Swansea and Pontypridd. He studied at the Old Vic, and his first productions included Oscar Wilde’s Salome and T. S. Eliot’s Sweeney Agonistes. Zadek caused a stir in London in the late 1950s with his productions of works by Jean Genet. Indeed, Genet was so outraged by Zadek's world première of The Balcony at the Arts in 1957 that he apparently bought a gun with the intention of shooting its director. He also worked as a director for the BBC in this period.

=== Bremen years ===
Returning to Germany in 1958, Zadek worked in Theater Bremen from 1962 to 1968. In 1969, he directed the film I'm an Elephant, Madame. It was entered into the 19th Berlin International Film Festival, where it won a Silver Bear award.

=== Shakespeare as passion ===
Zadek and his partner, Elisabeth Plessen, translated many of Shakespeare’s works into German for the stage, along with plays by Pinter, Chekhov, and others. Zadek became renowned for his productions of Shakespeare and played a key role in sparking greater interest in English drama among German audiences. Within just three years of his arrival in Germany, Zadek had firmly established himself in the German theater scene. He directed 14 productions during that time—and another four in the following six months. As one German critic and expert in theater history put it: “Zadek was in a rush of making” (im Rausch des Machens). His bold theatrical vision, or Theatermut (“theater-courage”), rejected a purely literary Shakespeare in favour of exploring the absurd and grotesque aspects of the plays. Zadek’s acclaimed 1988 staging of Der Kaufmann von Venedig (The Merchant of Venice) at the Burgtheater, for example, cleverly and seamlessly relocated the story—from its original focus on a ruined merchant and a deadly bond made to secure a loan—into the context of modern everyday life.

=== Illness and death ===
Despite suffering from an illness, Zadek continued working in his later years. In 2008, he staged Pirandello's Naked at the St. Pauli Theater in Hamburg. Zadek's last production was Shaw's Major Barbara, performed at the Schauspielhaus Zurich in February 2009. He died on 30 July 2009 in Hamburg, survived by his two children.

== Head of theatres ==
He headed up such major German theatres as the Schauspiel Bochum, where he shaped the Zadek-Era. from 1972 to 1979. Here he paved the career of performers, Herbert Grönemeyer, today one of the most popular singer-songwriters who was then his musical director in 1976 and also an actor in roles, such as Melchior in Wedekind's Frühlings Erwachen, and secondly Natias Neutert, who performed his One-Mensch-Theater.

In 1984, Zadek worked at the Freie Volksbühne Berlin and got a great success with Josua Sobol’s playwright Ghetto with his discovery of the actor Ulrich Tukur (who later became staff actor within the ensemble of Deutsches Schauspielhaus) 1985–1989 at Deutsches Schauspielhaus, Hamburg. From 1992 to 1996 Zadek was appointed as one head among others at the Berliner Ensemble, the theater founded by Bertolt Brecht. After German reunification the Senate of Berlin appointed a "collective" of five stage directors to serve as Intendanten (General Administrators): Peter Zadek, Peter Palitzsch (1918–2004), Heiner Müller, Fritz Marquardt and Matthias Langhoff. In this former East German theater Zadek was a director who represented the West. Indeed, he brought with him an international team that formed a "Western invasion" which revived the Berliner Ensemble. In addition to bringing great actors such as Gert Voss and Eva Mattes, Zadek brought in young protégé stage directors such as British director Rosee Riggs and also appointed renowned American Berlin-based conductor Alexander Frey as music director of the theater. Frey was the first American to hold any position at the Berliner Ensemble, as well as being the theatre's first non-German music director; his historic predecessors include the composers Kurt Weill, Hanns Eisler, and Paul Dessau —all of them worked under Brecht.

== Opera director ==
Zadek directed his first opera, Mozart's The Marriage of Figaro, in 1983. He also directed Kurt Weill's Aufstieg und Fall der Stadt Mahagonny at the Salzburg Festival in 1998. He wrote the libretto for the children's opera Timothy by Peter Ury, based on the story 'Heinzelmeier' by Theodor Storm.

== Acting ==
Zadek acted in a small role in Rainer Werner Fassbinder's film Die Sehnsucht der Veronika Voss (Veronika Voss, 1982).

== Awards ==
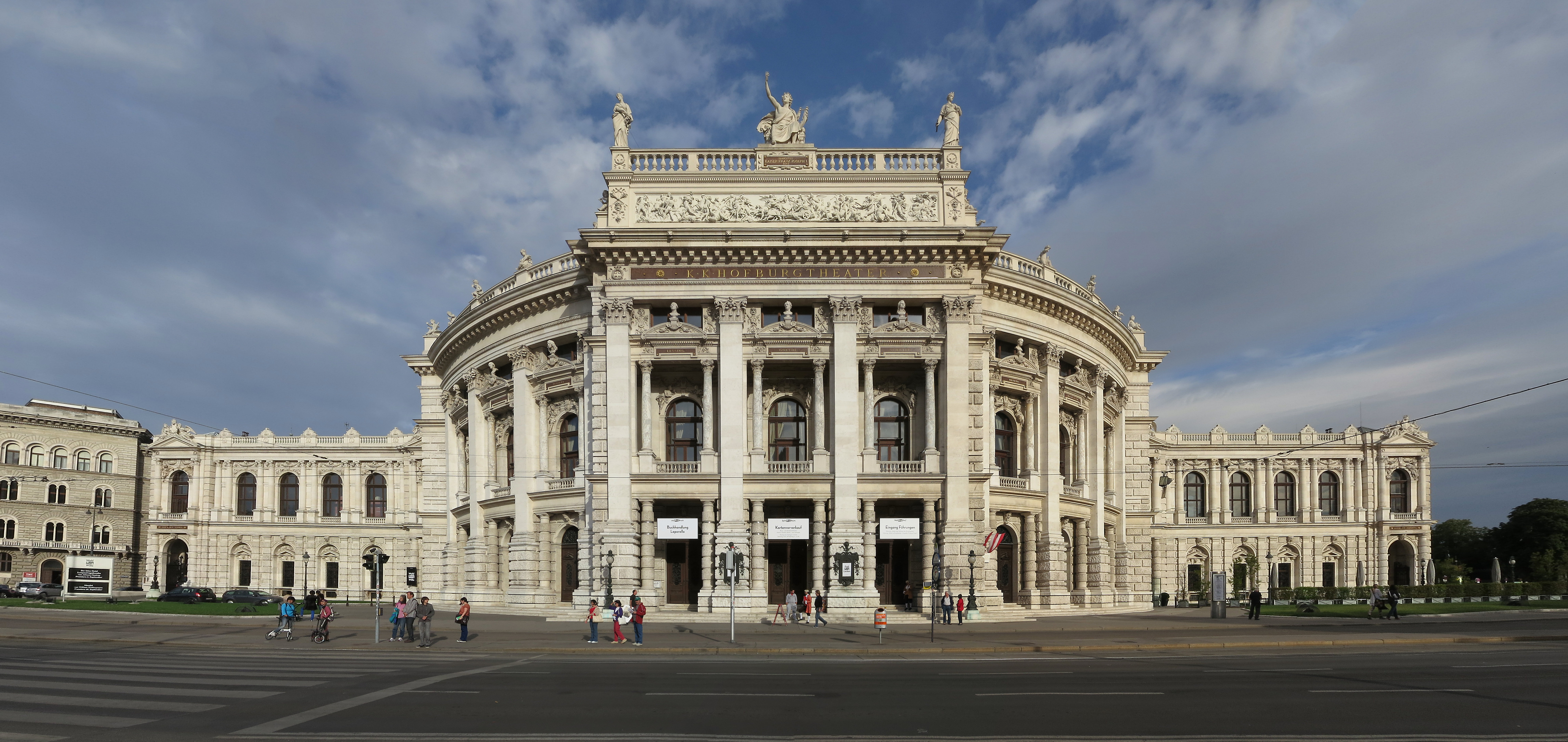
Burgtheater, Vienna, locus of his acclaimed The Merchant of Venice

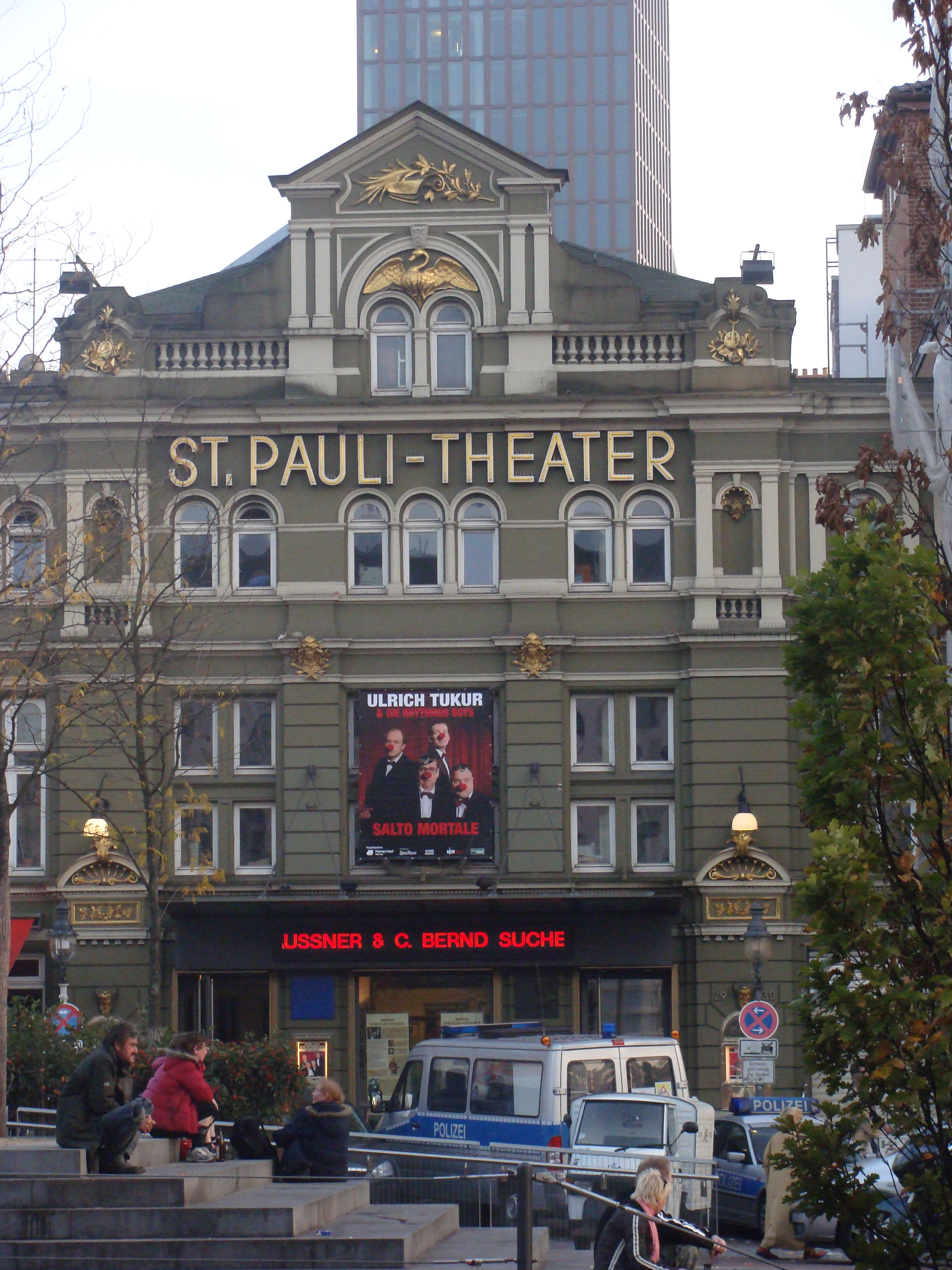
St. Pauli Theater Hamburg

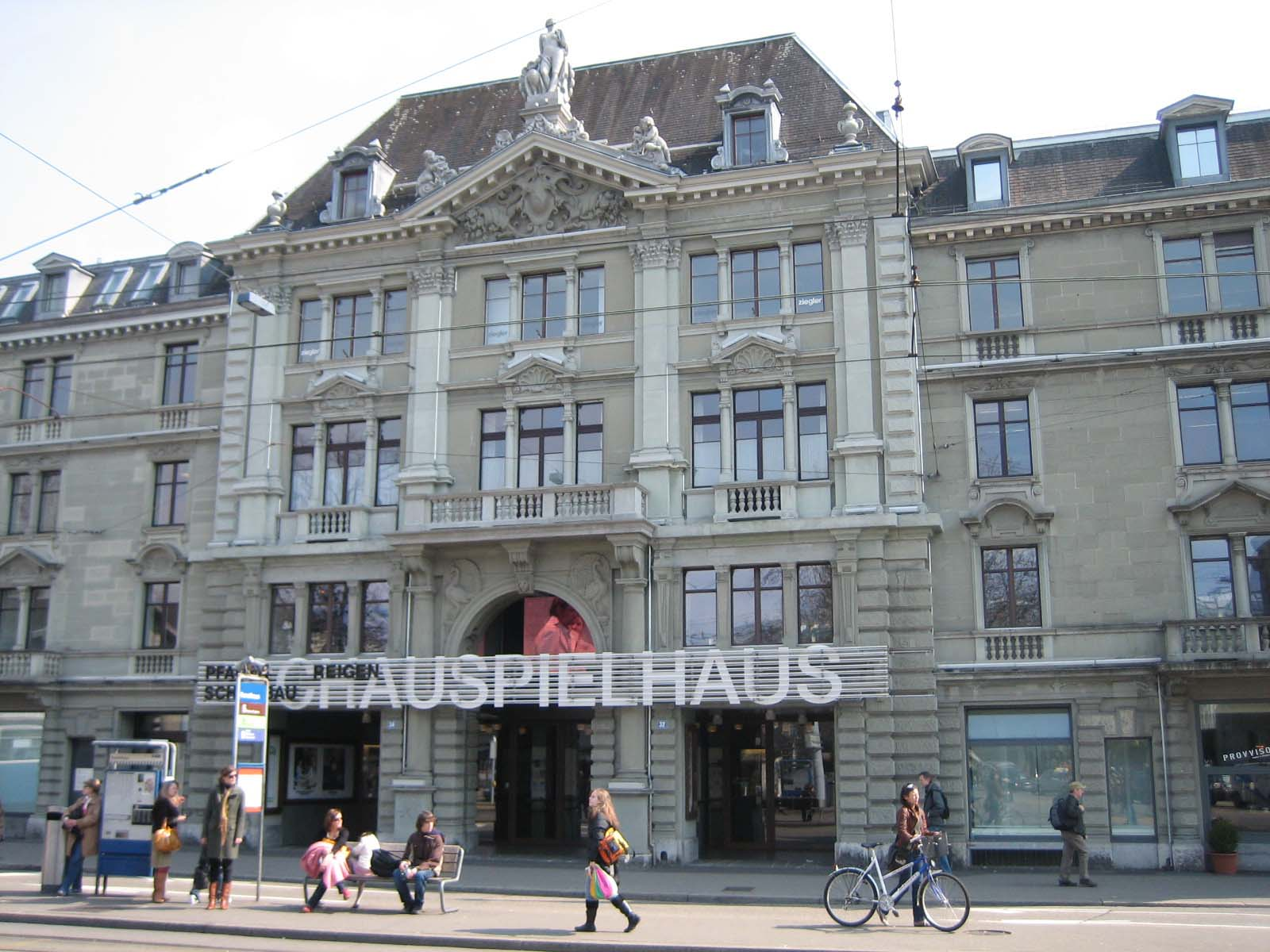
Schauspielhaus Zurich

Besides being chosen as "Director of the year" numerous times by the Theater heute magazine, he received the following awards:

- 1969 Silver Bear for the film I'm an Elephant, Madame at the 19th Berlin International Film Festival
- 1988 Kortner Award
- 1989 Piscator Award and Kainz Award
- 1991 Member of the German Academy of the Arts
- 1992 Commandeur des Arts et des Lettres
- 1994 Critics' Prize of the Edinburgh International Festival (for his direction of Anthony and Cleopatra which combined World War I England and ancient Egypt)
- 2001 Nestroy Theatre Prize (Best director)
- 2002 German Federal Cross of Merit
- 2007 Europe Theatre Prize
- 2008 Nestroy Theatre Prize (Lifetime achievement)

== Europe Theatre Prize ==
In 2007, he was awarded the XI Europe Theatre Prize, in Thessaloniki. The prize organization stated:

In giving the award to Peter Zadek, we wanted to salute the work of an artist who, in a long career beginning in England and continuing for more than forty years in Germany, has reinvented the art of the theatre director by working at the same time both directly on the text with his chosen actors, and in pursuit of a ‘conceptual’ method of directing. Thus he has found, and continues to find, his personal vision and create with it a lively impact in each production, while retaining the principles of his ‘guiding spirits’, Shakespeare, Ibsen and Chekhov.

== Legacy ==
Following Zadek's death, British critic Michael Billington wrote in The Guardian:

"Zadek was mercurial, intuitive, even populist in his approach – and the results were sometimes astonishing. Four of his shows came to the Edinburgh International festival and he always made you re-assess a play. I recall a modern-dress Merchant of Venice in which Gert Voss's assimilated Shylock, even after his humiliation in the trial scene, coolly strolled off stage as if preparing to phone his broker. In 2004, Zadek also brought us a brilliantly witty, ironic Peer Gynt: one that suggested Ibsen anticipated Strindbergian dream-drama, Brechtian expressionism, the madhouse world of the Marat/Sade and even modern physical theatre."

Billington also wrote in the same article:

"Although Zadek made his name in Germany, he never forgot his British roots. When I went to see his Berlin production of Pinter's Moonlight, he told me that he loved Pinter's work because of its origins in weekly rep and because, as he said, "it was like a combination of Agatha Christie and Kafka". But Zadek also understood Pinter's play profoundly: rarely have I seen Pinter's idea that women possess an emotional awareness denied to men so vividly expressed."

In 1999 in Vienna, when he directed Hamlet with a woman in the title role, the Austrian newspaper Wiener Zeitung criticized him having too much of a "children belief in justice" (Kinderglaube an Gerechtigkeit).

In 2015, the city of Bochum designated a newly built street close to the Schauspielhaus Bochum as Peter-Zadek-Straße.

== Filmography ==
- Die Kurve (TV play, 1961, based on a play by Tankred Dorst)
- Die Mondvögel (TV play, 1963, based on the play Les oiseaux de lune by Marcel Aymé)
- I'm an Elephant, Madame (1969, based on the novel Die Unberatenen by Thomas Valentin)
- Rotmord (TV play, 1969, based on the play Toller by Tankred Dorst)
- Der Pott (TV play, 1971, based on the play The Silver Tassie by Seán O'Casey)
- Ice Age (1975, based on a play by Tankred Dorst)
- The Roaring Fifties (1983, based on the novel Hurra, wir leben noch by Johannes Mario Simmel)
