= Tankred Dorst =

German playwright and storyteller (1925–2017)

- Born: 19 December 1925; Oberlind, Germany
- Died: 1 June 2017 (aged 91); Berlin
- Occupations: Playwright, storyteller
- Awards: Georg Büchner Prize

Tankred Dorst (19 December 1925 – 1 June 2017) was a German playwright and storyteller.

Dorst lived and worked in Munich. His farces, parables, one-act-plays and adaptations were inspired by the theatre of the absurd and the works of Ionesco, Giraudoux and Beckett. His monumental drama Merlin oder das wüste Land, which was premiered in 1981 in Düsseldorf, has been compared to Goethe's Faust. Some critics see it as the first major drama of the 1980s. In his tribute to Tankred Dorst on the occasion of the conferment of the Georg Büchner Prize in 1990, Georg Hensel remarked that Dorst's plays all have a direct connection to the present: "For 30 years Dorst's plays have responded to the great transformations. He has always been a companion to the times."

Dorst first directed the Ring of the Nibelung in Bayreuth in 2006.

== Biography ==
Tankred Dorst was born in Oberlind in Thuringia, Germany.

Conscripted into the German army as a pupil at the age of 17, he was soon captured and incarcerated as a prisoner of war. Until 1947 he remained in British and American hands. By the time he was released from war captivity, his birthplace had become part of the Soviet sector of Germany. He met his family in West Germany and completed his schooling. In 1950 he began studying German literature, art history and theatre in Bamberg and Munich. Through the 1950s he wrote his first plays for the marionette theatre Das Kleine Spiel, (some together with composer Wilhelm Killmayer). After breaking off his studies, he worked in various capacities in theatre, film, radio and publishing houses.

His first major plays were performed in 1960 in Lübeck, Mannheim and Heidelberg. Since then, his plays have been performed in the whole world. Dorst's work has been recognized with many prizes and distinctions, including the Gerhart Hauptmann Prize (1964), Prize of the City of Florence (1970), Literature Prize of the Bayerische Akademie der Künste (1983), Mülheimer Dramatikerpreis (1989), Georg Büchner Prize (1990), E.T.A. Hoffmann Prize (1996) and the city of Zürich's Max Frisch Prize (1998). In 2006, he was awarded the Samuel Bogumil Linde Prize. He was awarded the European Prize for Literature (2008). Dorst held visiting professorships at universities in Germany, Australia and New Zealand.

Dorst died on 1 June 2017 in Berlin.

== Major works ==
- Die Kurve (1960)
- Toller (1968)
- Rotmord (1969, television film adaptation of Toller produced in collaboration with Peter Zadek)
- Sand (1971, television film directed by Peter Palitzsch)
- Eiszeit (1973)
- Die Villa (1976)
- Klaras Mutter (1978, television film )
- Mosch (1980, television film adaptation)
- Merlin oder das wüste Land (1981)
- Strange Fruits (1982, movie adaptation)
- Parzival (1987)
- Ich Feuerbach (1987)
- Korbes (1988)
- Karlos (1990)
- Herr Paul (1994)
- Die Legende vom armen Heinrich (1997)
- Kupsch (2001, monologue)
- Die Freude am Leben (2001)
- Othoon (2002)
