= Peter Fleischmann =

German film director (1937–2021)

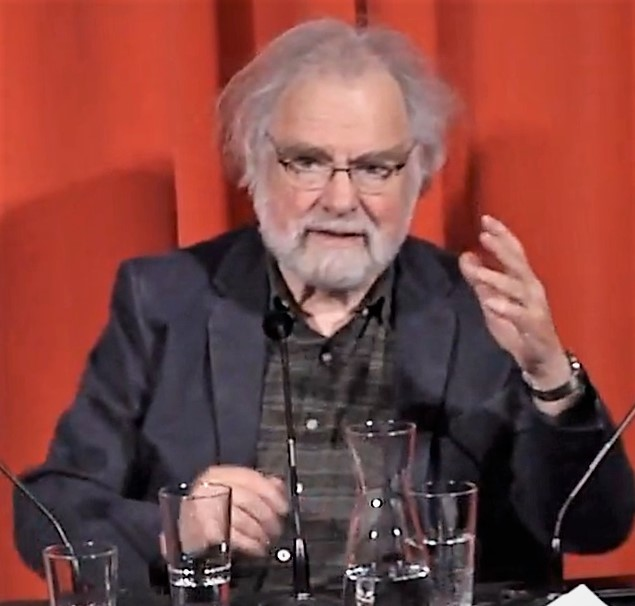
- Peter Fleischmann at Deutsches Filminstitut in 2018
- Born: 26 July 1937; Zweibrücken, Bavaria, Germany
- Died: 11 August 2021 (aged 84); Potsdam, Brandenburg, Germany
- Occupations: Film director; Screenwriter; Film producer
- Awards: Deutscher Filmpreis

Peter Fleischmann (26 July 1937 – 11 August 2021) was a German film director, screenwriter and producer. He worked also as an actor, cutter, sound engineer, interviewer and speaker. Fleischmann belonged to the New German Cinema of the 1960s and 1970s. He is known for directing the 1969 Jagdszenen aus Niederbayern (Hunting Scenes from Bavaria), but he produced films of many genres.

== Life and career ==
Peter Fleischmann was born in Zweibrücken. He studied at the Deutsches Institut für Film und Fernsehen (German Institute of Film and Television, DIFF) in Munich and Institut des hautes études cinématographiques (IDHEC) in Paris. He had contact with representatives of the French Nouvelle Vague movement, and became a friend of Jean-Claude Carrière, with whom he later wrote screenplays. After years as an assistant director, he became a director in 1963 in short films and children's films. In 1967, he directed a documentary, Herbst der Gammler, about the Gammler subculture, which anticipated the gereration conflicts of the 1968 student movement.

His first full-length film was released in 1969, Jagdszenen aus Niederbayern, based on the play of the same name by Martin Sperr, who also played the leading role. The film reflects critically how a Bavarian village deals with outsiders, especially the homosexual character played by Sperr. The film was awarded prizes, including the Filmband in Silber of Deutscher Filmpreis. It was suggested for a nomination as the Oscars' best foreign film but was not nominated. The film made Fleischmann a representative of the New German Cinema of the 1960s and 1970s. The same year, Fleischmann and Volker Schlöndorff founded the film production company Hallelujah-Film.

In Fleischmann's later works, often the seemingly villainous character would turn out to be a good person. In Das Unheil (Havoc), with a script by Fleischmann and Martin Walser, he criticised in 1972 the provincial attitude of a Hessian small town and pollution of the environment. The film was awarded the Prix Luis Buñuel of the Cannes Festival. In Dorotheas Rache (1974), he created a provocative satire on the sexfilm wave. His 1979 film The Hamburg Syndrome (Die Hamburger Krankheit) about an unknown infectious plague in German, with actor Helmut Griem, received attention again in 2020 during the COVID-19 pandemic.

Fleischmann's films were often critically acclaimed, but not successful at the box office, which reduced the potential for projects in the 1980s. Schlöndorff described him as a Renaissance person, comparable to Orson Welles, who had visions but was reduced to early works. In 1990, he created Es ist nicht leicht ein Gott zu sein (Hard to Be a God), an elaborate film after a science-fiction novel by Arkady and Boris Strugatsky. Faithful to his early documentaries, he produced Deutschland, Deutschland from interviews with simple passers-by in Germany's East and West about Die Wende, indicating future difficulties after Germany's reunification. In 2006, he produced Mein Freund, der Mörder (My Friend the Murderer), a documentary about his friend Bernhard Kimmel whom he had portrayed before in the 1987 Der Al Capone der Pfalz. He published a novel in 2008, Die Zukunftsangst der Deutschen, about the Germans' fear of the future. He was active with the restoration of several of his films.

In the 1990s, Fleischmann was on the board of the Babelsberg Studios of the former UFA and DEFA, and was instrumental in the rescue of the studios, finding investors from European countries. He was a founding member of the Deutsche Filmakademie in 2003. His last residence was in Werder near Potsdam, where he died at age 84 after a bad fall.

=== Awards ===
- 1966 – Special Prize for Educative and Didactic Film for Children of the Venice Film Festival for Alexander and a Car without the Left Headlight
- 1969 – Filmband in Silber for Jagdszenen aus Niederbayern
- 1972 – Prix Luis Buñuel of the Cannes Festival
- 1991 – Kurd Laßwitz Award in the category Best Film (Movie) for Es ist nicht leicht, ein Gott zu sein

== Films ==
Fleischmann was active as actor, director, script writer and producer, among others.

=== Director ===
Films directed by Fleischmann include:

- 1957: Die Eintagsfliege (The Mayfly), short film
- 1961: Geschichte einer Sandrose (Story of a Sand Rose), short documentary, also script
- 1962: Brot der Wüste (Bread of the Desert), short film
- 1963: Begegnung mit Fritz Lang (A Meeting with Fritz Lang), short documentary
- 1964: Der Test (The Test), short film
- 1965: Alexander und das Auto ohne linken Scheinwerfer (Alexander and the Car with the missing Headlight), short film, also producer
- 1967: Herbst der Gammler, documentary
- 1969: Jagdszenen aus Niederbayern (Hunting Scenes from Bavaria), based on Martin Sperr's 1965 play Jagdszenen aus Niederbayern, also script
- 1972: Das Unheil (Havoc), screenplay with Martin Walser, also producer
- 1973: Dorotheas Rache (Dorothea's Revenge), screenplay with Jean-Claude Carrière, also producer
- 1975: Weak Spot, screenplay with Jean-Claude Carrière and Martin Walser, based on Antonis Samarakis' 1965 novel To Lathos, also co-producer
- 1979: Die Hamburger Krankheit (The Hamburg Syndrome), screenplay with Roland Topor and Otto Jägersberg, also producer
- 1983: Frevel (Sacrilege or Mischief), screenplay with Jacques Rozier, also actor, cutter, producer
- 1987: Der Al Capone von der Pfalz, documentary, also actor, script, commentary, interviews, sound, producer
- 1989: Hard to Be a God, screenplay with Jean-Claude Carrière, based on Arkady and Boris Strugatsky's 1964 novel Hard to Be a God, also producer
- 1991: Deutschland, Deutschland (Germany, Germany), documentary, also actor, script, interviews, producer
- 1993: Mein Onkel der Winzer, TV documentary, also speaker, script, interviews, producer
- 2006: Mein Freund der Mörder (My Friend the Murderer), documentary, also speaker, script, interviews, producer

=== Screenwriter ===
- 1986: Les Exploits d'un jeune Don Juan, directed by Gianfranco Mingozzi, screenplay with Jean-Claude Carrière — based on Guillaume Apollinaire's 1911 novel
