= Jagdszenen aus Niederbayern (play) =

1965 German play

- Original language: German
- Written by: Martin Sperr
- Setting: Reinöd, Lower Bavaria

Premiere
- Date: 27 May 1966
- Place: Theater Bremen in Bremen

Jagdszenen aus Niederbayern (English: Hunting Scenes From Lower Bavaria) is a 1965 German play by Martin Sperr. The play was adapted into a film of the same name in 1969.

== See also ==
- Hunting Scenes from Bavaria
