= Jost Vacano =

German cinematographer

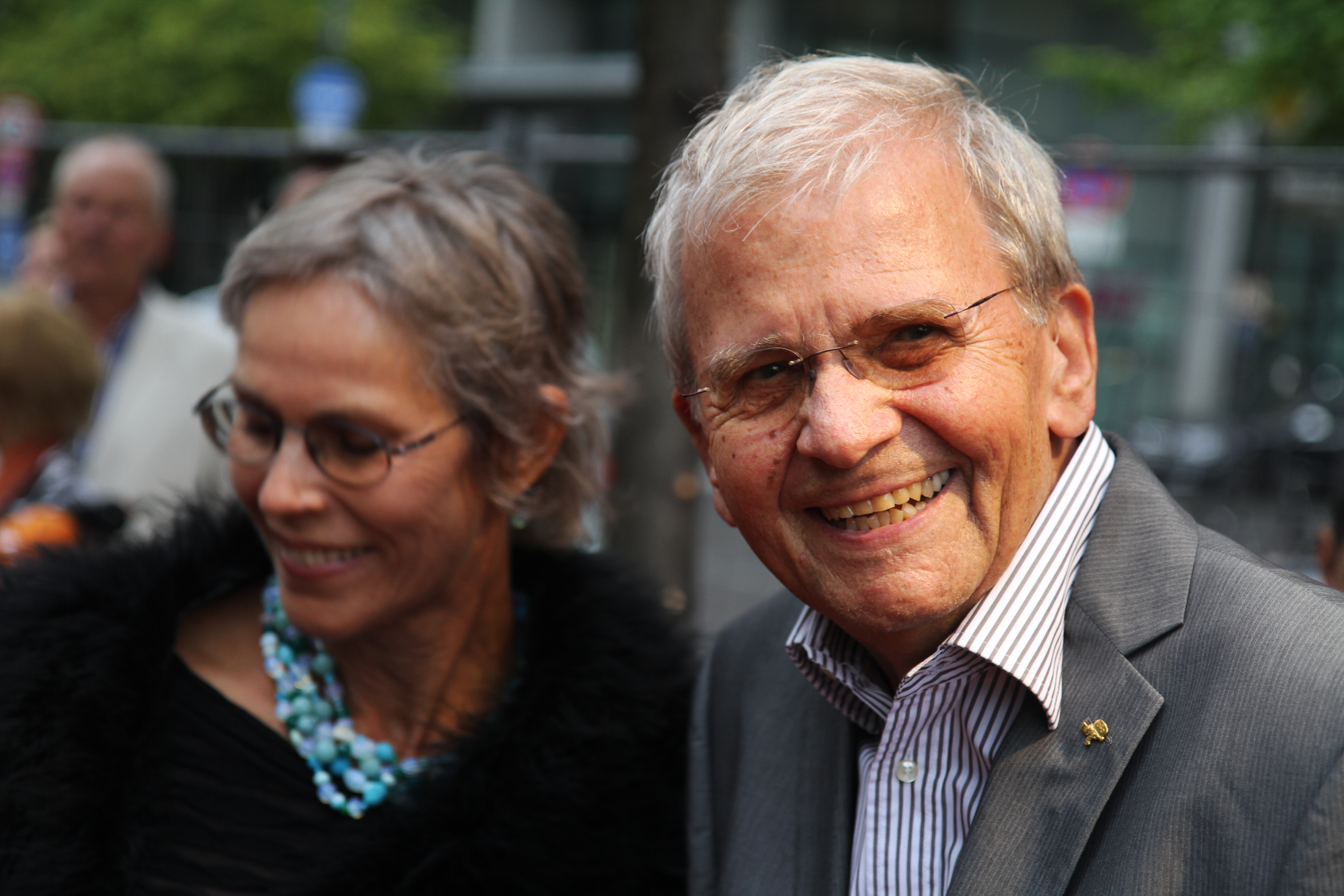
- Jost Vacano and his wife Dagmar (2011)
- Born: 15 March 1934 (age 92); Osnabrück, German Reich
- Occupation: Cinematographer
- Years active: 1962–2000

Jost Vacano, BVK (born 15 March 1934) is a German retired cinematographer. His work included Das Boot, and he also worked together with director Paul Verhoeven on seven films, including RoboCop and Total Recall. He was also the cinematographer for The Lost Honor of Katharina Blum which he considers his favorite of his own films due to its timeless political message.

== Awards ==
- 1981 Bavarian Film Award, Best Cinematography

== Filmography ==
=== Feature films ===
Year	Title	Director	Notes
1966	No Shooting Time for Foxes	Peter Schamoni	
1970	Butterflies Don't Cry	Klaus Überall	
1974	Supermarket	Roland Klick	
1974	Der Abituriententag	Eberhard Itzenplitz	
1975	The Lost Honor of Katharina Blum	Volker Schlöndorff; Margarethe von Trotta	
1976	Dear Fatherland Be at Peace	Roland Klick	
1976	Potato Fritz	Peter Schamoni	
1977	The Brothers	Wolf Gremm	
1977	Death or Freedom	Wolf Gremm	
1977	Soldier of Orange	Paul Verhoeven	
1978	The Fifth Commandment	Duccio Tessari	
1980	Spetters	Paul Verhoeven	
1981	Das Boot	Wolfgang Petersen	Bavarian Film Award for Best Cinematography; Nominated - Academy Award for Best Cinematography
1983	The Roaring Fifties	Peter Zadek	
1984	The NeverEnding Story	Wolfgang Petersen	
1986	52 Pick-Up	John Frankenheimer	
1987	RoboCop	Paul Verhoeven	additional cinematographers James Glennon and Sol Negrin
1988	Rocket Gibraltar	Daniel Petrie	
1990	Total Recall	Paul Verhoeven	
1993	Untamed Heart	Tony Bill	
1995	Showgirls	Paul Verhoeven	
1997	Starship Troopers	Paul Verhoeven	
2000	Hollow Man	Paul Verhoeven	

=== Television ===
TV movies

- Die Stühle (1964)
- Mariana Pineda (1965)
- Der Nebbich (1965)
- Mord in Frankfurt (1968)
- Ostern (1968)
- The Accident (1968)
- The Age of the Fish (1969)
- The German Lesson (1971)
- Shot on Command – The Sass Brothers, Once Berlin's Big Crooks (1972)
- 21 Hours at Munich (1976)

TV series

- Tatort: Kressin und der tote Mann im Fleet (1971)
- Tales from the Crypt (1990) (Episode "The Switch")

== See also ==
- List of German-speaking Academy Award winners and nominees
