= Festung =

Festung is the German word for fortress. Although it is not in common usage in English, it is used in contexts related to Central European, especially German, history. The term is used:

- In the names of fortresses in German speaking Europe
- For fortified areas in Switzerland's National Redoubt
- In German World War Two propaganda for:
  - Festung Europa — The defensive buildup of Western Europe against the Allies
    - Vital locations along the Atlantic wall, including the entirety of Norway
  - For key strategic locations which were to be held at all costs, especially towards the end of the war
    - Festung Stalingrad following the city's encirclement in Operation Uranus
    - Festung Warschau — used in different contexts in 1939 and 1944
    - Festung Posen
    - Festung Kolberg
    - Festung Breslau
    - Festung Budapest
    - Festung Königsberg
    - Alpenfestung — the planned national redoubt
  - For proposed post war German exclaves in key places such as Brest and Trondheim

== See also ==
- Die Festung, novel by Lothar-Günther Buchheim
