= Das Boot =

1981 West German war film

- Original German theatrical poster
- Directed by: Wolfgang Petersen
- Screenplay by: Wolfgang Petersen
- Based on: Das Boot by Lothar-Günther Buchheim
- Produced by: Günter Rohrbach
- Starring: Jürgen Prochnow; Herbert Grönemeyer; Klaus Wennemann
- Cinematography: Jost Vacano
- Edited by: Hannes Nikel
- Music by: Klaus Doldinger
- Production companies: Bavaria Film; Radiant Film; Westdeutscher Rundfunk; SWR Fernsehen
- Distributed by: Neue Constantin Film
- Release date: 17 September 1981
- Running time: 149 minutes (see below)
- Country: West Germany
- Language: German
- Budget: DM 32 million (equivalent to €17.4 million 2021)
- Box office: $84.9 million (equivalent to $283 million 2025)

The conning tower of the submarine, at Bavaria Studios, Munich

Das Boot (German pronunciation: [das ˈboːt]; lit. 'The Boat') is a 1981 West German war film written and directed by Wolfgang Petersen, produced by Günter Rohrbach, and starring Jürgen Prochnow, Herbert Grönemeyer and Klaus Wennemann. An adaptation of Lothar-Günther Buchheim's 1973 semi-autobiographical novel of the same name, the film is set during World War II and follows the German submarine U-96 and her crew, as they set out on a hazardous patrol in the Battle of the Atlantic. It depicts both the excitement of battle and the tedium of the fruitless hunt, and shows the men serving aboard U-boats as ordinary individuals with a desire to do their best for their comrades and their country.

Development began in 1979. Several American directors were considered three years earlier, before the film was shelved. During production, Heinrich Lehmann-Willenbrock, the captain of the real U-96 during Buchheim's 1941 patrol and one of Germany's top U-boat "tonnage aces" during the war, and Hans-Joachim Krug, former first officer on U-219, served as consultants. One of Petersen's goals was to guide the audience through "a journey to the edge of the mind" (the film's German tagline Eine Reise ans Ende des Verstandes), showing "what war is all about".

Produced on a DM32 million budget (about $13 million, equivalent to €17.4 million in 2021), the high production cost ranks it among the most expensive films in German cinema, but it was a commercial success, grossing nearly $85 million worldwide (equivalent to $283 million 2025). The film has been exhibited both as a theatrical release (1981) and a TV miniseries (1985). Several different home video versions, as well as a director's cut (1997) supervised by Petersen, have also been released. Columbia Pictures issued both German-language and English-dubbed versions in the United States theatrically through their Triumph Classics label, earning $11 million.

Das Boot received positive reviews, and was nominated for six Academy Awards, including for Best Director and Best Adapted Screenplay for Petersen himself. He was also nominated for a BAFTA Award and DGA Award, and the film won the German Film Award for Best Film. It was the German film with the most Oscar nominations until the release of All Quiet on the Western Front in 2022.

== Plot ==
Lieutenant Werner, a war correspondent on the German submarine U-96 in October 1941, is driven by his captain and chief engineer to a French bordello, where he meets some of the crew. Thomsen, another captain, gives a drunken speech to celebrate his Ritterkreuz award and mocks Adolf Hitler.

The next morning, U-96 sails out of the harbour of La Rochelle, and Werner is given a tour of the boat. He observes ideological differences between the new crew members and the hardened veterans, particularly the captain, who is cynical about the war. The new men, including Werner, are mocked by the rest, who share a tight bond. The first watch officer is particularly disliked due to his pro-Nazi beliefs and meticulous grooming habits, which tie up the only bathroom. After days of boredom, the crew is excited by another U-boat's spotting of an enemy convoy, but they are soon spotted by a British destroyer and attacked with depth charges. They escape with light damage.

The next three weeks are spent enduring relentless North Atlantic gales. Morale drops after various misfortunes, but the crew is cheered by a chance encounter with Thomsen's boat. After the storm ends, the boat encounters an Allied convoy and launches four torpedoes, sinking two ships. The convoy's escorts counterattack, and they are forced to dive below test depth, the submarine's rated limit. As depth charges explode around them, the chief machinist, Johann, has a panic attack and has to be restrained. The boat sustains heavy damage but manages to surface when night falls. A British tanker they torpedoed is still afloat and on fire, so they torpedo it again, only to learn that sailors are still aboard. The crew watches as the sailors leap overboard and swim towards them. Neither able nor willing to accommodate prisoners, the captain orders the boat to back away.

The exhausted crew looks forward to returning home to La Rochelle for Christmas, but the boat is ordered to La Spezia, Italy, which means passing through the Strait of Gibraltar—an area defended by the Royal Navy. The U-boat makes a secret night rendezvous at the harbour of Vigo, in neutral but Axis-friendly Spain, with the SS Weser, an interned German merchant ship that clandestinely provides U-boats with fuel, torpedoes, and other supplies. The filthy submariners appear at the opulent dinner prepared for them and are warmly greeted by the ship's clean-cut officers. The captain learns from an envoy of the German consulate that his request for Werner and the chief engineer, whose wife is ill, to be sent back to Germany has been denied.

The crew finishes resupplying and depart for Italy. As they approach the Strait of Gibraltar and are about to dive, they are attacked and badly damaged by a British fighter plane, wounding the navigator, Kriechbaum. The captain orders the boat south towards the North African coast at full speed, determined to save his crew even if he loses the boat. British warships begin shelling, and they are forced to dive. When attempting to level off, the boat does not respond and continues to sink until, just prior to exceeding its crush depth, it lands on a sea shelf at a depth of 280 metres. The crew works to make repairs before running out of oxygen. After over 16 hours, they manage to surface by blowing their ballast tanks, and limp back towards La Rochelle under cover of darkness.

The crew reach La Rochelle on Christmas Eve. After Kriechbaum is taken ashore to an ambulance, Royal Air Force planes bomb and strafe the facilities. Ullmann, Johann, the second watch officer, and the Bibelforscher are killed; Frenssen, Bootsmann Lamprecht, and Hinrich are wounded. After the raid, Werner leaves the U-boat bunker in which he had taken shelter, and finds the captain badly injured by shrapnel, watching his U-boat sink. After the boat disappears, the captain collapses and dies. Werner rushes to his body and surveys the scene with tears in his eyes.

== Cast ==
The U-96 officers. From left to right: the II. WO (Semmelrogge), the Commander (Prochnow), Navigator Kriechbaum (Tauber), the I. WO (Bengsch), Lt. Werner (Grönemeyer), "Little" Benjamin (Hoffmann), Cadet Ullmann (May), and Pilgrim (Fedder).

- Jürgen Prochnow as Kapitänleutnant (abbr. "Kaleun", German pronunciation: [kaˈlɔɪ̯n]) and also called "Der Alte" ("the Old Man") by his crew: A 30-year-old battle-hardened but good-hearted and sympathetic sea veteran, he complains to Werner that most of his crew members are boys. He is openly anti-Nazi, embittered and cynical, being openly critical about how the war is being handled.
- Herbert Grönemeyer as Leutnant (Ensign) Werner, war correspondent: Naive but honest, he has been sent out to sea with the crew to gather photographs of them in action and report on the voyage. Werner is initially mocked for his lack of experience, and soon learns the true horrors of service on a U-boat.
- Klaus Wennemann as chief engineer (Leitender Ingenieur or LI, Rank: Oberleutnant): A quiet and well-respected man, at age 27, he is the oldest crew member besides the Captain and is tormented by the uncertain fate of his wife, especially after hearing about a British air raid on Cologne. As the second most important crewman, he oversees diving operations and makes sure the systems are running correctly.

Johann (Leder) and the LI (Wennemann) inspecting the engine

- Hubertus Bengsch as first watch officer (I. WO, Rank: Oberleutnant): A young, by-the-book officer, he is an ardent Nazi and a staunch believer in the Endsieg. He has a condescending attitude and is the only crewman who makes the effort to maintain his proper uniform and trim appearance, while all the others grow their beards in the traditional U-Bootwaffe fashion. He was raised in some wealth in Mexico by his stepparents, who owned a plantation. His German fiancée died in a British air raid. He spends his days writing his thoughts on military training and leadership for the High Command. When the boat is trapped underwater near Gibraltar, he becomes pessimistic and begins to let go of his adherence to Nazi ideas as he finally stops shaving every day and wearing his proper uniform all the time.
- Martin Semmelrogge as second watch officer (II. WO, Rank: Oberleutnant): A vulgar, comedic officer, he is short, red-haired and speaks with a mild Berlin dialect. One of his duties is to decode messages from base, using the Enigma code machine.
- Bernd Tauber as Obersteuermann ("Chief Helmsman") Kriechbaum: The navigator and 3rd Watch Officer (III. WO) always slightly skeptical of the Captain and without enthusiasm during the voyage, he shows no anger when a convoy is too far away to be attacked. Kriechbaum has four sons, with another on the way.
- Erwin Leder as Obermaschinist ("Chief Mechanic") Johann, also called "Das Gespenst" ("The Ghost"): He is obsessed with a near-fetish love for U-96's engines. Johann suffers a temporary mental breakdown during an attack by two destroyers. He is able to redeem himself by valiantly working to stop water leaks when the boat is trapped underwater near Gibraltar. Speaks a lower Austrian dialect.
- Martin May as Fähnrich (Senior Cadet) Ullmann: A young officer candidate who has a pregnant French fiancée (which is considered treason by the French partisans) and worries about her safety, he is one of the few crew members with whom Werner is able to connect. Werner offers to deliver Ullmann's stack of love letters when Werner is ordered to leave the submarine.
- Heinz Hoenig as Maat (Petty Officer) Hinrich: The radioman, sonar controller and ship's combat medic gauges speed and direction of targets and enemy destroyers. Hinrich is one of the few crewmen whom the Captain is able to relate to.
- Uwe Ochsenknecht as Bootsmann ("Boatswain") Lamprecht: The severe chief petty officer shows Werner around U-96, and supervises the firing and reloading of the torpedo tubes. He gets upset after hearing on the radio that the football team most of the crew supports (FC Schalke 04) are losing a match, and they will "never make the final now".
- Claude-Oliver Rudolph as Ario: The burly mechanic who tells everyone that Dufte is marrying an ugly woman, and throws pictures around of Dufte's fiancée in order to laugh at them both also has a disdainful relationship towards the Bibelforscher, as evidenced throughout the miniseries.
- Jan Fedder as Maat (Petty Officer) Pilgrim: Another sailor (watch officer and diving planes operator) who gets almost swept off the submarine during a storm – a genuine accident during filming in which Fedder broke several ribs and was hospitalised for a while.
- Ralf Richter as Maat (Petty Officer) Frenssen: Pilgrim's best friend. Pilgrim and Frenssen love to trade dirty jokes and stories.
- Joachim Bernhard as Bibelforscher ("Bible scholar", also the contemporary German term for a member of Jehovah's Witnesses): A very young religious sailor who is constantly reading the Bible, he is punched by Frenssen when the submarine is trapped at the bottom of the Strait of Gibraltar for praying rather than repairing the boat.
- Oliver Stritzel as Schwalle: A tall and well-built blond torpedoman.
- Jean-Claude Hoffmann as Benjamin: A red haired sailor who serves as a diving plane operator.
- Lutz Schnell as Dufte: The sailor who gets jeered at because of his upcoming marriage, and for a possible false airplane sighting.
- Konrad Becker as Böckstiegel: The Viennese sailor who is first visited by Hinrich for crab lice.
- Otto Sander as Kapitänleutnant Philipp Thomsen: An alcoholic and shell-shocked U-boat commander, who is a member of "The Old Guard", when introduced is extremely drunk and briefly mocks Hitler on the stage of the French bordello. (In the "Director's Cut" DVD audio commentary, Petersen says that Sander was really drunk while they were shooting the scene.) Sometime after U-96 departs, Thomsen is deployed once again and the two submarines meet randomly in the middle of the Atlantic Ocean after being put off course by the storm. This upsets the Captain because it means that there is now a gap in the blockade chain. After failing to make contact later, it becomes apparent that Thomsen's boat is missing. When U-96 intercepts the convoy and sees they are without escorts, the Captain makes the observation that they must be away chasing down another boat; this boat is probably Thomsen's.
- Günter Lamprecht as the Captain of the Weser: An enthusiastic officer aboard the resupply ship Weser, he mistakes the 1st Watch Officer for the Captain as they enter the ship's elegant dining room. He pretends to be an ardent Nazi and complains about the frustration of not being able to fight, but boasts about the food that has been prepared for the crew and the ship's "specialities".
- Sky du Mont as an officer aboard the Weser (uncredited).

== Production ==
In late 1941, war correspondent Lothar-Günther Buchheim joined U-96 for her 7th patrol, during the Battle of the Atlantic. His orders were to photograph and describe the U-boat in action. In 1973, Buchheim published a novel based on his wartime experiences, Das Boot (The Boat), a fictionalised autobiographical account narrated by a "Leutnant Werner". It became the best-selling German fiction work on the war. A sequel Die Festung by Buchheim was released in 1995.

Production for this film originally began in 1976. Several American directors were considered, and the Kaleun (Kapitänleutnant) was to be played by Robert Redford. Disagreements sprang up among various parties and the project was shelved. Another Hollywood production was attempted with other American directors in mind, this time with the Kaleun to be portrayed by Paul Newman. This effort primarily failed due to technical concerns, for example, how to film the close encounter of the two German submarines at sea during a storm.

Production of Das Boot took two years (1979–1981) and was the most expensive German film at the time. Most of the filming was done in one year; to make the appearance of the actors as realistic as possible, scenes were filmed in sequence over the course of the year. This ensured natural growth of beards and hair, increasing skin pallor, and signs of strain on the actors, who had, just like real U-boat men, spent many months in a cramped, unhealthy atmosphere.

The production included the construction of several models of different sizes, as well as a complete, detailed reconstruction of the interior of the U-96, a Type VIIC-class U-boat.

Hans-Joachim Krug, former first officer on U-219, served as a consultant, as did Heinrich Lehmann-Willenbrock, the captain of the real U-96.

The film features both Standard German-speakers and dialect speakers. Petersen states in the DVD audio commentary that young men from throughout West Germany and Austria were recruited for the film, as he wanted faces and dialects that would accurately reflect the diversity of the Third Reich around 1941. All of the main actors are bilingual in German and English, and when the film was dubbed into English, each actor recorded his own part (with the exception of Martin Semmelrogge, who only dubbed his own role in the Director's Cut). The German version is dubbed as well, as the film was shot "silent", because the dialogue spoken on-set would have been drowned out by the gyroscopes in the special camera developed for filming. The film's German version actually grossed much higher than the English-dubbed version at the United States box office.

=== Sets and models ===
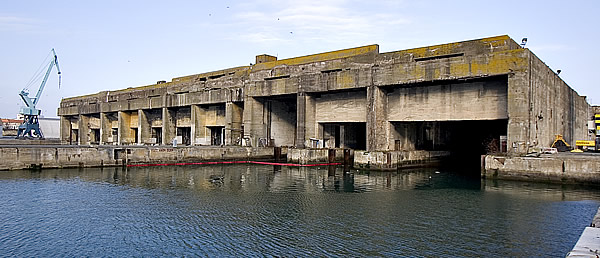
U-boat pens at the harbor of La Rochelle (2007) 46°9′32″N 1°12′33″W

Several different sets were used. Two full-size mock-ups of a Type VIIC boat were built, one representing the portion above water for use in outdoor scenes, and the other a cylindrical tube on a motion mount (hydraulic gimbal) for the interior scenes. The mock-ups were built according to U-boat plans from Chicago's Museum of Science and Industry.

The outdoor mock-up was basically a shell propelled with a small engine, and stationed in La Rochelle, France, and has a history of its own. One morning the production crew walked out to where they kept it afloat and found it missing. Someone had forgotten to inform the crew that an American filmmaker had rented the mock-up for his own film shooting in the area. This filmmaker was Steven Spielberg and the film he was shooting was Raiders of the Lost Ark. A few weeks later, during production, the mock-up cracked in a storm and sank, was recovered and patched to stand in for the final scenes. The full-sized mock-up was used during the Gibraltar surface scenes; the attacking aircraft (played by a North American T-6 Texan / Harvard) and rockets were real while the British ships were models.

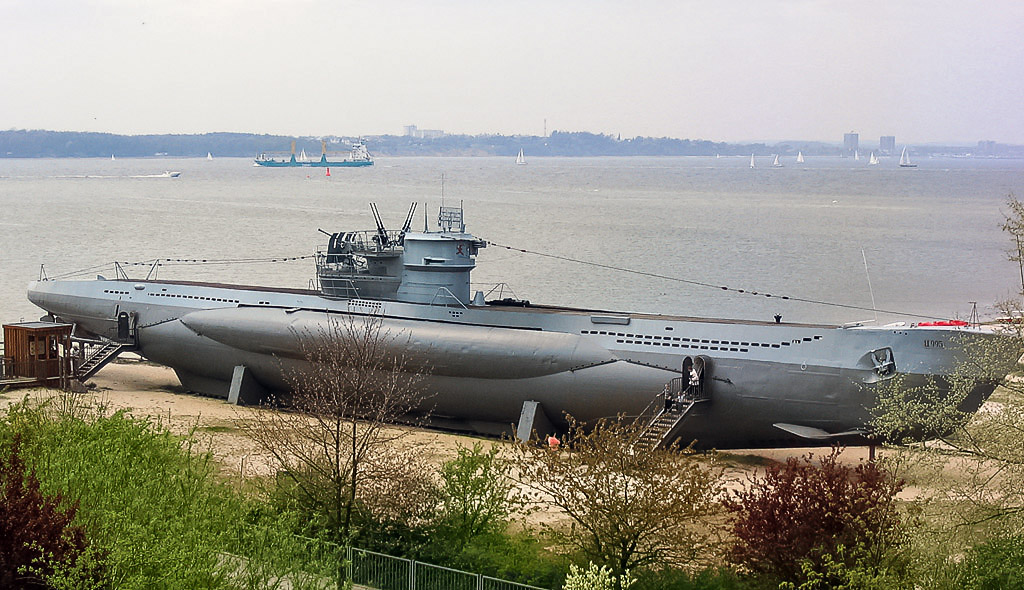
U-995, a Type VIIC/41 U-boat, preserved as a museum at Laboe in 2004

A mock-up of a conning tower was placed in a water tank at the Bavaria Studios in Munich for outdoor scenes not requiring a full view of the boat's exterior. When filming on the outdoor mock-up or the conning tower, jets of cold water were hosed over the actors to simulate the breaking ocean waves. A half-sized full hull operating model was used for underwater shots and some surface running shots, in particular the meeting in stormy seas with another U-boat. The tank was also used for the shots of British sailors jumping from their ship; a small portion of the tanker hull was constructed for these shots.

During the filming there was a scene where actor Jan Fedder (Pilgrim) fell off the bridge while the U-boat was surfaced. During the played rescue, Bernd Tauber (Chief Helmsmann Kriechbaum) really broke two ribs. This event is often purported as Jan Fedder breaking the ribs.

Mock-up of the interior at the Bavaria Studios in Munich

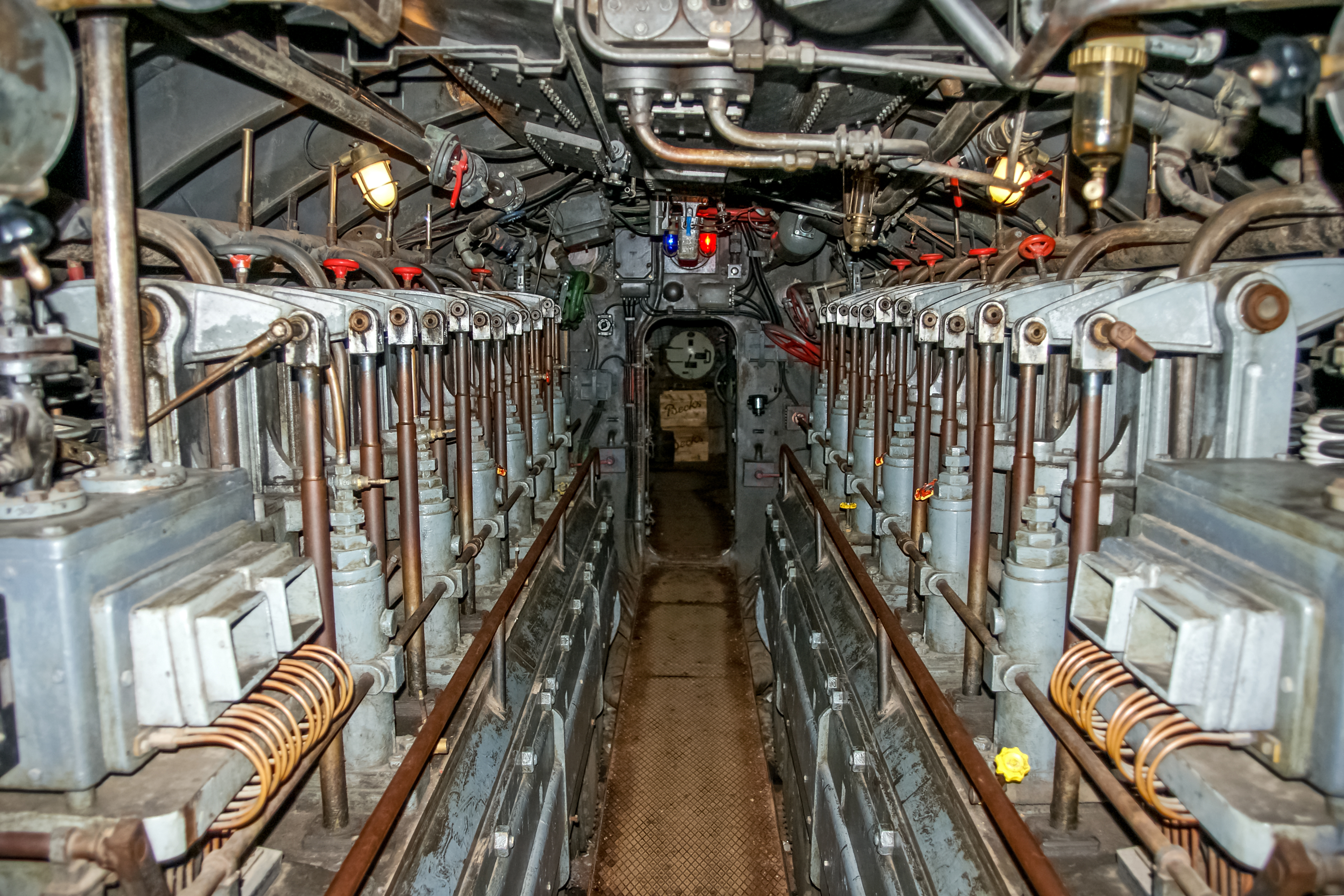

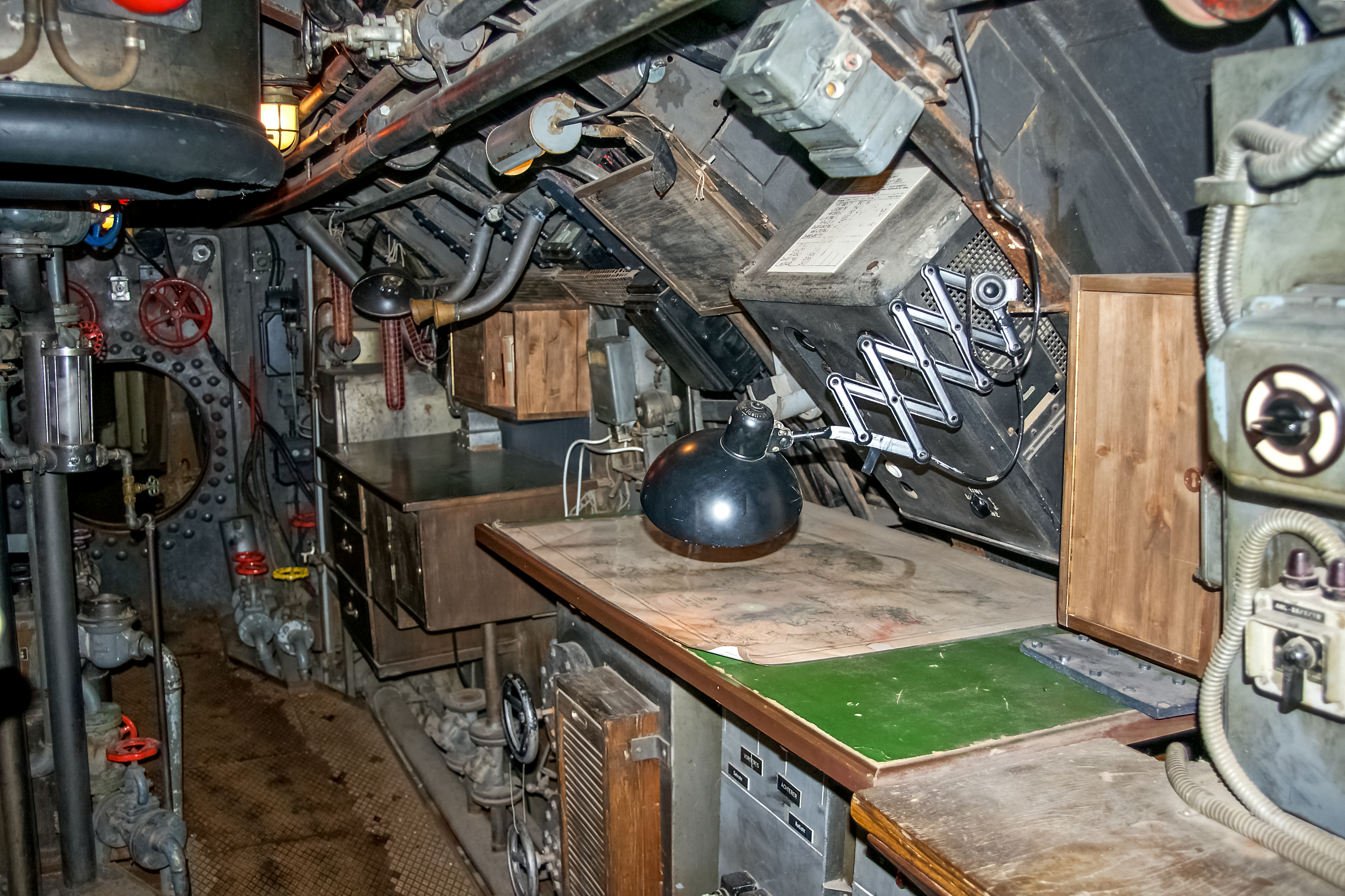

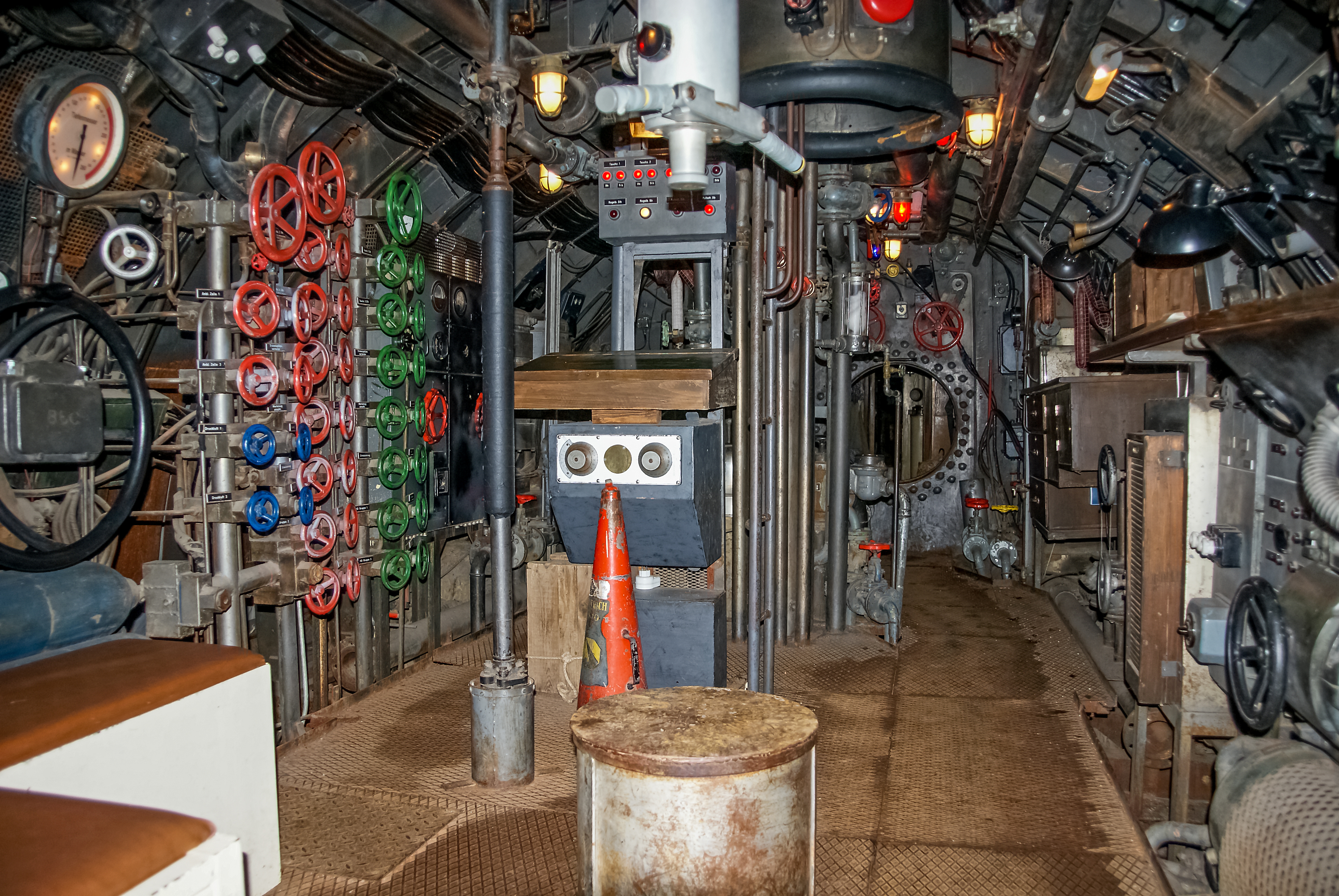

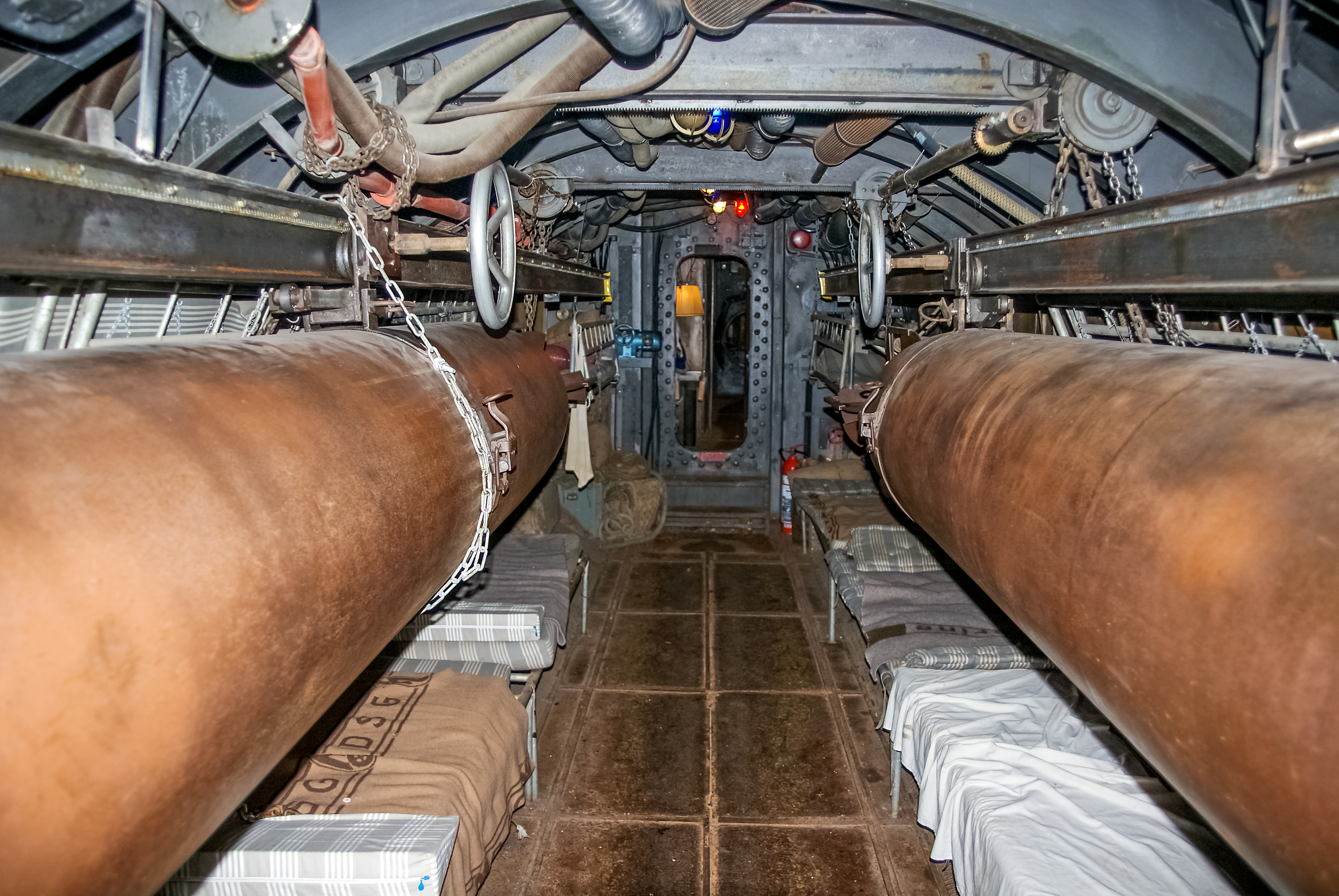

The interior U-boat mock-up was mounted five metres off the floor and was shaken, rocked, and tilted up to 45 degrees by means of a hydraulic apparatus, and was vigorously shaken to simulate depth charge attacks. Petersen was admittedly obsessive about the structural detail of the U-boat set, remarking that "every screw" in the set was an authentic facsimile of the kind used in a World War II U-boat. In this he was considerably assisted by the numerous photographs Lothar-Günther Buchheim had taken during his own voyage on the historical U-96, some of which had been published in his 1976 book, U-Boot-Krieg ("U-Boat War").

Throughout the filming, the actors were forbidden to go out in sunlight, to create the pallor of men who seldom saw the sun during their missions. The actors went through intensive training to learn how to move quickly through the narrow confines of the vessel.

=== Special camera ===
Most of the interior shots were filmed using a hand-held Arriflex of cinematographer Jost Vacano's design to convey the claustrophobic atmosphere of the boat. It had two gyroscopes to provide stability, a different and smaller scale solution than the Steadicam, so that it could be carried throughout the interior of the mock-up.

== Release ==
The film opened on 17 September 1981 and received a very wide release in West Germany, opening in 220 theatres and grossing a record $5,176,000 in the first two weeks. It became the highest-grossing German film in Germany.

The film opened in the United States on 10 February 1982.

== Different versions and home media ==
Petersen has overseen the creation of several different versions. The first to be released was the 149-minute theatrical cut in 1981.

As the film received partial financing by West German television broadcasters WDR and the SDR, more footage was shot than was shown in the theatrical version. A version of six 50-minute episodes was transmitted on BBC2 in the United Kingdom in October 1984 and again during the 1999 Christmas season. In February 1985, a version of three 100-minute episodes was broadcast in West Germany.

In 1997, Petersen edited a new theatrical release, a 208-minute version, entitled The Director's Cut, combining the action sequences from the feature-length release with the character development scenes from the miniseries, also with remixed 5.1 audio containing many new sound effects.

In 1998, this cut was released on DVD as a single-disc edition including an audio commentary by Petersen, Prochnow and director's cut producer Ortwin Freyermuth; a six-minute making-of featurette; and in most countries, the theatrical trailer. In 2003, it was also released as a "Superbit" edition with no extra features, but with a higher bit-rate and the film spread across two discs.

From 2010 onwards, the "Director's Cut", along with various new extras, was released internationally on Blu-ray.

In 2014, the 308-minute miniseries, also known as The Original Uncut Version, was released on Blu-ray in Germany with optional English audio and subtitles.

In November 2018, a "Complete Edition" was released as a collection of five Blu-ray discs and three CDs. It contains more than 30 hours of material: the Director's Cut (208 min.), the Original Cinema version (149 min.), the complete TV Series in six parts ("The Original Uncut Version", 308 min.), Bonus Material (202 min. + various trailers), the Original Soundtrack by Klaus Doldinger (38:21 min.) and a German-language audiobook of the novel read by Dietmar Bär (910 min.).

For all versions of the film, new English language soundtracks were recorded featuring most of the original cast, who were bilingual. These soundtracks are included on various DVD and Blu-ray releases as an alternative language to the original German.

- 1981 unreleased version (209 minutes)
- 1981 original theatrical cut (149 minutes)
- 1984 BBC miniseries (300 minutes)
- 1997 "Director's Cut" (208 minutes)
- 2004 "The Original Uncut Version" (293 minutes) – miniseries minus episode-opening flashback scenes

== Reception ==
=== Critical response ===
The film received highly positive reviews upon its release. Roger Ebert of the Chicago Sun-Times gave it a score of four out of four. Prior to the 55th Academy Awards on 11 April 1983 it received six nominations: Cinematography for Jost Vacano; Directing for Wolfgang Petersen; Film Editing for Hannes Nikel; Sound for Milan Bor, Trevor Pyke and Mike Le-Mare; Sound Effects Editing for Mike Le-Mare; and Writing (Screenplay based on material from another medium) for Wolfgang Petersen.

"Das Boot" isn't just a German film about World War II; it's a German naval adventure epic that has already been a hit in West Germany.

— Janet Maslin, The New York Times, 10 February 1982

Today, Das Boot is seen as one of the greatest German films. On review aggregator website Rotten Tomatoes, the film received an approval rating of 98% based on 55 reviews, with an average rating of 9.10/10. The critical consensus states "Taut, breathtakingly thrilling, and devastatingly intelligent, Das Boot is one of the greatest war films ever made." The film also has a score of 85 out of 100 on Metacritic based on 16 critics. For its unsurpassed authenticity in tension and realism, it is widely regarded as pre-eminent among all submarine films. In a 2019 poll, most US Navy personnel chose Das Boot as the "most realistic submarine film ever made". The film was ranked twenty-fifth in Empire magazine's "The 100 Best Films Of World Cinema" in 2010.

In late 2007, there was an exhibition about Das Boot, as well as about the real U-boat U-96, at the Haus der Geschichte (House of German History) in Bonn. Over 100,000 people visited during the exhibition's four-month run.

==== Buchheim's views ====
Though impressed by the technological accuracy of the set-design and port construction buildings, Buchheim expressed disappointment with Petersen's adaptation in a 1981 review. He described Petersen's film as converting his clearly anti-war novel into a blend of a "cheap, shallow American action flick" and a "contemporary German propaganda newsreel from World War II".

=== Accolades ===
Das Boot kept the record for a German film with the most Academy Award nominations, until All Quiet on the Western Front, which received nine nominations including Best Picture.

Award	Category	Recipients	Result
Academy Awards	Best Director	Wolfgang Petersen	Nominated
Academy Awards	Best Screenplay – Based on Material from Another Medium	Wolfgang Petersen	Nominated
Academy Awards	Best Cinematography	Jost Vacano	Nominated
Academy Awards	Best Film Editing	Hannes Nikel	Nominated
Academy Awards	Best Sound	Milan Bor, Trevor Pyke and Mike Le Mare	Nominated
Academy Awards	Best Sound Effects Editing	Mike Le Mare	Nominated
Bavarian Film Awards	Best Director	Wolfgang Petersen	Won
Bavarian Film Awards	Best Cinematography	Jost Vacano	Won
British Academy Film Awards	Best Film Not in the English Language	Wolfgang Petersen	Nominated
Directors Guild of America Awards	Outstanding Directorial Achievement in Motion Pictures	Wolfgang Petersen	Nominated
Golden Camera Awards	Jubilee		Won
Golden Camera Awards	Directing (25th Anniversary Camera)	Wolfgang Petersen	Won
Golden Camera Awards	Cinematography (25th Anniversary Camera)	Jost Vacano	Won
Golden Camera Awards	Music (25th Anniversary Camera)	Klaus Doldinger	Won
German Film Awards	Best Feature-Length Feature Film (Silver Award)	Bavaria Film	Won
German Film Awards	Best Sound/Mixing	Milan Bor (representing the entire sound team)	Won
Golden Globe Awards	Best Foreign Film		Nominated
Golden Reel Awards	Best Sound Editing – Foreign Feature – Sound Effects		Won
Golden Screen Awards			Won
Japan Academy Film Prize	Outstanding Foreign Language Film		Nominated
Mainichi Film Awards	Best Young Actor	Heinz Hoenig	Won
National Board of Review Awards	Top Foreign Films		2nd Place
Satellite Awards	Best DVD Extras	Das Boot: Two Disc Collector's Set	Nominated
Society of Camera Operators Awards	Historical Shot	Jost Vacano	Won

== Soundtrack ==
The characteristic lead melody of the soundtrack, composed and produced by Klaus Doldinger, took on a life of its own after German rave group U96 created a remixed "techno version" in 1991. The title theme "Das Boot" later became an international hit.

The official soundtrack features only compositions by Doldinger, except for "J'attendrai" sung by Rina Ketty. The soundtrack ("Filmmusik") released following the release of The Director's Cut version omits "J'attendrai".

Songs heard in the film, but not included on the album are "La Paloma" sung by Rosita Serrano, the "Erzherzog-Albrecht-Marsch" (a popular military march), "It's a Long Way to Tipperary" performed by the Red Army Chorus, "Heimat, deine Sterne" and the "Westerwald-Marsch".

== Sequel ==
A sequel of the same name, in the form of a television series, was released in 2018, with different actors. It was set nine months after the end of the original film, and is split into two narratives, one based on land, the other set around another U-boat and its crew. Like the original film, the series is based on Lothar-Günther Buchheim's 1973 book Das Boot, but with additions from Buchheim's 1995 sequel Die Festung.

== See also ==
- List of World War II films
- List of cult films
- U-Boote westwärts!, 1941 propaganda film
- Die Brücke, 1958 anti-war film
- The Cruel Sea, 1953 film about a Royal Navy escort during the Battle of the Atlantic
- Sharks and Little Fish
- Greyhound, A film about an American destroyer escort in the Battle of the Atlantic
