= Das Boot (novel) =

1973 autobiographical novel by Lothar-Günther Buchheim

Cover of the 1973 first edition

Das Boot (German pronunciation: [das ˈboːt], English: The Boat) is a 1973 autobiographical German novel by Lothar-Günther Buchheim based on his experiences as a war correspondent on U-boat submarines. Buchheim recorded his time on submarine U-96 and submarine U-309 during World War II. The Buchheim historical drama book was published in 1973 by Piper Verlag, the book has sold millions of copies and was translated into 18 languages. The novel portrayed the harsh and difficult submarine warfare life on a German submarine.

“I was either too hard on the Nazis or too soft on the Nazis, it merely depended on one’s attitude to Nazis” Buchheim on the Das Boot novel

== Buchheim ==
Buchheim was a painter, author, and war correspondent for the Nazi Germany's Kriegsmarine. Buchheim was employed by the Nazi propaganda company, Propagandakompanie (PK). As part of his work, Buchheim was a "guest" on board Kriegsmarine ships and submarines. The novel is based on Buchheim's six weeks of experiences on several U-boat trips. Buchheim also wrote the books The Fortress and The Farewell, in which he also used fictional names. In Das Boot, the main character is the commander, who is modeled after commander Heinrich Lehmann-Willenbrock (1911-1986) of U-96, a Type VIIC U-boat. Willenbrock was given the nickname "the Old Man" and Herr Kaleun. In Das Boot, the other officers are unnamed and referred to by their job on the submarine. One ensign is named Ullmann, and two noncommissioned officers are also named. Buchheim refers to himself as Herr Leutnant as the narrator, but not given a submarine job. In the book, the submarine is only referred to as the fictional UA. Other submarines are given fictional names: UF, UX, or UY. Places and dates are not used in the book. So while the book is in part a record of Buchheim's tenure, much of the book is fictionalized. Buchheim wrote a short story about his experiences in the 1960s. Before he wrote Das Boot, the short story was called Die Eichenlaubfahrt, (or Oak Leaves Patrol). Heinrich Lehmann-Willenbrock was awarded the Knight's Cross with oak leaves, thus the title of the short story. In 1976 Buchheim released the book U-Boot-Krieg (U-Boat War), a story of his trip on U-96 and U-309. U-Boot-Krieg including 200 photographs Buchheim took on the trips.

== Book ==
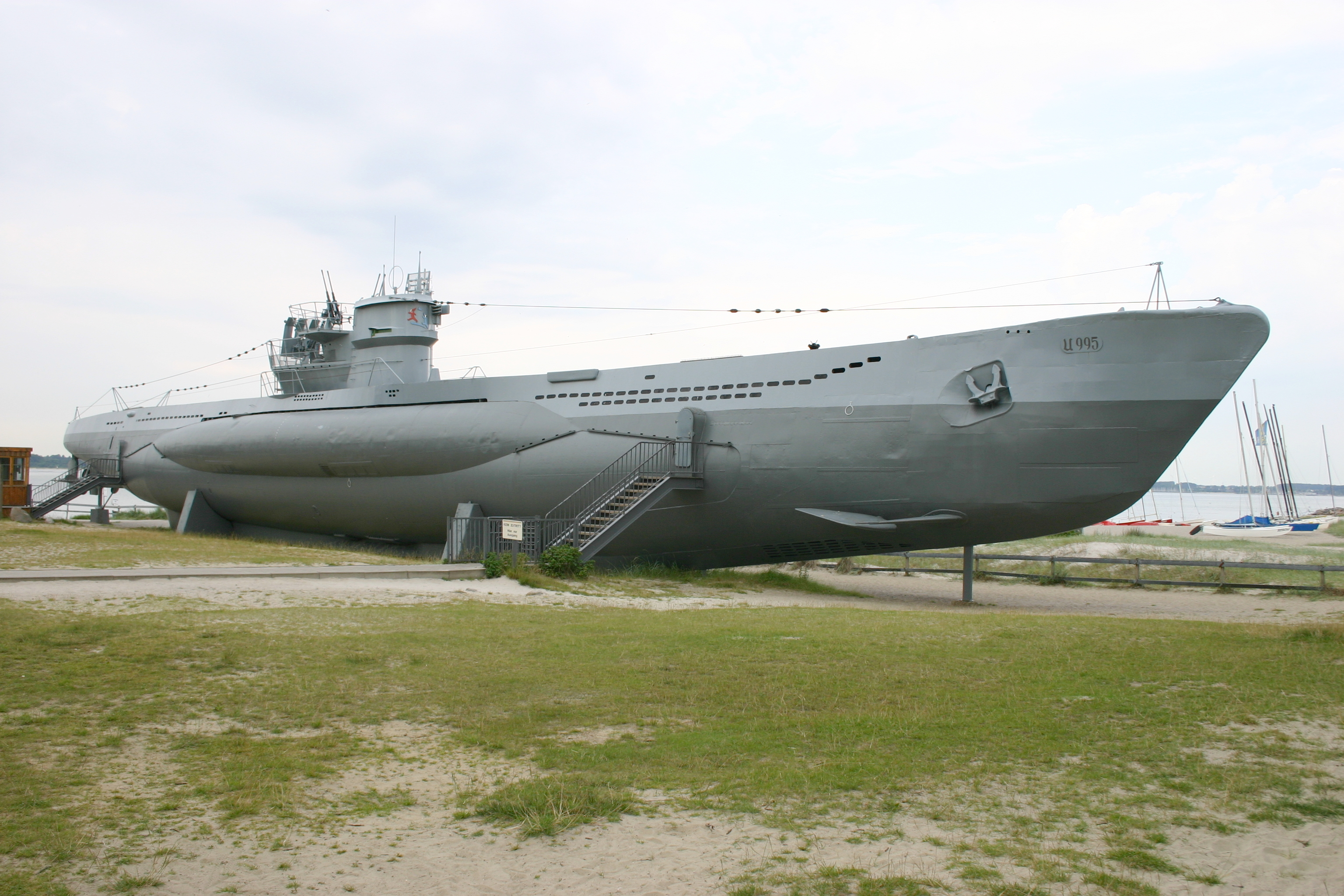
A Type VII submarine similar to U-96

Das Boot starts with the celebrations of the U-boat officers on land. The officers are enjoying life before leaving port. The crew are in a bar, Bar Royal, in northern France, near a base of the Kriegsmarine Organization. The officers talk about the dangers, Führer der Unterseeboote (leader of the U-boats), Befehlshaber der U-Boote (Commander-in-Chief of the U-boats), and Admiral Karl Dönitz. The officers talk about the Hotel Majestic near the Saint-Nazaire submarine base, a real place, a U-boat hang out. Life on the U-Boat is discussed: rules, dress code, drinking, and the tight confines on the submarine with 50 men. The base was under air raid attack as they depart. Das Boot described life on board in storms, idleness, attacks on ships, moral dilemmas to rescue or not, and hours of depth charge to avoid destroyers. The submarine is damaged and needs to return to port, but is ordered to pass the dangerous Strait of Gibraltar and operate in the Mediterranean Sea. The submarine is attacked and damaged in the Strait. The submarine dives to the bottom and works to repair the submarine. The repairs get the submarine off the bottom and she makes it to La Rochelle, a German-occupied port in France. But the submarine is sunk in an air raid at La Rochelle, with some of the crew lost.

== Reception ==
Being a novelization of real experiences, the book received mixed reviews. The book is a fictionalized autobiographical story.

- The portrayal of the submarine crew upset some German U-Boat veterans’ groups.
- Buchheim writes about the specs of the U-Boat and then has it dive deeper than it can in the book.
- written differently, thought differently, must not change such a judgement: Lothar-Günther Buchheim has written the best German novel from the front of the Second World War to date, the first that is valid, and objections that the war, Either way, it's no longer an issue, have been wiped off the desk, and off the beer table too.' – Peter Dubrow: Die Zeit, October 12, 1973.
- In Buchheim, the submarine crew is no longer the hero. The boat, on the other hand, almost becomes a hero, which, as the whale Melville described in an almost erotic and affectionate way, becomes an almost mythical object – a "dark ferry on oily-black slick, as it glides out of the submarine bunker on enemy voyages. German Werth: Der Tagesspiegel October 7, 1973

== Translations ==
Das Boot has been translated into 18 languages. The United Kingdom edition was translated into British English by John Brownjohn and published by HarperCollins in 1974. It was translated into American English by Denver and Helen Lindley in 1975 with editor-translator Carol Brown Janeway. A Dutch translation, De Boot, was published in 1974 by in den Toren.

== 1981 film ==
The book was the basis of the 1981 West German TV Miniseries and Film Das Boot, written and directed by Wolfgang Petersen and starring Jürgen Prochnow, Herbert Grönemeyer, and Klaus Wennemann. The series/film makes some changes from the novel.

== Sequels ==
Buchheim subsequently published Die Festung (1995), an immediate sequel to Das Boot, and Der Abschied, set after the war. The three books form an autobiographical trilogy.

== See also ==
- Battle of the Atlantic (1939–1945)
