= Bavarian Film Awards (Best Editing) =

This is a list of the winners of the Bavarian Film Awards Prize for Best Editing.

- 1990 Peter Przygodda with the movie Last Exit to Brooklyn
- 1993 Hannes Nikel with the movie Stalingrad
- 2018 Stephan Krumbiegel with the movie Beuys
