= Enjott Schneider =

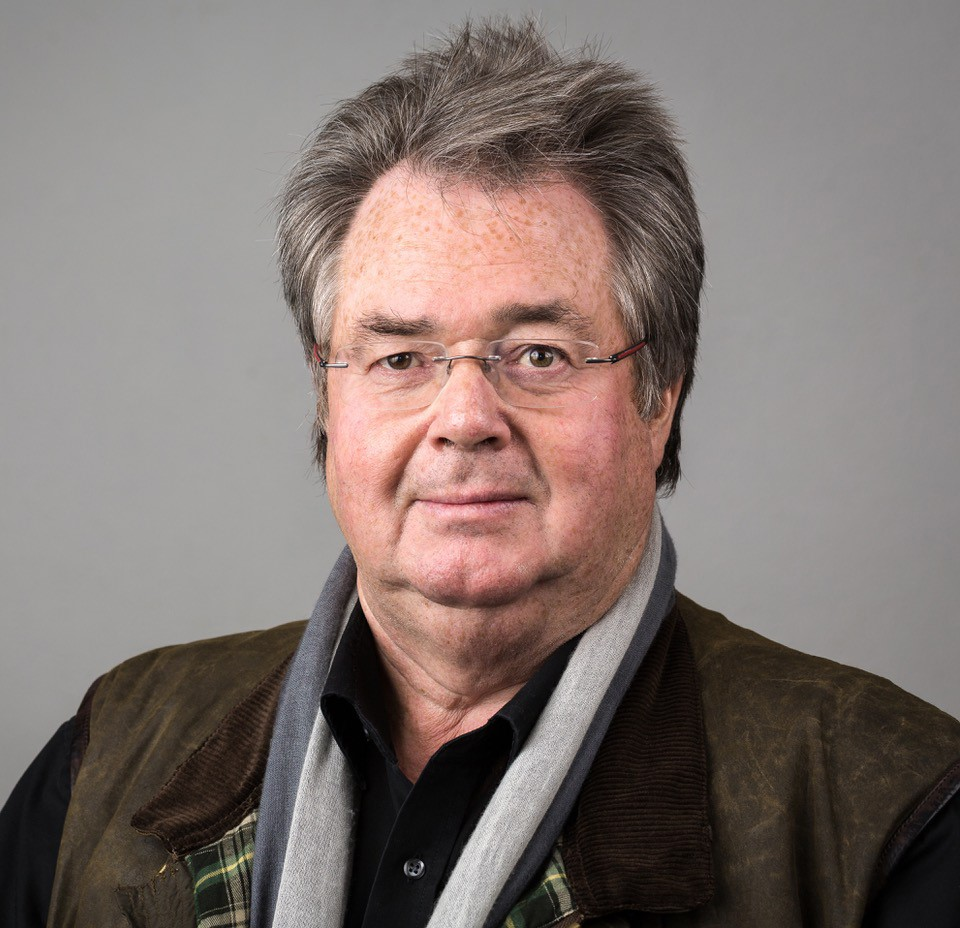
Enjott Schneider

Enjott Schneider (born Norbert Jürgen Schneider 25 May 1950 in Weil am Rhein) is a German businessman, composer, musicologist, and music educator. He was chairman of the board of the German collecting society GEMA.

As a composer he is known for his film work, having won the Bavarian Film Award for Best Film Score in 1990, the Filmband in Gold in 1991, and the Deutscher Fernsehpreis in 2007, the latter for his work on March of Millions. He composed the soundtrack for the German language movie Stalingrad. He has also composed a good deal of concert music, and occasional pieces as well.
