= Deadlock (1970 film) =

1970 film

- Italian film poster
- Directed by: Roland Klick
- Written by: Roland Klick
- Produced by: Roland Klick
- Starring: Mario Adorf; Anthony Dawson; Marquard Bohm; Mascha Elm-Rabben
- Cinematography: Robert van Ackeren
- Edited by: Jane Seitz
- Music by: Can
- Production company: Roland Klick Production
- Distributed by: Cinerama Filmgesellschaft
- Release date: 15 October 1970 (West Germany)
- Running time: 94 minutes
- Country: West Germany
- Language: English

Deadlock is a 1970 West German neo-Western film directed by Roland Klick. It is perhaps best known for the soundtrack supplied by the German rock band Can. The songs Can wrote for this film appear on their 1970 album, Soundtracks. Today Deadlock is considered a cult classic.

== Plot ==
A heat-battered young man, "Kid," wanders a desert terrain (implied to be near the California/Mexico border) with a metal suitcase full of money, a machine gun, and a bullet wound in his arm. Collapsing, he is found by Charles Dump, a former supervisor for a now-desolate mining community nearby, who initially steals his suitcase and leaves him for dead. Upon returning to the scene (possibly to either rescue him or finish killing him), Kid has revived and forces him at gunpoint to drive him to safety.

Dump lives in the deserted compound with Corinna, a former brothel operator, and Jessy, her mute daughter, whom Dump is likely the father of. Dump deduces that Kid has robbed the bank of the nearest town, and has chosen to walk the desert rather than use the train to get away to lie low. He refuses to remove the bullet from Kid's arm, hoping the injury and infection will kill him, but upon the proddings of Jessy, he finally takes it out, allowing Kid to heal. Kid warns that his partner, Mr. Sunshine, will be coming to collect the money, but Dump seems unconcerned. Mr. Sunshine does arrive, and Dump initially tries to bluff him, at one point intercepting his gun and trying to shoot him, not noticing it is unloaded. The three men proceed to play mind games with each other, Dump trying to sow doubt between the longtime partners, while Kid tells Mr. Sunshine that when he did try to hop a train to get away from the heist, he had been shot by an unknown party.

After Dump tries to steal away in the early morning with their money, but gets interrupted by the men, he later tries to leave town on a freight train, but a security bull beats him off. Walking through the desert, he is intercepted again by the robbers, who chase him in his own truck. Mr. Sunshine fatally runs Dump down. Back at his camp that night, Kid and Mr. Sunshine divide the money, and Kid spends the night with Jessy.

The next day, the men leave the compound, and Jessy follows them, hoping to tag along. When Kid tries to give her a gift, he notices Mr. Sunshine cocking a gun, and realizes he's being double-crossed. Kid and Jessy are abandoned, and some feet away, Mr. Sunshine throws out one of their guns, telling Kid he can use it on himself. Driving further away and stopping, he opens the metal case, and sees it is weighted with bricks and a note reading, "Sorry old man," and turns around to go back to the camp. He slaps Kid around, demanding to know where the money is, and then shoots both Jessy and Corinna in spite. Kid is able to turn the tables on his former friend, who has given up hope of getting the money, and shoots the older man dead. Now alone in the middle of nowhere, Kid walks off, the question of whether he has the money at all left unanswered.

== Cast ==
- Mario Adorf as Charles Dump
- Anthony Dawson as Sunshine
- Marquard Bohm as Kid
- Mascha Elm-Rabben as Jessy
- Sigurd Fitzek as Enzo
- Betty Segal as Corinna
