= Bavarian Film Awards (Best Cinematography) =

This is a list of the winners of the Bavarian Film Awards Prize for Best Cinematography.

- 1981 Jost Vacano
- 1984 Robby Müller
- 1985 Xaver Schwarzenberger
- 1986 Gerard Vandenberg
- 1988 Jürgen Jürges
- 1990 Axel Block
- 1991 Gernot Roll
- 1992 Joseph Vilsmaier
- 1994 Jörg Widmer
- 1995 Michael Epp
- 1996 Carl-Friedrich Koschnick
- 1997 Tom Fährmann
- 1998 Carl-Friedrich Koschnick
- 1999 Edward Kłosiński
- 2000 Rainer Klausmann
- 2001 Martin Langer
- 2002 Judith Kaufmann
- 2003 Franz Rath
- 2004 Jürgen Jürges
- 2005 Hans-Günther Bücking
- 2006 Andreas Höfer
- 2007 Benedict Neuenfels
- 2008 Michael Hammon
- 2009 Jana Marsik
- 2010 Matthias Fleischer
- 2011 Hannes Hubach
