= Axel Block =

German cinematographer (born 1947)

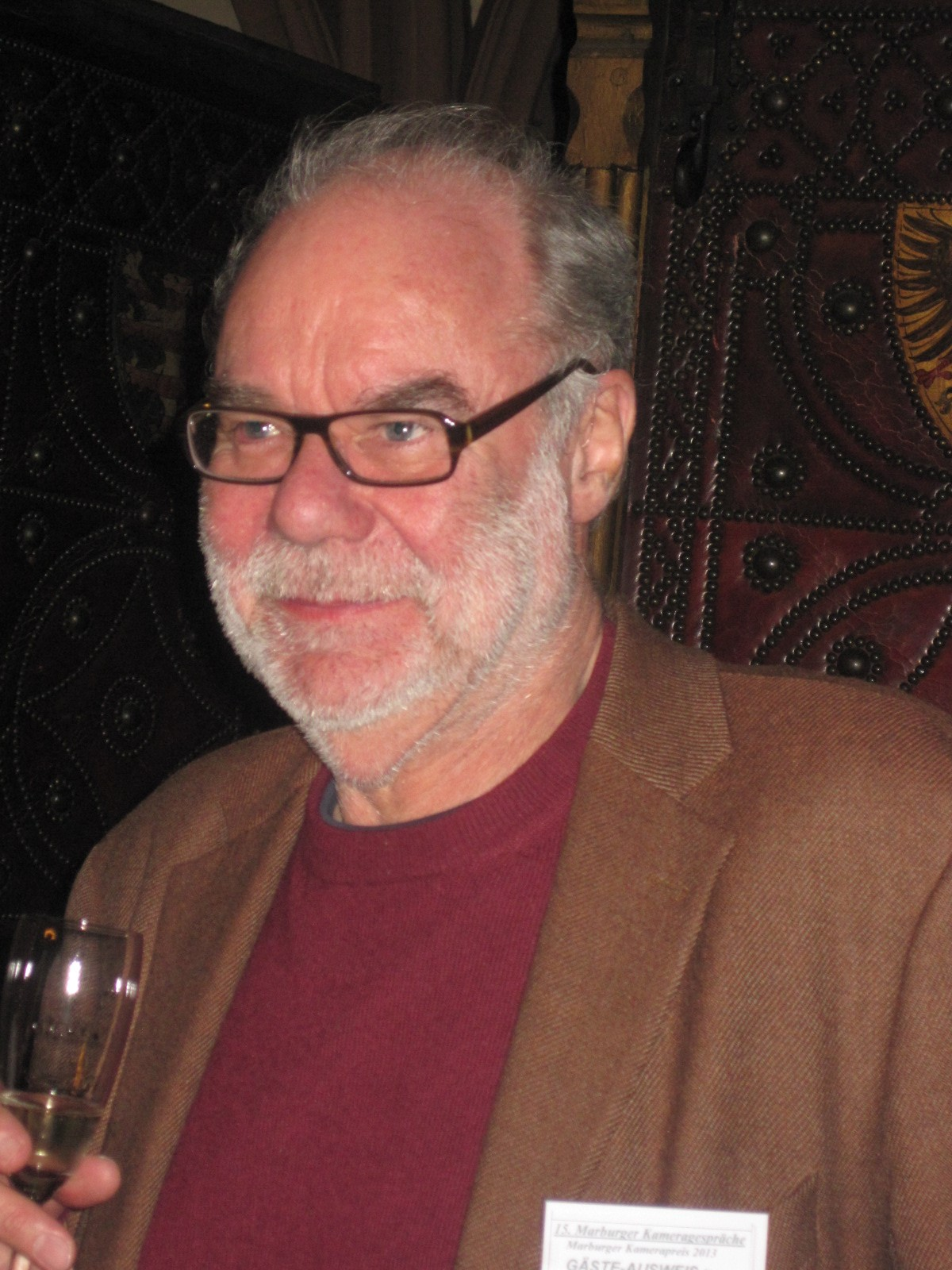

Axel Block (born July 13, 1947 in Velbert) is a German cinematographer. Since 1974, Block has worked as director of photography on more than a hundred cinema and television productions, and lectured on film composition at several academies. From 1997 to 2015, Block held the position of applied visual arts professor at the University of Television and Film Munich.

== Life and career ==
He was already interested in cinematography at the age of 13, and making amateur movies. Upon successful completion of his school-leaving qualifications, Block served an apprenticeship as a photographer. In 1968, he was offered admission to the newly founded University of Television and Film in München to train as a film director. Due to his photography expertise, Block was employed as a cameraman whilst still at college.

Shortly after graduation, Block started working as associate and assistant director. He began his collaboration with the WDR in 1974 on the feature No Reason to Worry, which reinforced his decision to pursue a career as a cinematographer. In the following years, Block continued working for television studios; he filmed When Hitler Stole Pink Rabbit directed by Ilse Hofmann and the Auf Achse series. In 1981, Block was nominated a principal cinematographer for Tatort: Duisburg-Ruhrort thriller, in which Horst Schimanski, a detective chief inspector, made his first appearance. Subsequently, Block was involved in the production of six more Tatort movies, three episodes of the Schimanski crime series from 1987 to the late 1990s, and a cinema film The Crack Connection in 1987.

From the early 1980s, Block was increasingly involved in film productions. Some of his most popular works include:

- The film adaptation of Klaus Mann's novel Flight North (1986; director: Ingemo Engström)
- The Passenger – Welcome to Germany (1988; director: Thomas Brasch)
- Go Trabi Go (1991; director: Peter Timm)
- Der Kinoerzähler (1993; director: Bernhard Sinkel)
- I Am the Other Woman (2006; director: Margarethe von Trotta)
- Vision – From the Life of Hildegard von Bingen (2009; director: Margarethe von Trotta)

In 1990, Axel Block won the German Movie Award and Bavarian Film Award for his cinematography in the 1989 documentary American Beauty Ltd.. Having already received the Promotional German Cinematography Award in 1984, Block was honored for his lifetime achievement in 2011.

Besides his freelance work as a cinematographer, Block served as an associate professor from 1975 onwards. He taught at the University of Television and Film Munich, the German Film and Television Academy Berlin, and the Academy of Media Arts Cologne. In addition, Block held a professorship at the Dortmund University of Applied Sciences and Arts from 1994 to 1997. In 1997, he returned to the University of Television and Film Munich as a professor of applied aesthetics, pictorial design, and camera technology, holding the chair of "Applied Visual Arts" until his retirement in 2015.

Axel Block is a member of the Deutsche Filmakademie.
