= Die Festung =

1995 novel by Lothar-Günther Buchheim

Die Festung ('The Fortress') is a German-language novel by Lothar-Günther Buchheim, the sequel to his 1973 Das Boot. It was published in 1995 by Hoffmann und Campe and reissued in 2005 by Piper.

== Plot ==
Die Festung is a novelised version of Buchheim's experiences after his second tour of duty as a volunteer and war artist on a German submarine, as he witnesses the collapse of the German occupation of France after D-Day. Buchheim said his purpose in writing it, like Das Boot, was to record the reality of war.

It begins in 1944, when on his return to port in Saint-Nazaire Buchheim is summoned to Berlin. There he is informed that his publisher, Peter Suhrkamp, has been imprisoned by the Gestapo but that his book about the submarine war in the Atlantic, Jäger im Weltmeer, has nonetheless been approved for publication. In his other profession of war artist, he is commissioned to paint a group portrait of Admiral Karl Dönitz and distinguished U-Boot captains, but new orders instead send him to Paris, and when the Allied invasion begins, to the front. Ordered to join a suicide mission on a fast attack craft, he instead goes to Brest, site of the fortress Brest submarine facility. Here he meets up again with his captain from his time on submarine U-96, Heinrich Lehmann-Willenbrock, called der Alte, 'the old man', in Buchheim's novels. Lehmann-Willenbrock informs him that his girlfriend, Simone Sagot, has been arrested by the Sicherheitsdienst. (Sagot, who also appears in Das Boot, is based on Geneviève Militon, whom he married.)

In Brest, Buchheim witnesses the increasing collapse of the German submarine fleet. After United States forces isolate the city, a final submarine, U-730 (in actuality, U-309), succeeds in entering the port. Lehmann-Willenbrock orders Buchheim to join its mission of carrying naval officials to La Pallice, the port for La Rochelle, which succeeds despite the submarine being greatly overloaded and having to travel submerged for almost the entire distance in order to avoid the Allies. The Battle for Brest results in the fall of the fortress. From La Pallice, with a taciturn driver and a garrulous aging submariner, Buchheim drives through the chaos and destruction of the final days of the German occupation, in a car powered by wood gas, seeking to locate Sagot in Paris. He arrives too late; either she has been deported to Ravensbrück concentration camp or he sees her being killed. The three continue to Alsace; on the way, Buchheim is wounded in an air attack. In Saverne, he confronts the officers of Marinegruppenkommando West, the regional command of the Kriegsmarine. He draws his pistol on them and then collapses.

== Publication history and reception ==
The first edition, by Hoffmann und Campe, was an unusually large and expensive book, the subject of an intensive advertising campaign. It was reissued in 2005 by Piper Verlag. Stylistically, it was evaluated negatively by Gerhard Köpf, a professor of literature.
