= Supermarket (1974 film) =

- DVD cover
- Directed by: Roland Klick
- Written by: Georg Althammer; Roland Klick; Jane Seitz
- Starring: Charly Wierczejewski; Eva Mattes; Michael Degen
- Cinematography: Jost Vacano
- Edited by: Jane Seitz
- Music by: Peter Hesslein
- Production companies: Independent Film; Klick Film
- Distributed by: Constantin Film
- Release date: 31 January 1974
- Running time: 84 minutes
- Country: West Germany
- Language: German

Supermarket (German: Supermarkt) is a 1974 West German crime film directed by Roland Klick and starring Charly Wierczejewski, Eva Mattes and Michael Degen. It was shot on location around Hamburg.

== Synopsis ==
A young drifter spurns help from a well-meaning journalist, but as he falls further into criminality, becomes involved in a plan for an armed robbery.

== Cast ==
- Charly Wierczejewski as Willi
- Eva Mattes as Monika
- Michael Degen as Frank
- Walter Kohut as Theo
- Hans-Michael Rehberg as Homosexueller
- Eva Schukardt as Anna
- Rudolf Brand as Geisel
- Witta Pohl as Frau der Geisel
- Ferdinand Henning as Peter
- Tilo Weber as Kommissar
- Alfred Edel as Chefredakteur
- Hans Irle as Polizist
- Peter Bertram
- Paul Burian as Sozialarbeiter
- Karl Walter Diess
- Heinz Domez as Zuhälter
- Rolf Jülich
- Alexander Klick as Kind der Geisel

== Bibliography ==
- Ulrich von Berg. Das Kino des Roland Klick. Filmwerkstatt, 1993.
