= Der Unsichtbare =

1987 West German comedy film

- Directed by: Ulf Miehe
- Written by: Ulf Miehe; Klaus Richter
- Produced by: Heidi Genée; Bernd Eichinger
- Starring: Klaus Wennemann; Barbara Rudnik; Nena; Benedict Freitag; Camilla Horn
- Edited by: Peter Fratzscher
- Release date: 8 October 1987
- Running time: 87 minutes
- Country: West Germany
- Language: German

Der Unsichtbare (German for "The Invisible") is a 1987 West German comedy film starring Klaus Wennemann, Barbara Rudnik, and (in a non-singing role) the pop star Nena.

== Plot ==
Peter, a successful middle-aged television talk show host, inherits a magic cap whose wearer becomes invisible. Peter decides to surprise his wife Helene but instead finds her making a phone call to her lover who, unbeknownst to Peter, is his personal assistant, Eduard. Distressed, Peter discards the cap, and unhinged by his discovery, makes a mess of his TV show by pleading on air for his wife to stop what she is doing.

Watching the program, journalist Jo Schnell, whose boyfriend is cheating on her, senses a hot story. She pursues Peter, who is becoming increasingly erratic, trying to work out the identity of his wife's lover. Helene leaves him, he loses his job, and is further hassled by the frantic attention of his mother.

Peter decides to resolve his problems by retrieving the magic cap, which he finds in a dumpster. Invisible, he returns to his TV studio to harass his boss, whose office he trashes. Also whilst invisible, he sneaks into Helene's hotel room and pleasures her in bed, beside Eduard. Meanwhile, Jo, from scrutinising photos of Peter meeting his mother, deduces the cap's magic qualities.

After leaving Helene's hotel room, Peter meets a woman in the elevator and takes her back to his apartment, whereupon Jo arrives in search of the cap. When Helene rings the doorbell, Peter bundles Jo and the woman into a wardrobe, where the cap is stored. Helene has come to collect her possessions, but when she opens the wardrobe, there is no sign of Jo or the woman. In the ensuing confusion, Jo (wearing the cap) escapes to catch a train her cheating boyfriend and his new girlfriend are taking.

Helene and Peter figure out where Jo has gone and catch the same train, where Jo, invisible, is taunting her boyfriend and his new girlfriend. Meanwhile, Peter mistakes a passenger's cap for the magic one, steals it, and causes a scene, thinking he is invisible. Train staff confine him to a compartment, from where he is rescued by Jo. The two start kissing, before being discovered by Helene. Having left the train, the three discuss the future. The film ends three months later, with the main characters using the cap to further their own ends: Peter to resurrect his TV career as a magician and Helene to steal expensive jewelry.

== Background ==
Der Unsichtbare was filmed in July and August 1986 in Munich and Vienna and premiered on 8 October 1987. It was first broadcast on television by RTLplus on 23 May 1991. It was director Ulf Miehe's last film and his first in 12 years and also the first film in 17 years for actress Camilla Horn, a star since the silent film era. Supporting actors Benedict Freitag and Nena met during filming and started a relationship that lasted seven years and produced three children. Speaking several years after the end of their relationship, Freitag described meeting Nena as "love at second sight" and being attracted to her "whole being... her spirit, humour... and the spark she has fascinates me".

== Cast ==
- Klaus Wennemann as Peter
- Rudolf Schündler as Josef
- Barbara Rudnik as Helene
- Benedict Freitag as Eduard
- Nena as Jo Schnell
- Camilla Horn as Peter's mother

== Reception ==
Der Unsichtbare received generally negative reviews. Writing a week after its release, film critic Michael Althen described the idea of an invisibility cloak as "old hat", which Hollywood had made "threadbare". Consequently, the film's director, Miehe, "lands not only on the visible but the predictable, thereby putting a fool's cap on the film".

Cinema magazine wrote, "Director Ulf Miehe has done it: Beyond the nonsense and slapstick humour of Otto, Didi, Krüger, Gottschalk and Co., he has succeeded with the comedy film "Der Unsichtbare" in achieving higher levels of humour and managing to provoke everything from smirking to doubling up with laughter."

The German film database Zweitausendeins wrote, "A turbulent comedy in which the quality of the screenplay and the solid work of the actors are hampered by the partially clumsy staging. The film is constantly appealing as, beyond all expectations, there occurs an ironic play on ways of seeing and thinking".

Der Unsichtbare was not a commercial success, failing to finish in the top 100 films in Germany in 1987. The film was shown at the Munich International Film Festival that year, with one reviewer describing it as a "work of ignorance". It has also been suggested that the film's lack of success was a prime reason for one of its leading actors, Barbara Rudnik, subsequently focusing on her television career.

Nevertheless, in 1988, Miehe and Klaus Richter were awarded the Bavarian Film Prize for best screenplay for Der Unsichtbare and Milan Bor the award for best sound for four films, including Der Unsichtbare.
