= Bavarian Film Awards (Best Screenplay) =

This is a list of the winners of the Bavarian Film Awards Prize for Best Screenplay.

- 1979 Reiner Kunze
- 1980 Judith Herzberg, Franz Weisz
- 1987 Percy & Eleonore Adlon, Ulf Miehe, Klaus Richter
- 1989 Gabriel Barylli
- 1993 Uli Schwarzenberger
- 1994 Jan Schütte, Thomas Strittmatter
- 1996 Kit Hopkins
- 1998 Rolf Basedow, Doris Dörrie, Ruth Stadler
- 1999 Romuald Karmakar, Bodo Kirchhoff
- 2000 Don Bohlinger, Christoph Darnstädt, Mario Giordano
- 2001 Franziska Buch
- 2002 Ruth Toma
- 2003 Luigi Falorni, Michael Gutmann, Hans-Christian Schmid
- 2004 Michael Gutmann, Oskar Roehler
- 2005 Florian Henckel von Donnersmarck
- 2006 Chris Kraus
- 2007 Ralf Westhoff
- 2008 Gernot Gricksch
- 2009 Simon Verhoeven
- 2010 Florian David Fitz
- 2011 Christian Zübert
- 2012 Jan-Ole Gerster
- 2013 Edgar Reitz, Gert Heidenreich
- 2014 Sarah Nemitz, Lutz Hübner, Oliver Ziegenbalg
- 2015 Burhan Qurbani, Martin Behnke
- 2016 No award given
- 2017 Sonja Maria Kröner
- 2018 Christian Petzold
- 2019 Fabian Hebestreit, Martin Busker
- 2020 Michael Herbig, Marcus H. Rosenmüller, Ulrich Limmer
- 2021 Maria Schrader, Jan Schomburg
- 2022 Felix Lobrecht, David Wnendt
- 2023 Martin Rauhaus
