= Hannes Nikel =

German film editor (1931–2001)

- Born: Johannes Maria Bernhard Nikel; 13 April 1931; Munich, Bavaria, Weimar Republic
- Died: 26 September 2001 (aged 70); Munich, Bavaria, Germany
- Other names: Johannes Nikel
- Occupation: Film editor
- Years active: 1953–1998

Johannes Maria Bernhard "Hannes" Nikel (13 April 1931 – 26 September 2001) was a German film editor. He is best known for his works in Das Boot (1981) and Stalingrad (1993), the former of which earned him an Academy Award nomination.

== Life and work ==
Hannes Nikel was nominated for the Academy Award for Best Film Editing for his work in the film Das Boot (1981).

== Awards ==
- 1992 Bavarian Film Award, Best Editing
