= Bavarian Film Awards (Best Film Score) =

This is a list of the winners of the Bavarian Film Awards Prize for Best Film Score.

- 1987 Milan Bor
- 1990 Norbert Jürgen Schneider
- 1996 Niki Reiser
- 1997 Nicolette Krebitz, Katja Riemann, Jasmin Tabatabai
- 2007 Niki Reiser
- 2009 Konstantin Wecker
- 2012 Max Richter
- 2015 Gert Wilden junior
- 2019 Arash Safaian
