= Barbara Rudnik =

German actress (1958–2009)

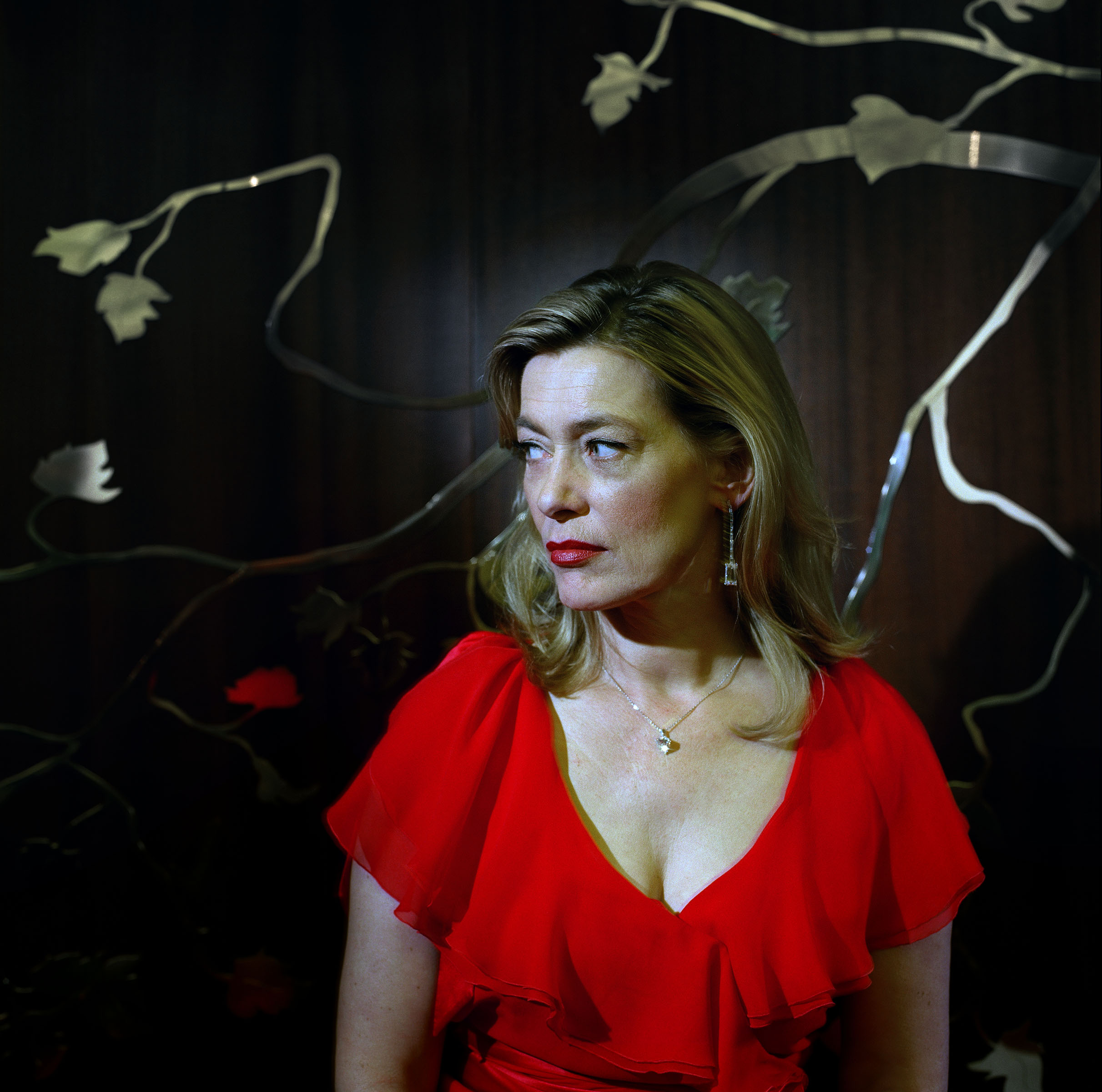
Barbara Rudnik photographed by Oliver Mark, Munich 2006

Barbara Rudnik (German: [ˈbaʁ.ba.ʁa ˈʁʊt.nɪk]; 27 July 1958 – 23 May 2009) was a German actress.

== Selected filmography ==
Film
Year	Title	Role	Director	Notes
1981	Nightfall	Annie	Beate Klöckner	
1984	Treffer	Conny	Dominik Graf	TV film
1984	Kerbel's Escape	Karin	Erwin Keusch	TV film
1984	Thousand Eyes	Gabriele	Hans-Christoph Blumenberg	
1986	Douce France	Lise	François Chardeaux	
1986	The Peninsula	Irmgard	Georges Luneau	
1986	Müllers Büro	Bettina Kant	Niki List	
1987	Der Unsichtbare	Helene Benjamin	Ulf Miehe	
1991	Forever Young	Judith	Vivian Naefe	TV film
1992	Gardes-Marines III	Elisabeth Christine, Queen of Prussia	Svetlana Druzhinina	
1995	Der Sandmann	Sabine Ammann	Nico Hofmann	TV film
1996	Crash Kids	Ute	Petra Haffter	TV film
1999	The Beast in the Lake	Eva Lehmann	Richard Huber	TV film
1999	Gefährliche Wahrheit	Ruth Jacoby	Bodo Fürneisen	TV film
2000	Komm, süßer Tod	Klara	Wolfgang Murnberger	
2002	Ghettokids	Hanna Solinger	Christian Wagner	TV film
2002	Tödliches Vertrauen	Johanna Dorn	Johannes Grieser	TV film
2003	In the Shadow of Power	Rut Brandt	Oliver Storz	TV film
2005	Oktoberfest	Birgit	Johannes Brunner	
2005	The Bodyguard	Johanna Sieber	Markus Imboden	TV film
2007	The Unknown Guest	Rebecca Brandt	Marcus O. Rosenmüller	TV film
2007	Ideal Son-In-Law	Christiane Schachtner	Michael Rowitz	TV film
2007	Rabbit Without Ears	Lilli Decker	Til Schweiger	
2009	Murder on Amrum	Carla Labahn	Markus Imboden	TV film

TV series
Year	Title	Role	Notes
1982	Ein Fall für zwei	Sigrid Vorholz	TV series episode: Zwielicht
1985	The Old Fox	Birgit Hornung / Birgit Glahn	TV series episode: Eine Tote auf Safari
1986	Der Fahnder	Ute Bieler	TV series episode: Ein König ohne Reich
1986	Irgendwie und Sowieso	Gräfin	TV series, 3 episodes
1989	Pumuckl	Reporter	TV series episode: Ein Knüller für die Zeitung
1989	Peter Strohm	Priska Rötting	TV series episode: Die Mondscheinmänner
2003–2007	Solo für Schwarz	Hannah Schwarz	TV series, 4 episodes
2006–2009	Commissario Laurenti	Laura Laurenti	TV series, 5 episodes
