= Milan Bor =

German sound engineer

- Born: 1936
- Died: 14 May 1998 (aged 61–62)
- Occupation: Sound engineer
- Years active: 1974 – 1993

Milan Bor (1936 in Prague – 14 May 1998) was a German sound engineer. He was nominated for an Academy Award in the category Best Sound for the film Das Boot.

== Selected filmography ==
- The Sternstein Manor (1976)
- The Swiss Conspiracy (1976)
- Vier gegen die Bank (1976, TV film)
- The American Friend (1977)
- The Serpent's Egg (1977)
- Fedora (1978)
- Despair (1978)
- The Marriage of Maria Braun (1978)
- From the Life of the Marionettes (1980)
- Berlin Alexanderplatz (1980, TV miniseries)
- Lili Marleen (1981)
- Das Boot (1981)
- Lola (1981)
- Dies rigorose Leben (1983)
- The Roaring Fifties (1983)
- The NeverEnding Story (1984)
- The Noah's Ark Principle (1984)
- Joey (1985)
- Enemy Mine (1985)
- Rosa Luxemburg (1986)
- The Name of the Rose (1986)
- The Aggression (1987)
- Lethal Obsession (1987)
- Der Unsichtbare (1987)
- Cobra Verde (1987)
- The Cat (1988)
- Autumn Milk (1988)
- The Nasty Girl (1990)
- Success (1991)
- Until the End of the World (1991)
- Gudrun (1992)
- Salt on Our Skin (1992)
- Stalingrad (1993)
