= Bavarian Film Awards (Production Design) =

This is a list of the winners of the Bavarian Film Awards Prize for best production design.

- 1979 Hans-Jürgen Syberberg
- 1980 Bengt von zur Mühlen
- 1993 Barbara Baum
- 2006 Uli Hanisch
