= Klaus Wennemann =

German actor

Klaus Wennemann (18 December 1940 – 7 January 2000) was a German television and film actor.

Wenneman was born in Oer-Erkenschwick, North Rhine-Westphalia. He is perhaps best known for his leading roles as the Chief Engineer, (the LI), in Das Boot, and as Faber in the TV series Der Fahnder. As an actor, he appeared in nine movies, and ten television series. He died in Bad Aibling, Bavaria, at the age of 59, from lung cancer. He was married to the same woman from 1963 until his death; they had two sons together.

Wennemann was good friends with fellow actor Jürgen Prochnow. Their real-life friendship further added to the on-screen friendship of their respective character roles, portrayed in the film Das Boot.

== Filmography ==
| Year | Title | Rolle | Notes |
|---|---|---|---|
| 1981 | Das Boot | Chief Engineer Fritz Grade - Der Leitende - Der LI | |
| 1983 | Rote Erde | Betriebsdirektor | TV miniseries |
| 1984 | Abwärts | Heinz | |
| 1984–1993 | Der Fahnder | Faber | TV series, 90 episodes |
| 1986 | Tatort: Freunde | Frieder Schoen | TV |
| 1987 | Der Unsichtbare | Peter Benjamin | |
| 1990 | Neuner | Felix Moll | |
| 1994–1999 | Schwarz greift ein | Henning Schwarz | TV series, 41 episodes |
