= German submarine U-309 =

German World War II submarine

History

Nazi Germany
- Name: U-309
- Ordered: 5 June 1941
- Builder: Flender Werke, Lübeck
- Yard number: 309
- Laid down: 24 January 1942
- Launched: 5 December 1942
- Commissioned: 27 January 1943
- Fate: Sunk on 16 February 1945

General characteristics
- Class & type: Type VIIC submarine
- Displacement: 769 tonnes (757 long tons) surfaced; 871 t (857 long tons) submerged
- Length: 67.10 m (220 ft 2 in) o/a; 50.50 m (165 ft 8 in) pressure hull
- Beam: 6.20 m (20 ft 4 in) o/a; 4.70 m (15 ft 5 in) pressure hull
- Height: 9.60 m (31 ft 6 in)
- Draught: 4.74 m (15 ft 7 in)
- Installed power: 2,800–3,200 PS (2,100–2,400 kW; 2,800–3,200 bhp) (diesels); 750 PS (550 kW; 740 shp) (electric)
- Propulsion: 2 shafts; 2 × diesel engines; 2 × electric motors.
- Speed: 17.7 knots (32.8 km/h; 20.4 mph) surfaced; 7.6 knots (14.1 km/h; 8.7 mph) submerged
- Range: 8,500 nmi (15,700 km; 9,800 mi) at 10 knots (19 km/h; 12 mph) surfaced; 80 nmi (150 km; 92 mi) at 4 knots (7.4 km/h; 4.6 mph) submerged
- Test depth: 230 m (750 ft); Crush depth: 250–295 m (820–968 ft)
- Complement: 4 officers, 40–56 enlisted
- Armament: 5 × 53.3 cm (21 in) torpedo tubes (four bow, one stern); 14 × torpedoes or 26 TMA mines; 1 × 8.8 cm (3.46 in) deck gun (220 rounds); 2 × twin 2 cm (0.79 in) C/30 anti-aircraft guns

Service record
- Part of: 8th U-boat Flotilla; 27 January – 31 July 1943; 11th U-boat Flotilla; 1 August – 31 October 1943; 9th U-boat Flotilla; 1 November 1943 – 1 October 1944; 33rd U-boat Flotilla; 1 October 1944 – 16 February 1945
- Identification codes: M 49 703
- Commanders: Oblt.z.S. Hans-Gert Mahrholz; 27 January 1943 – August 1944; Oblt.z.S.. Herbert Loeder; August 1944 – 16 February 1945
- Operations: 9 patrols: 1st patrol: a. 13 – 18 September 1943; b. 25 September – 7 November 1943; 2nd patrol: a. 19 December 1943 – 14 February 1944; b. 8 – 10 April 1944; 3rd patrol: 20 – 25 June 1944; 4th patrol: 28 June – 6 July 1944; 5th patrol: a. 12 July – 3 August 1944; b. 7 – 12 August 1944; 6th patrol: 29 August – 13 October 1944; 7th patrol: 15 – 21 October 1944; 8th patrol: 30 January – 2 February 1945; 9th patrol: 8 – 16 February 1945
- Victories: 1 merchant ship total loss (7,219 GRT)

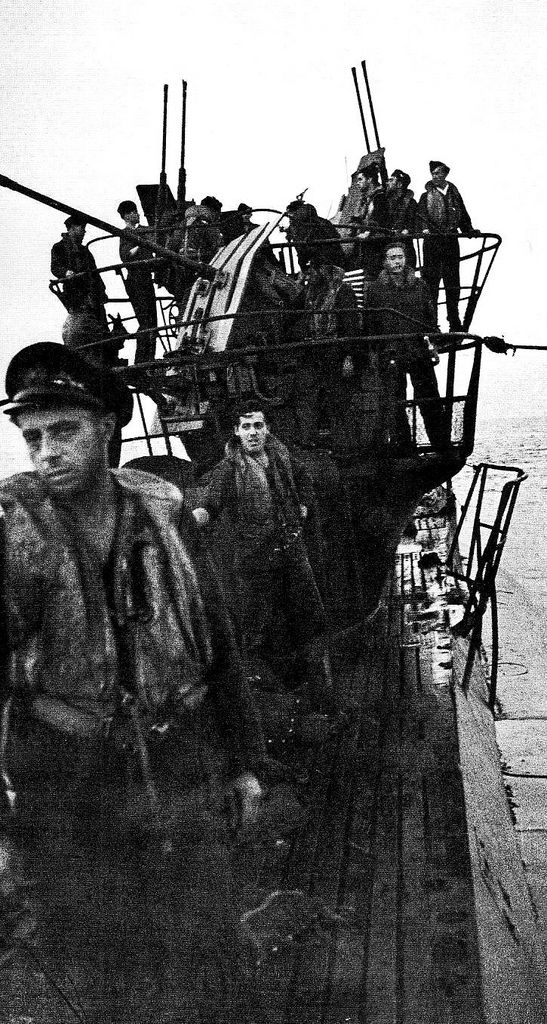

German submarine U-309 was a Type VIIC U-boat of the German Navy (Kriegsmarine) during World War II. The submarine was laid down on 24 January 1942 at the Flender Werke yard at Lübeck, launched on 5 December 1942, and commissioned on 27 January 1943 under the command of Oberleutnant zur See Hans-Gert Mahrholz. She sailed on nine combat patrols, but damaged only one ship, before being sunk off Scotland on 16 February 1945.

== Design ==
German Type VIIC submarines were preceded by the shorter Type VIIB submarines. U-309 had a displacement of 769 tonnes (757 long tons) when at the surface and 871 tonnes (857 long tons) while submerged. She had a total length of 67.10 m (220 ft 2 in), a pressure hull length of 50.50 m (165 ft 8 in), a beam of 6.20 m (20 ft 4 in), a height of 9.60 m (31 ft 6 in), and a draught of 4.74 m (15 ft 7 in). The submarine was powered by two Germaniawerft F46 four-stroke, six-cylinder supercharged diesel engines producing a total of 2,800 to 3,200 metric horsepower (2,060 to 2,350 kW; 2,760 to 3,160 shp) for use while surfaced, two Garbe, Lahmeyer & Co. RP 137/c double-acting electric motors producing a total of 750 metric horsepower (550 kW; 740 shp) for use while submerged. She had two shafts and two 1.23 m (4 ft) propellers. The boat was capable of operating at depths of up to 230 metres (750 ft).

The submarine had a maximum surface speed of 17.7 knots (32.8 km/h; 20.4 mph) and a maximum submerged speed of 7.6 knots (14.1 km/h; 8.7 mph). When submerged, the boat could operate for 80 nautical miles (150 km; 92 mi) at 4 knots (7.4 km/h; 4.6 mph); when surfaced, she could travel 8,500 nautical miles (15,700 km; 9,800 mi) at 10 knots (19 km/h; 12 mph). U-309 was fitted with five 53.3 cm (21 in) torpedo tubes (four fitted at the bow and one at the stern), fourteen torpedoes, one 8.8 cm (3.46 in) SK C/35 naval gun, 220 rounds, and two twin 2 cm (0.79 in) C/30 anti-aircraft guns. The boat had a complement of between forty-four and sixty.

== Service history ==
=== First patrol ===
After training with the 8th U-boat Flotilla at Königsberg, U-309 was transferred to the 11th U-boat Flotilla based in Bergen on 1 August 1943, Norway, for front-line service. The U-boat departed Kiel on 26 August, arriving at Bergen seven days later, on 1 September. From there she sailed out into the Norwegian Sea on 13 September, and arrived in Trondheim six days later on the 18th. As U-309 was then reassigned to the 9th U-boat Flotilla based at Brest in France. She left Trondheim on 25 September, and sailed out into the mid-Atlantic to patrol, before arriving at Brest on 7 November. During this patrol, on 30 September, U-309 suffered her only casualty, when Mechanikergefreiter Erich Jungmann was lost overboard while working out on deck.

=== Second patrol ===
U-309's next patrol took her from Brest, on 19 December 1943, out into the Atlantic west of Ireland, then back to Bordeaux on 14 February 1944. In April 1944 the U-boat was fitted with a Schnorchel underwater-breathing apparatus.

=== Third to fifth patrols ===
In June and July 1944 U-309 made two short patrols in the Bay of Biscay, before finally achieving success during her fifth patrol. The U-boat sailed from Brest on 12 July 1944 and into the English Channel. There, at 21:00 on 24 July, she fired three LuT pattern-running torpedoes at Convoy FTM-47, en route from Juno Beach in Normandy to Southend, and hit the 7,219 GRT British Liberty ship Samneva. Badly damaged, the ship was beached at Southampton, but then broke in two and was declared a total loss. U-309 returned to Brest on 3 August.

=== Sixth and seventh patrols ===
As the French bases fell to the advancing Allies, U-309 was transferred again, this time to the 33rd U-boat Flotilla based at Flensburg. Under her new commander Oberleutnant zur See Herbert Loeder she left La Pallice on 29 August 1944, and sailed around the British Isles to Stavanger, Norway, arriving on 13 October. The U-boat left there after only two days, sailing to Flensburg by the 21st. Lothar-Günther Buchheim in 1978 published photos of this patrol in his book U-Boot-Krieg (U-boat War), a nonfiction story of his trip on U-309 and U-96. Buchheim also wrote the book Das Boot in 1973, which has some of his experiences on U-309 and U-96.

=== Eighth and ninth patrols ===
U-309 left Germany on 30 January 1945, sailing to Horten Naval Base in Norway, arriving there on 2 February. She departed on 8 February, and headed into the waters east of Scotland.

==== Fate ====
There, on 16 February 1945, U-309 was shadowing Convoy WN-74 into the Moray Firth when she was detected by the Canadian River-class frigate Saint John with ASDIC (sonar). The first attack on the U-boat produced some oil on the surface. Two further attacks were carried out using the Hedgehog anti-submarine mortar, which produced more oil. The fourth attack using depth charges produced wreckage including charts, signal books and cork insulation material. U-309 sank in position 58°09′N 02°23′W. All 47 aboard were lost.

=== Wolfpacks ===
U-309 took part in seven wolfpacks, namely:

- Rossbach (6 – 9 October 1943)
- Schlieffen (14 – 22 October 1943)
- Siegfried (22 – 26 October 1943)
- Rügen 7 (28 December 1943 - 2 January 1944)
- Rügen 6 (2 – 7 January 1944)
- Rügen (7 – 26 January 1944)
- Stürmer (26 January - 3 February 1944)

== Discovery ==
The wreck of what is believed to be U-309 was located on 17 May 2001, 25 miles off Wick in 62 metres (203 ft) of water. There are no identifying features, but the Type VIIC U-boat is close to the reported position of U-309's sinking, and the damage sustained is consistent with that caused by depth charges. However, there is a possibility that the wreck may be the U-1020, which went missing in the North Sea in November 1944 and has never been found.

== Summary of raiding history ==
Date	Ship Name	Nationality	Tonnage (GRT)	Fate
24 July 1944	Samneva	United Kingdom	7,219	Total loss

== Bibliography ==
- Busch, Rainer; Röll, Hans-Joachim (1999). German U-boat commanders of World War II : a biographical dictionary. Translated by Brooks, Geoffrey. London, Annapolis, Md: Greenhill Books, Naval Institute Press. ISBN 1-55750-186-6.
- Busch, Rainer; Röll, Hans-Joachim (1999). Der U-Boot-Krieg, 1939-1945: Deutsche U-Boot-Verluste von September 1939 bis Mai 1945 [German U-boat losses from September 1939 to May 1945] (in German). Vol. IV. Hamburg, Berlin, Bonn: Mittler. ISBN 3-8132-0514-2.
- Gröner, Erich; Jung, Dieter; Maass, Martin (1991). U-boats and Mine Warfare Vessels. German Warships 1815–1945. Vol. 2. Translated by Thomas, Keith; Magowan, Rachel. London: Conway Maritime Press. ISBN 0-85177-593-4.
