= Lothar-Günther Buchheim =

German author and artist (1918–2007)

- Buchheim in 2006
- Born: 6 February 1918; Weimar, Grand Duchy of Saxe-Weimar-Eisenach, German Empire
- Died: 22 February 2007 (aged 89); Starnberg, Bavaria, Germany
- Occupations: Author, artist
- Spouse: Diethild Wickboldt (m. 1955)
- Writing career
- Period: 1941–2000
- Notable work: Das Boot
- Notable awards: Bavarian Maximilian Order for Science and Art; Bavarian Order of Merit; German Order of Merit
- Military career
- Allegiance: Nazi Germany
- Branch: Kriegsmarine
- Service years: 1940–1945
- Rank: Oberleutnant zur See
- Units: U-96; U-309
- Conflicts: World War II: Battle of the Atlantic
- Awards: Iron Cross 2nd Class

Signature
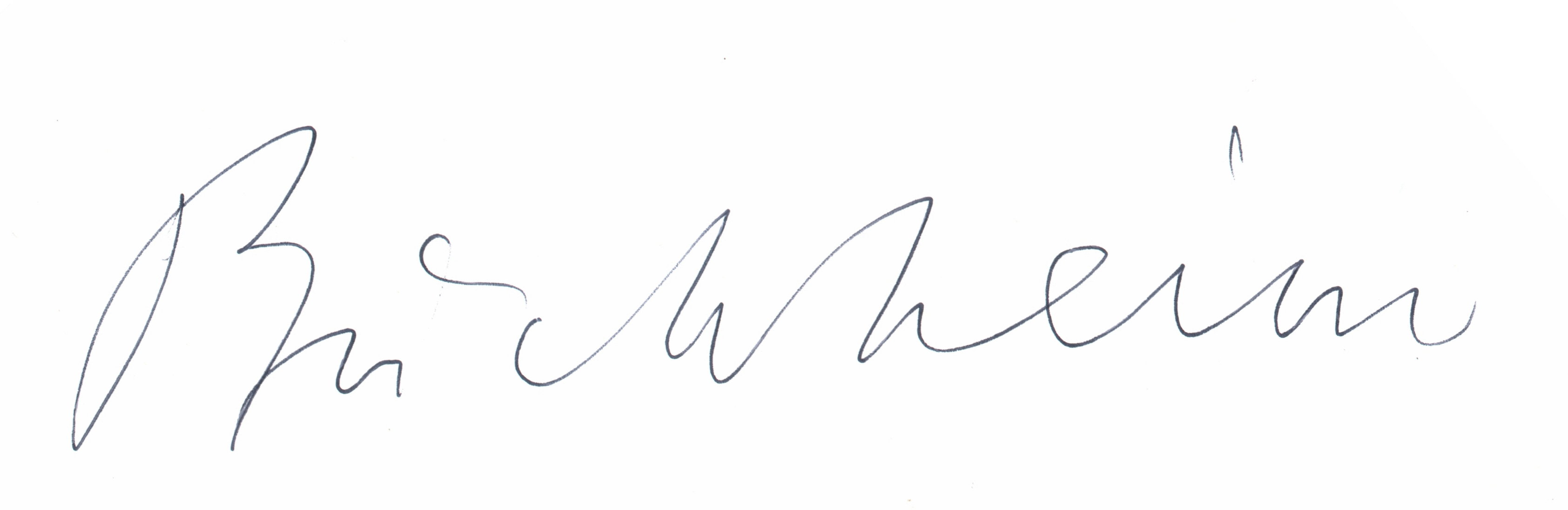

Lothar-Günther Buchheim (6 February 1918 – 22 February 2007) was a German author, painter, and wartime journalist under the Nazi regime. In World War II he served as a war correspondent aboard ships and U-boats. He is best known for his 1973 antiwar novel Das Boot (The Boat), based on his experiences during the war, which became an international bestseller and was adapted as the 1981 Oscar-nominated film of the same name. His artworks, collected in a gallery on the banks of the Starnberger See, range from heavily decorated cars to a variety of mannequins seated or standing as if themselves visitors to the gallery, thus challenging the division between visitor and art work.

== Early life ==
Buchheim was born in Weimar, in the Grand Duchy of Saxe-Weimar-Eisenach (present-day Thuringia), the second son of artist Charlotte Buchheim. She was unmarried, and he was raised by his mother and her parents. They lived in Weimar until 1924, then Rochlitz until 1932, and finally Chemnitz. He began contributing to newspapers in his teens and put on an exhibition of his drawings in 1933, when he was 15.

He travelled to the Baltic Sea with his brother, and canoed along the Danube to the Black Sea. After taking his Abitur in 1937, he spent time in Italy, where he wrote his first book, Tage und Nächte steigen aus dem Strom. Eine Donaufahrt ("Days and nights rise from the river. A journey on the Danube"), published in 1941. He studied art in Dresden and Munich in 1939, and volunteered for the Kriegsmarine in 1940.

== Second World War ==
Buchheim was a Sonderführer in a propaganda unit of the Kriegsmarine in the Second World War, writing as a war correspondent about his experiences on minesweepers, destroyers and submarines. He also made drawings and took photographs.

As a Leutnant zur See in the autumn of 1941, Buchheim joined Kapitänleutnant Heinrich Lehmann-Willenbrock and the crew of U-96 on her seventh patrol in the Battle of the Atlantic. His orders were to photograph and describe the U-boat in action. From his experiences, he wrote a short story, "Die Eichenlaubfahrt" (The Oak-Leaves Patrol; Lehmann-Willenbrock had been awarded the Knight's Cross with oak leaves). Buchheim ended the war as an Oberleutnant zur See.

== Post-war career ==
After the war, Buchheim worked as an artist, art collector, gallery owner, art auctioneer and art publisher. Through the 1950s and 1960s, he established an art publishing house, and he wrote books on Georges Braque, Max Beckmann, Otto Mueller and Pablo Picasso. He collected works by French and German Expressionist artists, from groups including Die Brücke and Der Blaue Reiter, such as Ernst Ludwig Kirchner, Max Pechstein, Emil Nolde, Wassily Kandinsky, Paul Klee, Franz Marc, Gabriele Münter, Alexej von Jawlensky, and Max Beckmann. These works had been derided as "degenerate" during the Nazi period, and he was able to buy them cheaply.

In 1973 he published a novel based on his wartime experiences, Das Boot (The Boat), a fictionalised autobiographical account narrated by a "Leutnant Werner". It became the best-selling German fiction work on the war.

His novel was followed by a non-fiction work, U-Boot-Krieg (U-Boat War) in 1976, which became the first part of a trilogy, together with U-Boot-Fahrer (U-Boat Sailors, 1985), and Zu Tode Gesiegt (Victory in the Face of Death, 1988). The trilogy includes over 5,000 photographs taken during World War II. He subsequently also wrote the autobiographical novels Die Festung (The Fortress, 1995), a sequel to Das Boot based on his travels home across France in 1944, and Der Abschied (The Parting, 2000), about the nuclear-powered cargo vessel NS Otto Hahn.

Das Boot was turned into a film in 1981, featuring Jürgen Prochnow as the captain and the debut of Herbert Grönemeyer as "Leutnant Werner". Director Wolfgang Petersen and Buchheim fell out after the author was not allowed to write the script. (Buchheim was always noted for his short temper – he was later nicknamed the "Starnberg volcano".) The film was the most expensive German film ever made. It was nominated for six Oscars.

Even though impressed by the technological accuracy of the film's set-design and port construction buildings, Buchheim expressed great disappointment with Petersen's adaptation in a film review published in 1981, describing Petersen's film as converting his clearly anti-war novel into a blend of a "cheap, shallow American action flick" and a "contemporary German propaganda newsreel from World War II". He also criticised the hysterical overacting of the cast, which he called highly unrealistic, despite their talent. Buchheim, after several attempts for an American adaptation had failed, had provided his own script as soon as Petersen was chosen as new director. It would have been a six-hour epic; Petersen turned him down because the producers were aiming for a 90-minute feature for international release. However, today's Director's Cut of Das Boot amounts to over 200 minutes, and the complete TV version of the film is 282 minutes long.

== Art collection ==
In later life, Buchheim sought a location to house his art collection, including curiosities ranging from nutcrackers and Thai shadow puppets to mannequins and carousel animals in addition to his important collection of German Expressionist paintings and graphics. A building was constructed as an extension to the Lehmbruck Museum in Duisburg, but he considered it unfit, and he turned down later offers from Weimar, Munich and Berlin. After years of quarreling with his home town of Feldafing, Bavaria, about his plans for a museum for his art collection, the town's citizens voted against the museum in a referendum. His museum finally opened in 2001 as the Museum der Phantasie in Bernried on the shore of Lake Starnberg, funded by the government of Bavaria. The entire collection has been estimated to be worth up to $300 million.

In June 2000, the Sprengel Museum in Hanover voted to return a Lovis Corinth’s painting, “Walchensee, Johannisnacht” (“The Walchensee on St John’s eve”) which its donor, Dr. Bernhard Sprengel, had purchased from Buchheim, to the heirs of Dr Gustav Kirstein and his wife Therese Clara Stein, who died by suicide due to Nazi persecution.

== Private life and death ==
Buchheim married Geneviève "Gwen" Militon, a resistance fighter from Brittany who appears in his novels as Simone Sagot, and whom he also painted. They had a son, Yves, born in 1949. In 1948, Buchheim already became father of a daughter, Nina, outside of marriage. They divorced in 1951 and he remarried in 1955 to Diethild Wickboldt.

Despite a fortune estimated at 14.1 million Swiss francs in the late 1980s, Buchheim was known for his frugality. He used a camping table in his dining room, and according to his son, did not pay taxes and reused print blocks made by Otto Müller, forging the artist's initials. His son published a highly critical biography in 2018.

Buchheim died of heart failure in Starnberg on 22 February 2007, at the age of 89.

== Awards ==
- Iron Cross 2nd Class
- U-boat War Badge
- Order of Merit of the Federal Republic of Germany, 1983

== Filmography ==
- Doctor Faustus (1982) - Dr. Erasmi
- Erfolg (1991) - Galerist (last appearance)
