= Roland Klick =

German film director and screenwriter

Roland Kirk
- Born: 4 July 1939 (age 86); Hof, Bavaria, West Germany
- Occupations: Film director, screenwriter
- Years active: 1962–1989

Roland Klick (born 4 July 1939) is a German film director and screenwriter.

== Biography ==
Klick was born in Hof, Bavaria and grew up in Nennslingen after the war. Klick studied theater and German in Munich, worked as a cameraman on a film by Rolf Schünzel in 1962 and made his first short film, Christmas, in 1963. After two other short films, Ludwig (1964) and Zwei (1965), the TV film Jimmy Orpheus was made in 1966.

Bübchen, his first feature film from 1968, was a success and Klick was hailed as the hope of German cinema. In 1970, under the protection of the Israeli military, Klick shot the Neowestern Deadlock in Israel, starring Mario Adorf. The film, for which Klick was heavily in debt, became his greatest success, both at the box office and with critics: the director received his first federal film award and the film was awarded the title "particularly valuable". Deadlock was shown in a special screening at the Cannes Film Festival. As a result, Klick received a number of offers for spaghetti westerns and from Hollywood, including from Steven Spielberg, all of which he turned down.

In 1973 he shot Supermarket with Eva Mattes, a big city film to which Marius Müller-Westernhagen contributed the title song as Marius West. In 1975, he staged Dear Fatherland Be at Peace, an adaptation of a novel by Johannes Mario Simmel. Klick received his third federal film prize for the feature-length documentary film Derby Fever USA about horse racing in the USA. In 1979 he created the German dubbed version of George A. Romero's apocalyptic horror shocker Dawn of the Dead for Bernd Eichinger's Neue Constantin Film as dialogue author and director.

Two weeks before shooting of the commissioned work Christiane F. – Wir Kinder vom Bahnhof Zoo the producer Bernd Eichinger released Klick after disagreements. Between 1981 and 1983 he made White Star with Dennis Hopper, whose cocaine addiction caused major problems during shooting and contributed to the fact that the film could only be realized as a fragment. White Star, which won the Bundesfilmpreis, was a flop at the box office.

== Filmography ==
- Christmas (1963, short film)
- Ludwig (1964, short film)
- Zwei (1965, short film)
- Jimmy Orpheus (1966)
- Bübchen (1968)
- Deadlock (1970)
- Supermarket (1974)
- Dear Fatherland Be at Peace (1976)
- Derby Fever USA (1979, documentary)
- White Star (1983)
- Schluckauf (1989)
