= Bavarian Film Awards =

German film awards gala

- Awarded for: German films
- Date: 1979
- Organized by: Government of Bavaria

The Bavarian Film Awards (German: Bayerischer Filmpreis) are film awards given to German films in the state of Bavaria, awarded by the state government.

== Background and description ==
The Bavarian Film Awards have been awarded annually since 1979 by the state government of Bavaria in Germany for "exceptional achievement in German filmmaking." Along with the German Film Awards, these are the most highly regarded awards for filmmaking achievement in Germany.

The Bavarian Film Awards gala takes place in mid-January at the Cuvilliés Theatre in Munich to honour films released in the previous year, and is one of the most glamorous highlights in the German film calendar. These awards are endowed with a cash disbursement totalling €400,000. The largest endowment, at €200,000, is given with the award for Best Producing, for "the single most exceptional German film that leaves the greatest overall impression."

The other awards are each given with endowments of €10,000–25,000. Award winners are also given a porcelain statuette of the Commedia dell'arte character Pierrot, designed by Franz Anton Bustelli and manufactured in the Nymphenburg Porcelain Manufactory in Munich.

== Categories ==
The award winners are chosen by a state-appointed jury in the following categories:

- Best Producing – (winners)
- Best Directing – (winners)
- Best Acting – (winners)
- Best Screenplay – (winners)
- Best Cinematography – (winners)
- Best Editing – (winners)
- Best Film Score – (winners)
- Best Production Design – (winners)
- Best Documentary Film – (winners)
- Best Young People's Film – (winners)
- Special Prize – (winners)

The Prime Minister of Bavaria is also able to grant an Honorary Award – (winners)

== See also ==
- German Directors Guild Awards
