= List of Derrick episodes =

The following is an episode list for the German television series Derrick. There were a total of 281 episodes aired originally on ZDF (in Germany), ORF (in Austria) and SRG (in Switzerland) between 20 October 1974 and 16 October 1998 (25 seasons). The show was about Chief Inspector (Oberinspektor) Stephan Derrick (Horst Tappert) and his loyal assistant Inspector (Kriminalhauptmeister) Harry Klein (Fritz Wepper), who solve murder cases in Munich and surroundings. Here you also find the actors of each episode of Derrick.

== Episodes ==
=== Season 1 (1974) ===
| No. overall | No. in season | Title | Original release date |
|---|---|---|---|
| 1 | 1 | "Waldweg" | 20 October 1974 |
Cast: Horst Tappert, Fritz Wepper, Wolfgang Kieling, Lina Carstens, Klaus Höhne, Karl Lieffen, Walter Sedlmayr
| 2 | 2 | "Johanna" | 3 November 1974 |
Cast: Horst Tappert, Fritz Wepper, Lilli Palmer, Helmuth Lohner, Helga Anders
| 3 | 3 | "Stiftungsfest" | 11 December 1974 |
Cast: Horst Tappert, Fritz Wepper, Siegfried Lowitz, Andrea Rau

=== Season 2 (1975) ===
| No. overall | No. in season | Title | Original release date |
|---|---|---|---|
| 4 | 1 | "Mitternachtsbus" | 12 January 1975 |
Cast: Horst Tappert, Fritz Wepper, Werner Kreindl, Hartmut Becker, Lambert Hamel, Horst Sachtleben
| 5 | 2 | "Tod am Bahngleis" | 9 February 1975 |
Cast: Horst Tappert, Fritz Wepper, Peter Kuiper, Günter Strack, Ulli Kinalzik, Christine Buchegger, Günther Stoll, Eleonore Weisgerber
| 6 | 3 | "Nur Aufregungen für Rohn" | 9 March 1975 |
Cast: Horst Tappert, Fritz Wepper, Thomas Fritsch, Helmut Käutner, Michael Ande, Peter Capell
| 7 | 4 | "Madeira" | 6 April 1975 |
Cast: Horst Tappert, Fritz Wepper, Curd Jürgens, Susanne Uhlen, Paula Denk, Inge Birkmann, Elfriede Kuzmany
| 8 | 5 | "Zeichen der Gewalt" | 4 May 1975 |
Cast: Horst Tappert, Fritz Wepper, Willy Schäfer, Joachim Bissmeier, Sybil Danning, Raimund Harmstorf, Jan Hendriks, Rudolf Schündler, Eric Pohlmann
| 9 | 6 | "Paddenberg" | 1 June 1975 |
Cast: Horst Tappert, Fritz Wepper, Anaid Iplicjian, Heinz Bennent, Ernst Jacobi, Edith Schultze-Westrum
| 10 | 7 | "Hoffmanns Höllenfahrt" | 29 June 1975 |
Cast: Horst Tappert, Fritz Wepper, Judy Winter, Klaus Löwitsch, Pierre Franckh, Willy Schäfer, Ingrid Steeger
| 11 | 8 | "Pfandhaus" | 27 July 1975 |
Cast: Horst Tappert, Fritz Wepper, Johanna von Koczian, Klaus Maria Brandauer, Gusti Wolf
| 12 | 9 | "Ein Koffer aus Salzburg" | 24 August 1975 |
Cast: Horst Tappert, Fritz Wepper, Willy Schäfer, Jacques Breuer, Traugott Buhre, Günther Stoll, Volker Prechtel
| 13 | 10 | "Kamillas junger Freund" | 21 September 1975 |
Cast: Horst Tappert, Fritz Wepper, Willy Schäfer, Luitgard Im, Siegfried Wischnewski, Harry Meyen, Hans Georg Panczak, Gerd Böckmann, Günther Stoll, Bruno Dallansky, Werner Schnitzer, Albert Bessler
| 14 | 11 | "Der Tag nach dem Mord" | 19 October 1975 |
Cast: Horst Tappert, Fritz Wepper, Alexander Kerst
| 15 | 12 | "Alarm auf Revier 12" | 14 December 1975 |
Cast: Horst Tappert, Fritz Wepper, Günther Stoll, Carl Möhner, Walter Sedlmayr, Peter Capell

=== Season 3 (1976) ===
| No. overall | No. in season | Title | Original release date |
|---|---|---|---|
| 16 | 1 | "Tod der Kolibris" | 11 January 1976 |
Cast: Horst Tappert, Fritz Wepper, Ernst Schröder, Günther Stoll, Hans Stetter
| 17 | 2 | "Tod des Trompeters" | 8 February 1976 |
Cast: Horst Tappert, Fritz Wepper, Willy Schäfer, Sabine von Maydell, Alexander Stephan, Sky Dumont
| 18 | 3 | "Angst" | 7 March 1976 |
Cast: Horst Tappert, Fritz Wepper, Uschi Glas, Bernd Herzsprung, Heidelinde Weis, Hans Dieter Zeidler
| 19 | 4 | "Tote Vögel singen nicht" | 4 April 1976 |
Cast: Horst Tappert, Fritz Wepper, Harald Leipnitz, Günther Stoll, Dieter Eppler, Ulli Kinalzik, Doris Kunstmann
| 20 | 5 | "Schock" | 2 May 1976 |
Cast: Horst Tappert, Fritz Wepper, Johanna von Koczian, Karin Baal, Dirk Galuba, Günther Stoll, Jan Hendriks, Dieter Eppler
| 21 | 6 | "Kalkutta" | 30 May 1976 |
Cast: Horst Tappert, Fritz Wepper, Karl Michael Vogler, Pinkas Braun, Richard Münch, Willy Schäfer, Edith Schultze-Westrum, Jan Hendriks, Volkert Kraeft, Eduard Linkers
| 22 | 7 | "Kein schöner Sonntag" | 27 June 1976 |
Cast: Horst Tappert, Fritz Wepper, Ullrich Haupt, Johanna Hofer
| 23 | 8 | "Auf eigene Faust" | 11 July 1976 |
Cast: Horst Tappert, Fritz Wepper, Horst Frank, Karl John, Helmut Käutner, Siegfried Rauch, Günther Stoll
| 24 | 9 | "Ein unbegreiflicher Typ" | 25 July 1976 |
Cast: Horst Tappert, Fritz Wepper, Günther Stoll, Hilde Krahl, Carl-Heinz Schroth, Jürgen Goslar, Jan Niklas
| 25 | 10 | "Das Bordfest" | 8 August 1976 |
Cast: Horst Tappert, Fritz Wepper, Judy Winter, Ernst Schröder, Mathieu Carrière, Wolfgang Reichmann, Walter Schmidinger
| 26 | 11 | "Das Superding" | 5 September 1976 |
Cast: Horst Tappert, Fritz Wepper, Günther Stoll, Horst Buchholz, Gottfried John, Horst Sachtleben, Werner Abrolat
| 27 | 12 | "Risiko" | 19 September 1976 |
Cast: Horst Tappert, Fritz Wepper, Günther Stoll, Wilfried Klaus, Wolfgang Müller
| 28 | 13 | "Pecko" | 3 October 1976 |
Cast: Horst Tappert, Fritz Wepper, Pierre Franckh, Harald Juhnke, Günther Stoll, Willy Schäfer
| 29 | 14 | "Der Mann aus Portofino" | 28 November 1976 |
Cast: Horst Tappert, Fritz Wepper, Kurt Meisel, Reinhard Kolldehoff, Günther Stoll, Amedeo Nazzari

=== Season 4 (1977) ===
| No. overall | No. in season | Title | Original release date |
|---|---|---|---|
| 30 | 1 | "Yellow He" | 23 January 1977 |
Cast: Horst Tappert, Fritz Wepper, Susanne Beck (name-part), Martin Semmelrogge, Maria Schell, Karl Lieffen, Günther Stoll
| 31 | 2 | "Hals in der Schlinge" | 6 February 1977 |
Cast: Horst Tappert, Fritz Wepper, Helga Anders, Willi Kovalj, Herbert Fleischmann, Günter Strack, Carola Höhn, Christine Kaufmann, Günther Stoll
| 32 | 3 | "Eine Nacht im Oktober" | 6 March 1977 |
Cast: Horst Tappert, Fritz Wepper, Bernhard Wicki, Traugott Buhre, Brigitte Horney, Günther Stoll, Sabine von Maydell, Iris Berben, Carl Lange, Günther Kaufmann, Gertrud Kückelmann
| 33 | 4 | "Offene Rechnung" | 20 March 1977 |
Cast: Horst Tappert, Fritz Wepper, Günther Stoll, Rudolf Fernau, Rudolf Schündler
| 34 | 5 | "Tod des Wucherers" | 3 April 1977 |
Cast: Horst Tappert, Fritz Wepper, Günther Stoll, Gerd Baltus, Ida Krottendorf, Peter Kuiper, Agnes Dünneisen, Ursula Grabley
| 35 | 6 | "Das Kuckucksei" | 12 June 1977 |
Cast: Horst Tappert, Fritz Wepper, Günther Stoll, Gerd Böckmann, Werner Hinz, Alexander Kerst, Elisabeth Volkmann
| 36 | 7 | "Mord im TEE 91" | 10 July 1977 |
Cast: Horst Tappert, Fritz Wepper, Willy Schäfer, Harry Meyen, Siegfried Rauch, Hans Stetter
| 37 | 8 | "Via Bangkok" | 21 August 1977 |
Cast: Horst Tappert, Fritz Wepper, Cornelia Froboess, Christian Wolff, Peter Capell
| 38 | 9 | "Inkasso" | 18 September 1977 |
Cast: Horst Tappert, Fritz Wepper, Dirk Galuba, Lisa Kreuzer, Wolfgang Müller
| 39 | 10 | "Tote im Wald" | 16 October 1977 |
Cast: Horst Tappert, Fritz Wepper, Willy Schäfer, Gaby Dohm, Martin Lüttge, Günther Neutze, Max Grießer

=== Season 5 (1978) ===
| No. overall | No. in season | Title | Original release date |
|---|---|---|---|
| 40 | 1 | "Der Fotograf" | 6 January 1978 |
Cast: Horst Tappert, Fritz Wepper, Willy Schäfer, Bruno Dietrich, Christine Buchegger, Mijou Kovacs, Jürgen Goslar, Rudolf Wessely, Herbert Mensching
| 41 | 2 | "Tod eines Fans" | 3 February 1978 |
Cast: Horst Tappert, Fritz Wepper, Hannes Messemer, Christian Kohlund, Eva Kotthaus, Helga Anders, Eduard Linkers, Tommi Piper
| 42 | 3 | "Abendfrieden" | 24 February 1978 |
Cast: Horst Tappert, Fritz Wepper, Alice Treff, Thomas Fritsch, Dietlinde Turban, Rudolf Schündler, Harry Hardt, Klaus Höhne, Lotte Ledl
| 43 | 4 | "Ein Hinterhalt" | 31 March 1978 |
Cast: Horst Tappert, Fritz Wepper, Ruth Leuwerik, Hans Georg Panczak, Traugott Buhre, Werner Asam, Heiner Lauterbach, Helmut Fischer
| 44 | 5 | "Steins Tochter" | 5 May 1978 |
Cast: Horst Tappert, Fritz Wepper, Hartmut Becker, Katerina Jacob
| 45 | 6 | "Klavierkonzert" | 16 June 1978 |
Cast: Horst Tappert, Fritz Wepper, Maria Schell, Peter Fricke, Jutta Speidel, Eric Pohlmann, Iris Berben, Sky Dumont
| 46 | 7 | "Kaffee mit Beate" | 14 July 1978 |
Cast: Horst Tappert, Fritz Wepper, Willy Schäfer, Helga Anders, Klaus Herm, Christian Quadflieg
| 47 | 8 | "Solo für Margarete" | 4 August 1978 |
Cast: Horst Tappert, Fritz Wepper, Willy Schäfer, Horst Buchholz, Lisa Kreuzer, Jacques Breuer, Elisabeth Neumann-Viertel, Susanne Beck
| 48 | 9 | "Lissas Vater" | 25 August 1978 |
Cast: Horst Tappert, Fritz Wepper, Willy Schäfer, Ullrich Haupt, Christine Wodetzky, Heinz Bennent, Anne Bennent, Carola Höhn
| 49 | 10 | "Der Spitzel" | 22 September 1978 |
Cast: Horst Tappert, Fritz Wepper, Willy Schäfer, Götz George, Ulli Kinalzik, Horst Sachtleben, Kai Fischer
| 50 | 11 | "Die verlorenen Sekunden" | 20 October 1978 |
Cast: Horst Tappert, Fritz Wepper, Willy Schäfer, Hans Korte, Eduard Linkers
| 51 | 12 | "Ute und Manuela" | 17 November 1978 |
Cast: Horst Tappert, Fritz Wepper, Willy Schäfer, Cornelia Froboess, Monika Baumgartner, Gisela Uhlen, Werner Asam, Martin Semmelrogge
| 52 | 13 | "Abitur" | 15 December 1978 |
Cast: Horst Tappert, Fritz Wepper, Willy Schäfer, Dietlinde Turban, Wilfried Klaus, Agnes Dünneisen

=== Season 6 (1979) ===
| No. overall | No. in season | Title | Original release date |
|---|---|---|---|
| 53 | 1 | "Der L-Faktor" | 5 January 1979 |
Cast: Horst Tappert, Fritz Wepper, Willy Schäfer, Mathieu Carrière, Wolfgang Müller
| 54 | 2 | "Anschlag auf Bruno" | 2 February 1979 |
Cast: Horst Tappert, Fritz Wepper, Willy Schäfer, Peter Ehrlich, Doris Schade, Heiner Lauterbach, Dieter Schidor, Michaela May, Gunther Beth
| 55 | 3 | "Schubachs Rückkehr" | 9 March 1979 |
Cast: Horst Tappert, Fritz Wepper, Willy Schäfer, Christine Buchegger, Claus Biederstaedt, Rudolf Wessely
| 56 | 4 | "Ein unheimliches Haus" | 30 March 1979 |
Cast: Horst Tappert, Fritz Wepper, Willy Schäfer, Eva Kotthaus, Paul Hoffmann, Lisa Kreuzer, Sascha Hehn
| 57 | 5 | "Die Puppe" | 11 May 1979 |
Cast: Horst Tappert, Fritz Wepper, Willy Schäfer, Werner Schulenberg, Siegfried Wischnewski
| 58 | 6 | "Tandem" | 8 June 1979 |
Cast: Horst Tappert, Fritz Wepper, Willy Schäfer, Raimund Harmstorf, Dirk Galuba, Dan van Husen
| 59 | 7 | "Lena" | 29 June 1979 |
Cast: Horst Tappert, Fritz Wepper, Willy Schäfer, Ursula Lingen, Rolf Becker, Paul Muller, Rudolf Schündler
| 60 | 8 | "Besuch aus New York" | 27 July 1979 |
Cast: Horst Tappert, Fritz Wepper, Willy Schäfer, Brad Harris
| 61 | 9 | "Ein Kongreß in Berlin" | 24 August 1979 |
Cast: Horst Tappert, Fritz Wepper, Will Quadflieg, Judy Winter, Bernd Herzsprung, Claudia Demarmels, Dirk Galuba, Rainer Hunold
| 62 | 10 | "Das dritte Opfer" | 28 September 1979 |
Cast: Horst Tappert, Fritz Wepper, Willy Schäfer, Jutta Speidel, Lambert Hamel, Heinz Drache, Gudo Hoegel, Bruno Dallansky, Carola Höhn
| 63 | 11 | "Die Versuchung" | 26 October 1979 |
Cast: Horst Tappert, Fritz Wepper, Willy Schäfer, Peter Fricke
| 64 | 12 | "Ein Todesengel" | 23 November 1979 |
Cast: Horst Tappert, Fritz Wepper, Willy Schäfer, Sabine von Maydell, Christian Quadflieg, Brigitte Mira, Thomas Fritsch, Stephan Miller, Anton Feichtner
| 65 | 13 | "Karo As" | 21 December 1979 |
Cast: Horst Tappert, Fritz Wepper, Klausjürgen Wussow

=== Season 7 (1980) ===
| No. overall | No. in season | Title | Original release date |
|---|---|---|---|
| 66 | 1 | "Hanna, liebe Hanna" | 4 January 1980 |
Cast: Horst Tappert, Fritz Wepper, Willy Schäfer, Ute Christensen, Jürgen Goslar, Rudolf Wessely
| 67 | 2 | "Unstillbarer Hunger" | 25 January 1980 |
Cast: Horst Tappert, Fritz Wepper, Peter Fricke, Diana Körner, Pierre Franckh
| 68 | 3 | "Ein Lied aus Theben" | 7 March 1980 |
Cast: Horst Tappert, Fritz Wepper, Siegfried Wischnewski Werner Schulenberg
| 69 | 4 | "Tödliche Sekunde" | 7 March 1980 |
Cast: Horst Tappert, Fritz Wepper, Willy Schäfer, Uwe Ochsenknecht, Werner Kreindl, Lisa Kreuzer, Werner Asam, Dan van Husen, Ida Krottendorf
| 70 | 5 | "Ein tödlicher Preis" | 2 May 1980 |
Cast: Horst Tappert, Fritz Wepper, Willy Schäfer, Ekkehardt Belle, Monika Baumgartner, Kurt Weinzierl, Christiane Hammacher, Anton Feichtner
| 71 | 6 | "Die Entscheidung" | 30 May 1980 |
Cast: Horst Tappert, Fritz Wepper, Willy Schäfer, Hannes Messemer, Brigitte Horney, Gisela Uhlen, Christiane Krüger, Karl Heinz Vosgerau, Sky Dumont
| 72 | 7 | "Der Tod sucht Abonnenten" | 27 June 1980 |
Cast: Horst Tappert, Fritz Wepper, Willy Schäfer, Verena Peter, Manfred Zapatka, Jacques Breuer
| 73 | 8 | "Auf einem Gutshof" | 1 August 1980 |
Cast: Horst Tappert, Fritz Wepper, Willy Schäfer, Helga Anders, Ellen Schwiers, Horst Buchholz, Rolf Becker, Karin Baal
| 74 | 9 | "Zeuge Yuroski" | 22 August 1980 |
Cast: Horst Tappert, Fritz Wepper, Willy Schäfer, Bernhard Wicki, Christiane Krüger, Christian Quadflieg
| 75 | 10 | "Eine unheimlich starke Persönlichkeit" | 19 September 1980 |
Cast: Horst Tappert, Fritz Wepper, Willy Schäfer, Anaid Iplicjian, Siegfried Wischnewski
| 76 | 11 | "Pricker" | 17 October 1980 |
Cast: Horst Tappert, Fritz Wepper, Willy Schäfer, Dirk Galuba, Ruth Drexel, Werner Schnitzer, Klaus Schwarzkopf, Carola Höhn, Anton Feichtner
| 77 | 12 | "Dem Mörder eine Kerze" | 21 November 1980 |
Cast: Horst Tappert, Fritz Wepper, Horst Frank, Sascha Hehn
| 78 | 13 | "Eine Rechnung geht nicht auf" | 12 December 1980 |
Cast: Horst Tappert, Fritz Wepper, Willy Schäfer, Lisa Kreuzer, Alice Treff, Thomas Schücke, Wolfgang Müller

=== Season 8 (1981) ===
| No. overall | No. in season | Title | Original release date |
|---|---|---|---|
| 79 | 1 | "Der Kanal" | 2 January 1981 |
Cast: Horst Tappert Fritz Wepper, Willy Schäfer, Bernd Herzsprung, Helga Anders, Monika Baumgartner
| 80 | 2 | "Am Abgrund" | 30 January 1981 |
Cast: Horst Tappert Fritz Wepper, Willy Schäfer, Klaus J. Behrendt, Lotte Ledl, Rainer Hunold, Anton Diffring, Thomas Schücke
| 81 | 3 | "Kein Garten Eden" | 13 March 1981 |
Cast: Horst Tappert Fritz Wepper, Willy Schäfer
| 82 | 4 | "Eine Ganz Alte Geschichte" | 27 March 1981 |
Cast: Horst Tappert, Fritz Wepper, Willy Schäfer, Mathieu Carrière, Verena Peter
| 83 | 5 | "Die Schwester" | 1 May 1981 |
Cast: Horst Tappert, Fritz Wepper, Willy Schäfer, Jutta Speidel, Ruth Drexel, Rudolf Wessely, Stephanie
| 84 | 6 | "Tod Eines Italieners" | 10 July 1981 |
Cast: Horst Tappert, Fritz Wepper, Willy Schäfer, Karin Baal, Klaus Herm, Peter Bertram, Werner Asam
| 85 | 7 | "Das sechste Streichholz" | 14 August 1981 |
Cast: Horst Tappert, Fritz Wepper, Willy Schäfer, Sissy Höfferer, Thomas Schücke, Jacques Breuer, Pierre Franckh, Robert Atzorn
| 86 | 8 | "Prozente" | 28 August 1981 |
Cast: Horst Tappert, Fritz Wepper, Willy Schäfer, Gerlinde Locker, Gerd Baltus, Barbara Rütting, Sunnyi Melles, Willy Semmelrogge, Martin Semmelrogge
| 87 | 9 | "Der Untermieter" | 9 October 1981 |
Cast: Horst Tappert, Fritz Wepper, Peter Kuiper, Lisa Kreuzer, Horst Sachtleben, Hans-Jürgen Schatz, Wilfried Klaus
| 88 | 10 | "Tod im See" | 6 November 1981 |
Cast: Horst Tappert, Fritz Wepper, Willy Schäfer, Christiane Krüger, Robert Atzorn
| 89 | 11 | "Die Stunde der Mörder" | 4 December 1981 |
Cast: Horst Tappert, Fritz Wepper, Willy Schäfer, Rudolf Fernau, Luitgard Im, Rolf Becker, Werner Asam

=== Season 9 (1982) ===
| No. overall | No. in season | Title | Original release date |
|---|---|---|---|
| 90 | 1 | "Eine Rose im Müll" | 22 January 1982 |
Cast: Horst Tappert, Fritz Wepper, Willy Schäfer, Diana Körner, Ulli Kinalzik
| 91 | 2 | "Eine Falle für Derrick" | 5 March 1982 |
Cast: Horst Tappert, Fritz Wepper, Willy Schäfer, Cornelia Froboess, Traugott Buhre, Werner Kreindl, Hans Georg Panczak, Rudolf Wessely
| 92 | 3 | "Nachts in einem fremden Haus" | 2 April 1982 |
Cast: Horst Tappert, Fritz Wepper, Willy Schäfer, Heinz Bennent, Susanne Beck
| 93 | 4 | "Die Fahrt nach Lindau" | 14 May 1982 |
Cast: Horst Tappert, Fritz Wepper, Willy Schäfer, Klausjürgen Wussow, Lotte Ledl, Ekkehardt Belle, Sissy Höfferer, Klaus Herm, Bruno Dallansky
| 94 | 5 | "Ein Fall für Harry" | 9 July 1982 |
Cast: Horst Tappert, Fritz Wepper, Willy Schäfer, Karl Lieffen, Ida Krottendorf, Irina Wanka, Hans Gruber, Sven-Eric Bechtolff
| 95 | 6 | "Das Alibi" | 20 August 1982 |
Cast: Horst Tappert, Fritz Wepper, Willy Schäfer, Dietlinde Turban, Ekkehardt Belle, Lambert Hamel, Karl-Heinz von Liebezeit, Robert Atzorn
| 96 | 7 | "Hausmusik" | 17 September 1982 |
Cast: Horst Tappert, Fritz Wepper, Willy Schäfer, Wolfgang Reichmann, Doris Schade, Sky Dumont, Dirk Galuba, Anton Feichtner
| 97 | 8 | "Der Mann aus Kiel" | 15 October 1982 |
Cast: Horst Tappert, Fritz Wepper, Willy Schäfer, Hans-Jürgen Schatz, Gudo Hoegel
| 98 | 9 | "Ein unheimliches Erlebnis" | 10 December 1982 |
Cast: Horst Tappert, Fritz Wepper, Claus Biederstaedt, Dieter Eppler

=== Season 10 (1983) ===
| No. overall | No. in season | Title | Original release date |
|---|---|---|---|
| 99 | 1 | "Via Genua" | 4 February 1983 |
Cast: Horst Tappert, Fritz Wepper, Willy Schäfer, Wolf Roth, Siegfried Rauch, Wilfried Klaus, Kurt Raab
| 100 | 2 | "Die Tote in der Isar" | 4 March 1983 |
Cast: Horst Tappert, Fritz Wepper, Willy Schäfer, Sonja Sutter, Christiane Krüger, Horst Frank, Horst Buchholz, Paul Dahlke
| 101 | 3 | "Geheimnisse einer Nacht" | 25 March 1983 |
Cast: Horst Tappert, Fritz Wepper, Willy Schäfer, Gila von Weitershausen, Heinz Bennent, Jürgen Goslar, Thekla Carola Wied, Christian Wolff, Siegfried Wischnewski
| 102 | 4 | "Der Täter schickte Blumen" | 29 April 1983 |
Cast: Horst Tappert, Fritz Wepper, Willy Schäfer, Ruth Leuwerik, Ernst Fritz Fürbringer, Jacques Breuer, Edwin Noël, Ursula Dirichs
| 103 | 5 | "Die kleine Ahrens" | 27 May 1983 |
Cast: Horst Tappert, Fritz Wepper, Willy Schäfer, Lisa Kreuzer
| 104 | 6 | "Tödliches Rendezvous" | 16 September 1983 |
Cast: Horst Tappert, Fritz Wepper, Willy Schäfer, Peter Ehrlich, Eva Kotthaus, Verena Peter, Thomas Schücke, Erik Schumann, Christian Berkel, Christiane Hammacher, Robinson Reichel
| 105 | 7 | "Lohmanns innerer Frieden" | 14 October 1983 |
Cast: Horst Tappert, Fritz Wepper, Martin Benrath, Christine Ostermayer, Sieghardt Rupp, Christiane Krüger, Hannes Messemer
| 106 | 8 | "Attentat auf Derrick" | 11 November 1983 |
Cast: Horst Tappert, Fritz Wepper, Willy Schäfer, Ida Krottendorf, Gerd Böckmann
| 107 | 9 | "Die Schrecken der Nacht" | 9 December 1983 |
Cast: Horst Tappert, Fritz Wepper, Willy Schäfer, Monika Baumgartner, Werner Asam
| 108 | 10 | "Dr. Römer und der Mann des Jahres" | 30 December 1983 |
Cast: Horst Tappert, Fritz Wepper, Willy Schäfer, Gisela Stein, Erich Hallhuber, Ernst Schröder

=== Season 11 (1984) ===
| No. overall | No. in season | Title | Original release date |
|---|---|---|---|
| 109 | 1 | "Das Mädchen in Jeans" | 20 January 1984 |
Cast: Horst Tappert, Fritz Wepper, Willy Schäfer, Alice Treff, Anja Jaenicke, Herbert Fleischmann, Anaid Iplicjian, Peter Capell
| 110 | 2 | "Die Verführung" | 20 February 1984 |
Cast: Horst Tappert, Fritz Wepper, Hans-Jürgen Schatz, Werner Stocker, Horst Kummeth, Henry Stolow
| 111 | 3 | "Manuels Pflegerin" | 2 March 1984 |
Cast: Horst Tappert, Fritz Wepper, Willy Schäfer, Susanne Uhlen, Carl Lange, Sascha Hehn
| 112 | 4 | "Drei atemlose Tage" | 30 March 1984 |
Cast: Horst Tappert, Fritz Wepper, Willy Schäfer, Ekkehardt Belle, Sky Dumont
| 113 | 5 | "Tödlicher Ausweg" | 27 April 1984 |
Cast: Horst Tappert, Fritz Wepper, Willy Schäfer, Pierre Franckh, Gila von Weitershausen, Olivia Pascal
| 114 | 6 | "Keine schöne Fahrt nach Rom" | 25 May 1984 |
Cast: Horst Tappert, Fritz Wepper, Willy Schäfer, Wolfgang Müller, Thomas Schücke, Heinz Reincke, Beate Finckh, Christiane Hammacher, Balduin Baas, Ulli Kinalzik
| 115 | 7 | "Ein Spiel mit dem Tod" | 15 June 1984 |
Cast: Horst Tappert, Fritz Wepper, Wolf Roth, Verena Peter, Rudolf Wessely, Edwin Noël
| 116 | 8 | "Ein Mörder zu wenig" | 20 July 1984 |
Cast: Horst Tappert, Fritz Wepper, Willy Schäfer, Karin Baal, Anton Feichtner
| 117 | 9 | "Angriff aus dem Dunkel" | 10 August 1984 |
Cast: Horst Tappert, Fritz Wepper, Willy Schäfer, Eva Kotthaus, Anton Diffring, Balduin Baas
| 118 | 10 | "Ende einer Sehnsucht" | 31 August 1984 |
Cast: Horst Tappert, Fritz Wepper, Willy Schäfer, András Fricsay
| 119 | 11 | "Gangster haben andere Spielregeln" | 21 September 1984 |
Cast: Horst Tappert, Fritz Wepper, Willy Schäfer, Hans Korte, Evelyn Opela, Klausjürgen Wussow, Jan Niklas, Sissy Höfferer
| 120 | 12 | "Das seltsame Leben des Herrn Richter" | 19 October 1984 |
Cast: Horst Tappert, Fritz Wepper, Willy Schäfer, Edwin Noël, Klaus Höhne, Peter Bertram, Christiane Hammacher
| 121 | 13 | "Der Klassenbeste" | 23 November 1984 |
Cast: Horst Tappert, Fritz Wepper, Dieter Eppler, Helga Anders
| 122 | 14 | "Stellen Sie sich vor, man hat Dr. Prestel erschossen" | 14 December 1984 |
Cast: Horst Tappert, Fritz Wepper, Willy Schäfer, Ursula Lingen, Armin Mueller-Stahl, Klaus Herm, Peer Augustinski, Verena Peter, Wilfried Klaus

=== Season 12 (1985) ===
| No. overall | No. in season | Title | Original release date |
|---|---|---|---|
| 123 | 1 | "Der Mann aus Antibes" | 18 January 1985 |
Cast: Horst Tappert, Fritz Wepper, Willy Schäfer, Christian Kohlund, Sky Dumont, Henry Stolow, Jochen Horst, Dieter Moebius
| 124 | 2 | "Gregs Trompete" | 8 February 1985 |
Cast: Horst Tappert, Fritz Wepper, Willy Schäfer, Ekkehardt Belle, Sieghardt Rupp, Pierre Franckh, Wolfgang Müller
| 125 | 3 | "Raskos Kinder" | 1 March 1985 |
Cast: Horst Tappert, Fritz Wepper, Anja Jaenicke, Peter Ehrlich, Lisa Kreuzer, Peter Kuiper, Henry Stolow
| 126 | 4 | "Toter Goldfisch" | 22 March 1985 |
Cast: Horst Tappert, Fritz Wepper, Willy Schäfer, Paul Hoffmann, Hans Georg Panczak, Gerd Böckmann
| 127 | 5 | "Wer erschoß Asmy?" | 19 April 1985 |
Cast: Horst Tappert, Fritz Wepper, Willy Schäfer, David Bennent, Werner Asam
| 128 | 6 | "Das tödliche Schweigen" | 3 May 1985 |
Cast: Horst Tappert, Fritz Wepper, Willy Schäfer, Jacques Breuer, Henry van Lyck, Ernst Fritz Fürbringer, Peter Bertram
| 129 | 7 | "Ein unheimlicher Abgang" | 17 May 1985 |
Cast: Horst Tappert, Fritz Wepper, Christiane Krüger, Christoph Eichhorn, Dirk Galuba, Lisa Kreuzer, Klaus Höhne
| 130 | 8 | "Schwester Hilde" | 14 June 1985 |
Cast: Horst Tappert, Fritz Wepper, Willy Schäfer, Inge Meysel, Susanne Uhlen, Ekkehardt Belle, Lis Verhoeven, András Fricsay
| 131 | 9 | "Lange Nacht für Derrick" | 28 June 1985 |
Cast: Horst Tappert, Fritz Wepper, Willy Schäfer, Klaus Schwarzkopf, Annemarie Düringer, Marion Kracht, Christian Kohlund, Horst Sachtleben
| 132 | 10 | "Kranzniederlegung" | 6 September 1985 |
Cast: Horst Tappert, Fritz Wepper, Willy Schäfer, Henry van Lyck
| 133 | 11 | "Tod eines jungen Mädchens" | 4 October 1985 |
Cast: Horst Tappert, Fritz Wepper, Willy Schäfer, Hans Korte, Claus Biederstaedt, Pierre Franckh, Peter Kuiper
| 134 | 12 | "Die Tänzerin" | 3 November 1985 |
Cast: Horst Tappert, Fritz Wepper, Willy Schäfer, Heinz Bennent, Ingrid Andree, Dietlinde Turban, Robert Jarczyk, Dieter Eppler
| 135 | 13 | "Familie im Feuer" | 13 December 1985 |
Cast: Horst Tappert, Fritz Wepper, Willy Schäfer, Beate Finckh, Ida Krottendorf, Henry van Lyck, Hans Georg Panczak, Dirk Galuba, Alice Treff

=== Season 13 (1986) ===
| No. overall | No. in season | Title | Original release date |
|---|---|---|---|
| 136 | 1 | "An einem Montagmorgen" | 3 January 1986 |
Cast: Horst Tappert, Fritz Wepper, Willy Schäfer, Christine Ostermayer, Jochen Horst, Dieter Moebius
| 137 | 2 | "Naujocks trauriges Ende" | 24 January 1986 |
Cast: Horst Tappert, Fritz Wepper, Willy Schäfer, Sissy Höfferer, Karl Heinz Vosgerau, Susi Nicoletti, Balduin Baas, Sascha Hehn
| 138 | 3 | "Geheimnis im Hochhaus" | 7 February 1986 |
Cast: Horst Tappert, Fritz Wepper, Willy Schäfer, Ekkehardt Belle, Traugott Buhre, Diana Körner, Gerd Baltus, Hans Peter Hallwachs, Bernd Herzsprung, Robert Jarczyk
| 139 | 4 | "Der Augenzeuge" | 4 April 1986 |
Cast: Horst Tappert, Fritz Wepper, Willy Schäfer, Klaus Herm, Sky Dumont, Ursula Karven, Kurt Weinzierl
| 140 | 5 | "Das absolute Ende" | 25 April 1986 |
Cast: Horst Tappert, Fritz Wepper, Willy Schäfer, Volkert Kraeft, Marion Kracht, Michael Heltau, Wolfgang Müller
| 141 | 6 | "Der Charme der Bahamas" | 16 May 1986 |
Cast: Horst Tappert, Fritz Wepper, Willy Schäfer, Evelyn Opela, Karl Michael Vogler, Irene Clarin, Thomas Fritsch, Richard Münch, Robert Jarczyk
| 142 | 7 | "Die Nacht, in der Ronda starb" | 4 July 1986 |
Cast: Horst Tappert, Fritz Wepper, Willy Schäfer, Klaus Schwarzkopf, Ursula Lingen, Christoph Eichhorn
| 143 | 8 | "Ein eiskalter Hund" | 25 July 1986 |
Cast: Horst Tappert, Fritz Wepper, Klaus Löwitsch, Christine Buchegger, Gundi Ellert, Ida Krottendorf
| 144 | 9 | "Der Fall Weidau" | 8 August 1986 |
Cast: Horst Tappert, Fritz Wepper, Willy Schäfer, Ekkehardt Belle, Christiane Hammacher, Ernst Fritz Fürbringer
| 145 | 10 | "Schonzeit für Mörder" | 22 August 1986 |
Cast: Horst Tappert, Fritz Wepper, Willy Schäfer, Horst Bollmann, Christoph Waltz, Lena Stolze, Volker Lechtenbrink, Horst Naumann
| 146 | 11 | "Die Rolle seines Lebens" | 3 October 1986 |
Cast: Horst Tappert, Fritz Wepper, Willy Schäfer, Sonja Sutter, Franz Böhm, Edwin Noël, Erich Hallhuber, Karl Heinz Vosgerau, Gerd Böckmann, Pierre Franckh, Peter Bertram, Dirk Galuba, Robert Jarczyk
| 147 | 12 | "Entlassen Sie diesen Mann nicht!" | 28 November 1986 |
Cast: Horst Tappert, Fritz Wepper, Willy Schäfer, Pinkas Braun, Wolf Roth, Paul Hoffmann

=== Season 14 (1987) ===
| No. overall | No. in season | Title | Original release date |
|---|---|---|---|
| 148 | 1 | "Mädchen in Angst" | 2 January 1987 |
Cast: Horst Tappert, Fritz Wepper, Willy Schäfer, Sona MacDonald, Joachim Bissmeier, Gisela Trowe, Henry van Lyck
| 149 | 2 | "Die Dame aus Amsterdam" | 30 January 1987 |
Cast: Horst Tappert, Fritz Wepper, Willy Schäfer, Ernst Jacobi, Raimund Harmstorf, Peter Bertram
| 150 | 3 | "Anruf in der Nacht" | 20 March 1987 |
Cast: Horst Tappert, Fritz Wepper, Willy Schäfer, Thomas Fritsch, Horst Sachtleben, Stefan Reck, Lotte Ledl, Paul Muller, Werner Abrolat, Robert Jarczyk, Ulli Kinalzik
| 151 | 4 | "Absoluter Wahnsinn" | 24 April 1987 |
Cast: Horst Tappert, Fritz Wepper, Willy Schäfer, Robert Atzorn, Horst Bollmann, Eva Kotthaus, Reinhard Glemnitz
| 152 | 5 | "Der Tote auf der Parkbank" | 5 June 1987 |
Cast: Horst Tappert, Fritz Wepper, Willy Schäfer, Ulrich Matthes, Ursula Karven
| 153 | 6 | "Die Nacht des Jaguars" | 19 June 1987 |
Cast: Horst Tappert, Fritz Wepper, Willy Schäfer, Hans Korte, Doris Schade, Volkert Kraeft, Christian Kohlund, Christiane Krüger, Ursula Buchfellner, Wilfried Klaus, Henry Stolow
| 154 | 7 | "Ein Weg in die Freiheit" | 3 July 1987 |
Cast: Horst Tappert, Fritz Wepper, Willy Schäfer, Christoph Eichhorn, Volker Lechtenbrink, Ben Becker, Henry van Lyck
| 155 | 8 | "Nachtstreife" | 18 September 1987 |
Cast: Horst Tappert, Fritz Wepper, Willy Schäfer, Anton Diffring
| 156 | 9 | "Koldaus letzte Reise" | 2 October 1987 |
Cast: Horst Tappert, Fritz Wepper, Willy Schäfer, Peter Ehrlich, Klaus Herm
| 157 | 10 | "Nur Ärger mit dem Mann aus Rom" | 30 October 1987 |
Cast: Horst Tappert, Fritz Wepper, Willy Schäfer, Sieghardt Rupp, Siegfried Rauch, Ursula Buchfellner, Hans Georg Panczak, Ute Christensen, Horst Sachtleben
| 158 | 11 | "Mordfall Goos" | 27 November 1987 |
Cast: Horst Tappert, Fritz Wepper, Martin Benrath, Irene Clarin, Robert Atzorn, Philipp Moog, Ruth Fischer

=== Season 15 (1988) ===
| No. overall | No. in season | Title | Original release date |
|---|---|---|---|
| 159 | 1 | "Fliegender Vogel" | 8 January 1988 |
Cast: Horst Tappert, Fritz Wepper, Christiane Hörbiger, Stefan Reck, Dana Vávrová
| 160 | 2 | "Mordträume" | 5 February 1988 |
Cast: Horst Tappert, Fritz Wepper, Mathieu Carrière, Robert Jarczyk
| 161 | 3 | "Eine Reihe von schönen Tagen" | 4 March 1988 |
Cast: Horst Tappert, Fritz Wepper, Willy Schäfer, Tobias Hoesl, Dieter Eppler
| 162 | 4 | "Kein Risiko" | 25 March 1988 |
Cast: Horst Tappert, Fritz Wepper, Willy Schäfer, Hannes Jaenicke, Irene Clarin, Klaus Schwarzkopf, Eleonore Weisgerber, Volkert Kraeft, Edwin Noël
| 163 | 5 | "Auf Motivsuche" | 22 April 1988 |
Cast: Horst Tappert, Fritz Wepper, Willy Schäfer, Beate Finckh, Rudolf Wessely, Pierre Franckh, Ute Christensen, Werner Schulenberg
| 164 | 6 | "Da läuft eine Riesensache" | 13 May 1988 |
Cast: Horst Tappert, Fritz Wepper, Willy Schäfer, Amadeus August, Sissy Höfferer, Hans Peter Hallwachs, Wilfried Klaus, Edda Seippel
| 165 | 7 | "Das Piräus-Abenteuer" | 1 July 1988 |
Cast: Horst Tappert, Fritz Wepper, Willy Schäfer, Ute Christensen, Henry van Lyck, Peter Bertram
| 166 | 8 | "Die Stimme" | 22 July 1988 |
Cast: Horst Tappert, Fritz Wepper, Ernst Jacobi, Christoph Eichhorn, Gerlinde Locker, Lambert Hamel, Sky Dumont, Thomas Rau, Peter Hart
| 167 | 9 | "Das Ende einer Illusion" | 12 August 1988 |
Cast: Horst Tappert, Fritz Wepper, Willy Schäfer, Cornelia Froboess, Gerd Anthoff, Hanno Pöschl, Marion Kracht
| 168 | 10 | "Mord inklusive" | 19 August 1988 |
Cast: Horst Tappert, Fritz Wepper, Philipp Moog, Beate Finckh, Christoph Waltz, Tobias Hoesl, Alice Treff, Ellen Frank
| 169 | 11 | "Die Mordsache Druse" | 21 October 1988 |
Cast: Horst Tappert, Fritz Wepper, Willy Schäfer, Jochen Horst, Robert Jarczyk, Dirk Galuba, Sky Dumont
| 170 | 12 | "Eine Art Mord" | 25 November 1988 |
Cast: Horst Tappert, Fritz Wepper, Siegfried Lowitz, Manfred Zapatka

=== Season 16 (1989) ===
| No. overall | No. in season | Title | Original release date |
|---|---|---|---|
| 171 | 1 | "Wie kriegen wir Bodetzki?" | 6 January 1989 |
Cast: Horst Tappert, Fritz Wepper, Willy Schäfer, Hans Putz, Hans Georg Panczak, Volker Lechtenbrink, Paul Hoffmann
| 172 | 2 | "Kisslers Mörder" | 27 January 1989 |
Cast: Horst Tappert, Fritz Wepper, Willy Schäfer, Evelyn Opela, Robinson Reichel
| 173 | 3 | "Der zweite Mord" | 24 February 1989 |
Cast: Horst Tappert, Fritz Wepper, Willy Schäfer, Philipp Moog, Stefan Wigger, Ursula Dirichs, Ulli Kinalzik
| 174 | 4 | "Blaue Rose" | 17 March 1989 |
Cast: Horst Tappert, Fritz Wepper, Willy Schäfer, Sissy Höfferer, Jochen Horst, Brigitte Mira, Werner Kreindl, Dieter Eppler, Peter Bertram, Werner Schulenberg, Hartmut Neugebauer
| 175 | 5 | "Die Stimme des Mörders" | 14 April 1989 |
Cast: Horst Tappert, Fritz Wepper, Willy Schäfer, Lena Stolze, Lotte Ledl, Ernst Hannawald, Uwe Friedrichsen, Hans Peter Hallwachs, Henry van Lyck, Werner Asam, Ludwig Haas
| 176 | 6 | "Rachefeldzug" | 5 May 1989 |
Cast: Horst Tappert, Fritz Wepper, Willy Schäfer, Marion Kracht, Dieter Eppler, Dieter Moebius, Robert Jarczyk, Robinson Reichel
| 177 | 7 | "Schrei in der Nacht" | 2 June 1989 |
Cast: Horst Tappert, Fritz Wepper, Willy Schäfer, Christine Buchegger, Svenja Pages, Klaus Herm, Reinhard Glemnitz
| 178 | 8 | "Die Kälte des Lebens" | 30 June 1989 |
Cast: Horst Tappert, Fritz Wepper, Willy Schäfer, Lotte Ledl, Winfried Glatzeder, Emilio De Marchi
| 179 | 9 | "Mozart und der Tod" | 29 September 1989 |
Cast: Horst Tappert, Fritz Wepper, Willy Schäfer, Heike Faber, Monika Baumgartner, Christoph Eichhorn, Hartmut Neugebauer
| 180 | 10 | "Ein kleiner Gauner" | 20 October 1989 |
Cast: Horst Tappert, Fritz Wepper, Willy Schäfer, Oliver Rohrbeck, Christiane Krüger, Alexander Kerst, Hans-Maria Darnov
| 181 | 11 | "Diebachs Frau" | 17 November 1989 |
Cast: Horst Tappert, Fritz Wepper, Willy Schäfer, Irene Clarin, Gerd Anthoff, Stefan Reck, Werner Schnitzer, Hanns Zischler
| 182 | 12 | "Ein merkwürdiger Tag auf dem Lande" | 15 December 1989 |
Cast: Horst Tappert, Fritz Wepper, Willy Schäfer, Martin Semmelrogge, Gerd Baltus, Erich Ludwig, Robert Jarczyk

=== Season 17 (1990) ===
| No. overall | No. in season | Title | Original release date |
|---|---|---|---|
| 183 | 1 | "Kein Ende in Wohlgefallen" | 5 January 1990 |
Cast: Horst Tappert, Fritz Wepper, Willy Schäfer, Michael Roll, Susanne Uhlen, Dirk Galuba, Gundis Zambo
| 184 | 2 | "Tödliches Patent" | 2 February 1990 |
Cast: Horst Tappert, Fritz Wepper, Willy Schäfer, Bernd Herzsprung, Karl Heinz Vosgerau
| 185 | 3 | "Judith" | 9 March 1990 |
Cast: Horst Tappert, Fritz Wepper, Willy Schäfer, Evelyn Opela, Svenja Pages, Walter Renneisen, Klaus Herm, Peter Kuiper
| 186 | 4 | "Tossners Ende" | 20 April 1990 |
Cast: Horst Tappert, Fritz Wepper, Willy Schäfer, Gila von Weitershausen, Thomas Fritsch
| 187 | 5 | "Höllensturz" | 25 May 1990 |
Cast: Horst Tappert, Fritz Wepper, Willy Schäfer, Wolf Roth, Philipp Moog, Jeannine Burch, Hanno Pöschl
| 188 | 6 | "Der Einzelgänger" | 8 June 1990 |
Cast: Horst Tappert, Fritz Wepper, Willy Schäfer, Heiner Lauterbach, Dirk Galuba, Peter Bertram, Katja Flint, Jennifer Nitsch
| 189 | 7 | "Des Menschen Feind" | 20 July 1990 |
Cast: Horst Tappert, Fritz Wepper, Willy Schäfer, Cornelia Froboess, Lisa Kreuzer
| 190 | 8 | "Tod am Waldrand" | 17 August 1990 |
Cast: Horst Tappert, Fritz Wepper, Willy Schäfer, Traugott Buhre, Stefan Reck, Rufus Beck, Horst Sachtleben
| 191 | 9 | "Abgrund der Gefühle" | 14 September 1990 |
Cast: Horst Tappert, Fritz Wepper, Willy Schäfer, Christian Kohlund, Christoph Eichhorn, Christian Berkel
| 192 | 10 | "Der Augenblick der Wahrheit" | 12 October 1990 |
Cast: Horst Tappert, Fritz Wepper, Willy Schäfer, Heike Faber, Jochen Horst, Walter Renneisen
| 193 | 11 | "Beziehung abgebrochen" | 9 November 1990 |
Cast: Horst Tappert, Fritz Wepper, Willy Schäfer, Evelyn Opela, Stefan Reck, Thomas Kretschmann, Michael Heltau, Dirk Galuba
| 194 | 12 | "Solo für Vier" | 14 December 1990 |
Cast: Horst Tappert, Fritz Wepper, Klaus Herm, Gisela Uhlen, Philipp Moog

=== Season 18 (1991) ===
| No. overall | No. in season | Title | Original release date |
|---|---|---|---|
| 195 | 1 | "Caprese in der Stadt" | 4 January 1991 |
Cast: Horst Tappert, Fritz Wepper, Gerd Anthoff, Edwin Noël, Wolf Roth, Hans Korte
| 196 | 2 | "Gefährlicher Weg durch die Nacht" | 1 February 1991 |
Cast: Horst Tappert, Fritz Wepper, Rufus Beck, Eva Kotthaus, Christian Berkel, Gerd Baltus
| 197 | 3 | "Das Penthaus" | 15 March 1991 |
Cast: Horst Tappert, Fritz Wepper, Christine Buchegger, Ernst Schröder, Rudolf Wessely
| 198 | 4 | "Wer bist du, Vater?" | 26 April 1991 |
Cast: Horst Tappert, Fritz Wepper, Ernst Hannawald, Sissy Höfferer, Ingrid van Bergen, Margit Carstensen
| 199 | 5 | "Verlorene Würde" | 31 May 1991 |
Cast: Horst Tappert, Fritz Wepper, Willy Schäfer, Peter Ehrlich, Ulrich Matthes
| 200 | 6 | "Offener Fall" | 28 June 1991 |
Cast: Horst Tappert, Fritz Wepper, Willy Schäfer, Edwin Noël
| 201 | 7 | "Der Tote spielt fast keine Rolle" | 19 July 1991 |
Cast: Horst Tappert, Fritz Wepper, Willy Schäfer, Michèle Marian, Klaus J. Behrendt, Peter Fricke, Jacques Breuer, Dieter Eppler
| 202 | 8 | "Störungen in der Lust zu leben" | 9 August 1991 |
Cast: Horst Tappert, Fritz Wepper, Richy Müller, Hanns Zischler, Horst Sachtleben
| 203 | 9 | "Ein Tod auf dem Hinterhof" | 20 September 1991 |
Cast: Horst Tappert, Fritz Wepper, Willy Schäfer, Hannelore Hoger, Christian Berkel, Jeannine Burch, Christian Kohlund
| 204 | 10 | "Der Schrei" | 18 October 1991 |
Cast: Horst Tappert, Fritz Wepper, Willy Schäfer, Wolf Roth, Rolf Zacher, Carin C. Tietze, Muriel Baumeister, Hans Georg Panczak
| 205 | 11 | "Das Lächeln des Dr. Bloch" | 29 November 1991 |
Cast: Horst Tappert, Fritz Wepper, Willy Schäfer, Evelyn Opela, Katharina Schubert, Kurt Weinzierl
| 206 | 12 | "Isoldes tote Freunde" | 20 December 1991 |
Cast: Horst Tappert, Fritz Wepper, Willy Schäfer, Juliane Rautenberg, Holger Handtke, Volkert Kraeft

=== Season 19 (1992) ===
| No. overall | No. in season | Title | Original release date |
|---|---|---|---|
| 207 | 1 | "Die Reise nach München" | 17 January 1992 |
Cast: Horst Tappert, Fritz Wepper, Willy Schäfer, Michael Roll, Stefan Wigger, Ursula Lingen
| 208 | 2 | "Ein seltsamer Ehrenmann" | 11 February 1992 |
Cast: Horst Tappert, Fritz Wepper, Willy Schäfer, Monica Bleibtreu, Philipp Moog, Henry van Lyck
| 209 | 3 | "Mord im Treppenhaus" | 20 March 1992 |
Cast: Horst Tappert, Fritz Wepper, Sonja Sutter, Gundis Zambo, Sky Dumont, Rüdiger Vogler, Harald Leipnitz, Holger Handtke
| 210 | 4 | "Die Festmenüs des Herrn Borgelt" | 24 April 1992 |
Cast: Horst Tappert, Fritz Wepper, Willy Schäfer, Ernst Schröder, Michèle Marian, Svenja Pages, Thomas Schücke, Ursula Karven, Hans Peter Hallwachs, Irene Clarin
| 211 | 5 | "Der stille Mord" | 22 May 1992 |
Cast: Horst Tappert, Fritz Wepper, Willy Schäfer, Sonja Sutter, Robinson Reichel, Gerd Baltus, Dirk Galuba, Robert Jarczyk, Sona MacDonald, Christiane Hammacher, Juliane Rautenberg
| 212 | 6 | "Beatrice und der Tod" | 19 June 1992 |
Cast: Horst Tappert, Fritz Wepper, Werner Schnitzer
| 213 | 7 | "Eine eiskalte Nummer" | 17 July 1992 |
Cast: Horst Tappert, Fritz Wepper, Willy Schäfer, Peter Fricke, Robert Jarczyk, Alexander Kerst, Ludwig Haas, Christiane Hammacher, Rolf Becker
| 214 | 8 | "Tage des Zorns" | 21 August 1992 |
Cast: Horst Tappert, Fritz Wepper, Klaus Grünberg, Krista Posch, Michael Tregor
| 215 | 9 | "Die Frau des Mörders" | 18 September 1992 |
Cast: Horst Tappert, Fritz Wepper, Christian Berkel, Bernhard Baier, Thekla Carola Wied, Gerd Baltus
| 216 | 10 | "Billies schöne, neue Welt" | 16 October 1992 |
Cast: Horst Tappert, Fritz Wepper, Willy Schäfer, Bernd Herzsprung, Sona MacDonald, Thomas Schücke, Muriel Baumeister, Lis Verhoeven
| 217 | 11 | "Ein merkwürdiger Privatdetektiv" | 13 November 1992 |
Cast: Horst Tappert, Fritz Wepper, Willy Schäfer, Peter Fricke, Heike Faber, Richy Müller, Tobias Hoesl, Anaid Iplicjian
| 218 | 12 | "Kein teurer Toter" | 11 December 1992 |
Cast: Horst Tappert, Fritz Wepper, Juliane Rautenberg, Sissy Höfferer, Hans-Maria Darnov

=== Season 20 (1993) ===
| No. overall | No. in season | Title | Original release date |
|---|---|---|---|
| 219 | 1 | "Ein sehr trauriger Vorgang" | 22 January 1993 |
Cast: Fritz Wepper, Willy Schäfer, Christiane Hörbiger, Holger Handtke, Robinson Reichel, Philipp Brammer
| 220 | 2 | "Mann im Regen" | 5 February 1993 |
Cast: Horst Tappert, Fritz Wepper, Willy Schäfer, Ulrich Matthes, Krista Posch, Hans Georg Panczak, Ingrid van Bergen, Hans Korte
| 221 | 3 | "Langsamer Walzer" | 5 March 1993 |
Cast: Horst Tappert, Fritz Wepper, Willy Schäfer, Anja Kling, Jennifer Nitsch, Gerd Baltus, Hannelore Hoger, Christiane Hammacher
| 222 | 4 | "Geschlossene Wände" | 16 April 1993 |
Cast: Horst Tappert, Fritz Wepper, Heiner Lauterbach, Hanns Zischler, Jeannine Burch, Erich Hallhuber, Gundis Zambo, Christoph Bantzer, Gerlinde Locker
| 223 | 5 | "Nach acht langen Jahren" | 7 May 1993 |
Cast: Horst Tappert, Fritz Wepper, Michael Gwisdek, Rosel Zech, Cornelia Froboess, Bernhard Baier
| 224 | 6 | "Die Lebensgefährtin" | 18 June 1993 |
Cast: Horst Tappert, Fritz Wepper, Willy Schäfer, Krista Posch, Christoph Bantzer, Philipp Moog, Christian Berkel
| 225 | 7 | "Die seltsame Sache Liebe" | 16 July 1993 |
Cast: Horst Tappert, Fritz Wepper, Willy Schäfer, Holger Handtke, Claus Biederstaedt, Diana Körner, Doris Schade, Juliane Rautenberg, Wolf Roth, Rudolf Wessely
| 226 | 8 | "Zwei Tage, zwei Nächte" | 6 August 1993 |
Cast: Horst Tappert, Fritz Wepper, Jacques Breuer, Katharina Schubert, Peter Ehrlich, Walter Renneisen
| 227 | 9 | "Nachtvorstellung" | 24 September 1993 |
Cast: Horst Tappert, Fritz Wepper, Willy Schäfer, Gerd Anthoff, Christoph Bantzer, Dirk Galuba, Philipp Brammer
| 228 | 10 | "Melodie des Todes" | 29 October 1993 |
Cast: Horst Tappert, Fritz Wepper, Willy Schäfer, Svenja Pages, Ursula Lingen, Irene Clarin
| 229 | 11 | "Die Nacht mit Ariane" | 26 November 1993 |
Cast: Horst Tappert, Fritz Wepper, Willy Schäfer, Philipp Brammer, Michael Zittel, Christian Berkel
| 230 | 12 | "Ein Objekt der Begierde" | 17 December 1993 |
Cast: Horst Tappert, Fritz Wepper, Hans Georg Panczak, Sky Dumont, Stefan Wigger, Jeannine Burch

=== Season 21 (1994) ===
| No. overall | No. in season | Title | Original release date |
|---|---|---|---|
| 231 | 1 | "Das Thema" | 7 January 1994 |
Cast: Horst Tappert, Fritz Wepper, Willy Schäfer, Jochen Horst, Irene Clarin, Richy Müller, Werner Schnitzer
| 232 | 2 | "Nachts, als sie nach Hause lief" | 4 February 1994 |
Cast: Horst Tappert, Fritz Wepper, Willy Schäfer, Karlheinz Hackl, Krista Posch, Christine Buchegger, Hans Georg Panczak, Hans Peter Hallwachs
| 233 | 3 | "Das Plädoyer" | 4 March 1994 |
Cast: Horst Tappert, Fritz Wepper, Klaus Herm, Lambert Hamel, Philipp Moog, Sona MacDonald
| 234 | 4 | "Ein sehr ehrenwerter Herr" | 22 April 1994 |
Cast: Horst Tappert, Fritz Wepper, Hanno Pöschl, Juliane Rautenberg, Walter Schmidinger, Edwin Noël, Dirk Galuba, Monika Baumgartner
| 235 | 5 | "Eine Endstation" | 27 May 1994 |
Cast: Horst Tappert, Fritz Wepper, Willy Schäfer, Will Quadflieg, Gerd Baltus, Hannelore Hoger, Sissy Höfferer, Christiane Krüger, Reinhard Glemnitz
| 236 | 6 | "Darf ich Ihnen meinen Mörder vorstellen?" | 24 June 1994 |
Cast: Horst Tappert, Fritz Wepper, Peter Kremer, Eleonore Weisgerber, Philipp Brammer, Joachim Bissmeier, Reinhard Glemnitz, Werner Asam
| 237 | 7 | "Gib dem Mörder nicht die Hand" | 8 July 1994 |
Cast: Horst Tappert, Fritz Wepper, Willy Schäfer, Wolf Roth, Hans Peter Hallwachs, Monika Baumgartner, Stefan Wigger, Irene Clarin, Karl Heinz Vosgerau
| 238 | 8 | "Gesicht hinter der Scheibe" | 5 August 1994 |
Cast: Horst Tappert, Fritz Wepper, Willy Schäfer, Klausjürgen Wussow, Evelyn Opela, Muriel Baumeister, Jacques Breuer, Dietrich Haugk, Philipp Moog, Winfried Glatzeder
| 239 | 9 | "Der Schlüssel" | 9 September 1994 |
Cast: Horst Tappert, Fritz Wepper, Willy Schäfer, Sunnyi Melles, Sky Dumont, Eva Kotthaus, Gundis Zambo, Pierre Franckh
| 240 | 10 | "Das Floß" | 7 October 1994 |
Cast: Horst Tappert, Fritz Wepper, Sona MacDonald, Christina Plate, Manfred Zapatka, Edwin Noël
| 241 | 11 | "Nachtgebete" | 4 November 1994 |
Cast: Horst Tappert, Fritz Wepper, Sissy Höfferer, Gerd Anthoff, Doris Schade, Hanno Pöschl, Robert Jarczyk
| 242 | 12 | "Abendessen mit Bruno" | 9 December 1994 |
Cast: Horst Tappert, Fritz Wepper, Sebastian Koch, Philipp Moog, Sona MacDonald, Marion Kracht, Thomas Schücke, Wolf Roth, Ernst Jacobi

=== Season 22 (1995) ===
| No. overall | No. in season | Title | Original release date |
|---|---|---|---|
| 243 | 1 | "Katze ohne Ohren" | 6 January 1995 |
Cast: Horst Tappert, Fritz Wepper, Willy Schäfer, Svenja Pages, Peter Kremer, Robinson Reichel, Karlheinz Hackl
| 244 | 2 | "Anruf aus Wien" | 3 February 1995 |
Cast: Horst Tappert, Fritz Wepper, Peter Fricke, Veronika Fitz, Klaus Höhne, Willy Schäfer
| 245 | 3 | "Ein Mord, zweiter Teil" | 24 March 1995 |
Cast: Horst Tappert, Fritz Wepper, Wolf Roth, Gudrun Landgrebe, Edwin Noël, Stefan Wigger
| 246 | 4 | "Teestunde mit einer Mörderin" | 28 April 1995 |
Cast: Horst Tappert, Fritz Wepper, Ursula Lingen, Thomas Kretschmann, Christina Plate
| 247 | 5 | "Ein Mord und lauter nette Leute" | 26 May 1995 |
Cast: Horst Tappert, Fritz Wepper, Klausjürgen Wussow, Sky Dumont, Christoph Eichhorn, Julia Dahmen, Christine Buchegger, Sona MacDonald, Christiane Hammacher, Klaus Herm
| 248 | 6 | "Kostloffs Thema" | 23 June 1995 |
Cast: Horst Tappert, Fritz Wepper, Gerd Anthoff, Nadine Neumann, Michael Tregor
| 249 | 7 | "Derricks toter Freund" | 14 July 1995 |
Cast: Horst Tappert, Fritz Wepper, Willy Schäfer, Christiane Hörbiger, Walter Renneisen, Peter Bertram
| 250 | 8 | "Eines Mannes Herz" | 18 August 1995 |
Cast: Horst Tappert, Fritz Wepper, Willy Schäfer, Sonja Sutter, Walter Schmidinger, Wolf Roth
| 251 | 9 | "Dein Bruder, der Mörder" | 8 September 1995 |
Cast: Horst Tappert, Fritz Wepper, Willy Schäfer, Holger Handtke, Eva Kotthaus, Kurt Weinzierl, Peter von Strombeck
| 252 | 10 | "Die Ungerührtheit der Mörder" | 6 October 1995 |
Cast: Horst Tappert, Fritz Wepper, Willy Schäfer, Marion Kracht, Wolf Roth
| 253 | 11 | "Herr Widanje träumt schlecht" | 17 November 1995 |
Cast: Horst Tappert, Fritz Wepper, Willy Schäfer, Gudrun Landgrebe, Eleonore Weisgerber, Henry van Lyck, Philipp Moog
| 254 | 12 | "Mitternachtssolo" | 15 December 1995 |
Cast: Horst Tappert, Fritz Wepper, Susanne Uhlen, Winfried Glatzeder, Michael Zittel, Peter Krüger

=== Season 23 (1996) ===
| No. overall | No. in season | Title | Original release date |
|---|---|---|---|
| 255 | 1 | "Die zweite Kugel" | 5 January 1996 |
Cast: Horst Tappert, Fritz Wepper, Dirk Galuba, Werner Asam, Lambert Hamel, Philipp Moog, Peter Bertram
| 256 | 2 | "Einen schönen Tag noch, Mörder" | 2 February 1996 |
Cast: Horst Tappert, Fritz Wepper, Volker Lechtenbrink, Stefan Wigger, Philipp Brammer
| 257 | 3 | "Ruth und die Mörderwelt" | 8 March 1996 |
Cast: Horst Tappert, Fritz Wepper, Peter Kuiper, Walter Renneisen, Lis Verhoeven
| 258 | 4 | "Frühstückt Babette mit einem Mörder?" | 5 April 1996 |
Cast: Horst Tappert, Fritz Wepper, Willy Schäfer, Christoph Bantzer, Michèle Marian, Anette Hellwig, Heidy Forster
| 259 | 5 | "Mädchen im Mondlicht" | 10 May 1996 |
Cast: Horst Tappert, Fritz Wepper, Diana Körner, Christine Buchegger, Henry van Lyck, Peter Bertram
| 260 | 6 | "Mordecho" | 21 June 1996 |
Cast: Horst Tappert, Fritz Wepper, Martin Benrath, Uwe Friedrichsen, Gunter Schoß, Werner Schnitzer, Manfred Zapatka, Kurt Weinzierl
| 261 | 7 | "Das leere Zimmer" | 12 July 1996 |
Cast: Horst Tappert, Fritz Wepper, Peter Bertram, Jeannine Burch, Hans Georg Panczak
| 262 | 8 | "Riekes trauriger Nachbar" | 9 August 1996 |
Cast: Horst Tappert, Fritz Wepper, Karl Lieffen, Michael Mertens
| 263 | 9 | "Der Verteidiger" | 6 September 1996 |
Cast: Horst Tappert, Fritz Wepper, Dirk Galuba, Philipp Moog, Walter Renneisen
| 264 | 10 | "Das dunkle Licht" | 11 October 1996 |
Cast: Horst Tappert, Fritz Wepper, Hans Peter Hallwachs, Anja Kling
| 265 | 11 | "Zeuge Karuhn" | 8 November 1996 |
Cast: Horst Tappert, Fritz Wepper, Christine Buchegger, Sky Dumont, Michael Heltau
| 266 | 12 | "Bleichröder ist tot" | 13 December 1996 |
Cast: Horst Tappert, Fritz Wepper, Pierre Franckh, Dominique Horwitz, Marion Kracht

=== Season 24 (1997) ===
| No. overall | No. in season | Title | Original release date |
|---|---|---|---|
| 267 | 1 | "Eine kleine rote Zahl" | 3 January 1997 |
Cast: Horst Tappert, Fritz Wepper, Willy Schäfer, Ulrich Matthes
| 268 | 2 | "Gegenüberstellung" | 31 January 1997 |
Cast: Horst Tappert, Fritz Wepper, Volker Lechtenbrink
| 269 | 3 | "Verlorener Platz" | 14 March 1997 |
Cast: Horst Tappert, Fritz Wepper, Christiane Hörbiger, Klausjürgen Wussow, Holger Handtke
| 270 | 4 | "Gesang der Nachtvögel" | 18 April 1997 |
Cast: Horst Tappert, Fritz Wepper, Jacques Breuer, Hans Peter Hallwachs, Michael Zittel
| 271 | 5 | "Fundsache Anja" | 23 May 1997 |
Cast: Horst Tappert, Fritz Wepper, Willy Schäfer, Katja Woywood, Irene Clarin
| 272 | 6 | "Hölle im Kopf" | 20 June 1997 |
Cast: Horst Tappert, Fritz Wepper, Willy Schäfer, Martin Benrath, Marion Kracht
| 273 | 7 | "Die Nächte des Kaplans" | 25 July 1997 |
Cast: Horst Tappert, Fritz Wepper, Willy Schäfer, Hanns Zischler, Horst Bollmann
| 274 | 8 | "Der Mord, der ein Irrtum war" | 17 October 1997 |
Cast: Horst Tappert, Fritz Wepper, Willy Schäfer, Katja Woywood, Gila von Weitershausen
| 275 | 9 | "Das erste aller Lieder" | 7 November 1997 |
Cast: Horst Tappert, Fritz Wepper, Philipp Moog, Stefan Wigger, Georg Preuße, Klaus Herm
| 276 | 10 | "Pornocchio" | 12 December 1997 |
Cast: Horst Tappert, Fritz Wepper, Dirk Galuba, Tobias Hoesl, Pierre Franckh

=== Season 25 (1998) ===
| No. overall | No. in season | Title | Original release date |
|---|---|---|---|
| 277 | 1 | "Die Tochter des Mörders ShortSummary = Cast: Horst Tappert, Fritz Wepper, Jeannine Burch, Gundi Ellert, Günther Kaufmann, Christian Kohlund, Werner Schnitzer, Theresa Scholze" | 23 January 1998 |
Walter König (Schnitzer), the owner of an Italian restaurant, receives demands for protection money, but refuses to pay. Mafia thug Johannes Dohna (Kohlund) is sent to give König a final warning, but in an altercation ends up killing him. He flees, and leaves his daughter Vera (Scholze) behind. When Derrick arrives at the suspect's apartment, he finds Vera there, and realizes she is the key to catching the murderer.
| 278 | 2 | "Anna Lakowski ShortSummary = Cast: Horst Tappert, Fritz Wepper, Willy Schäfer, Marion Kracht, Pierre Franckh, Klaus Höhne, Heidelinde Weis" | 6 March 1998 |
During a burglary, the owner of the apartment comes home unexpectedly, and is murdered. The cleaner, Anna Lakowski (Weis), arrives, and sees the face of one of the burglars as they flee. Undercover policeman Jakob Droste (Franckh) gets a lead on the murderers, and Lakowski is needed to identify the man she saw. Soon, however, it becomes clear that her infatuation for Derrick will be an impediment to the investigation.
| 279 | 3 | "Herr Kordes braucht eine Million ShortSummary = Cast: Horst Tappert, Fritz Wepper, Willy Schäfer, Lambert Hamel, Christiane Hammacher, Miguel Herz-Kestranek" | 17 April 1998 |
Herr Kordes (Hamel) risks losing his house if he cannot produce one million marks in ten days. He comes up with the plan of kidnapping the daughter of successful businessman Herr Heimeran (Herz-Kestranek). Heimeran decides to involve Derrick. The police set up a trap at the money transfer, but things do not go according to plan.
| 280 | 4 | "Mama Kaputtke ShortSummary = Cast: Horst Tappert, Fritz Wepper, Willy Schäfer, Sonja Sutter, Thomas Schücke, Volker Lechtenbrink, Wolf Roth, Susanne Uhlen, Werner Schnitzer, Henry van Lyck, Günther Kaufmann, Carolin Fink" | 1 May 1998 |
A hobby ornithologist, recording bird sounds, happens to record the sound of a girl being murdered. Derrick meets with the brother and sister of the deceased, Paul (Schücke) and Gabriele (Fink), and senses that they are hiding something. Shortly after, their mother (Sutter) arrives in town, and Derrick enlists her help to reveal the truth.
| 281 | 5 | "Das Abschiedsgeschenk ShortSummary = Cast: Horst Tappert, Fritz Wepper, Willy Schäfer, August Everding, Uwe Friedrichsen, Dirk Galuba, Günther Kaufmann, Karl Lieffen, Tobias Nath, Eleonore Weisgerber, Michael Ande, Markus Böttcher, Pierre Franckh, Helmut Ringelmann, Rolf Schimpf" | 16 October 1998 |
