= Willy Schäfer =

Willy Schäfer may refer to:

- Willy Schäfer (actor) (1933–2011), German television actor
- Willy Schäfer (handballer) (1913–1980), Swiss Olympic field handball player
