= Michèle Marian =

German actress (born 1963)

Michèle Marian (born 7 April 1963) is a German actress. She was born in East Berlin, East Germany.

== Selected filmography ==
- 1978: Bis dass der Tod euch scheidet
- 1979: Gelb ist nicht nur die Farbe der Sonne
- 1991: Derrick - Der Tote spielt fast keine Rolle
- 1991: Peter Strohm und die italienische Oper (TV-Serie)
- 1992: Derrick - Die Festmenüs des Herrn Borgelt
- 1992: Der Millionenerbe
- 1993: Lutz und Hardy
- 1994: Im Zweifel für...
- 1993-1996: Wie Pech und Schwefel
- 1996: Derrick - Frühstückt Babette mit einem Mörder?
- 1996: Napoleon Fritz
- 1997: Dr. Stefan Frank – Der Arzt, dem die Frauen vertrauen
- 1997-1999: Der Havelkaiser
- 1997-2000: Dr. Sommerfeld – Neues vom Bülowbogen
- 1998: Wie stark muß eine Liebe sein
- 2000: Ein Fall für zwei - Frühlings Erwachen
- 2000: Tatort - Totenmesse
- 2001: The Old Fox - Mord auf Bestellung
- 2002: The Old Fox - Es war Mord
- 2002: In aller Freundschaft
- 2002: Siska - Der Tode im Asphalt
- 2003: The Old Fox - Todfeinde
- 2003: Für alle Fälle Stefanie
- 2003: Im Namen des Herren
- 2003: The Old Fox - Plötzlich und unerwartet
- 2004: Siska - Schlangengrube
- 2004: Unser Charly
- 2004: Die Rosenheim-Cops
- 2004: Stubbe – Von Fall zu Fall - Nina
- 2004: Siska - Im Falle meines Todes
- 2005: Siska - Dunkler Wahn
- 2005–2007: Wege zum Glück
