= The Rider on the White Horse (1978 film) =

- Directed by: Alfred Weidenmann
- Based on: The Rider on the White Horse, novella by Theodor Storm
- Starring: John Phillip Law; Gert Fröbe
- Cinematography: Heinz Hölscher
- Edited by: Klaus Dudenhöfer
- Music by: Hans-Martin Majewski
- Release date: 1978
- Country: West Germany

The Rider on the White Horse (also known as Der Schimmelreiter) is 1978 German film directed by Alfred Weidenmann.

== Background ==
The film is the second of the three German film adaptations of The Rider on the White Horse by Theodor Storm. Weidenmann’s version is noted for its emphasis on issues of the time and its use of comparatively more fantasy features.

== Analysis ==
The Lexikon des Internationalen Films states that the film contains "atmospheric landscape shots" and that "the social conflict recedes in favor of the tragic love story, which Weidenmann extensively plays out." while the Große Personenlexikon des Films finds the film "staged in an overly banal manner."

== Cast ==
- John Phillip Law as Hauke Haien
- Gert Fröbe as Tede Volkerts
- Anita Ekström as Elke Haien
- Dirk Galuba as Ole Peters
- Vera Tschechowa as Vollina Harders
- Reinhard Kolldehoff as Jess Harders
- Lina Carstens as Trin Jans
- Werner Hinz as Amtmann in Husum
- Richard Lauffen as Jewe Manners
- Katharina Mayberg as Ann Grete
- Peter Kuiper

== See also ==
- The Rider on the White Horse (1934)
