= Der Havelkaiser =

- Starring: Günter Pfitzmann
- Country of origin: Germany

Der Havelkaiser is a German television series.

== Casts ==
- Günter Pfitzmann: Richard Kaiser
- Marion Kracht: Jette Kaiser
- Hansi Jochmann: Vera Plache
- Rolf Zacher: Eckhard „Ecki“ Plache
- Rainer Rudolph: Ulrich Kaiser
- Peter Sattmann: Ulrich Kaiser
- Helen Schneider: Hillary Kaiser
- Herbert Stass: Bruno Kaiser
- Rosemarie Fendel: Magda Kaiser
- Gunter Berger: Max Kaiser
- Franziska Bronnen: Therese Becker
- Renate Richter: Lotte Kuckuck
- Michèle Marian: Elisabeth Havemann
- Stephanie Philipp: Amelie Schimmelpfennig
- Jana Kozewa: Jutta Grabowsky
- Guntbert Warns: Benno Masur
- Franziska Bronnen: Therese Becker
- Walter Buschhoff: Arno
- Kim Müller: Benny Kaiser

== See also ==
- List of German television series
