= Alexander Zwo =

- Genre: Espionage
- Created by: Franz Peter Wirth; Oliver Storz
- Starring: Jean-Claude Bouillon; Marina Malfatti
- Composer: Horst Jankowski
- Country of origin: Germany
- Original language: German
- No. of seasons: 1
- No. of episodes: 6

Production
- Executive producer: Oliver Storz
- Camera setup: Gernot Roll; Joseph Vilsmaier
- Running time: 75

Original release
- Network: ARD, ORTF
- Release: November 25, 1972 – February 10, 1973

Alexander Zwo (literally translated "Alexander No. 2") is a German-French-Austrian-Italian television mini-series directed by Franz Peter Wirth.

== Synopsis ==
Mike Friedberg (Jean-Claude Bouillon) is a chemist in the United States. When his father dies in a car accident in Europe, Friedberg Jr. returns home in order to manage the inherited chemical plant in Munich. Soon he learns that this plant does important research for the NATO. Then, all of a sudden, attempts on his life are made. He is shot at and has a strange car accident, very similar to the one that killed his father. He scarcely survives an explosion in the laboratory but his employee Dr. Terbot (Renato Carmine) dies. On a train, a killer called Sonja (Marina Malfatti) attempts to kill him. She turns out being a Soviet-Russian secret agent and confuses him with her former lover, his twin brother Alexander. Mike understands that his twin brother, who disappeared when they were little children, is not dead. He pretends to be the double agent Alexander and seduces Sonja. She lets him get away but now another killer gets a contract on Mike. While Mike tries to prove that he is no agent, his twin brother wants the opposite. Alexander plans to fake his own death by having Mike killed so that he is safe and can enjoy his life with Sonja. The CIA seems to be eager to comply with that plan. Mike turns to the American Embassy but he is believed to be paranoid. Eventually, he asks the German MAD for protection. He is told he should try to fix things by returning to the United States but former friends pretend not to know him. In the end, his evil brother uses Sonja to contact Mike and to lure him into a deadly trap.

== Overview of all episodes ==
| № | Title | Air date |
|---|---|---|
| 1 | "Gefährliche Heimkehr" (Dangerous return home) | November 25, 1972 |
| 2 | "Zum Abschuss freigegeben" (Marked for death) | December 9, 1972 |
| 3 | "Das gestohlene Ich" (The stolen self) | December 23, 1972 |
| 4 | "Tote müssen nicht mehr sterben" (Dead people don't get killed another time) | January 6, 1973 |
| 5 | "Der Trumpf" (The joker) | January 27, 1973 |
| 6 | "Ping Pong" (Ping-pong) | February 10, 1973 |

== Cast ==
| Character | Actor | Episode |
|---|---|---|
| Mike Friedberg | Jean-Claude Bouillon | All |
| Sonja | Marina Malfatti | All |
| Dr. Seitz | Peter Fricke | 1 |
| Dr. Terborg | Renato de Carmine | 1 |
| Friedberg's solicitor | Peter Capell | 1 |
| Monsieur Voudier | Félix Marten | 2 |
| Mr Camden | Martin E. Brooks | 3 |
| Mr Wellbridge | Carl-Heinz Schroth | 3 |
| Nelly | Cheryl Ladd | 3 |
| Sarah Baxter | Nicole Heesters | 4 |
| Anthony Baxter | Peter Pasetti | 4 |
| Klaus Müller | Hansjörg Felmy | 5 |
| Maud | Charlotte Kerr | 5,6 |
