= Der Millionenerbe =

- Starring: Günter Pfitzmann; Evelyn Hamann
- Country of origin: Germany

Der Millionenerbe is a German television series.

== Casts ==
- Günter Pfitzmann: Johannes Redlich
- Gisela Trowe: Katharina Redlich
- Evelyn Hamann: Irene Rimbach
- Hans Hessling: Ludwig Rimbach
- Monika Peitsch: Veronica
- Friedrich W. Bauschulte: Jakob Stegmann
- Andreas Mannkopff: Uwe
- Stefan Gossler: Kalle
- Simon Jacombs: Philipp
- Ulli Kinalzik: Herr König

== See also ==
- List of German television series
