= Peter Kuiper =

German actor

- Born: Pieter Kuiper; 30 March 1929; Langsa, Aceh, (Netherlands) Dutch East Indies, now Indonesia
- Died: 28 September 2007 (aged 78); Berlin, Germany
- Height: 1.82 m (6 ft 0 in)
- Website: http://www.agentur-matthies.de/seite/schauspieler_detail.php?id=93

Peter Kuiper (30 March 1929 – 28 September 2007) was a German actor of film, theatre and television.

He died in Berlin from undisclosed causes in 2007.

== Filmography ==
Year	Title	Role	Notes
1959	A Doctor of Conviction	Toni	
1965	Manhattan Night of Murder	Bob	
1969	The Secret of Santa Vittoria	Sgt. Traub	
1971	The Eddie Chapman Story	Obersturmbannführer	TV film
1972	The Master Touch	Gustav	
1974	Around the World with Fanny Hill	Anthony Pomodori	
1975–1996	Derrick	Wirt Alex / Wirt / Albert Sussloff / Alwin Docker / Motellbesitzer / Walter Buschmann / Herr Minsch / Hugo Hase	7 episodes
1976	The Elixirs of the Devil	Kerkermeister	
1978	The Rider on the White Horse		
1979	Es begann bei Tiffany	Udo Kolonko	TV movie
1980	Berlin Alexanderplatz	Glatzkopf	4 episodes
1981	Collin	Professor Gerlinger	TV movie
1983	Non-Stop Trouble with Spies	Dimitri	
1983	Plem, Plem - Die Schule brennt		
1985	Otto – Der Film	Shark	
2007	Nothing Else Matters		
2007	Until Death	Old Gangster	(final film role)
