= Robinson Reichel =

German television actor (born 1966)

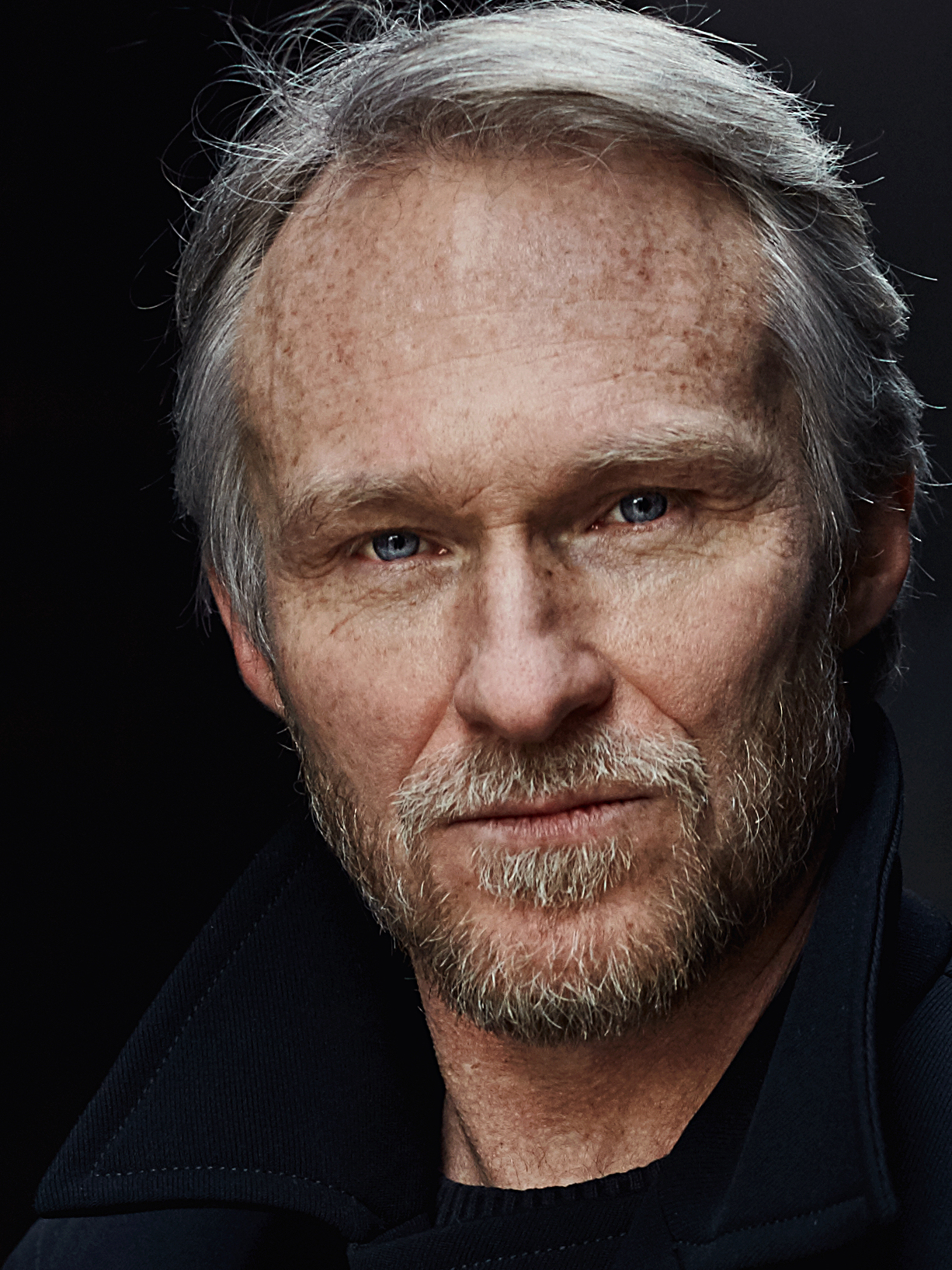
Robinson Reichel 2017 © Fabian Schellhorn l

Robinson Reichel (born 16 May 1966) is a German television actor.

== Selected filmography ==
- Derrick - Season 10, Episode 06: "Tödliches Rendezvous" (1983)
- Die Wächter (1986, TV miniseries), as Collins
- Night Train to Venice (1993), as Skinhead Udo
- The Hunt for the Hidden Relic (2002), as Roland
