= Klaus Herm =

German actor (1925–2014)

Klaus Herm (13 January 1925; Berlin, Germany – 24 May 2014) was a German television actor.

He started his career with several stage engagements, for example 18 years at Staatliche Schauspielbühnen Berlin.

== Selected filmography ==
- Derrick - Season 5, Episode 7: "Kaffee mit Beate" (1978, TV)
- Tod eines Schülers (1981, TV miniseries)
- Derrick - Season 8, Episode 6: "Tod eines Italieners" (1981, TV)
- Derrick - Season 9, Episode 4: "Die Fahrt nach Lindau" (1982, TV)
- Derrick - Season 10, Episode 4: "Der Augenzeuge" (1983, TV)
- Derrick - Season 11, Episode 14: "Stellen Sie sich vor, man hat Dr. Prestel erschossen" (1984, TV)
- Schwarz greift ein (1994–1999, TV series)
