= Krista Posch =

Italian-German television actress

- Born: Krista Posch; 10 January 1948 (age 77); Bolzano, Italy
- Website: http://www.krista-posch.de/

Krista Posch (10 January 1948 in Bolzano, Italy) is an Italian-German television actress.

== Awards ==
- 1983: Förderpreis für Literatur der Landeshauptstadt Düsseldorf in Northrhine-Westphalia
