= Christiane Hammacher =

German actress

Christiane Hammacher (born 1939 in Mannheim, Germany) is a German actress, who has performed on the German stage and on television.

== Life and career ==
In 2003, Hammacher married fellow actor Gunnar Möller, with whom she had performed in "Loriots Dramatische Werke" ("Loriot's Dramatic Works") at Frankfurt's Fritz Rémond Theater and on tour during the 1980s.

While performing in Mr. and Mrs. Nobel in Hamburg in 2015 and at the Fritz Rémond Theater in Frankfurt 2016, Hammacher played the role of Austrian pacifist Bertha von Suttner, the second woman to be named a Nobel laureate and the first woman to be awarded the Nobel Peace Prize.

Hammacher was preceded death by her husband, who died in Berlin in May 2017.

== Selected filmography ==
- Derrick - season 7, episode 5: "Ein tödlicher Preis" (1980)
- Derrick - season 10, episode 6: "Tödliches Rendezvous" (1983)
- Derrick - season 11, episode 6: "Keine schöne Fahrt nach Rom" (1984)
- Derrick - season 11, episode 12: "Das seltsame Leben des Herrn Richter" (1984)
