= Michael Tregor =

German television actor (born 1950)

- Born: 10 September 1950 (age 75); Santiago de Chile, Chile

Michael Tregor (born 10 September 1950 in Santiago de Chile, Chile) is a German television actor. He resides in Munich.

== Selected filmography ==
- 1977 - Tausend Lieder ohne Ton
- 1978 - The Pentecost Outing
- 1979 - Jauche und Levkojen (TV series)
- 1986 - Fotofinish
- 1988 - Three D
- 1992 - König Lear
- 1997 - Verdammtes Glück
- 2000 - Der tote Taucher im Wald
- 2004 - Platinum
- 2005 - Unter Verdacht - Das Karussell
