= Wilfried Klaus =

German actor

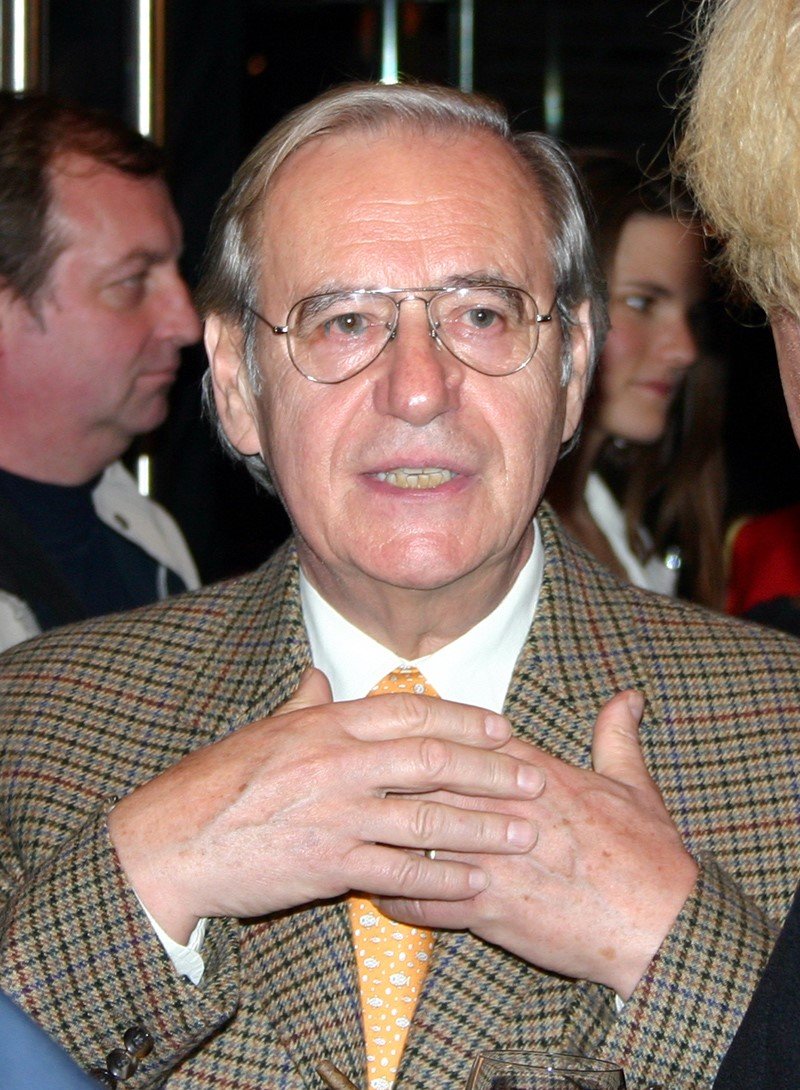
Wilfried Klaus

Wilfried Klaus is a German television actor best known for playing Kriminalhauptkommissar Horst Schickl in the police procedural SOKO München from 1978 to 2008.

== Selected filmography ==
- Lina Braake (1975)
- Derrick - Season 3, Episode 12: "Risiko" (1976)
- Plutonium (1978, TV film)
- Jauche und Levkojen (1978, TV series)
- Derrick - Season 5, Episode 13: "Abitur" (1978)
- Derrick - Season 8, Episode 9: "Der Untermieter" (1981)
- Doctor Faustus (1982)
- Derrick - Season 11, Episode 14: "Stellen Sie sich vor, man hat Dr. Prestel erschossen" (1984)
- Derrick - Season 15, Episode 6: "Da läuft eine Riesensache" (1988)
