= Monika Baumgartner =

German actress and theater director

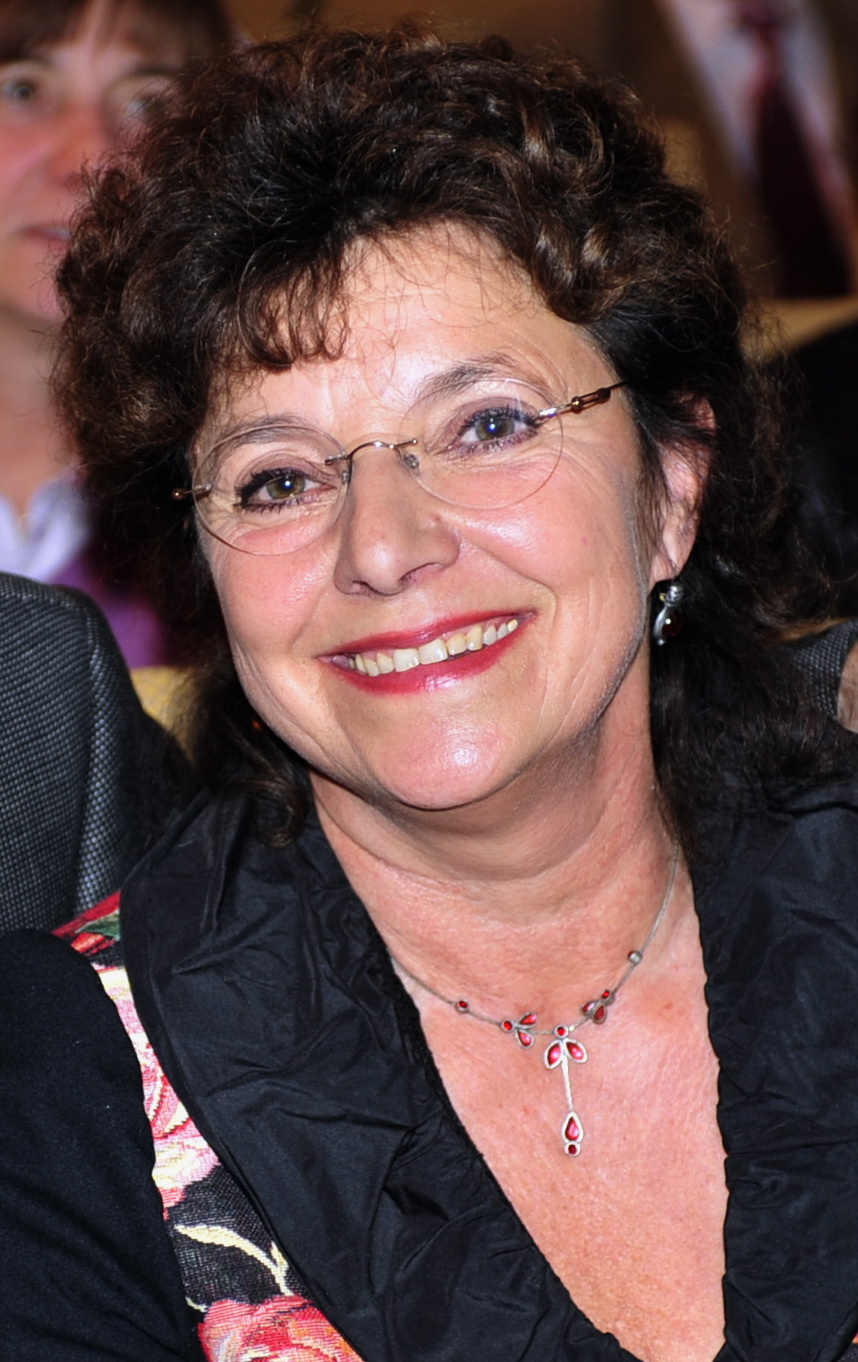
- Born: 19 July 1951 (age 73); Munich, West Germany
- Occupation(s): Actress, theatre director

Monika Baumgartner (born 19 July 1951) is a German television actress and theatre director. In her roles, she usually plays typical characters from Bavaria.

== Biography ==
Born in Munich, Bavaria, Baumgartner studied at Otto-Falckenberg-Schule, a theatre academy in Munich, after which she took theatre roles in Mannheim and Hamburg and minor roles in TV shows.

Her breakthrough came in 1981 when she starred in Die Rumplhanni, a TV film, where she played the main role by the same name. She is also remembered for playing several roles in Derrick.

Baumgartner was awarded the Bayerischer Fernsehpreis (a Bavarian TV award) for her appearance in "Sau sticht". In 1998, she directed for the first time in "Die Ehrabschneider".

Baumgartner teaches at the Bayerische Theaterakademie August Everding, regularly appears on stage in Munich and runs an interior design store with her sister.

== Selected filmography ==
- Derrick - season 10, episode 09: "Die Schrecken der Nacht" (1983)
- Derrick - season 08, episode 02: "Der Kanal" (1981)
- Derrick - season 07, episode 05: "Ein tödlicher Preis" (1980)
- Derrick - season 05, episode 12: "Ute und Manuela" (1978)
- Der Bergdoktor - since 2008
