= Eleonore Weisgerber =

German television actress and chansonnier (born 1947)

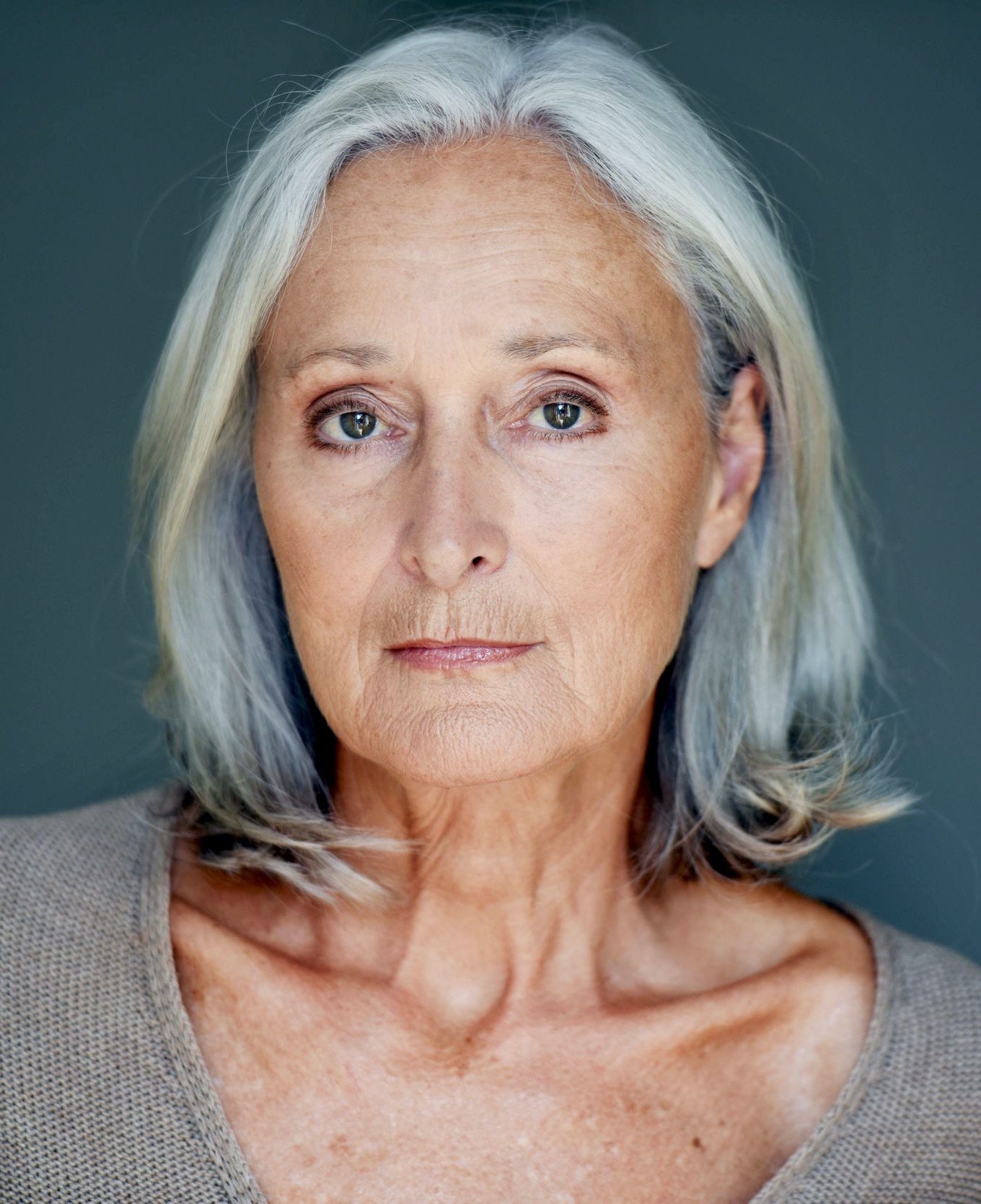
- Born: Eleonore Weisgerber; August 18, 1947 (age 78); Wiesbaden, Germany
- Website: https://web.archive.org/web/20070306063944/http://www.charade-agentur.com/female/weisgerber.htm

Eleonore Weisgerber (born August 18, 1947) is a German television actress. She established a foundation to help research for the treatment of bipolar disorder.

== Life and career ==
During a 2013 interview with Die Welt for the article, "Wenn große TV-Stars in die Altersarmut rutschen" ("When big TV stars slip into old age poverty"), she announced that she was involved in litigation regarding her actor's pension. Stating that she had been "bitterly disappointed" to learn how small her pension would be when she reached retirement age, she criticized the system's unfairness, noting that German television actors had historically been credited only for their days of filming when, in reality, they were expected to perform five days of related work, learning lines and developing their roles, participating costume and mask rehearsals, providing dubbing, and making media relations appearances, as well as filming.

During the spring of 2018, Weisgerber was involved in filming the NDR television film, Armer Irrer (Poor Irrer).

== Selected filmography ==
- Bel Ami (1968, TV film)
- Derrick - Season 2, Episode 2 "Tod am Bahngleis" (1975, TV)
- Pilots (1995)
- Living in Fear (1997, TV film)
- At Fifty Men Kiss Differently (1999, TV film)
- Inspektor Rolle (2002–2004, TV series)
- Ninja Assassin (2009), as Mrs. Sabatin
- Gravity (2009)
- Hut in the Woods (2011)
