= Jeannine Burch =

Swiss actress (born 1968)

- Born: Jeannine Burch; 19 January 1968 (age 58); Zürich, Switzerland
- Website: http://www.proact-agentur.de

Jeannine Burch (born 19 January 1968 in Zürich, Switzerland) is a Swiss television actress. Currently she lives in Düsseldorf, Germany.

== Selected filmography ==
- 1997: Pretty Babe
- 1990: Der Strohmann
- 1990: Der doppelte Nötzli
- 1991: The Tango Player
