= Werner Schnitzer =

German television actor (born 1942)

- Born: January 9, 1942 (age 84); Donauwörth, Germany
- Website: 195.185.214.166/zbf/DisplayKuenstler.do?kuenstlerID=6509&recordStatistics=1

Werner Schnitzer (born January 9, 1942, in Donauwörth, Germany) is a German television actor.

== Selected filmography ==
- Derrick - Season 2, Episode 10: "Kamillas junger Freund" (1975)
- Derrick - Season 7, Episode 11: "Pricker" (1980)
