= Christine Ostermayer =

Austrian actress

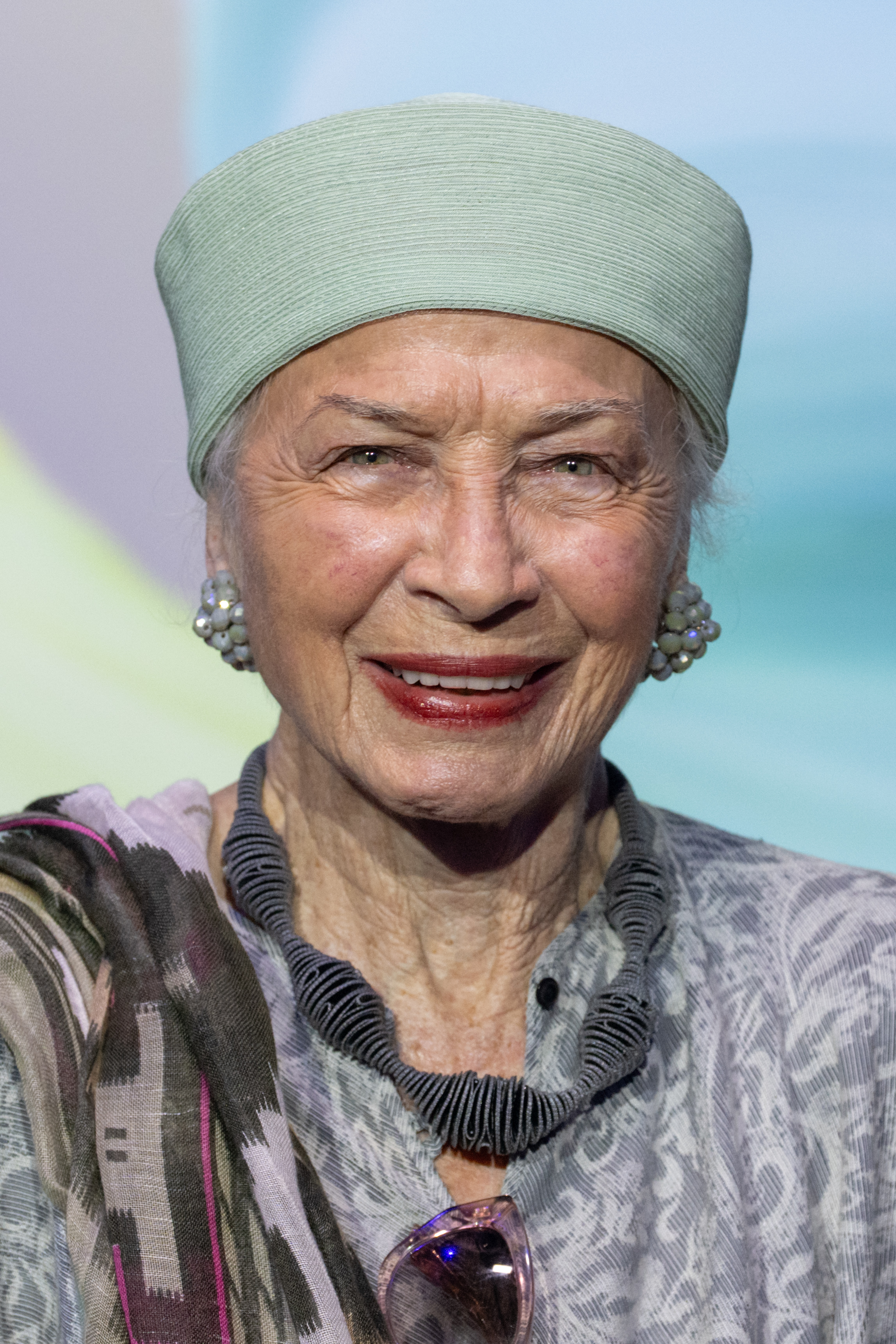
Christine Ostermayer (2025)

Christine Ostermayer (born 15 December 1936 in Vienna) is an Austrian actress.

== Selected filmography ==
- Derrick - Season 10, Episode 07: "Lohmanns innerer Frieden" (1983)
