= Beate Finckh =

German actress (born 1960)

- Born: 22 April 1960 (age 65); Neukölln, West Berlin, West Germany
- Occupation: Actress
- Years active: 1976–present

Beate Finckh (born 22 April 1960) is a German actress.

== Selected filmography ==
- Desperado City (1980), as Liane
- Die Knapp-Familie (1981–1983, TV series), as Elisabeth Knapp
- Der Tod in der Waschstraße (1982), as Jutta
- Treffer (1984), as Mira
- Ich oder du (1984), as Christina
- Parker (1984), as Sister
- Kaminsky (1985), as Renate Schuler
- Of Pure Blood (1986), as Marta
- Wahnfried (1986), as Elisabeth Nietzsche
- Jokehnen (1987, TV miniseries), as Ilse Aschmoneit
