= Eva Kotthaus =

German actress (1932–2020)

- Born: Eva Anna Kotthaus; 19 May 1932; Düsseldorf, Rhine, Prussia, Germany
- Died: 22 April 2020 (aged 87); Germany
- Years active: 1954-2000
- Website: http://195.185.214.166/zbf/DisplayKuenstler.do?kuenstlerID=2082&recordStatistics=1

Eva Anna Kotthaus (19 May 1932 in Düsseldorf, Rhine, Prussia, Germany – 22 April 2020) was a German actress.

== Filmography ==
- 1954: Kein Hüsung - Marieken
- 1955: Der Teufel vom Mühlenberg - Anne
- 1955: Sky Without Stars - Anna Kaminski
- 1956: Love - Monika Ballard
- 1957: Glücksritter (A Modern Story) - Elisabeth Becker
- 1957: A Farewell to Arms - Delivery Room Nurse
- 1958: Jahrgang 21 - Käthe
- 1959: The Nun's Story - Sister Marie (Sanatorium)
- 1960: Ein Herz braucht Liebe
- 1963: Der Sittlichkeitsverbrecher - Betti Egger
- 1965: Der neue Mann (TV Movie) - Joan Lanier
- 1972: Anna und Totò (TV Movie)
- 1972: Jugend einer Studienrätin (TV Movie) - Elisabeth Lewejohann
- 1978-1995: Derrick (TV Series) - Liane Basler / Hanna Labö / Martha Hauke / Frau Mertens / Frau Scherer / Rose Hagemann / Frau Schlör / Frau Golz
- 1983: Randale - Old Teacher (uncredited)
- 1983: Der Tunnel (TV Movie) - Frau Dürlinger
- 1988: Land der Väter, Land der Söhne - Maximiliane Kleinert
- 1991: Der Goldene Schnitt (TV Movie)
- 1994: Anna Maria – Eine Frau geht ihren Weg (TV Series) - Christine Bogner
