= Wolfgang Müller (actor) =

German actor (born 1953)

Wolfgang Müller (born 10 August 1953 in Cologne, West Germany) is a German television actor.
He played several roles in the very popular TV series Derrick.

== Selected filmography ==
Year	Title	Role	Notes
1976–1986	Derrick	Hans Mahler; Hamann; Achim Moldau; Michael Bruhn; Achim Breiteck; Alex Schech	7 episodes
1977	Schulmädchen-Report. 11. Teil: Probieren geht über Studieren	Richie	Uncredited
1981	After Midnight	Paul	Uncredited
1983	For Those I Loved	Mokotow	
1985	Eine Frau für gewisse Stunden	Hinrich Reuter	Also director
1991	Scream of Stone		
1992	Shining Through	Bus Conductor	
2000	X-Men	German Soldier #3	
2006	Tristan & Isolde	Rothgar	
2010	Sumarlandið		
