= Stefan Wigger =

German actor (1932–2013)

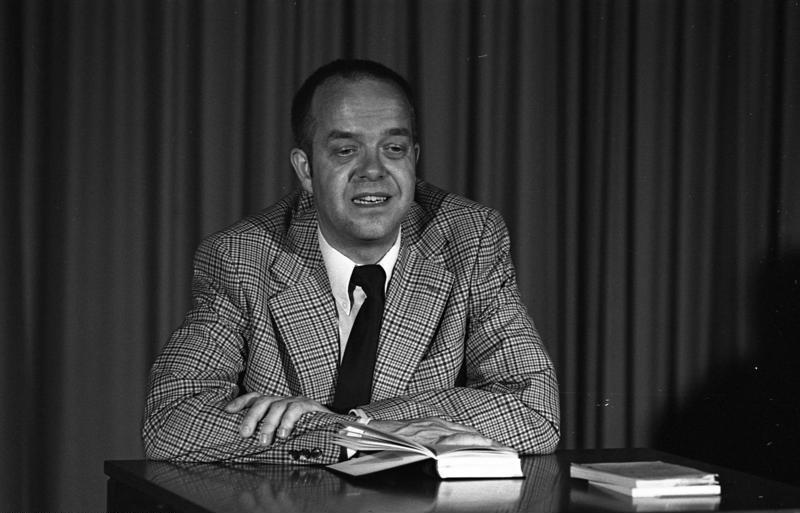
Stefan Wigger, 1973

Stefan Wigger (26 March 1932 in Leipzig, Germany- 13 February 2013 in Munich) was a German television actor.

== Selected filmography ==
- Life Begins at Eight (1962)
- The Threepenny Opera (1963)
- I Am Looking for a Man (1966)
- Hocuspocus (1966)
