= Ute Christensen =

German actress (born 1955)

Ute Christensen (born 21 December 1955 in Neubrandenburg, East Germany) is a German actress.

== Selected filmography ==
- 1980: Derrick - Season 7, Episode 1: "Hanna, liebe Hanna" (TV)
- 1980: Nirgendwo ist Poenichen (TV series)
- 1981: Tod eines Schülers (TV miniseries)
- 1981: Berlin Tunnel 21 (TV film)
- 1983: Ich heirate eine Familie (TV series)
- 1986: Liebling Kreuzberg (TV series)
- 1988: Pan Tau - Der Film
- 1994: The Dragon Ring (TV miniseries)
