= Heike Faber =

German television actress

- Born: Heike Faber; 5 May 1965 (age 60); West Berlin, West Germany
- Website: http://www.heikefaber.de/Heike%20Faber.htm

Heike Faber (born 5 May 1965 in West Berlin, West Germany) is a German television actress.

== Selected filmography ==
- The Golden Cage (1986)
- Eine Reise nach Deutschland (1987)
- Letzten Sommer in Kreuzberg (1990)
