= Klaus Höhne =

German actor

Klaus Höhne (13 June 1927 in Hamburg – 21 August 2006 in Murnau am Staffelsee) was a German actor. From 1971 until 1979 he starred in the Hessischer Rundfunk version of the popular television crime series Tatort. In 1974 he appeared in the very first episode of the popular TV series Derrick called "Waldweg".

== Filmography ==
Year	Title	Role	Notes
1960	Agatha, Stop That Murdering!		
1966	Count Bobby, The Terror of The Wild West	Gangster	Voice, Uncredited
1967	Wilder Reiter GmbH	Amann	
1968	Die goldene Pille	Berner	
1968	Vier Stunden von Elbe 1	Gustav Andresen	TV film
1969	The Damned	1st S.A. Officer	
1974	Eintausend Milliarden	Krull	TV film
1974-1998	Derrick	Sorpe / Kriminaldirektor / Prokurist Heffner / Dr. Kuhn / Ewald Stenger / Herr Dirks	TV series, 10 episodes
1977	Lady Dracula	Herr Hubert	
1979	Drei Bürger zum Geburtstag		TV film
1982	Shalom Pharao	Juda	Voice
1983	The Roaring Fifties	Colonel Hobson	
1984	Man Under Suspicion	Presiding Magistrate	
1984	What's Up, Chancellor?	Ehrlichmann	
