= Svenja Pages =

German actress

- Born: Svenja Pages; August 3, 1966 (age 60); Rheydt, Germany
- Website: http://www.profiler-agentur.de/index_vita.htm?actors/navigation_m.php&actors/vita_actors.php?job=actress&id_actor=33

Svenja Pages (born August 3, 1966 in Rheydt, Germany) is a German television actress.

== Filmography ==
- Diese Drombuschs (1986)
- Ein Fall für zwei (1988)
- Derrick (1989)
- Jede Menge Schmidt (1989)
- Drunter und drüber (1990)
- Anwalt Abel (1990)
- Einer für alle (1991)
- Immer wieder Sonntag (1993)
- Hallo, Onkel Doc! (1994)
- Freunde fürs Leben (1994)
- Die Kommissarin (1994)
- Der Fahnder (1996)
- Und morgen fängt das Leben an (1996)
- Die Cleveren (1998)
- Siska (1998)
- Die Männer vom K3 - Liebestest (1998)
- Tatort - Auf dem Kriegspfad (1999)
- Ein unmöglicher Mann (2001, TV miniseries)
- Drei mit Herz (2002)
- Flamenco der Liebe (2002)
- Utta Danella - Die andere Eva (2003)
