= Dirk Galuba =

German actor

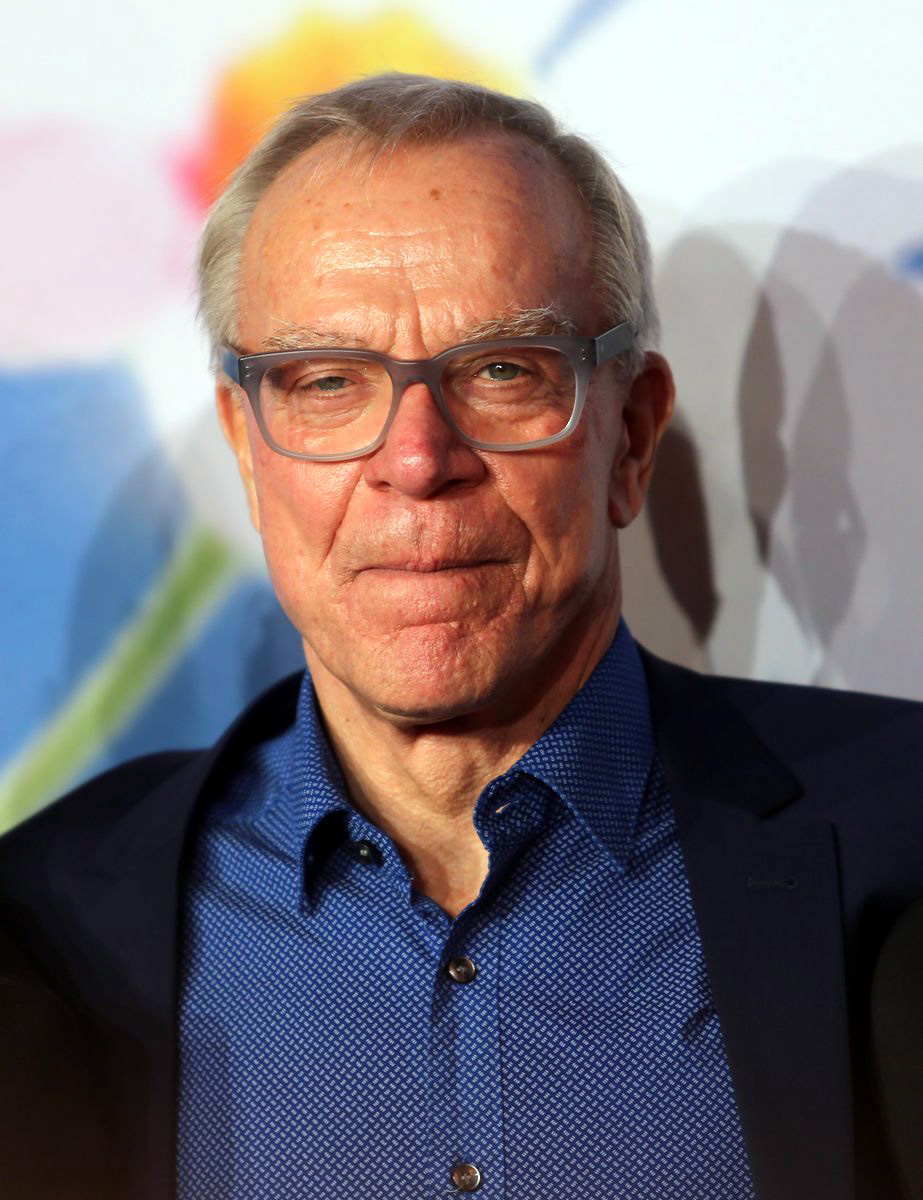
- Galuba in 2015
- Born: 28 August 1940 (age 85); Schneidemühl, Germany
- Website: http://www.mr-management.de/index.php?page=showactor&xid=27

Dirk Galuba (born 28 August 1940 in Schneidemühl) is a German television actor.

== Selected filmography ==
- 1972: Tears of Blood
- 1976: Derrick - Season 3, Episode 5: "Schock"
- 1976: Anita Drögemöller und die Ruhe an der Ruhr
- 1977: Derrick - Season 4, Episode 9: "Inkasso"
- 1978: The Rider on the White Horse
- 1979: Derrick - Season 6, Episode 6: "Tandem"
- 1979: Derrick - Season 6, Episode 9: "Ein Kongreß in Berlin"
- 1980: Derrick - Season 7, Episode 11: "Pricker"
- 1981: Lili Marleen
- 1982: Derrick - Season 9, Episode 7: "Hausmusik"
- 1985: Derrick - Season 12, Episode 7: "Ein unheimlicher Abgang"
- 1999/2001: Die Rote Meile (TV series)
- 2001: Band of Brothers (TV series)
- 2003: Rosamunde Pilcher: Paradies der Träume (TV episode)
- 2005: Sturm der Liebe (TV series)
- 2006: The Cloud
