= Hans-Jürgen Schatz =

German television actor (born 1958)

- Born: October 10, 1958 (age 67); West Berlin, West Germany
- Website: http://www.hans-juergen-schatz.de/

Hans-Jürgen Schatz (born October 10, 1958 in West Berlin, West Germany) is a German television actor.

== Awards and honors ==
- 2007 Bundesverdienstkreuz am Bande (Federal Cross of Merit)

== Filmography ==
- Breakthrough, 1979
- Lulu, 1980
- Die Weiße Rose, 1982
- Derrick - Season 08, Episode 09: "Der Untermieter" (1981)
- Derrick - Season 09, Episode 08: "Der Mann aus Kiel" (1982)
- Derrick - Season 11, Episode 02: "Die Verführung" (1984)
- Ein Fall für zwei, 1984
- Der Fahnder, 1985–1993
- The Rose Garden, 1989
- Salto Postale, 1993
- Immenhof, 1994
- Halali, 1995
- Bombs Under Berlin, 1999
- Wolffs Revier, 1992, 2002
