= Tobias Nath =

German voice actor

Tobias Nath (born 1979 in Bochum, Germany) is a German voice actor. He is married to Rubina Kuraoka.

== Dubbing roles (excerpt) ==
- Eddie Redmayne (as Balem Abrasax) in Jupiter Ascending
- Michael Cyril Creighton (as Jake) in The Post

== Audiobooks ==
- 2017: Captain Underpants: Großangriff der schnappenden Klo-Schüsseln ... und noch ein Abenteuer, der Hörverlag, ISBN 978-3-8445-2090-3
