= Irene Clarin =

German television and theatre actress

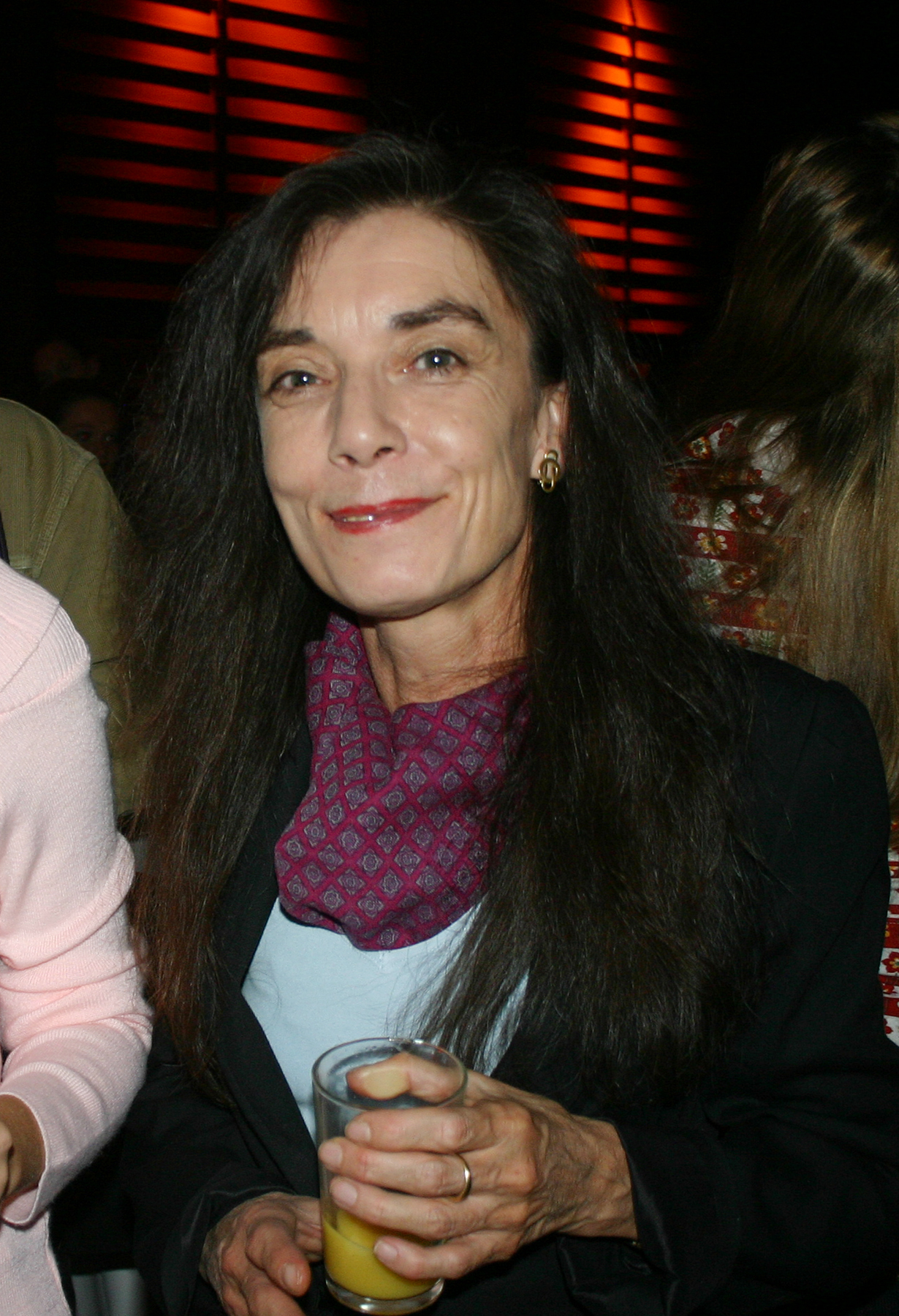
- Irene Clarin in 2006
- Born: Irene Clarin; 16 May 1955 (age 70); Munich, West Germany
- Website: http://www.agenturdorismattes.de/detail.php3?actor=200

Irene Clarin (born 16 May 1955 in Munich, Germany) is a German television and theatre actress.

== Selected filmography ==
- 2006 Siska - Alibi für Tommi (TV movie)
- 2005 Siska - Das Gewissen des Mörders (TV movie)
- 2005 Siska - Keine andere Wahl (TV movie)
- 2004 Siska - Einfach nur sterben (TV movie)
- 2004 Die Hengstpararade
- 2004 Die Rosenheim-Cops (TV movie)
- 2004 Schlosshotel Orth (TV movie)
- 2002 Siska - Hass macht blind (TV movie)
- 1977-2002 a lot of Derrick and The Old Fox episodes
- 1989-1990 Pfarrerin Lenau (TV movie)
- 1982-1987 Die Wiesingers (TV movie), as Therese Wiesinger
