= Gudo Hoegel =

German actor (born 1948)

Gudo Hoegel (born 1 April 1948) is a German actor who specializes in dubbing.

Hoegel made his television debut in 1977 series Auf der Suche nach dem Glück. Main roles in shows such as Mond, Mond, Mond followed, as well as several appearances in television dramas such as Direktmandat and Datenpanne and guest appearances in Wolffs Revier, The Black Forest Clinic, and Irgendwie und Sowieso. He also plays Hausbesitzer Fritsch in Hausmeister Krause – Ordnung muss sein.

Hoegel is best known for his voice work. He has dubbed over, among others, Scott Bakula as Captain Jonathan Archer in Star Trek: Enterprise, Richard Karn as Al Borland in Home Improvement, and Michael O'Keefe as Fred in Roseanne. Hoegel also dubbed over Mike Myers as Doctor Evil in the films Austin Powers: International Man of Mystery and Austin Powers: The Spy Who Shagged Me. More recently, Hoegel dubbed over Timothy Spall as Peter Pettigrew in the Harry Potter series.

== Selected filmography ==
- Derrick - Season 6, Episode 10: "Das dritte Opfer" (1979)
- Derrick - Season 9, Episode 8: "Der Mann aus Kiel" (1982)
