= Verena Peter =

German actress

- Born: Verena Peter; 1954 (age 71–72)
- Website: http://195.185.214.166/zbf/DisplayKuenstler.do?kuenstlerID=5283&recordStatistics=1

Verena Peter (born 1954) is a German actress. She played several roles in the popular TV series Derrick.

== Selected filmography ==
- Derrick - Season 7, Episode 7: "Der Tod sucht Abonnenten" (1980)
- Derrick - Season 8, Episode 4: "Eine ganz alte Geschichte" (1981)
- Derrick - Season 10, Episode 6: "Tödliches Rendezvous" (1983)
- Derrick - Season 11, Episode 7: "Ein Spiel mit dem Tod" (1984)
- Derrick - Season 11, Episode 14: "Stellen Sie sich vor, man hat Dr. Prestel erschossen" (1984)
