= Michael Zittel =

German stage, film, and television actor (born 1951)

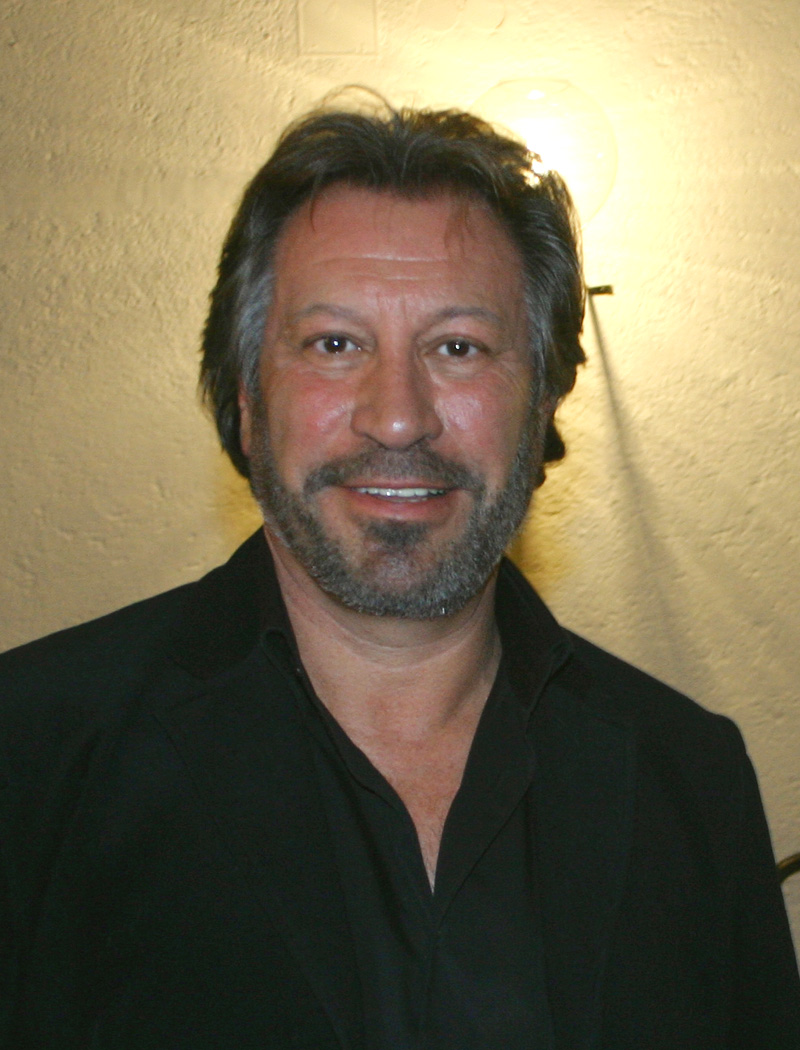
- Michael Zittel
- Born: February 9, 1951; Mosbach im Odenwald, Germany
- Occupation: Actor

Michael Zittel (born 9 February 1951) is a German stage, film, and television actor.

== Biography ==
Michael Zittel was born in Mosbach, Germany. His father was a doctor and his mother was a homemaker. He studied medicine for a few semesters but then trained at a playhouse in Heidelberg. He is one of Germany's best known and most popular actors. From October 2006 to June 2009, he has played Johann Gruber in the ARD-telenovela "Sturm der Liebe" (Storm of Love). He lives in Munich with his wife, has three children, and also runs a furniture shop.

== Filmography ==
His films include:-

- 2008: SOKO Kitzbühel
- 2008: Das Musikhotel am Wolfgangsee
- 2007: Tatort
- 2006-2009: Sturm der Liebe
- 2005: Der Clown
- 2001: Im Namen des Gesetzes
- 1998-2005: Siska
- 1995: Die einzige Zeugin
- 1994-2006: The Old Fox
- 1994: Die Wache

== Theatre ==
- Das Geld liegt auf der Bank
- Laura
- Lissabonner Traviata
- Gerüchte?Gerüchte
- Lorbeeren für Herrn Schütz
- Schöne Familie
- Die Räuber
- Bericht für eine Akademie (Kafka)
- Merchant of Venice
