= Karl-Heinz Vosgerau =

German actor (1927–2021)

- Born: 16 August 1927; Kiel, Schleswig-Holstein, Prussia, Germany
- Died: 4 January 2021 (aged 93); Germany

Karl-Heinz Vosgerau (16 August 1927 in Kiel – 4 January 2021) was a German actor, mostly in television.

== Selected filmography ==
- Wie ein Blitz (1970, TV miniseries)
- Eight Hours Don't Make a Day (1972, TV series)
- World on a Wire (1973, TV film)
- The Lost Honour of Katharina Blum (1975)
- Die Kette (1977, TV film)
- Derrick - Season 7, Episode 6: "Die Entscheidung" (1980, TV)
- The Man in Pyjamas (1981)
- The Roaring Fifties (1983)
- Patrik Pacard (1984, TV miniseries)
- Die Wächter (1986, TV miniseries)
- M.E.T.R.O. – Ein Team auf Leben und Tod (2006, TV series)
