= Lis Verhoeven =

German actress and theatre director (1931–2019)

Lis Verhoeven (also spelled Liz Verhoeven) (11 March 1931 in Frankfurt am Main – 2 July 2019) was a German actress and theatre director.

Verhoeven was the daughter of Paul Verhoeven. She was the first wife of Mario Adorf, by whom she had a daughter, Stella Maria Adorf, also an actress.
