= Hans-Georg Panczak =

German actor

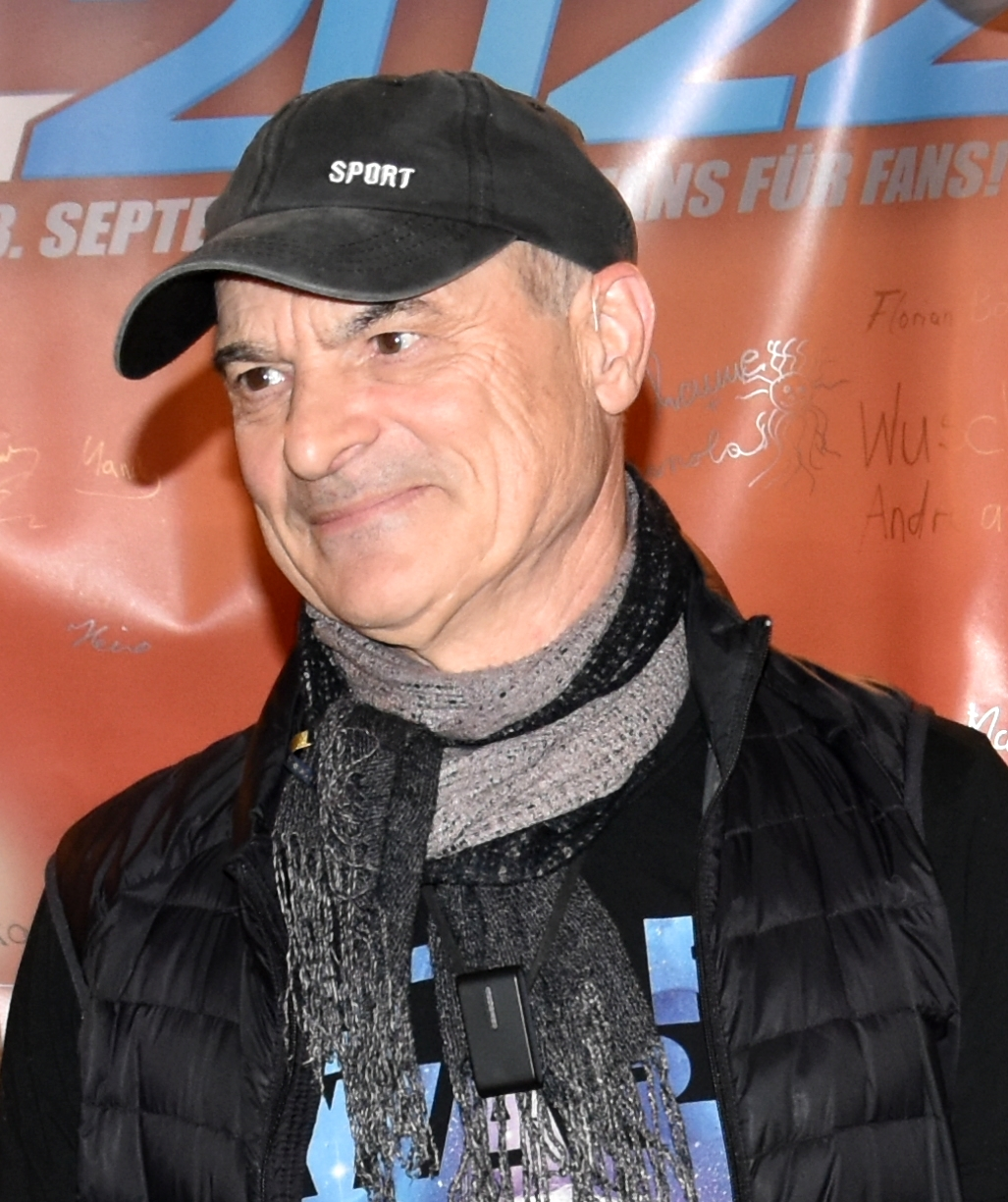
- Born: 19 July 1952 (age 72); Düsseldorf, West Germany
- Occupation: Actor

Hans-Georg Panczak (born 19 July 1952) is a German actor. He is best known as the German voice of Waylon Smithers in The Simpsons, of Luke Skywalker in the original Star Wars trilogy, and of Glenn Quagmire in Family Guy since the fourth season.

== Selected filmography ==
- Derrick - Season 2, Episode 10: "Kamillas junger Freund" (1975)
- Die Tannerhütte (1976, TV film)
- Derrick - Season 5, Episode 4: "Ein Hinterhalt" (1978)
- Meister Timpe (1980, TV film)
- Jeans (1981, TV film)
- Derrick - Season 9, Episode 2: "Eine Falle für Derrick" (1982)
- Time Troopers (1984, TV film)
- Derrick - Season 12, Episode 4: "Toter Goldfisch" (1985)
- A Touch of Danger (1988, TV film)
