= Sona MacDonald =

Austrian-American actress and singer (born 1961)

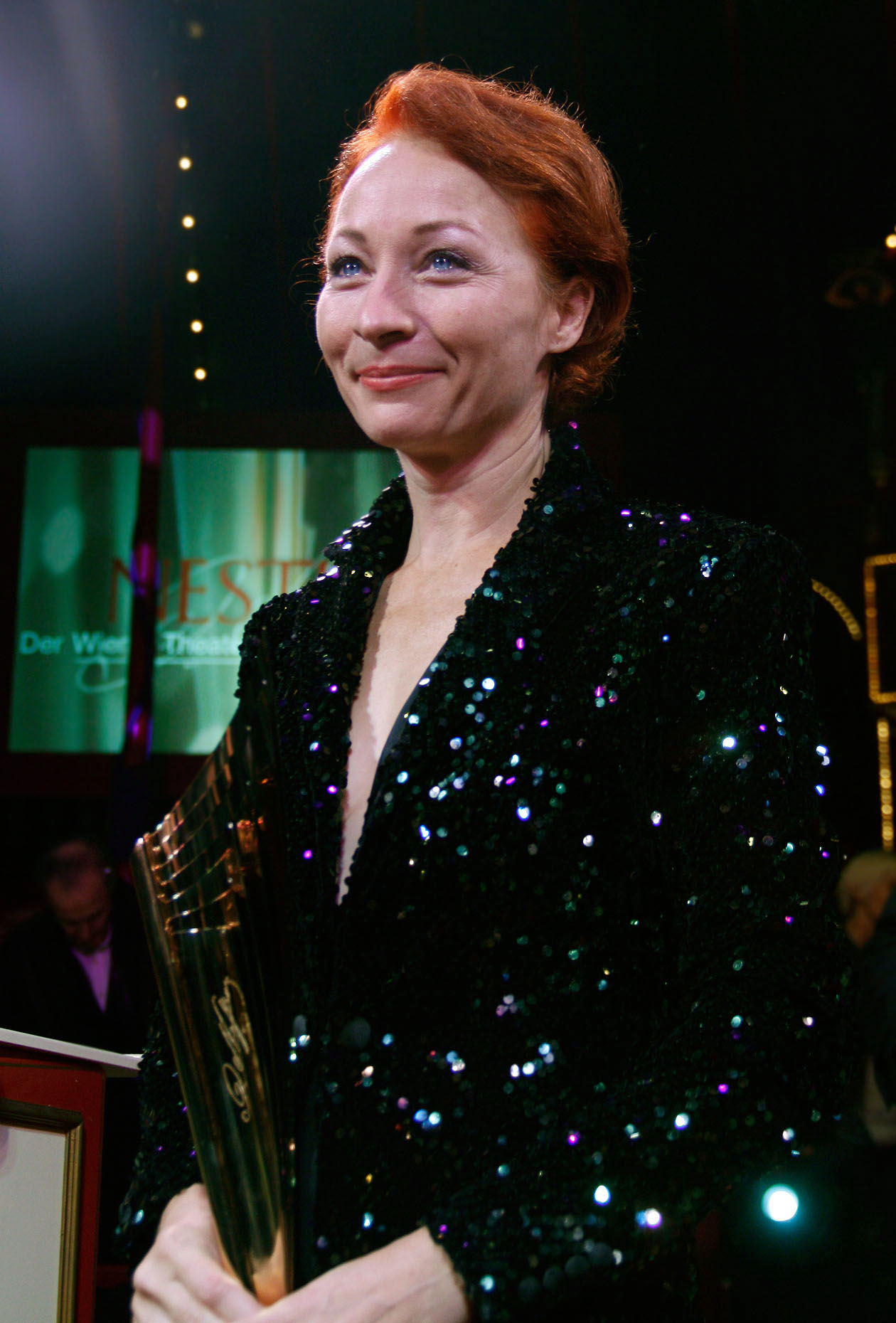
- Born: Sona MacDonald; May 11, 1961 (age 63); Vienna, Austria

Sona MacDonald (born May 11, 1961, in Vienna, Austria) is an Austrian-American actress and singer.

Sona MacDonald attended the London Academy of Music and Dramatic Art. Between classic stage roles in Berlin and Vienna she plays leading roles in musicals and appears in concerts.

Directed by Peter Zadek, with whom she often collaborated, she starred in plays at the Schiller Theater in Berlin and at the Volksbühne Berlin. She soon was named Germany's "most promising young actress" and appeared at the Theater in der Josefstadt in Vienna, Salzburg Festival, Deutsche Oper Berlin, Theater des Westens Berlin, Residenztheater Munich, Berliner Philharmonie, Vienna Festival, Raimund Theater Vienna and in Los Angeles, Jerusalem, Zurich and Amsterdam. She played leading roles in musicals like "Les Miserables", "A Chorus Line", "Cyrano", "My Fair Lady", "Kiss me, Kate", "Chicago" and appeared in concerts worldwide. She was often cast for parts in works of Kurt Weill like "The Threepenny Opera", "The Rise and Fall of the City of Mahagonny" or "The Seven Deadly Sins".

Sona MacDonald received the prestigious O.E.Hasse Award and won the Nestroy Theatre Prize for her role in "Der Talisman" at the Josefstadt Theatre in October 2009.

Sona MacDonald's father was the pianist Robert MacLaurin MacDonald, who also was Professor and Artist-in-Residence at Florida Southern College in Lakeland, Florida, US.
