= Robert Jarczyk =

German actor (born 1959)

Robert Jarczyk (born October 13, 1959 in Munich) is a German television actor.
