= Peter Fricke =

German actor

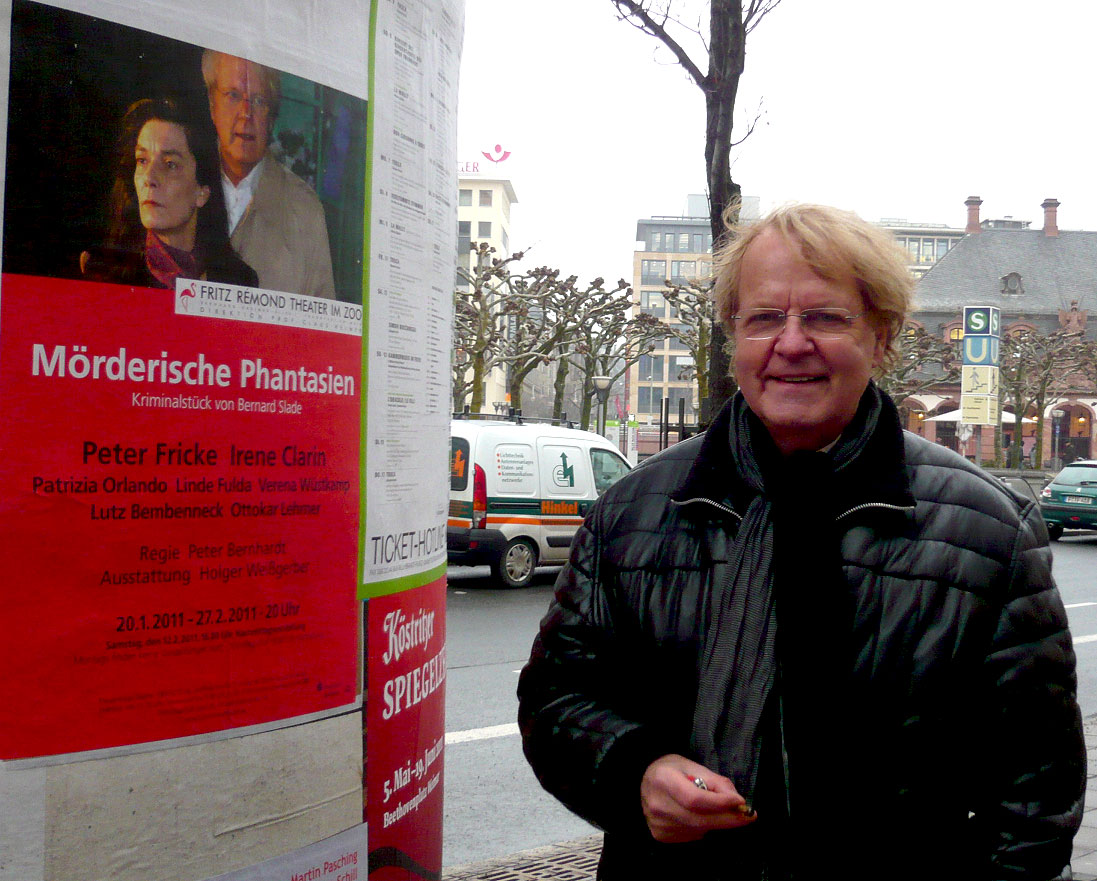
- Peter Fricke in front of a poster of the play he was starring at, in Frankfurt
- Born: 26 August 1939 (age 87); Berlin, Germany
- Website: www.peterfricke-online.de

Peter Fricke (born 26 August 1939, in Berlin, Germany) is a German television actor.

== Filmography (incomplete) ==
- Die rote Kapelle (1972, TV miniseries)
- Alexander Zwo (1972, TV miniseries)
- Oh Jonathan – oh Jonathan! (1973)
- Das Blaue Palais (1974-1976, TV miniseries)
- Derrick - Season 5, Episode 6: "Klavierkonzert" (1978)
- Derrick - Season 6, Episode 11: "Die Versuchung" (1979)
- Derrick - Season 7, Episode 2: "Unstillbarer Hunger" (1980)
- Der Sonne entgegen (1985, TV series)
- Der Schatz im Niemandsland (1987, TV miniseries)
- Derrick - Season 18, Episode 7: "Der Tote spielt fast keine Rolle" (1991)
- Derrick - Season 19, Episode 7: "Eine eiskalte Nummer" (1992)
- Derrick - Season 19, Episode 11: "Ein merkwürdiger Privatdetektiv" (1992)
- Derrick - Season 20, Episode 3: "Langsamer Walzer" (1993)
- Derrick - Season 22, Episode 2: "Anruf aus Wien" (1995)
