= Werner Asam =

German actor and director (1944–2026)

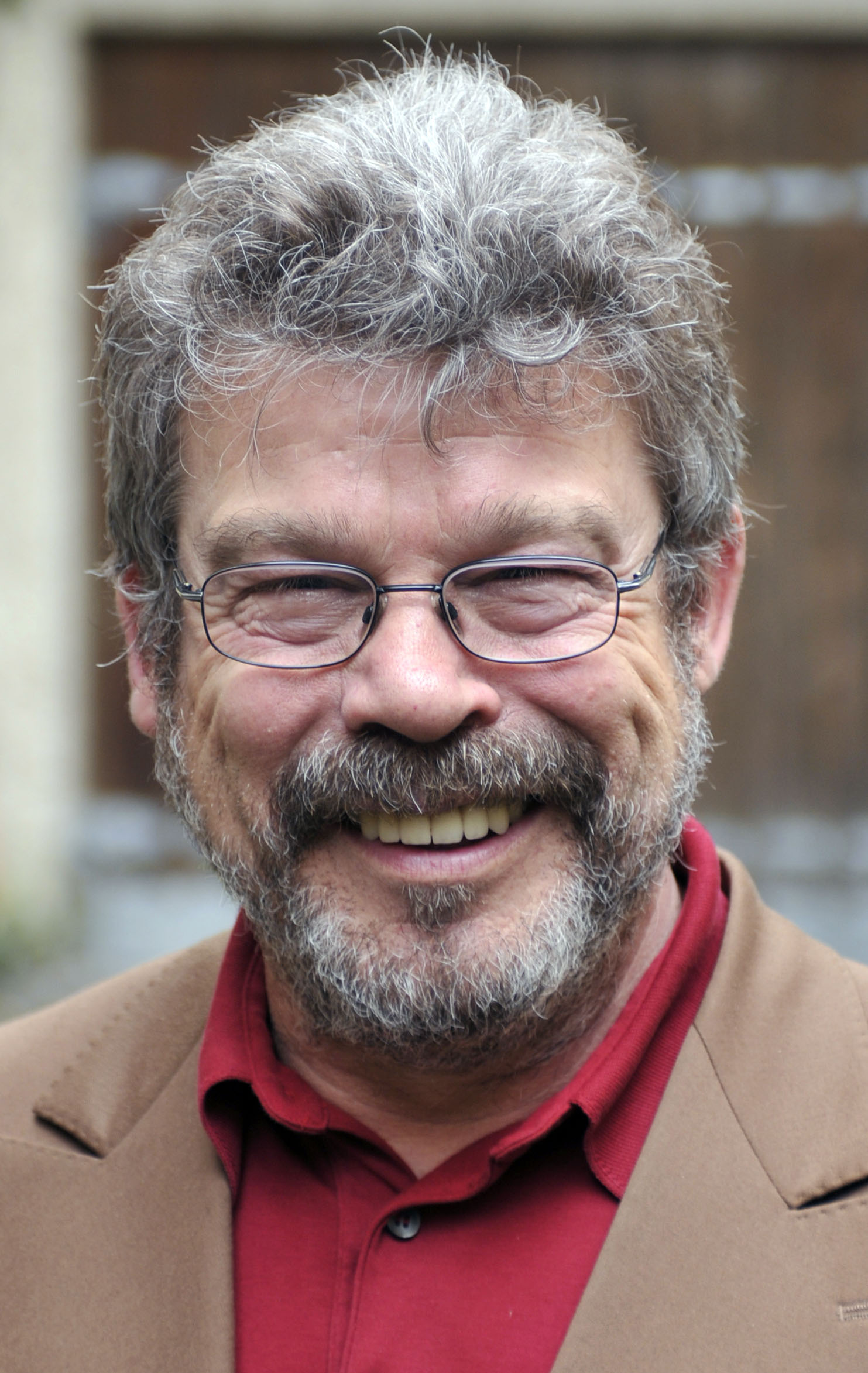
Werner Asam

Werner Asam (17 October 1944 in Munich – 28 March 2026) was a German television actor, film director and writer.

Asam played several roles in Derrick during the 1980s and 1990s. He died on 28 March 2026, at the age of 81.

== Selected filmography ==
- Derrick - Season 5, Episode 4: "Ein Hinterhalt" (1978)
- Derrick - Season 5, Episode 12: "Ute und Manuela" (1978)
- Derrick - Season 7, Episode 4: "Tödliche Sekunden" (1980)
- Derrick - Season 8, Episode 6: "Tod eines Italieners" (1981)
- Derrick - Season 8, Episode 11: "Die Stunde der Mörder" (1981)
- Derrick - Season 10, Episode 9: "Die Schrecken der Nacht" (1983)
- Derrick - Season 12, Episode 5: "Wer erschoß Asmy?" (1985)
- Trokadero (1981)
- Die Stimme des Mörders (14 April 1989)
- Darf ich Ihnen meinen Mörder vorstellen? (24 June 1994)
- Die zweite Kugel
