= Ulli Kinalzik =

German actor

Ulli Kinalzik (born February 26, 1939, in Grabów, Poland) is a German actor, starring in many films spanning five decades.

== Selected filmography ==
- Derrick - Season 2, Episode 2 "Tod am Bahngleis" (1975)
- Derrick - Season 3, Episode 4: "Tote Vögel singen nicht" (1976)
- Derrick - Season 5, Episode 10: "Der Spitzel" (1978)
- Derrick - Season 9, Episode 1: "Eine Rose im Müll" (1982)
- Derrick - Season 11, Episode 6: "Keine schöne Fahrt nach Rom" (1984)
