= Willy Schäfer (actor) =

German television actor

Willy Schäfer (6 March 1933 – 6 May 2011) was a German television actor. Schäfer is best known as Willi Berger on the television series Derrick, a role he played in more than 190 of the series' 281 episodes. He was born in Saarbrücken, Territory of the Saar Basin, and died in Munich, Germany. Willy Schäfer was married and lived in Munich, where he had settled since 1960 and became a permanent resident because of his role in Derrick. He is survived by a son.

== Filmography ==
Year	Title	Role	Notes
1958	Sebastian Kneipp	Vittorio	
1959	Girls for the Mambo-Bar	Passant am Beginn	Uncredited
1959	Der Schatz vom Toplitzsee	Jugoslawischer Grenz-Sergeant	Uncredited
1960	Punishment battalion 999	Feldwebel Haack	
1960	Brandenburg Division	Russischer Offizier	
1984	Der Rekord	Geschäftsführer	
