= Pierre Franckh =

German author, speaker, businessman and actor (born 1953)

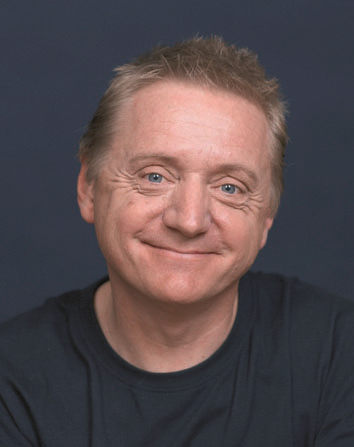
- Franckh in 2014
- Born: May 1, 1953 (age 73); Heilbronn, West Germany
- Occupations: Book author; motivational speaker; keynote speaker; entrepreneur; seminar leader; actor; director
- Years active: 1962–present
- Spouse: Michaela Merten
- Website: www.pierre-franckh.de

Pierre Franckh (German: [ˈpjɛːɐ̯ ˈfʁaŋk]; born 1 May 1953) is a German author, motivational speaker, keynote speaker, businessman, seminar leader, actor, and film director.

== Biography ==
Pierre Franckh is the youngest son of the actress Ursula Franckh and the director, actor, and translator of French literature Hans Heinz Franckh. At the age of six, Franckh was already on stage with Theo Lingen. At the age of ten, he made his film debut in the feature film Das Haus in Montevideo (1963) by Helmut Käutner as one of Heinz Rühmann's children. In Pepe, der Paukerschreck (1969), he played a student spy infiltrated by his uncle and principal (Theo Lingen) at the Mommsen Gymnasium, but who eventually adapts. His breakthrough came at the age of 14 when he played a leading role in Der Kommissar. Since then, he has appeared in many feature films, frequently appeared on theater stages such as the Residenztheater in Munich, the Renaissance Theater in Berlin, and performed in Stuttgart and Frankfurt am Main.

On television, he appeared in over 350 television productions. In series such as Derrick or Der Alte, Diese Drombuschs, Rivalen der Rennbahn, etc., he took on character roles and comedic roles in numerous television plays.

From 1976 to 1978, he hosted Hit-Kwiss, the first pop music quiz program for young people, with hits and stars from international hit parades, which ran successfully for over three years on ARD, a novelty in German television history.

In 1995, he played the stenographer in the national and international award-winning film Der Totmacher, a film directed by Romuald Karmakar that mainly dealt between three people, alongside Götz George and Jürgen Hentsch. This film is the most awarded in German cinema history, including the German Film Award, and was submitted as an official entry for the Academy Awards in 1996. In 2002, Costa-Gavras' film The Deputy, in which Franckh played the role of Pastor Wehr, screened in competition at the Berlin International Film Festival.

He debuted as a screenwriter and director in 2000 with the feature film Just the Beginning. He is the author of the theater play Das ist mein Bett.

His great-granduncle founded Franckh'sche Verlagsbuchhandlung in 1822 Friedrich Schiller's sister, Luise Dorothea Katharina Schiller, married Johann Gottlieb Franckh, (b. 1766; † 1836), a dean by profession, a great-granduncle of Pierre Franckh. Pierre Franckh's grandfather, Manfred Franckh, was a friend and patron of Count Zeppelin, and published his first books. Franckh's grandfather, Manfred Franckh, was a friend and patron of Count Zeppelin.

Pierre Franckh has been married to Michaela Merten since 1992 and lives in Munich. In 1993, a daughter was born to them.

== Writer and Coach ==
Since 1996, Franckh has also been active as an author of advice books and coaches.

In September 2004, his advice book Glücksregeln für die Liebe was published by Koha-Verlag and made the bestseller list of Stern magazine. With a total circulation of over three million, Pierre Franckh is one of the most successful German authors in life advice. His books have been published in 21 countries. At times, three of his books were on the Focus bestseller lists at the same time. His series Der 6-Minuten-Coach became a SPIEGEL bestseller. Franckh lectures all over the world and gives seminars. As a coach, he is active in business and a trainer for kinesiologists and alternative practitioners.

In 2014, together with his wife Michaela Merten, he founded the online academy and community Happiness House, which offers online courses for personal development, happiness training, and meditation based on the findings of positive psychology.

== Filmography ==
- 1962: Peter Pan (TV)
- 1963: Südfrüchte (TV)
- 1963: The House in Montevideo
- 1964: Tales of a Young Scamp
- 1964: Unsere große Schwester
- 1966: Spielplatz (TV)
- 1966: Millionär in der Seifenblase
- 1968: Sie schreiben mit – Die Chauffeursmütze
- 1969: Der Kommissar: Auf dem Stundenplan Mord
- 1969: Pepe, der Paukerschreck (Pepe: His Teacher's Fright)
- 1969: Hurra, die Schule brennt! (Hurrah, the School Is Burning)
- 1970: Frisch, fromm, fröhlich, frei
- 1970: Der Kommissar: ...wie die Wölfe
- 1971: Rappelkiste
- 1971: Cabaret
- 1972: Fußballtrainer Wulf
- 1972: Der Kommissar - "Tod eines Schulmädchens" (TV)
- 1972: Der Kommissar - "Blinde Spiele" (TV)
- 1973: Der Kommissar - "Tod eines Buchhändlers" (TV)
- 1974: Unter Ausschluß der Öffentlichkeit
- 1974: Unser Walter (7 Episoden)
- 1975: Crime After School
- 1975: Derrick - Season 2, Episode 7: "Hoffmanns Höllenfahrt" (TV)
- 1976: Derrick - Season 3, Episode 13: "Pecko" (TV)
- 1976: Block 7
- 1976: Bier und Spiele
- 1976–1978: HIT KWISS
- 1977: Tatort: Spätlese
- 1977: Polizeiinspektion 1: Die Reportage
- 1977: Eichholz und Söhne
- 1978: Polizeiinspektion 1: Glücksspiele
- 1978: Ausgerissen! Was nun?
- 1979: The Lady Vanishes
- 1979: Die Geschichte der Anna Wildermuth (TV)
- 1979: Der Alte: Der Abgrund
- 1979: Was wären wir ohne uns
- 1980: Grenzfälle
- 1980: Sunday Children
- 1980: Derrick - Season 7, Episode 2: "Unstillbarer Hunger" (TV)
- 1981: Derrick - Season 8, Episode 7: "Das sechste Streichholz" (TV)
- 1981: Wolly
- 1981: Merlin
- 1981: Der Alte: Freispruch
- 1981: Manni, der Libero
- 1982: Tatort: So ein Tag …
- 1982: Gefährliches Spiel
- 1982: Tatort: Tod auf dem Rastplatz
- 1982: Ein bisschen Halleluja (TV)
- 1983: Diese Drombuschs (TV series)
- 1983: Tatort: Der Schläfer
- 1983: Der Alte: Kahlschlag
- 1983: Polizeiinspektion 1, Episode "Die Fortuna-Verkehrs-GmbH"
- 1983: Der Eimer und die Mona Lisa
- 1983: Der Mann aus dem Gästezimmer
- 1983: Kontakt bitte
- 1983: Krimistunde
- 1983: Unsere schönsten Jahre
- 1983: Ravioli
- 1984: Vor dem Sturm
- 1984: Tatort: Verdeckte Ermittlung
- 1984: Derrick - Season 11, Episode 5: "Tödlicher Ausweg" (TV)
- 1985: Derrick - Season 12, Episode 2: "Gregs Trompete" (TV)
- 1985: Derrick - Season 12, Episode 11: "Tod eines jungen Mädchens" (TV)
- 1985: Unsere schönsten Jahre
- 1985: Taxi, Schraube, Schrott
- 1985: Vor dem Sturm
- 1985: Tatort: Acht, neun – aus
- 1986: Glückliche Reise
- 1986: Der Schatz im Niemandsland
- 1986: Mütter und Töchter (TV)
- 1986: Derrick - Season 13, Episode 11: "Die Rolle seines Lebens" (TV)
- 1986: The Black Forest Clinic (TV series)
- 1987: Der Schatz im Niemandsland (TV miniseries)
- 1987: Großstadtrevier: Fotos aus Ibiza
- 1988: Ein Heim für Tiere
- 1988: Der Schwammerlkönig
- 1988: Der Freispruch
- 1988: Derrick - Season 15, Episode 5: "Auf Motivsuche" (TV)
- 1988: Medicopter 117 – Jedes Leben zählt (TV)
- 1989: Bodo - Eine ganz normale Familie (The Wiz Kid)
- 1989: Geld macht nicht glücklich
- 1989: Forstinspektor Buchholz
- 1989: Rivalen der Rennbahn
- 1989: Tatort: Keine Tricks, Herr Bülow
- 1991: Tatort: Rikki
- 1992: Der Tanz auf dem Seil (TV)
- 1993: Sylter Geschichten (TV)
- 1993: Das Geheimnis der Uhr
- 1993: Eurocops: Alte Freunde
- 1993: Glückliche Reise – Puerto Rico
- 1994: Derrick - Season 21, Episode 9: "Der Schlüssel" (TV)
- 1994: Die Botschafterin (TV)
- 1994: Blinde Rache
- 1994: Weißblaue Geschichten
- 1994: Nachtrunden
- 1994: Tatort: Der Rastplatzmörder
- 1994: Immer wenn sie Krimis liest
- 1995: Tatort: Eine mörderische Rolle
- 1995: Der Tannenzweig
- 1995: Der Alte: Am hellichten Tag
- 1995: Kämpf um dein Leben
- 1995: Veterinarian Christine II: The Temptation
- 1995: Deathmaker
- 1995: Aus heiterem Himmel (TV series)
- 1996: Der Mann ohne Schatten (TV series)
- 1996: Derrick - Season 23, Episode 12: "Bleichröder ist tot" (TV)
- 1996: Der Mann ohne Schatten
- 1996: Der Tod schreibt das Ende
- 1996: Bleichroeder ist tot
- 1997: Weißblaue Wintergeschichten
- 1997: Café Meineid
- 1997: Derrick - Season 24, Episode 10: "Pornocchio" (TV)
- 1997: Rosenzweigs Freiheit (Rosenzweig's Freedom, TV)
- 1998: Derrick - Season 25, Episode 2: "Anna Lakowski" (TV)
- 1998: Derrick - Season 25, Episode 5: "Das Abschiedsgeschenk" (TV)
- 1998: Medicopter 117 – Jedes Leben zählt
- 1998: Frankfurt Millennium (TV)
- 1999: Il Cuore e la spada (The Heart and the Sword, TV)
- 2000: Just the Beginning, also Director
- 2000: Der Alte: Schrecklicher Irrtum
- 2001: Siska: Die Hölle des Staatsanwaltes
- 2001: Zwei Brüder: Abschied, TV
- 2001: Im Name des Gesetzes (TV)
- 2002: Amen.
- 2003: Edel & Starck (TV)
- 2003: SOKO München: Match over
- 2004: Unser Charly: Gewagter Einsatz, TV

== Theater (selection) ==
Residenztheater

- Undine
- Macbeth
- Faust
- Prinz Friedrich von Homburg

Komödie München

- Mein Vater hatte recht
- Schon vor der Hochzeit
- Die Schule der Ehe
- Belvedere

Theater am Kurfürstendamm

- Frühstück bei Riffifi

Renaissancetheater Berlin

- Der Kirschgarten

Tournee

- Der Strom
- Schmetterlinge sind frei
- Meine dicke Freundin

Heilbronn

- Das Standbild der Morgenröte
- Der Tod im Apfelbaum

Stuttgart

- Der Mann aus dem Gästezimmer
- Die Jungs von nebenan

Bonn

- Der Mann aus dem Gästezimmer

Hannover

- Clown Clown Clown
- Sommernachtstraum

== Dubbing roles (selection) ==
=== Movies ===
- 1974: Ekkehardt Belle as Pauli in Es war nicht die Nachtigall
- 1980: Christopher Atkins as Richard in Die blaue Lagune
- 1990: Michael Biehn as Lt. James Curran in Navy Seals – Die härteste Elitetruppe der Welt
- 1992: Tim Curry as Hector, Hotelconcierge in Kevin – Allein in New York
- 1993: Michael Jeter as Pater Ignatius in Sister Act 2 – In göttlicher Mission
- 2005: Bill Bailey as Wal in Per Anhalter durch die Galaxis

=== Series ===
- 1981: as Verkehrspolizist in Die Märchenbraut
- 1983: Michael Bowen as Bill Reed in Falcon Crest
- 1987: Michael Bowen as Jack Harm in Ein Engel auf Erden
- 1993–1994: as Wusel in Als die Tiere den Wald verließen
- 1995: Harry Anderson as Harry "The Hat" Gittes in Cheers

== Awards ==
- 1996: German Film Award 1996 with Der Totmacher in the category: Best Film

== Publications ==
=== Books ===
- Franckh, Pierre (2004). Glücksregeln für die Liebe [Happiness rules for love] (in German). Burgrain: Koha. ISBN 978-3-936862-50-8.
- Franckh, Pierre (2005). Erfolgreich wünschen: 7 Regeln, wie Träume wahr werden [Successful wishing: 7 rules how to make dreams come true] (in German). Burgrain: Koha. ISBN 978-3-936862-66-9.
- Franckh, Pierre; Franckh, Julia (2005). Papa, erklär mir die Welt ... ich erkläre dir meine [Dad, explain the world to me... I explain my] (in German). München: Pattloch. ISBN 978-3-629-01359-0.
- Franckh, Pierre (2006). Ich liebe dich: Vom Glück ein Paar zu sein [I love you: About the happiness of being a couple] (in German). attloch Geschenkbuch. ISBN 978-3629101006.
- Franckh, Pierre (2007). Wünsch es dir einfach - aber richtig [Just make a wish - but make it right.] (in German). n: KOHA-Verlag. ISBN 978-3-86728-031-0.
- Franckh, Pierre (2007). Erfolgreich lieben: 49 Botschaften um wieder glücklich zu lieben [Love successfully: 49 messages to love happily again.] (in German). AGM Urania. ISBN 978-3-03-819315-9.
- Franckh, Pierre; Merten, Michaela (2007). Der ganz alltägliche Beziehungswahnsinn [The everyday relationship madness] (in German). München: Ariston. ISBN 978-3-7205-4000-1.
- Franckh, Pierre (2008). Einfach glücklich sein! 7 Schlüssel zur Leichtigkeit des Seins [Just be happy! 7 keys to the lightness of being] (in German). München: Goldmann. ISBN 978-3-442-33793-4.
- Franckh, Pierre (2008). Das Gesetz der Resonanz [The law of resonance.] (in German). KOHA-Verlag. ISBN 978-3-86728-700-5.
- Franckh, Pierre (2008). Wunschgeschichten für die Seele [Wish stories for the soul] (in German). KOHA-Verlag. ISBN 978-3-86728-077-8.
- Franckh, Pierre (2008). Wünsch es dir einfach - aber mit Leichtigkeit [Make a wish - but with ease] (in German). KOHA-Verlag. ISBN 978-3-86728-037-2.
- Franckh, Pierre (2009). Der ganz alltägliche Beziehungswahnsinn [The everyday madness of relationships] (in German). Berlin: Ullstein. ISBN 978-3-548-74455-1.
- Franckh, Pierre (2009). 365 Tage erfolgreich wünschen [Wish 365 days of success] (in German). München: arsEdition. ISBN 978-3-7607-4970-9.
- Franckh, Pierre (2010). 365 Tage einfach glücklich sein! [365 days just be happy!] (in German). München: arsEdition. ISBN 978-3-7607-4411-7.
- Franckh, Pierre (2010). Wünsch Dich schlank: 11 Schlüssel zum idealen Wunschgewicht [Wish yourself slim: 11 keys to the ideal weight] (in German). Burgrain: Koha. ISBN 978-3-86728-114-0.
- Franckh, Pierre (2010). Heute ist ein guter Tag, weil ... Mein Glücks-Tagebuch [Today is a good day because ... My happiness diary] (in German). München: Südwest. ISBN 978-3-517-08686-6.
- Franckh, Pierre (2010). Das Geheimnis der Wunschkraft. 49 Schlüssel zur Wunschverstärkung [The secret of desire power. 49 Key to wish strengthening] (in German). Krummwisch: Königsfurt-Urania. ISBN 978-3-86826-716-7.
- Franckh, Pierre (2011). Heute ist ein guter Tag - Kalender 2013 [Today is a good day - Calendar 2013] (in German). München: Irisiana. ISBN 978-3-424-15153-4.
- Franckh, Pierre (2011). Einfach erfolgreich sein - Lebe deinen Traum [Simply be successful - Live your dream] (in German). München: Arkana. ISBN 978-3-442-33890-0.
- Franckh, Pierre (2011). Die 77 erfolgreichsten Wunschregeln [77 most successful wish rules] (in German). Burgrain: Koha. ISBN 978-3-86728-143-0.
- Franckh, Pierre (2011). 21 Wege, die Liebe zu finden [21 ways to find love] (in German). München: Knaur. ISBN 978-3-426-87586-5.
- Franckh, Pierre; Merten, Michaela (2012). Nicht ohne meinen Rettungsring: Glücksmomente für den Alltag [Not without my life ring : moments of happiness for everyday life] (in German). München: Südwest. ISBN 978-3-517-08783-2.
- Franckh, Pierre (2012). 7 Glücksregeln für die Wunschfigur. Mit 30 Schlankrezepten [7 lucky rules for the desired figure. With 30 slimming recipes] (in German). München: Gräfe und Unzer. ISBN 978-3-8338-2402-9.
- Franckh, Pierre (2013). Der 6 Minuten Coach – Erfinde dich neu [The 6 Minute Coach - Reinvent Yourself] (in German). Arkanarre. ISBN 978-3442341269.
- Franckh, Pierre (2013). Heute ist ein guter Tag – Tägliche Impulse 2014 [Today is a good day - Daily Impulses 2014] (in German). Südwest Verlag. ISBN 978-3-424-15282-1.
- Franckh, Pierre (2014). Der 6 Minuten Coach – Finde die wahre Liebe [The 6 Minute Coach - Find True Love] (in German). Arkana. ISBN 978-3424152623.
- Franckh, Pierre (2014). Wünsch mir was – Das Eintragebuch [Make a wish - The entry book] (in German). Irisiana. ISBN 978-3517088761.
- Franckh, Pierre (2015). Neue Wunschgeschichten für die Seele [New wish stories for the soul.] (in German). München: Irisiana. ISBN 978-3442341771.
- Franckh, Pierre (2015). Der 6 Minuten Coach – Wahres Selbstvertrauen finden [The 6 Minute Coach - Finding True Self-Confidence] (in German). Arkana. ISBN 978-3-442-34183-2.
- Franckh, Pierre (2015). Der 6 Minuten Coach - schenk dir Selbstliebe [The 6 minute coach - give yourself self-love] (in German). Arkana Verlag. ISBN 978-3-442-22105-9.
- Franckh, Pierre (2015). Einfach glücklich sein! 7 Schlüssel zur Leichtigkeit des Seins [Just be happy! 7 keys to the lightness of being] (in German). München: Goldmann. ISBN 978-3-86728-753-1.
- Franckh, Pierre (2016). Erfolgreich wünschen 3.0 [Successful Wish 3.0] (in German). KOHA-Verlag. ISBN 978-3-86728-753-1.
- Franckh, Pierre (2018). Erfülle deine Herzenswünsche [Fulfil your heart's desires] (in German). Korsch. ISBN 978-3-7827-9480-0.

=== Card set ===
- 2005: Erfolgreich Wünschen: 49 Karten und Anleitung., Königsfurt-Urania Verlag, ISBN 978-3038190233.
- 2009: Heute ist ein guter Tag: 78 Impulse für ein erfülltes Leben, Arkana, ISBN 978-3442338399.
- 2009: Das Geheimnis der Wunschkraft: Anleitungen zur Wunscherfüllung. Kartenset mit 49 Motiv- und 11 Anleitungskarten., Königsfurt-Urania Verlag.
- 2009: Das Gesetz der Resonanz-Kartendeck, Koha, ISBN 978-3867281065.
- 2011: Wünsch dich schlank: 49 Schritte zum Wunschgewicht, Königsfurt-Urania Verlag, ISBN 9783868267389.
- 2014: Erfolgreich Lieben – 49 Botschaften, AGM Urania.

=== Stand-up display/calendar ===
- 2007: Der Wunschkalender. KOHA-Verlag, ISBN 978-3867283311.
- 2011–2012–2013: Wünsch dich schlank – Jahreskalender .
- 2011: Entfalte deine Wunschkraft. GRÄFE UND UNZER Verlag, ISBN 978-3833822919.
- 2014: Erfinde dich neu in 6 Minuten täglich. Arkana, ISBN 978-3442341658.
- 2015: Erfolgreich Wünschen, Königsfurt Urania.
