= Sinan Akkuş =

German-Turkish film director, actor, film producer and screenwriter

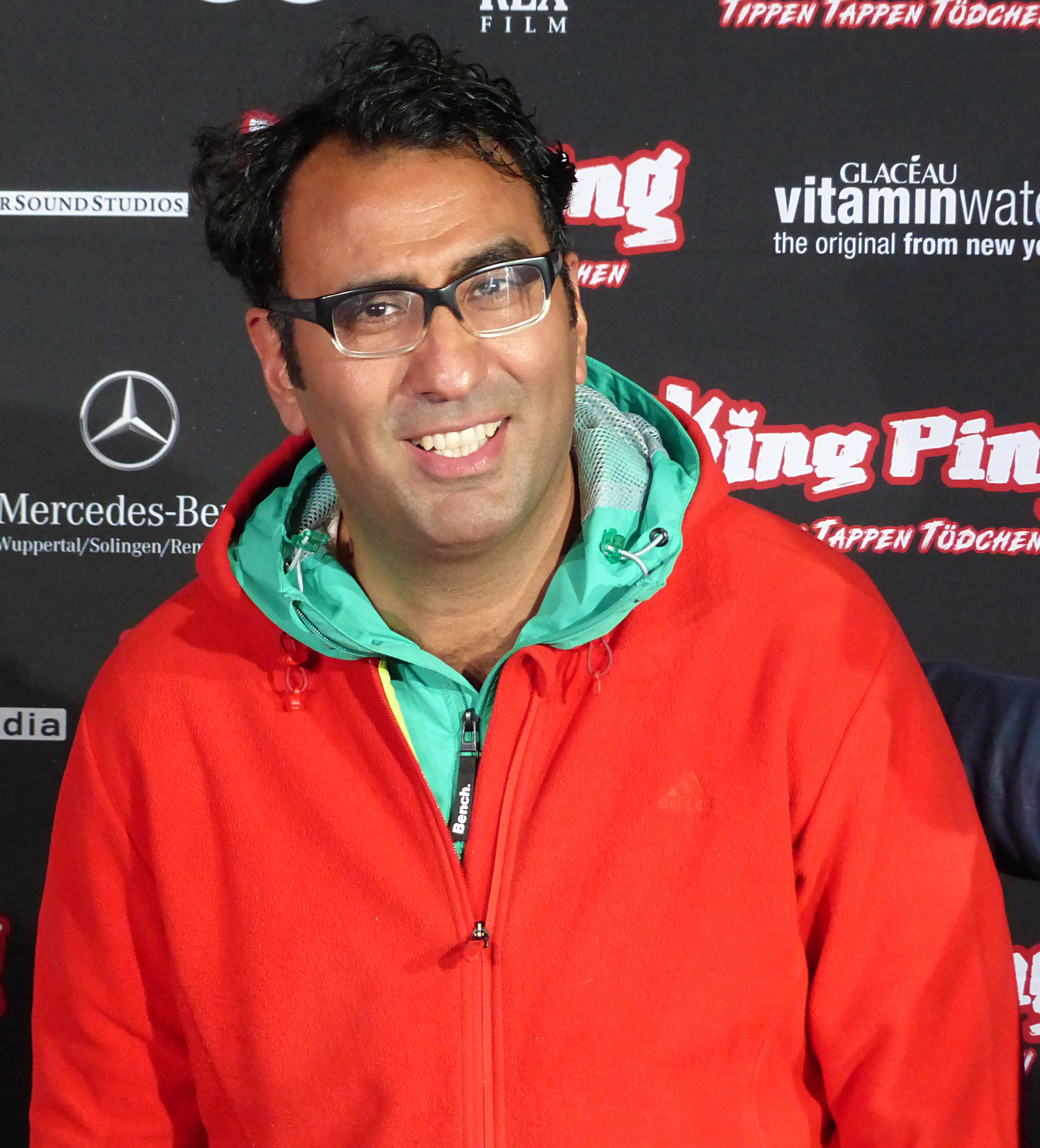
- Born: Sinan Akkuş; 17 December 1971 (age 54); Erzincan, Turkey.
- Years active: 1997–present

Sinan Akkuş (born 17 December 1971) is a Turkish-German director, writer and actor.

== Life and work ==
Sinan Akkuş was born in Turkey. As a child he moved to Germany in 1973. After graduating from high school in Kassel, he studied philosophy, German language and literature from 1992 to 1994. In 1994 he also began studying visual communication with a focus on film and television. In addition, Akkuş worked for the film and television production company kigali-films, where he was involved in camera work, editing and conception of corporate videos. In 1995 he attended the Escuela Internacional de Cine y Televisión as an exchange student in Cuba. In 2000 he graduated from the Kunsthochschule Kassel with a focus on film and television.

Afterwards, Akkuş made a few short films, which received several awards and honours. His short film Lassie (2002), for example, received the rating especially worthwhile from the German Deutsche Film- und Medienbewertung (FBW). His feature film debut Evet, I Do! (2008) also received this rating. In this Culture clash - comedy, Akkuş takes on the subject of marriage among and by ethnic Turks in Germany and the associated difficulties. The film received the audience award Lüdia at the Kinofest Lünen in November 2008 and was released in German cinemas on 1 October 2009.

In 2015, Akkuş' feature film 3 Türken und ein Baby, to which he also wrote the screenplay and in which the German rapper Eko Fresh and the actors Kostja Ullmann and Kida Khodr Ramadan play the leading roles, was released in German cinemas. 3 Türken und ein Baby received the rating worthwhile from the Deutsche Film- und Medienbewertung (FBW) and was nominated for the Civis Media Prize in 2015. This was followed by several directorial works for German television. One of the director's works by Akkuş, the ARD - television film Fischer sucht Frau was nominated for the TV Producer Award at the Hamburg Film Festival in 2018. His ARD - tragicomedy Ihr letzter Wille kann mich mal! starring Heiner Lauterbach, Uwe Ochsenknecht and Svenja Jung celebrated its world premiere at the Biberach Film Festival on November 1, 2019. Akkuş also directed episodes of the first and second season of the ZDF - TV series Wendehammer and the ZDF - television film Extraklasse starring Axel Prahl.

Akkuş has also made on-screen appearances. Among others, he played in the first season of the ProSieben - TV series Stromberg the character Sinan Turçulu, a colleague and one of the strongest competitors of the series main character Bernd Stromberg. Turculu also appears in the feature film Stromberg – The Movie of the series. In the TV series Dr. Psycho – Die Bösen, die Bullen, meine Frau und ich Akkuş had a guest appearance in the episode Der Türke, where he played a police informer.

Furthermore, Akkuş has also acted as a juror for film festivals such as the Bamberger Kurzfilmtage or the Independent Days International Filmfest and works as a lecturer at the acting school IAF - Internationale Akademie für Filmschauspiel in Cologne.

== Filmography (selection) ==
=== Director / screenwriter ===
- 1997: Zeig Dich (short film), (director, screenwriter)
- 2003: Lassie (short film), (director)
- 2004: Sevda heißt Liebe (short film), (director, screenwriter, producer)
- 2008: Evet, I Do! (feature film), (director, screenwriter)
- 2015: 3 Türken und ein Baby (feature film), (director, screenwriter)
- 2018: Fischer sucht Frau (television film), (director)
- 2019: Fast perfekt verliebt (television film), (director)
- 2020: Lehrerin auf Entzug (television series), (director)
- 2021: Mirella Schulze rettet die Welt (television series), (director of 3 episodes)
- 2021: Servus, Schwiegermutter! (television film), (director)
- 2022: Extraklasse – On Tour (television film), (director)
- 2022-2023: Wendehammer (television series), (director of 3 episodes)

=== Actor ===
- 2000: Fußball ist unser Leben (feature film) - Directed by Tomy Wigand
- 2000: Just the Beginning (feature film) – Directed by Pierre Franckh
- 2001: Sheriff (feature film) – Directed by Mihael Langauer
- 2003: Lassie (short film) – Directed by Sinan Akkuş
- 2004: Stromberg (TV series), (Appearance in 8 episodes) – Directed by Arne Feldhusen
- 2007: Dr. Psycho – Die Bösen, die Bullen, meine Frau und ich (TV series) – Directed by Richard Huber
- 2008: Evet, I Do! (feature film) – Directed by Sinan Akkuş
- 2013: Dear Courtney (feature film) – Directed by Rolf Roring
- 2013: 00 Schneider – Im Wendekreis der Eidechse (feature film) - Directed by Helge Schneider
- 2013: King Ping – Tippen Tappen Tödchen (feature film) - Directed by Claude Giffel, Dirk Michael Häger
- 2014: Stromberg – The Movie (feature film) – Directed by Arne Feldhusen
- 2015: 3 Türken und ein Baby (feature film) – Directed by Sinan Akkuş
- 2016: Die Gelben Teufel (short film) – Directed by Bernd Hackmann
- 2018: Fischer sucht Frau (television film) – Directed by Sinan Akkuş
- 2019: Fast perfekt verliebt (television film) – Directed by Sinan Akkuş
- 2022: Wendehammer (television series), (Appearance in 1 episode) – Directed by Sinan Akkuş

=== Other ===
- 2009: The Village (Köy), (short film), (cinematographer) – Directed by Mustafa Dok

== Awards and nominations ==
- 2001: Friedrich-Wilhelm-Murnau-Award at the Day of the German Short Film for Sevda heißt Liebe
- 2002: Audience Award at the film festival Kinofest Lünen for Lassie
- 2003: Audience Award at the Exground Filmfest in Wiesbaden, Germany for Lassie
- 2003: Nomination at the German Filmfestival Max Ophüls Preis in the category Best Short Film for Lassie
- 2008: Merit Award at the Achtung Berlin Film Festival for Evet, I Do!
- 2008: Nomination for the award MFG Star at the Baden-Baden TV Film Festival for Evet, I Do!
- 2009: Prize Lüdia at the film festival Kinofest Lünen in the category Best Feature Film for Evet, I Do!
- 2009: Berndt-Media-Award at the film festival Kinofest Lünen in the category Best Film Title for Evet, I Do!
- 2010: Nomination at the German Film Critics Association Awards in the category Best Feature Film Debut for Evet, I Do!
- 2015: Nomination at the Civis Media Prize in the category CIVIS European Cinema Prize for 3 Türken & ein Baby
