= Constanze Engelbrecht =

German actress (1950–2000)

- Born: 6 January 1950; Munich, West Germany
- Died: 21 July 2000 (aged 50); Munich, Germany
- Occupation: Actress
- Years active: 1960–1998

Constanze Engelbrecht (German: [kɔnˈstan.t͡sə ˈɛŋl̩ˌbʁɛçt]; 6 January 1950 – 21 July 2000) was a German actress who was one of the most popular actresses in the country between 1980 and 1990. She appeared in more than seventy films from 1960 to 1998. Her husband was an actor, and her daughter Julie Engelbrecht is an actress.

== Biography ==
Constanze Engelbrecht was born on 6 January 1950 in Munich, West Germany to actress Alice Franz and sculptor Gen Golch. Her very first role was the voice actress for the character "Jeff" in the German version of the TV series Lassie, which she performed for six years. She debuted as a television actress at ten years old in the TV movie Und nicht mehr Jessica (1965) with Horst Naumann and Sascha Hehn. Engelbrecht's original goal was to become a classical soprano and she studied at the Richard Strauss Conservatory of Munich, at the Salzburg Mozarteneum and finally at the Guildhall School of Music and Drama in London before changing to acting and studying under the direction of Rosemarie Fendel. She performed in both live theater and television. Engelbrecht was well known at the theaters of Munich and also performed in Paris at the "Theatre de la ville".

Beginning in the 1970s, she worked in television, playing in Derrick, The Old Fox, Tatort and in 1979 she appeared as Gabrielle d'Estrées in a 12-part historical drama Heinrich, der gute König. In 1980, she and her husband, French writer, director and actor François Nocher, moved to Paris, but she continued to act in German television. During the 1980s, she starred in many mini-series, including Unter der Trikolore (1980), in the seven-part Feuchtwanger adaptation Exil (1981) and the lead actress in Deep Water (1983). She also appeared in films on the big screen during this period with roles in The Train Killer (1983) as Ilona with Michael Sarrazin and Armin Mueller-Stahl; in What's Up, Chancellor? (1984) as the character "Rosi", with Dieter Hildebrandt, Günter Lamprecht, and Tommi Piper; in Fear of Falling (1984) as "Rita" with Horst Buchholz, and in Sierra Leone with Christian Redl.

Between 1987 and 1990 Engelbrecht became known throughout Germany as Brigitte Sanders for the role she played in the television series in Diese Drombuschs. She was the devious ex-wife of Martin Sanders (played by Michael Degen), who will do whatever she can to destroy the new relationship her ex-husband is having with Vera Drombusch (played by Witta Pohl). In 1990, she made a television film, Der Eindringling which was one of her most acclaimed performances. Throughout the 1990s, she worked in television completing the miniseries Die Frauen von Bonne Espérance (1990) and several successful series like Eurocops (1990), The Old Fox (1991), Ein Fall für zwei (1992), Freunde fürs Leben (1993), Praxis Bülowbogen (1994), Schlosshotel Orth (1997), among others. She received praise for the TV miniseries The Shadow Man (1996) with Mario Adorf, Heinz Hoenig, Heiner Lauterbach and Günter Strack and for her lead role in The Sex Thief (1998). Her last role was with Gerard Depardieu in a television production of The Count of Monte Cristo.

Engelbrecht died on 21 July 2000 at the Frauenklinik des Roten Kreuzes Hospital in Munich. She had been fighting breast cancer since 1998 and it had spread to the liver and brain.

== Filmography ==
Year	Title	Role	Notes
1960	Crook and the Cross	Child in the Train	Uncredited
1983	The Train Killer	Ilona Almásy	
1984	What's Up, Chancellor?	Rosi	
1984	Fear of Falling	Rita	
1987	Sierra Leone	Rita	
1989	Karambolage	Ilse Maiwald	TV film
1989	Torquemada		
1990	Marco – Über Meere und Berge	Laura	2 episodes
1992	Shining Through	Stayson Von Neest	
1993	Fiorile	Juliette	
1995	Halali	Corinna von Sarau	
1998	The Count of Monte Cristo	Hermine Danglars	4 episodes

Dubbing / Voice acting
Year	Title	Role	Actress	Notes
1975	Verbrechen nach Schulschluß	Sabine	Evelyne Kraft	
1977	Vanessa	Vanessa Anden	Olivia Pascal	
1979	Nosferatu the Vampyre	Lucy Harker	Isabelle Adjani	
1979	Das Ding	Michaela Hensche	Caroline Chaniolleau	TV film
