= Klinik unter Palmen =

- Starring: Klausjürgen Wussow
- Country of origin: Germany

Production
- Running time: 1996–2003

Klinik unter Palmen is a German television series.

== Casts ==
- Klausjürgen Wussow: Dr. Frank Hofmann 1-8
- Raimund Harmstorf: Hannes Müller 1–2
- Raymond Bagatsing: Pfleger Rajah 1
- Viktoria Brams: Dr. Regina Lehr 1
- Pierre Brice: Jean-Claude Valentine 1
- Ulrich von Dobschütz: Manfred von Wertheim 1
- Hazel Huelves Daphne 1
- Julia Kent: Dr. Juliane Rohrbach 1
- Sonja Kirchberger: Isabelle von Wertheim 1
- Hans Schenker: Dr. Christian Witt
- Gregor Bloéb: Dr. Peter Rembach 2
- Silvan-Pierre Leirich: Dr. Ralf Wolters
- Christine Schuberth: Oberschwester Marietta 2
- Karin Thaler: Dr. Sylvia Rembach 2
- Joan Faulkner: Schwester Ella 3–4
- Elisabeth Lanz: Schwester Anja 3–4
- Michael Lesch: Dr. Peter Sander 3–4
- Charles M. Huber Dr. Alfredo Cremont 3
- Harald Juhnke: Dr. Hendrik Willing 3
- Birgit Schrowange: Vera Richter 3
- Ursela Monn: Dr. Constanze Walther 4–5
- Anja Kruse: Dr. Andrea Kaltenbach 4
- Dierk Prawdzik: Andy 4
- Walter Plathe: Pfleger Manfred „Mücke“ Mikulski 5–6
- Günter Pfitzmann: Dr. Gieselher 5
- Carolina Vera: Schwester Gabriella 5–6
- Marion Mitterhammer: Dr. Nina Schönberg 5
- Valerie Niehaus: Schwester Christine 5
- Ulrich Reinthaller: Dr. David Lichtenfeld 5
- Oliver Tobias: Dr. Rudolfo Garcia 5
- Michael Degen: Dr. Carl Gregorius 6
- Martin Halm: Dr. Ulrich von Jagemann 6
- Hilde van Mieghem: Nadja Gregorius † 6
- Uschi Glas: Dr. Helen Berger 7
- Konstantin Graudus: Jan Ahrens 7
- Karina Kraushaar: Schwester Nicole 7
- Wolf Roth: Dr. Oscar la Fuenta 7
- Gerd Silberbauer: Dr. Michel Cornu 7
- Julia Thurnau: Maren Westendorp 7
- Max Tidof: Dr. Peter Michael Westendorp 7
- Harry Blank: Dr. Enrique Gomez 8
- Radost Bokel: Schwester Jollanda 8
- Johannes Brandrup: Dr. Alexander Ritter 8
- Gaby Dohm: Dorothea Ebel 8
- Karl Fischer: Dr. Peter Wagenknecht 8
- Michael Greiling: Polizeichef Ramon Mantilla 8
- Sabine Vitua: Lisa Mantilla

== See also ==
- List of German television series
