= 2000, Seen By... =

1998 international film project

2000, Seen By... (French: 2000 vu par...) was a 1998 international film project initiated by the French company Haut et Court to produce films depicting the approaching turn of the millennium seen from the perspectives of 10 different countries.

The idea was conceived by producers Caroline Benjo and Carole Scotta, who took the idea to Pierre Chevalier of the French-German TV station Arte. They envisioned each film to be one hour long, made for the cost of four to five million francs, by promising directors.

Ten films were produced as a result of the project:

Title	Director	Country	Notes
The Book of Life (1998)	Hal Hartley	United States	
Frankfurt Millennium (1998)	Romuald Karmakar	Germany	
The Hole (1998)	Tsai Ming-liang	Taiwan	Entered into the 1998 Cannes Film Festival.
La primera noche de mi vida (1998)	Miguel Albaladejo	Spain	
Last Night (1998)	Don McKellar	Canada	Winner of the Award of the Youth at the 1998 Cannes Film Festival. Winner of the Award of the Best Canadian First Feature Film at the 1998 Toronto International Film Festival.
La Vie Sur Terre (1998)	Abderrahmane Sissako	Mali	
Les Sanguinaires (1998)	Laurent Cantet	France	
Midnight (1998)	Walter Salles and Daniela Thomas	Brazil	2000 Ariel Award for Best Latin-American Film.
Tamas and Juli (1998)	Ildikó Enyedi	Hungary	
The Wall (1998)	Alain Berliner	Belgium	
