= Romuald Karmakar =

French film director, screenwriter and producer

- Born: February 15, 1965 (age 60); Wiesbaden, West Germany

Romuald Karmakar (born February 15, 1965) is a French film director, screenwriter and producer. He was born in Wiesbaden, Germany as the son of an Indian father of Bengali descent and a French mother. From 1977 to 1982 he lived in Athens. He has won several national and international awards, including the German National Film Award in Gold in 1996 for Der Totmacher (Deathmaker). His work has been honored with several retrospectives at festivals and cinematheques. In 2008, the MoMA celebrated his film Das Himmler-Projekt (The Himmler Project) as one of the top 250 most important artistic acquisitions of the Museum since 1980. A member of Akademie der Künste, Berlin (the Academy of the Arts, Berlin), Karmakar is internationally regarded for his honest representation of the less attractive aspects of society by focusing on those perpetrators responsible for these downfalls. Karmakar is currently a Fellow at the Radcliffe Institute for Advanced Study at Harvard University (2012–13). He has been invited as one of the four artists (together with Ai Weiwei, Santu Mofokeng and Dayanita Singh) to represent Germany at the German Pavilion at the Art Venice Biennale in 2013.

== Career ==
Romuald Karmakar discovered film in Munich in the 1980s with a group of friends who often met at the Werkstattkino, a legendary local underground cinema theater, and at the Filmmuseum Munich, then run by Enno Patalas, who became famous for his work with silent film restoration. At the age of 19, Karmakar directed several short films and his first S-8 feature-length film, Eine Freundschaft in Deutschland (1985). Depicting the private life of Adolf Hitler during his time in Munich, A Friendship in Germany also stars Karmakar as a young Hitler.

In the following years, Karmakar continued to expand his experience with filmmaking. He directed several short and mid-length films, including Coup de Boule (1987), which shows young French soldiers head-butting in locker rooms, Gallodrome (1988), about cockfighting in northern France, Dogs of Velvet and Steel (1989), about owners of pitbulls in the pimp scene of Hamburg, Sam Shaw on John Cassavetes, about the producer of Gloria, by John Cassavetes, and Demontage IX- Unternehmen Stahlglocke, about a performance of the Austrian artist FLATZ, in which he crashes between two metal plates while hanging upside down on a rope.

Karmakar then directed a three-hour documentary, Warheads (1993), which explores the lives of a German ex-Legionnaire and a British mercenary. The shooting for Warheads took place in a paramilitary training camp in Mississippi, French Guiana, and in the midst of the civil war in Croatia in 1991.

His first feature-length film, Deathmaker (1995), was based on psychiatriatric interrogations with the serial killer Fritz Haarmann conducted by his prison psychiatrist in 1924. Taking place exclusively in a small prison interrogation room, Deathmaker belongs to the Kammerspiel, or chamberplay, genre of German film. Fritz Haarmann was also the inspiration for the role of Peter Lorre in Fritz Lang’s classic film, M (1931). In 1995, the film won the Best Actor Award at the Venice Film Festival and the German Film Award in several categories. Distributed by Warner Bros. in Germany, the film was a great success in German box offices. Director Monte Hellman (Two-Lane Blacktop) conducted the American DVD release.

In 1998, Karmakar contributed an hour-long special, Frankfurt Millennium, to a special series on the French TV channel, ARTE, for the changing century. Frankfurt Millennium was presented alongside films by Hal Hartley, Don McCellar, Walther Salles, and Tsai Ming-liang.

Karmakar then directed Manila (2000), a fictional ensemble film starring Margit Carstensen, Michael Degen, Herbert Feuerstein, Elizabeth McGovern, Sky Dumont, Peter Rühring, Martin Semmelrogge, Jürgen Vogel, and Manfred Zapatka. The film depicts a group of tourists who are trapped at the Manila airport after damage to their aircraft. Despite winning the 2000 Silver Leopard Award at the Locarno International Film Festival in Switzerland, the film was not received well by German critics, who did not appreciate the representation of German citizens abroad.

In 2000, he directed Das Himmler-Projekt (The Himmler Project), a three-hour documentary reenacting the secret speech Heinrich Himmler gave to the high-ranking SS generals in Poznan, Poland on October 4, 1943. The film features Manfred Zapatka reading the dark speech aloud, and this served as the aesthetic basis for Karmakar's later film, Hamburger Lektionen (also starring Manfred Zapatka). Das Himmler-Projekt was named one of the top 250 most important post-1980 artistic acquisitions by MoMA in 2008.

During the 2000s, Karmakar filmed in the German electronic music scene, a large and influential piece of German youth culture that has not been given great attention by filmmakers. His work in the electronic music scene led to the creation of what would later be referred to as the Club Land Trilogy, consisting of 196 BPM, Between the Devil and the Wide Blue Sea, and Villalobos. The films are distinguished by Karmakar's use of a hand-held camera and shooting in plansequences, or long, uninterrupted takes. Karmakar's use of plansequence was motivated by a drive to show the musician in greater focus with the hope of revealing more about what is behind the song. The three films of the trilogy explore different aspects of the electronic music scene: 196 BPM showcases DJ Hell during the Love Parade of 2002, Between the Devil and the Wide Blue Sea follows nine bands including Fixmer/McCarthy, Alter Ego, Rechenzentrum, and Tarwater, and Villalobos focuses entirely on the famed DJ Ricardo Villalobos. Villalobos has yet to be released due to conflicts with music licensing.

In 2004, Karmakar presented two films at the Berlin International Film Festival: Nightsongs, a fictional film starring Frank Giering and Anne Ratte-Polle based on a play written by Norwegian writer Jon Fosse, and Land of Extermination, a documentary following research being done for a separate fictional film on the crimes of the Hamburg Police Battalion 101 in the former District of Lublin during German Occupation of Poland in the 1940s. Ordinary Men, a historical book written by Christopher Browning, brought the Battalion to popular attention during the 1990s.

After the 2005 London bombings, Karmakar encountered an article written about Imam Mohammed Fazazi of the Al-Quds Mosque in Hamburg, which led to the film Hamburger Lektionen, premiered in Berlin in 2006. Several confirmed terrorists involved in the 9/11 attacks had frequently visited this mosque to hear lectures delivered by Fazazi. These lectures were videotaped and distributed to the members of the mosque, and in Karmakar's film, two of these lectures, delivered originally in January 2000, are read aloud by actor Manfred Zapatka. The film's simple structure focuses the viewer's attention on the spoken content of the speeches.

In 2008 and 2009, Karmakar participated in three collaborative works. He contributed to Germany 09, a project intended to capture how filmmakers think about current day Germany, created and produced by Tom Tykwer (Cloud Atlas). Karmakar's contribution was a film about Ramses, the eccentric owner of a declining burlesque bar in West Berlin. Karmakar also contributed to Fruits of Confidence, a project produced and directed by Alexander Kluge, a highly influential figure in postwar German cinema. Fruits of Confidence poses questions regarding who can be trusted during the 2008 financial crisis. Karamakar's contributory short film was titled Ralf Otterpohl, Wasserspezialist, and features interviews with a professor from Hamburg, who is an expert in water treatment. Karmakar also contributed to 24h Berlin, a 24-hour television program featuring the work 60 film directors on the life of Berlin in one day. His film focused on DJ Ricardo Villalobos, and this material became the basis for the full-length film Villalobos, which was premiered in 2009. That same year, he was elected member of the Academy of Arts in Berlin.

At the Venice Film Festival in September 2011, Karmakar presented The Flock of the Lord, a documentary featuring footage from Rome following the death of Pope John Paul II and from the hometown of his successor, Pope Benedict XVI, during his election.

Karmakar's work has been shown in several retrospectives, such as Cinéma du Réel (2007), Centre Pompidou (2006), BAFICI in Buenos Aires (2008), Vienna Filmmuseum (2010), the Cinémathèque in Vienna, and Jeonju Film Festival in South Korea (2010).

In June 2013, Karmakar participated in the Venice Biennale, an esteemed, international contemporary art exhibition held in Venice once every two years. Susanne Gaensheimer, Director of the MMK Museum fur Moderne Kunst Frankfurt am Main selected Karmakar along with Ai Weiwei, Santu Mofokeng, and Dayanita Singh to represent Germany with artistic exhibitions at the German Pavilion. Each artist was selected for the strong German and international influences present in their work.

Karmakar has found critical praise for his attention to the harsh realities of modern history. His films bring his audiences to consider the imperfections of society in current times and across the last century, particularly by focusing on the perpetrators of injustice and crime. Karmakar's selection for the Venice Art Biennale is also connected to his unique attention to those responsible for the downfalls of society.

Karmakar is currently a Fellow at the Radcliffe Institute for Advanced Study at Harvard University in Cambridge, Massachusetts.

== Filmography ==
- The Invisible Zoo (2024) Director, producer, editor
- Democracy under Attack – An Intervention ("Angriff auf die Demokratie – Eine Intervention") (2012) Director, producer, editor
- The Flock of the Lord ("Die Herde des Herrn") (2011) – director, producer, co-editor, cinematographer
- Donkey with Snow ("Esel mit Schnee") (2010) – director, producer, editor, cinematographer
- Fruits of Confidence ("Früchte des Vertrauens"), by Alexander Kluge (2009) – director, research, conception of the segment: Ein Mann Unseres Vertrauens
- Ralf Otterpohl, Wasserspezialist (2008)
- Villalobos (2009) – director, producer, co-editor, co-cinematographer
- Germany 09: 13 Short Films About the State of the Nation ("Deutschland 09: 13 kurze Filme zur Lage der Nation") (2009) – director, co-editor, research, conception of the segment: Ramses
- 24h Berlin, by Volker Heise (2008) – director, research, conception of the segment: DJ Ricardo Villalobos
- Hamburg Lectures ("Hamburger Lektionen") (2006) – Director, producer, co-editor, co-writer, research, conception
- Between the Devil and the Wide Blue Sea (2005) – Director, producer, cinematographer, co-editor
- Land of Annihilation ("Land der Vernichtung") (2003) – Director, producer, cinematographer, co-editor, research, conception
- Nightsongs ("Die Nacht singt ihre Lieder") (2003) – Director, producer, co-writer
- The Night of Yokohama ("Die Nacht von Yokohama") (2002) – Director, producer, cinematographer
- 196 BPM (2002) – Director, producer, cinematographer, co-editor
- Das Himmler-Projekt ("Das Himmler-Projekt") (2000) – Director, producer, co-writer, co-editor, research, conception
- Manila (2000) – Director, producer, co-writer
- Frankfurt Millennium ("Das Frankfurter Kreuz") (1998) – Director, co-writer, made for 2000, Seen By...
- Deathmaker ("Der Totmacher") (1995) – Director, producer, co-writer
- Infight (1994) – Director, producer, research, conception
- The Tyrann of Torino ("Der Tyrann von Turin") (2001) – Director, producer, writer, S-8 camera, research, conception
- Warheads (1993) – Director, co-editor, Hi-8 camera, research, conception
- Demontage IX – Opersation Steelbell ("Demontage IX, Unternehmen Stahlglocke") (1991) – Director, producer, co-editor
- Munich-Berlin-Munich: The Film Critic Michael Althen ("München-Berlin-München: Der Filmkritiker Michael Althen") (1991) – Director, producer, conception
- Sam Shaw on John Cassavetes (1993) – Director, producer, co-editor, cinematographer, research, conception
- Mixwix, by Herbert Achternbusch (1989) – Assistant director
- Dogs of Velvet and Steel ("Hunde aus Samt und Stahl") (1989) – Director, producer, co-editor, research, conception
- Author’s Bookshop ("Mappa Master: Harmut Geerken, Autorenbuchhandlung") (1989) – Director, producer, conception
- Gallodrome (1989) – Director, producer, co-editor, research, conception
- Hellman Rider (1989) – Co-director with Ulrich von Berg, producer, cinematographer, research, conception
- Coup de Boule (1987) – Director, producer, co-editor, S-8 camera
- A Friendship in Germany ("Eine Freundschaft in Deutschland") (1985) – Director, producer, editor, S-8 camera, actor, research, conception
- Lonesome Cowboys ("Einsame Cowboys"), by Anatol Nitschke (1984) – Actor
- Candy Girl (completed 1984, premiered 2001) – Director, producer, editor, S-8 camera

== Radio Plays ==
- 2008: "Hey, stop smirking!" – Fragments of the Stammheim Trial ("'Na, hören Sie doch mal auf zu grinsen!' – Fragmente des Stammheim-Prozesses"; 51 min; broadcast premiere: 11/23/2008, WDR (West German Public Radio, Cologne))
- 1997: Das Warheads-Oratorium (66 min; broadcast premiere: 11/28/1997, BR 2 (Bavarian Public Radio, Munich))
- 1993: Night over Gospič ("Nacht über Gospič"; 41 min; broadcast premiere: 07/02/1993, BR 2 (Bavarian Public Radio, Munich))

== Honors and awards ==
- Invited to the German Pavilion at the Art Venice Biennale, 2013, together with Ai Weiwei, Santu Mofokeng and Dayanita Singh.
- Fellow at the Radcliffe Institute for Advanced Study at Harvard University, 2012–2013
- Member of the Jury for the art competition of "NS-Dokumentationszentrum München“, 2012
- Jury President of "Dialogue en perspective“ in the Perspektive Deutsches Kino section of the Berlin Int. Film Festival, 2011
- Retrospective at the Jeonju Int. Film Festival, Korea, 2010
- Retrospective at the Austrian Film Museum, Vienna, 2010
- Member of the Berlin Academy of the Arts since 2009
- Das Himmler Projekt is selected to the "MoMA Highlight"-list as one of "250 important works of art that have been made, and acquired by the Museum since 1980", New York, 2008
- Retrospective at BAFICI (Buenos Aires Int. Film Festival for Independent Cinema), 2008
- Member of the International Jury of the 60th Locarno Int. Film Festival, 2007
- Tribute with 20 feature length and short films at Cinema du Réel, Centre Pompidou, Paris, 2007
- 3sat Award for Best German language Documentary, for HAMBURGER LEKTIONEN, Duisburger Filmwoche, 2006
- arte-Documentary Award, for Between the Devil and the Wide Blue Sea, Duisburger Filmwoche, 2005
- "Mention Speciale“, for Between the Devil and the Wide Blue Sea, Locarno Int. Film Festival, 2005
- Retrospective at the Munich Film Museum, 2004
- Tribute with 8 films at the American Cinematheque, Los Angeles, 2002
- Adolf-Grimme-Award Spezial, for Das Himmler-Projekt, Marl, 2002
- Retrospective at the Pesaro Int. Film Festival, 2001
- 3sat Award for Best German language Documentary, for Das Himmler-Projekt, Duisburger Filmwoche, 2000 CV. Karmakar 2
- Silver Leopard, for Manila, Locarno Int. Film Festival, 2000
- Bavarian Film Awards, Best Script, for Manila, 2000
- German Film Award for Best Fiction Film in Gold, Best Director, Best Actor, for Der Totmacher, 1996
- Nominated for the European Film Awards, Young Film, for Der Totmacher, 1995
- Hessian Film Award, for Der Totmacher, 1995
- Coppa-Volpi-Award, Best Actor, for Der Totmacher, Venice Int. Film Festival, 1995
- Best German Short Film, for Demontage IX, Unternehmen Stahlglocke, Oberhausen Int. Short Film Festival, 1991
- Advancement Award (Förderpreis) of the City of Munich, for Demontage IX, Unternehmen Stahlglocke, 1991
- Tribute at the Max-Ophüls Film Festival, Saarbrücken, 1990
- Tribute at the Munich Filmmuseum, 1989
