= Karina Kraushaar =

German television actress

- Born: 9 April 1971; Eilenburg, Bezirk Leipzig, East Germany
- Died: 5 March 2015 (aged 43); Hamburg, Germany
- Occupation(s): Nurse, model, actress, painter

Karina Kraushaar (9 April 1971 – 5 March 2015) was a German television actress, painter, and trained nurse. She was primarily known for her performances in German soap operas such as Die Rettungsflieger, Für alle Fälle Stefanie, Leipzig Homicide and Hallo Robbie!

Initially educated as a nurse, Karina Kraushaar started a career as a photo model in 1992. In 1997 she took acting and diction at the Stage School of Hamburg and began to appear on German television in a variety of roles. She played in the series Alphateam, Der Bulle von Tölz, Stubbe – Von Fall zu Fall, Klinik unter Palmen, Alarm für Cobra 11 and the Rosamunde-Pilcher-movie Blumen im Regen.

In the ZDF-Series Hallo Robbie! she played a marine biologist called Carla Dux. She also hosted the television show Love Stories.

Kraushaar was found unconscious in her apartment in Hamburg-Eppendorf on 5 March 2015. She died the same day due to multiple organ failure at the University Medical Center Hamburg-Eppendorf.
