= 3 Türken und ein Baby =

2015 film directed by Sinan Akkuş

- Directed by: Sinan Akkuş
- Written by: Sinan Akkuş, Daniel Ehrenberg, Thorsten Wettcke
- Produced by: Daniel Ehrenberg, Judy Tossell
- Starring: Kida Khodr Ramadan, Eko Fresh, Kostja Ullmann
- Cinematography: Armin Franzen
- Edited by: Martin Wolf
- Distributed by: Wild Bunch (Germany, theatrical), EuroVideo (Germany, DVD and Blu-ray), Netflix (Australia, video and VOD)
- Release date: 22 January 2015
- Running time: 95 minutes
- Country: Germany
- Language: German

3 Türken und ein Baby or 3 Türken & ein Baby (English: 3 Turks and a baby) is a 2015 German comedy film, written and directed by Sinan Akkuş. Starring the German rapper Eko Fresh and the actors Kida Khodr Ramadan and Kostja Ullmann, the film tells the story of the three Yildiz brothers Celal, Sami and Mesut, who live under one roof and lead a chaotic bachelor life. That changes suddenly, when a little baby comes into their lives that they have to take care of. In 2015 3 Türken und ein Baby was nominated for the Civis Media Prize for Integration.

== Plot ==
The three German-Turkish brothers Celal, Sami and Mesut are in their thirties and still live together in their parents' small apartment in Frankfurt am Main, running the inherited bridal fashion store without success. Womanizer Celal cannot get over the separation from his ex-girlfriend Anna and wants to open a mobile phone shop, but has gambled away their joint inheritance. Sami longs for a wife. However, his first dates often go down the drain because of his quickly budding rage. The youngest brother, Mesut, is a hopeless romantic and dreams of a career as a successful musician. However, this does not fit in with his recent decision, which is to adhere to the rules of the Quran.

The brothers' situation worsens when they suddenly have to take care of Anna's baby when she is hospitalized. With help from Sami and Mesut, Celal tries to fulfill his duties as a surrogate father. After a chaotic start, the three brothers learn to take responsibility and to take on the busy duties of a father. They begin to enjoy the company of their little foster baby.

== Cast ==
- Kostja Ullmann as Celal Yildiz
- Kida Khodr Ramadan as Sami Yildiz
- Eko Fresh as Mesut Yildiz
- Jytte-Merle Böhrnsen as Anna Kemper
- Baby Clara as Baby Nala
- Axel Stein as Gunnar Caro
- Frederick Lau as Matthias
- Rainer Ewerrien as Sven
- Dagmar von Kurmin as Elena Krause
- Christoph Maria Herbst as Director of operations
- Bodo Bach as Neighbor
- Anna Böger as Laura
- Jacob Matschenz as Caspar
- Hans Sarpei as Balthasar
- Simon Desue as Man at the swimming pool
- Joyce Ilg as Woman at playground
- Julia Thurnau as Helgart
- Alexander Beyer as Holzapfel
- Stefan Lampadius as Pharmacist
- Jörg Schäfer as Boss
- Dieter Rupp as County Court bailiff
- Sinan Akkuş as Policeman
- Celo & Abdi as Car dealers
- Sabine Wackernagel as Doctor

== Release ==
The German theatrical release took place on 22 January 2015. Netflix started streaming the film on 15 December 2016 in the United States for the first time, on 1. September 2018 in Germany and in several other countries.

== Accolades ==
- 2015: Nomination for the Civis Media Prize in the category CIVIS European Cinema Prize
