= Jochen Nickel =

German actor (born 1959)

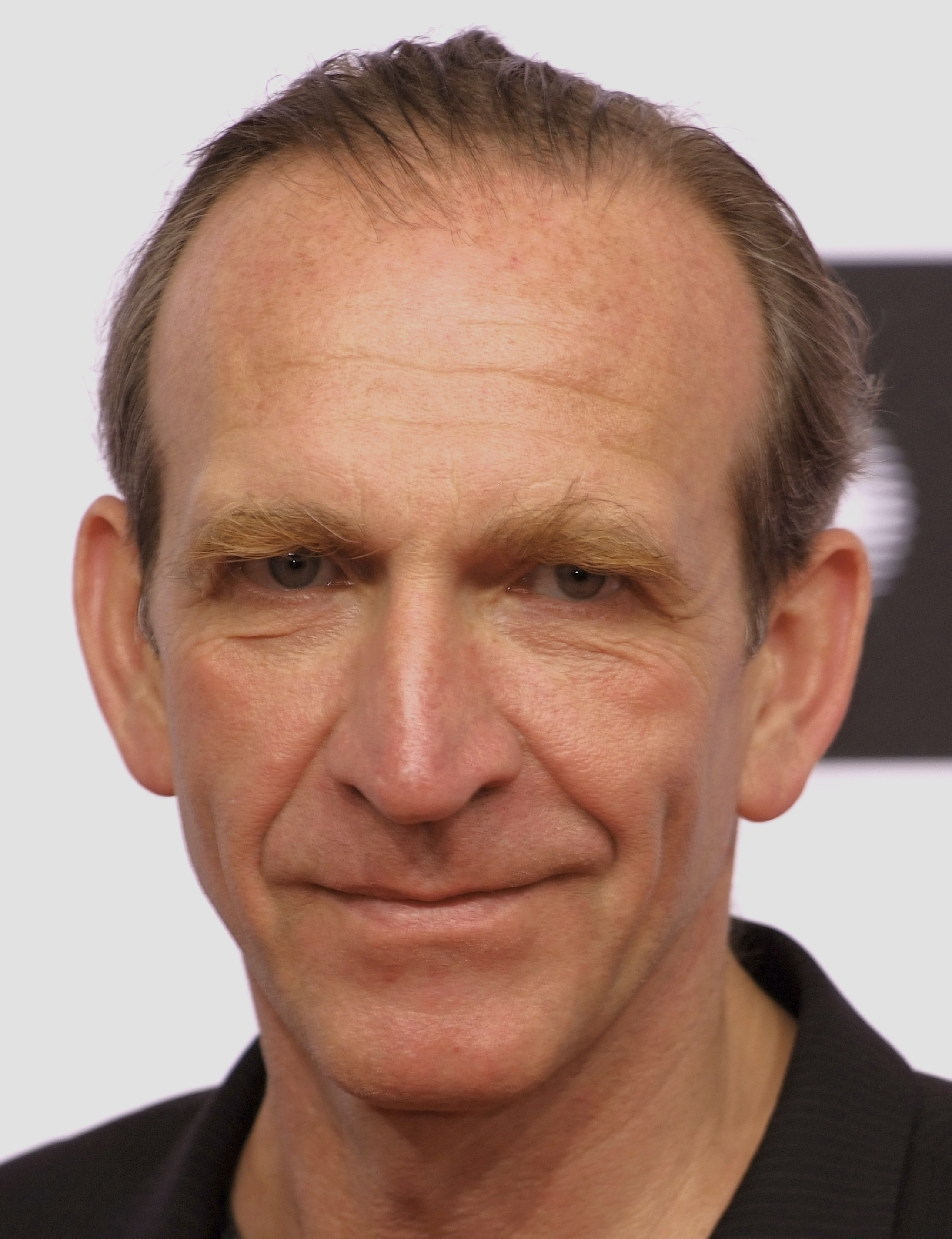
- Nickel in 2012
- Born: 10 April 1959 (age 67); Witten, North Rhine-Westphalia, West Germany
- Occupation: Actor
- Years active: 1981–present

Jochen Nickel (born 10 April 1959) is a German actor. He has appeared in more than 160 films and TV series since 1988.

== Life ==
Nickel, a trained road builder, came to the stage in 1981 and was a member of the theater group Theaterpathologisches Institut in Hattingen and Lünen until 1987. He gave his television debut in 1988 in the Breakfast for Enemies by Norbert Kerkhey and Jochen Baier. In 1993 he was seen in Joseph Vilsmaiers anti-war film Stalingrad as Unteroffizier Rohleder. In the same year, Nickel had a supporting role in Schindler's List as Hauptscharführer Wilhelm Kunde. Numerous roles in film and television followed, where he often played the role of villains, robbers or striking Ruhrpott characters, but also comedic roles are not uncommon.

He was in a relationship with Sonja Kirchberger from 2001 to 2012 and lives in Witten.

== Filmography ==
Year	Title	Role	Notes
1990	Moon 44	Scooter Bailey	
1990	Spieler	Taxifahrer	
1991	Manta – Der Film	Fahrlehrer	
1992	Happy Birthday, Turk!	Fixer	
1992	North Curve	Trainer	
1993	Stalingrad	Cpl. Manfred 'Rollo' Rohleder	
1993	Making Up!	Party Tier (Party Animal)	
1993	The Last Border	Beggar	
1993	Schindler's List	Hauptscharführer Wilhelm Kunde	
1994	The High Crusade	Soldier in Love / Saracen	
1995	One of My Oldest Friends	Manuel	
1995	Der Leihmann	Rocker	
1995	Brother of Sleep	Köhler Michel	
1995	Heaven or Bust	Lennox	
1996	The Killer's Mother	Lu Mehlig	
1996	Gefährliche Orte – Bombenleger		
1996	Durchgebraten	Lukas	
1997	Still Movin	Willy Freeze	
1997	Comedian Harmonists	Hehler	
1997	Trickser	Bingo	TV film
1997	Frankfurt Millennium	Mannie	
1998	Trains'n'Roses	Lothar	
1999	Gomez – Kopf oder Zahl		
1999	Bang Boom Bang	Franky	
1999	Absolute Giganten	Snake	
1999	Gangster	Kubel	
1999	Waschen, schneiden, legen	Trucker	
2000	Highway Society	Popo	
2000	Double Pack	Horst	
2000	In July	Leo	
2001	Planet Alex	Geschäftsmann	
2001	Honolulu	Horst	
2001	Leo & Claire	Paul Steinheil	
2001	Auf Herz und Nieren	Fialka	
2001	Mindstorm	Hans Martina	
2002	Elephant Heart	Axel Stemper	
2003	Der Fluch des schwarzen Schwans	Oliver	
2003	NeuFundLand	Robert	
2004	Edelweiss Pirates	Josef Hoegen	
2004	Super Monkey	Doctor	
2005	Wahrheit oder Pflicht	Bernd Schmelzer	
2005	Felix – Ein Hase auf Weltreise	Yeti / Butler	Voice
2006	A Pirate's Heart	Gödeke Michels	TV film
2010	We Are the Night	Bewährungshelfer	
2011	The Crocodiles: All for One	Vater Frank	
2011	Werner – Eiskalt!	Herbert	
2013	Dear Courtney	Knochen	
2013	The Beautiful Spy	Walther Luthmann	TV film
2014	Bocksprünge	Barmann	
2016	Gut zu Vögeln	Merlins Papa	
2016	Radio Heimat	Franks Onkel	
2018	Warum?	Waltrauts Mann	
