= Leo & Claire =

- German: Leo und Claire
- Directed by: Joseph Vilsmaier
- Written by: Joseph Vilsmaier; Reinhard Klooss; Klaus Richter
- Based on: Der Jude und das Madchen by Christiane Kohl
- Produced by: Joseph Vilsmaier
- Starring: Michael Degen; Suzanne von Borsody
- Cinematography: Joseph Vilsmaier
- Edited by: Hans Funck
- Production companies: Odeon Film; Perathon Film
- Distributed by: Bavaria Film
- Release date: 27 August 2001 (Montreal World Film Festival)
- Running time: 103 minutes
- Country: Germany
- Language: German

Leo & Claire (German: Leo und Claire) is a 2001 German historical drama film produced, written and directed by Joseph Vilsmaier and starring Michael Degen and Suzanne von Borsody. The film competed at the Montreal World Film Festival on 27 August 2001.

== Plot ==
Nuremberg, 1933. Leo Katzenberger, a Jewish businessman, runs a shoe business from his flat. He loves his wife Claire, as well as their daughters, and other family members. It all seems to be that nothing can ruin their life together, until blond beauty Irene Scheffler, a model, decides to open a photography studio next to him. As time goes by, Irene and Leo start to get closer, resulting in a cosy and platonic friendship. Due to his failure to be discreet in his affair, Leo is arrested, tried and then executed in a process that became known as the Katzenberger Trial.

== Cast ==
- Michael Degen as Leo Katzenberger
- Suzanne von Borsody as Claire Katzenberger
- Franziska Petri as Irene Scheffler
- Alexandra Maria Lara as Käthe Katzenberger
- Axel Milberg as Maisel
- Jochen Nickel as Paul Steinheil
- Andrea Sawatzki as Helga Steinheil
- Dietmar Schönherr as Dr. Richard Iphraim Herz
- Jürgen Schornagel as Dr. Oswald Rothaug
- Jasmin Schwiers as Lilo Katzenberger
  - Alice Treff as old Lilo Katzenberger
- Rüdiger Vogler as Max Katzenberger
- Kai Wiesinger as Irene Seiler
- Roland Beiküfner as Beamter
- Michael Brandner as Fritz Haeberlein
- Michael Hanemann as Otto Ehrlicher
- Alexander Held as Gauleiter
- Andreas Hofer as Hermann Markl
- Nina Hoger as Lisbeth Häberlein
- Nicky Kantor as Alex Häberlein
- Maximilian Krückl as Willi
- George Lenz as Bernhard Freimann
- Natalie Spinell as Magda Steinheil
- Julia Thurnau as reporter

== Reception ==
Jane Sumner stated in The Dallas Morning News, "if sometimes clumsy and confusing, the cast, especially Franziska Petri, who glows like a Renoir in the nude, glues it together". In a mostly negative review of the film, Variety's Eddie Cockrell wrote, "Large cast does the best it can with the extremely uneven dramatic tone and perfunctory direction. ... Tech credits are tops, as Vilsmaier — who operates his own camera — clearly knows how to capture pretty pictures. ... The knowledge of what to do with such images, however, continues to elude him." Daniel Rosenthal wrote that the film was "heavy-handed" and "examined the case of a German Jew executed for his alleged affair with an Aryan woman".

In a 2010 review, film critic Tobias Kniebe said, "Leo and Claire still achieves the goal of its makers—to be a film that keeps the memory of injustice alive". Dietrich Kuhlbrodt reviewed the film in the German film magazine epd Film in April 2002. The film was reviewed in the periodical Films of the Federal Republic of Germany (German: Filme der Bundesrepublik Deutschland).
