= La Maison du canal =

La Maison du canal (The House by the Canal) is a Franco-Belgian telefilm, directed by Alain Berliner, released in 2003. It is based on a novel by Georges Simenon. Its running time is 94 minutes.

== Technical details ==
- Director: Alain Berliner
- Written : Dominique Garnier and Alain Berliner, based on the novel by Georges Simenon
- Music : Vincent D'Hondt
- Date of release: 24 February 2003

== Starring ==
- Isild Le Besco : Edmée
- Corentin Lobet : Jeff
- Nicolas Buysse : Fred
- Jean-Pierre Cassel : Louis
- Gert Portael : Jeanne
- Circé Lethem : Mia
- Joyce Bachely : Mieke
- Camie Boel : Alice
- Luc Bromagne : Le docteur
- Sébastien Waroquier : André
- Michel Angely : Le père
- Daniel Vidovsky : Le jeune homme
