= Familie Sonnenfeld =

- Starring: Marion Kracht
- Country of origin: Germany

Original release
- Release: 2005 – 2009

Familie Sonnenfeld was a German TV movie series produced from 2005–2008. The series was directed by Christina Kabisch.

Family Sonnenfeld was broadcast on the ARD and ORF.

== See also ==
- List of German television series
