= After Five in the Forest Primeval =

1996 film by Hans-Christian Schmid

- Promotional poster
- Directed by: Hans-Christian Schmid
- Written by: Hans-Christian Schmid; David Howard
- Starring: Franka Potente; Axel Milberg; Dagmar Manzel; Farina Brock
- Cinematography: Klaus Eichhammer
- Edited by: Hansjörg Weißbrich
- Music by: Rainer Michel
- Production company: Arte
- Distributed by: Senator Film
- Release date: 25 April 1996
- Running time: 99 minutes
- Country: Germany
- Language: German
- Box office: 570,000 admissions (Germany)

After Five in the Forest Primeval (German: Nach Fünf im Urwald), sometimes also known as It's a Jungle Out There, is a 1995 German romantic comedy film directed by Hans-Christian Schmid and starring Franka Potente in her first film role. The film tells the story of 17-year-old Anna who, in search of freedom in an urban environment, runs away from home with a boy who has a crush on her. Her parents launch into a search for Anna and, during the process, reminisce about their own search for freedom in their youth.

The film was intended to be a television film and had a screening in October 1995 at the Hof International Film Festival where Hans-Christian Schmid was awarded the Best New Director Promotional Award (also known as Eastman Support Prize for Up-and-Coming Talent). During the festival, the German distributing company Senator Film picked up the film for theatrical distribution and the film opened in German theaters on April 25, 1996. At the 1996 Bavarian Film Awards, Franka Potente won the award for Best Young Actress. The film was also nominated for accolades at the 1997 Bavarian Film Awards where it won the award for Best Production.

== Cast ==
- Franka Potente as Anna
- Axel Milberg as Wolfgang
- Dagmar Manzel as Karin
- Farina Brock as Clara
- Sibylle Canonica as Johanna
- Peter Ender as Oliver
- Max Urlacher as Ben
- Thomas Schmauser as Simon
- Johann von Bülow as Nick
- Julia Thurnau as Mick's friend

== See also ==
- 1995 in film
- List of German films of the 1990s
