= Liebe, Babys und ein großes Herz =

- Starring: Marion Kracht
- Country of origin: Germany

Liebe, Babys und ein großes Herz is a German television series.
