= Betrayal (2012 film) =

2012 film

- Film poster
- Directed by: Kirill Serebrennikov
- Starring: Franziska Petri
- Release date: 29 August 2012 (Venice)
- Running time: 115 minutes
- Country: Russia
- Language: Russian

Betrayal (Russian: Измена, romanized: Izmena) is a 2012 Russian drama film directed by Kirill Serebrennikov. The film was selected to compete for the Golden Lion at the 69th Venice International Film Festival. At the 2012 Abu Dhabi Film Festival, Franziska Petri won the award for Best Actress.

== Plot ==
Two random acquaintances learn that their spouses are lovers. This discovery makes them act in a way they would not have dared earlier.

== Cast ==
- Albina Dzhanabaeva (first wife)
- Dejan Lilic (men)
- Franziska Petri (women)
- Artūrs Skrastiņš (second husband)
- Svetlana Mamresheva (second wife)
- Andrei Shchetinin (first husband)
- Guna Zarina (Investigator)
- Yakov Levada (son)
- Arthur Beschastny (interrogator)
- Alexandra Nesterova (girl)
- Lera Gorin (expert)
- Olga Albanova (mother of the girl)
- Lydia Bayrashevskaya (realtor)
- Valentina Ivanova (woman at the funeral)
- Denis Varenov (officer at the funeral)
- Alexey Torgunakov (manager at the motel)
