= Deathmaker =

1995 film

- Theatrical release poster
- Directed by: Romuald Karmakar
- Written by: Romuald Karmakar; Michael Farin
- Produced by: Christian Granderath; Gebhard Henke; Romuald Karmakar; Thomas Schühly
- Starring: Götz George; Jürgen Hentsch; Pierre Franckh
- Cinematography: Fred Schuler
- Edited by: Peter Przygodda
- Production company: Pantera Film
- Distributed by: Warner Bros.
- Release date: 23 November 1995
- Running time: 115 minutes
- Country: Germany
- Language: German

Deathmaker (German: Der Totmacher) is a 1995 German film directed by Romuald Karmakar and starring Götz George, Jürgen Hentsch and Pierre Franckh. The film is based on the transcripts of the interrogation of the notorious serial killer Fritz Haarmann.

The film received several awards and nominations. The film was awarded the Deutscher Filmpreis Best Feature Film, Deutscher Filmpreis Best Direction and Deutscher Filmpreis Best Actor in 1996. Götz George also won the Volpi Cup at the Venice Film Festival for his role. It was chosen as Germany's official submission to the 69th Academy Awards for Best Foreign Language Film, but did not manage to receive a nomination.

== Cast ==
- Götz George - Fritz Haarmann
- Jürgen Hentsch - Prof. Dr. Ernst Schultze
- Pierre Franckh - Stenograph
- Hans-Michael Rehberg - Kommissar Rätz
- Matthias Fuchs - Dr. Machnik
- Marek Harloff - Fürsorgezögling Kress

== See also ==
- List of submissions to the 69th Academy Awards for Best Foreign Language Film
- List of German submissions for the Academy Award for Best Foreign Language Film
