= Anja Jaenicke =

German actress (born 1963)

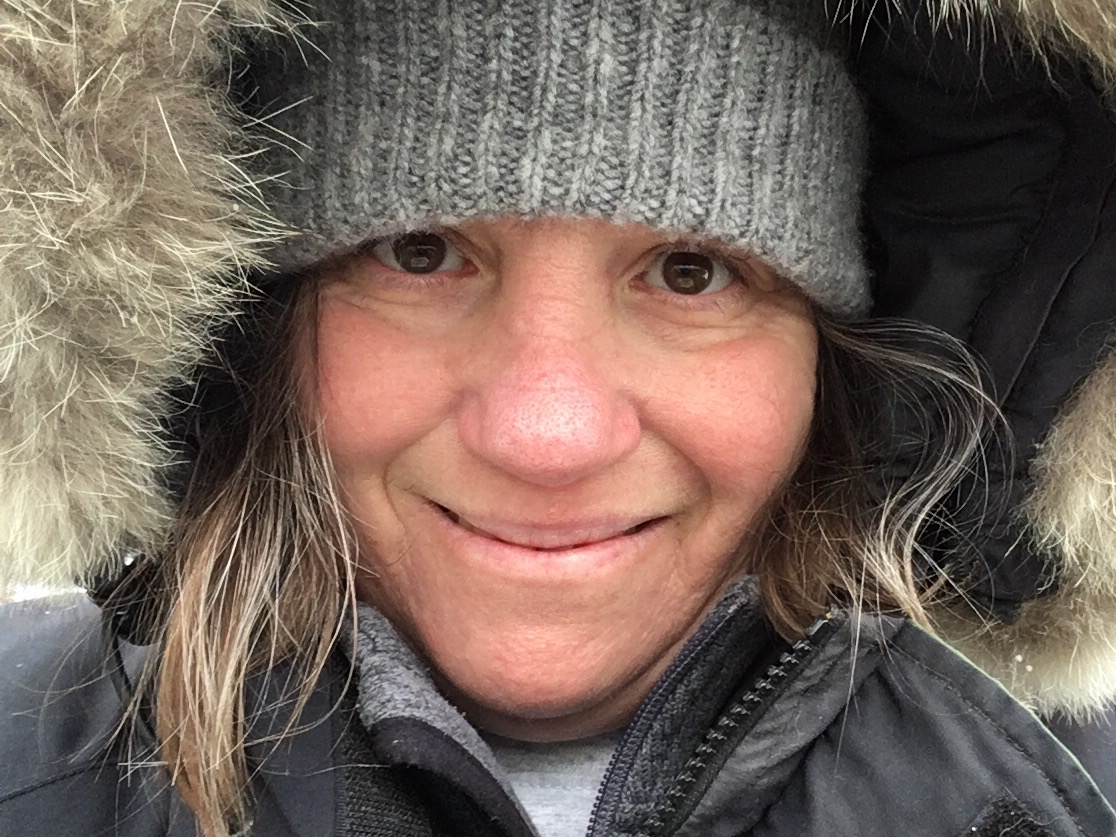
- Jaenicke
- Born: 9 October 1963 (age 62); West Berlin, West Germany

Anja Jaenicke (born 9 October 1963) is a German actress working mostly in German television and film.

== Selected filmography ==
- 1973: Was sagst du dazu?: "Heimkind" (TV)
- 1979: David
- 1980: Tatort: "Herzjagd" (TV)
- 1982: Ein Stück Himmel (TV miniseries)
- 1982: Tatort: "Das Mädchen auf der Treppe" (TV)
- 1982: Hellseher wider Willen (TV series, 8 episodes)
- 1983: Hanna von acht bis acht (TV film)
- 1983: The Swing
- 1983: Landluft (TV series, 18 episodes)
- 1984: Derrick: "Das Mädchen in Jeans" (TV)
- 1984: Mensch Bachmann (TV series, 6 episodes)
- 1984: The Old Fox: "Von Mord war nicht die Rede" (TV)
- 1985: Die Försterbuben (TV film)
- 1985: Die Unbekannten im eigenen Haus (TV film)
- 1985: Abschied in Berlin (TV film)
- 1985: Die Küken kommen
- 1985: Derrick: "Raskos Kinder" (TV)
- 1986: Tatort: "Die kleine Kanaille" (TV)
- 1986: Wahnfried
- 1987: Otto: The New Movie
- 1987: The Old Fox: "Alibi Mozart" (TV)
- 1988: The Old Fox: "Der Freispruch" (TV)
- 1990–94: Diese Drombuschs (TV series, 18 episodes)
- 1990: Hotel Paradies (TV series, 9 episodes)
- 1991: Weißblaue Geschichten: "Der Kakadu" (TV)
- 1992: SOKO München: "Jedes Rennen gegen den Tod" (TV)
- 1994: Tatort: "Der Rastplatzmörder" (TV)
- 1997: Röpers letzter Tag (TV film)
- 2016: The Mirror Image of Being (director)

== Awards ==
Bavarian Film Award, Bambi Award, Deutscher Darstellerpreis

== Theatre ==
- 1980 The merry wives of Windsor by Shakespeare
- 1982 Stella by Goethe
- 1983 The little girl at the end of the lane by Nicolas Gessner

== Writings ==
- 2002 "Das Gewicht meiner Frau" Essays
- 2007/8 "Eagelsdance"/WGA screenplay
- 2009 "Die Nabelschnur" novel
- 2010 "The Umbilical Cord" screenplay
- 2014 "Ajna-The Book of Immortality"
- 2014 "The Perfect Job"WGD Treatment
- 2015 " Genius" AKA documentary
