= The Wall (1998 Belgian film) =

1998 film

Le Mur
- Directed by: Alain Berliner
- Written by: Alain Berliner
- Produced by: Arte France, Haut et Court
- Starring: Daniel Hanssens; Pascale Bal
- Music by: Alain Debaisieux
- Release date: 18 December 1998
- Running time: 65 min.
- Languages: Dutch, French

The Wall (original title Le Mur) is a 1998 Belgian tragicomedy film, directed by Alain Berliner for the 2000, Seen By... series. The story is a surreal satirical allegory of the bi-lingual problems in Belgium.

== Plot ==
Belgium, 1999. Albert is a 35-year old Walloon philosopher who works as a Belgian fries salesman. His store is located right on the Belgian language border. He serves his customers in Flanders and bakes his fries in Wallonia. Albert fancies the Flemish woman Wendy. After a new year celebration Albert wakes up and discovers to his horror that overnight a giant wall has been built on the language border, effectively separating Flanders from Wallonia. His store is therefore cut in half. As a citizen of Wallonia he is only able to travel to Flanders by using a visa...

== Production ==
The film was made for the 2000, Seen By... project, initiated by the French company Hout et Court to produce films depicting the approaching turn of the millennium seen from the perspectives of 10 different countries.

== Cast ==
- Daniel Hanssens: Albert
- Pascale Bal: Wendy
- Mil Seghers: Marcel
- Michael Pas: Stijn
- Peter Michel: Ivo
- Damien Gillard: Didier
- Peter Rouffaer: Fred
- Harry Cleven: Gréviste
- Dett Peyskens: Nicole
- Laurence Bibot: Journalist
- Daniël Van Avermaet: Negotiator
- Emile Ringoot: Soldier
- Bruno Van De Voorde: Flemish man
- François Lahaye: Walloon woman
- Julian Cope: Mel
- Michèle Laroque: The TV announcer
