= Grete Wurm =

German actress

Grete Wurm (8 June 1919 Wiesbaden - 28 March 2002 in Stuttgart; legal name: Margarethe Bauer-Wurm) was a German actress.

== Life ==
She received acting lessons in Munich after school. She made her debut in 1945 at the Hessisches Staatstheater Wiesbaden, where she remained until 1948.

This was followed by the Städtischen Bühnen Osnabrück and the Bühnen der Hansestadt Lübeck from 1948 to 1963, the Theater der Stadt Essen and the Deutsche Theater Göttingen from 1963 to 1969, the Bühnen der Stadt Köln from 1969 to 1978 and the Münchner Kammerspiele from 1978 to 1983. Guest performances took her to the Württembergische Staatstheater Stuttgart, the Bühnen der Stadt Bonn and in 1976 to the Gandersheimer Domfestspiele, where she was awarded the Roswitha-Ring in the same year.

She became known to a wide audience through the television series Diese Drombuschs in the role of Grandma Drombusch. In 1967, Grete Wurm was awarded the German Critics' Award.

She was used as a radio play speaker in countless productions, including one of the famous Paul Temple radio plays by WDR, namely in 1968 in Paul Temple and the Alex case.

Grete Wurm lived in Munich-Bogenhausen for a long time. She died of a heart attack in her hotel room in Stuttgart, where she was recording radio plays. She was cremated and the urn was buried in her native city of Wiesbaden.

== Filmography ==
- 1949: Mordprozess Dr. Jordan
- 1960: Das Land der Verheißung
- 1967: Celestina
- 1968: Heim und Herd
- 1969: Der Vetter Basilio (television two-parter)
- 1970: Like Lightning (three-parter)
- 1970: Das Mädchen meiner Träume
- 1972: Der Angestellte
- 1972: Sonderdezernat K1 - Mord im Dreivierteltakt (series)
- 1978: Späte Liebe
- 1979: Der Tote bin ich
- 1979: Anna (series)
- 1979: Merlin (Serie)
- 1980: Wochenendgeschichten
- 1980: Die Welt in jenem Sommer
- 1981: Polnischer Sommer
- 1981: Tatort - Grenzgänger
- 1982: Tatort - Blinde Wut
- 1983-1994: Diese Drombuschs (series, 39 episodes)
- 1987: Ein Stück vom Glück
- 1999: Einsatz Hamburg Süd - Allahs Vergeltung (series)
- 2000: Die Wache - Mondsüchtig (series)

== Radio plays ==
- 1979: Arno Holz: Die Blechschmiede Director: Heinz von Cramer. BR/RIAS/WDR
- 1986: Frank Manley: Sündflut (Oletta Crews) Directed by Dieter Carls. WDR
- 1988: Jean Paul: Himmelfahrt und Höllensturz des Luftschiffers Giannozzo (The Ripe Widow). Adapted and directed by Heinz von Cramer. BR/SDR
- 1991: Elfriede Jelinek: Burgteatta (Resi). Directed by Hans Gerd Krogmann. BR/ORF
- 1991: Karl-Heinz Bölling: Der Rentner - Regie: Hans Gerd Krogmann
- 1995: Hartmut Geerken: nach else lasker-schülers tragödie ich&ich (fällt der vorhang in herzform) BR. As podcast/download in the BR Hörspiel Pool.
- 1995: Ana Blandiana: Die Applausmaschine (Comrade Mardare). Directed by Jörg Jannings. BR/SWF
- 1998: Bruno Schulz: Wie Jakub, mein Vater, sich wegverwandelte von uns - Editing, direction and music collage: Heinz von Cramer (family drama - HR)

== Literature ==
- Hermann J. Huber: Langen Müller's Schauspielerlexikon der Gegenwart. Germany. Austria. Switzerland. Albert Langen - Georg Müller Verlag GmbH, Munich - Vienna 1986, ISBN 3-7844-2058-3, p. 1128.
