= Axel Milberg =

German actor (born 1956)

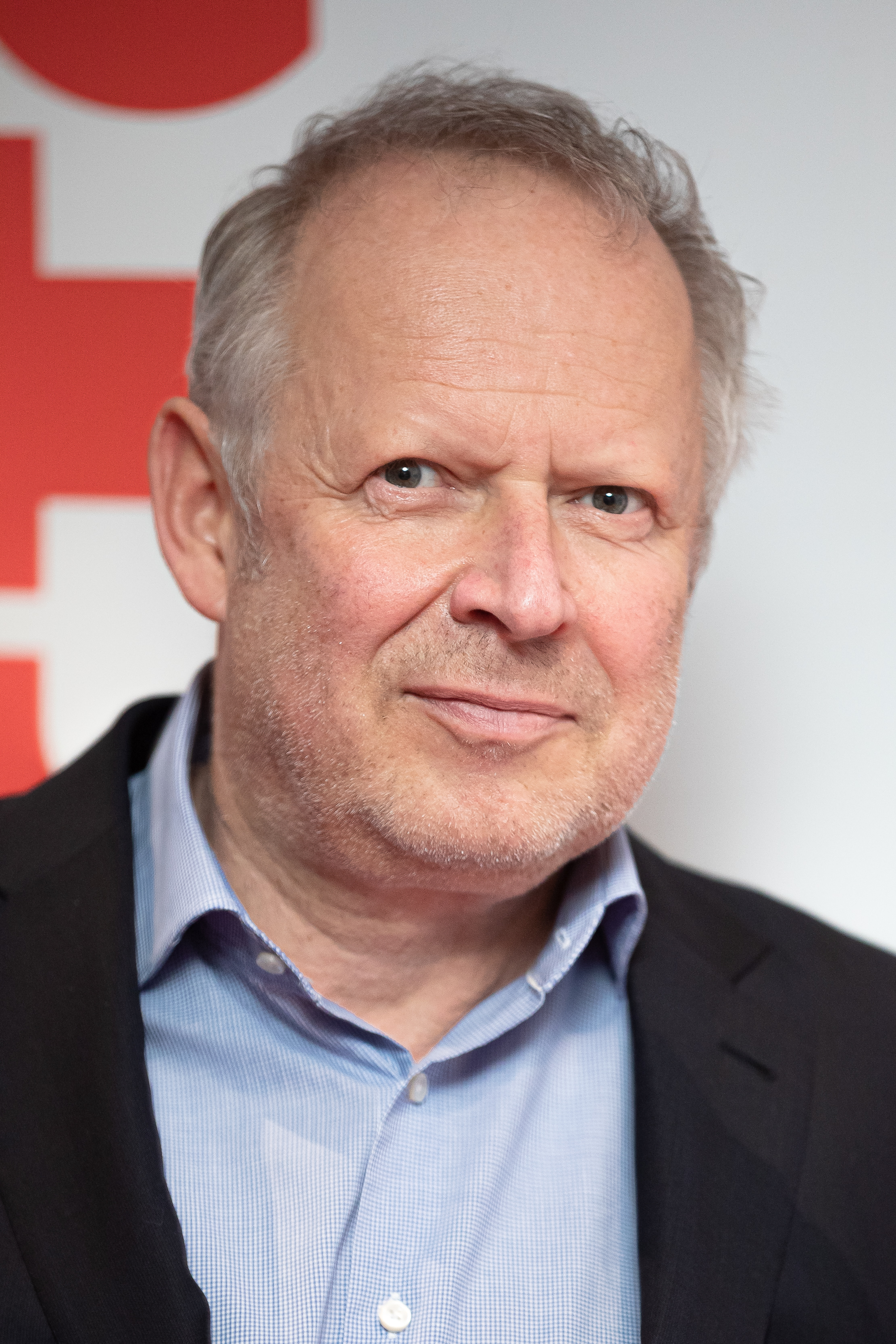
- Milberg in February 2019
- Born: 1 August 1956 (age 69); Kiel, West Germany

Axel Theodor Klaus Milberg (born 1 August 1956) is a German actor. His most prominent role is that of Tatort investigator Klaus Borowski.

== Selected filmography ==
- Winckelmann's Travels (1990)
- After Five in the Forest Primeval (1995)
- Rohe Ostern (1996)
- Father's Day (1996)
- It Happened in Broad Daylight (1997, TV film)
- Der Campus (1998)
- St. Pauli Night (1999)
- Leo & Claire (2001)
- The Man Next Door (2001, TV film)
- Tatort (since 2003, TV series)
- The Rose Gardener (2004, TV film)
- Spiele der Macht – 11011 Berlin (2005, TV film)
- The Next-Door Neighbour Is Alive (2005, TV film)
- The Lightship (2008, TV film)
- The International (2009)
- Eichmann's End: Love, Betrayal, Death (2010, TV film)
- Years of Love (2011, TV film)
- Hunkeler und die Augen des Ödipus (2012, TV film)
- Hannah Arendt (2012)
- Wetlands (2013)
- The Midwife (2014, TV film)
- Burning Souls (2014, TV film)
- Cape Town (2016, TV series)
- When Will It Be Again Like It Never Was Before (2023)
- Vienna Game (TBA)
