= Franziska Petri =

German actress (born 1973)

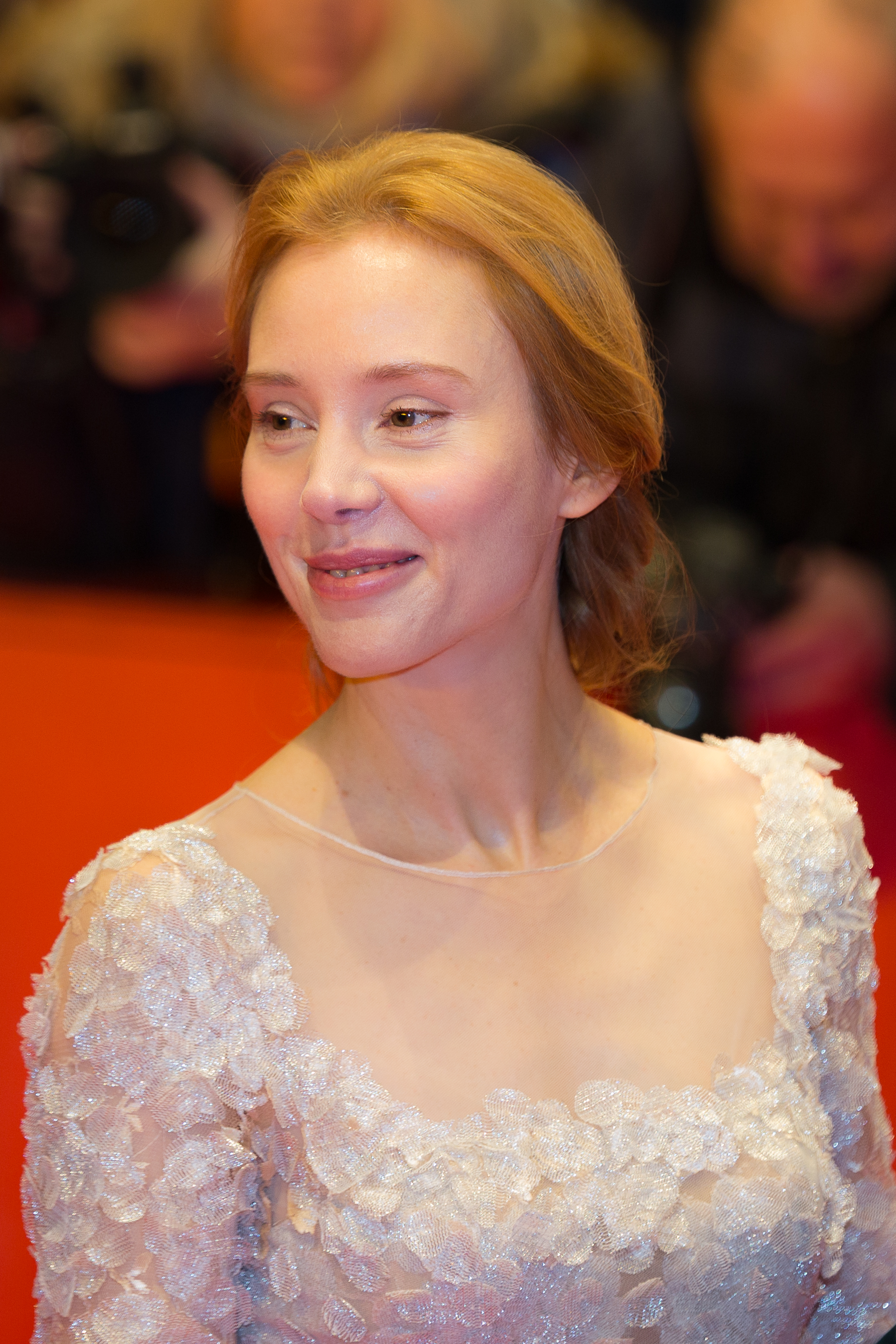
- Franziska Petri at the 67th Berlin International Film Festival
- Born: 17 August 1973 (age 53); Leipzig, East Germany
- Citizenship: Germany
- Occupation: Actress
- Years active: 1994-present
- Children: 1

Franziska Petri (born 17 August 1973) is a German actress.

== Biography ==
After ballet and vocal training in childhood, Franziska Petri attended the Ernst Busch Academy of Dramatic Arts in Berlin from 1992 to 1995 as a singer in several bands. In addition she is a skilled milliner. During drama studies she played at the Schiller Theater. Her first television role was a guest appearance in the Wolffs Revier series in 1993. After a few other television roles, she played her first film role in The Big Mambo in 1998.

To a wider audience, she became known in 2000 by the lead role in Vanessa Jopp's film Forget America. There followed other leading roles, such as 2001 in Joseph Vilsmaier's film Leo and Claire, in 2006 alongside Hanna Schygulla in the ARD TV movie The Unclean Time or in the films The Day I met my Dead Husband, Shadow World and For Miriam.

== Honours ==
For her leading role in the Russian feature film Betrayal, Petri was honored as the best actress at the Abu Dhabi Film Festival in 2012.

In 2017, she received the Best Actress award for portraying Sonja in Platonow at the VIFF Vienna Independent Film Festival.

== Personal life ==
She was married to her long-time co-star Uwe Kockisch from 1995 to 2005.

In 2010, she had her first child.

== Selected filmography ==
- 1994: Fire and Flame (TV; Director: Marion Sarraut)
- 1995: Operation Medusa (TV; Director: Thorsten Näter)
- 1998: The Big Mambo (Director: Michael Gwisdek)
- 1998: Rhapsody in Blood (TV; Director: Uwe Janson)
- 1999: Sabotage (Short Film; Director: Andi Niessner)
- 2000: Forget America (Director: Vanessa Jopp)
- 2000: The Most Beautiful Thing in the World: The Night Nurse (Director: Bernd Heiber)
- 2001: Leo & Claire (Director: Joseph Vilsmaier)
- 2003: Tage des Sturms (TV; Director: Thomas Freundner)
- 2004: Reason & Feeling (TV; Director: Dagmar Damek)
- 2004: The Account (TV; Director: Markus Imboden)
- 2004: Donna Leon – Fast Asleep
- 2004: Tatort – Todes-Bande (TV; Director: Thomas Bohn)
- 2005: Max and Moritz Reloaded (Director: Thomas Frydetzki)
- 2005: When Love Appears (TV; Director: Dagmar Damek)
- 2006: The Unclean Time (TV; Director: Thomas Freundner)
- 2007: Witness (TV; Director: Johannes Grieser)
- 2007: The Heart Is a Dark Forest (Director: Nicolette Krebitz)
- 2008: The Day I met my Dead Husband (Director: Matthias Luthardt)
- 2008: Long Shadows (Director: Connie Walther)
- 2009: For Miriam (Director: Lars-Gunnar Lotz)
- 2011: Ein starkes Team – Gnadenlos (TV; Director: Peter Fratzscher)
- 2012: Betrayal (Director: Kirill Serebrennikov)
- 2013: Stuttgart Homicide – Amnesie (TV-Serie)
- 2014: Tatort – Der Maulwurf (TV)
- 2014: Der Kriminalist – Checker Kreuzkölln (TV-Serie)
- 2015: Platonow (Director: Andreas Morell)
- 2016: Marie Brand and the Trace of Fear (TV-Serie)
- 2016: Dolores (Director: Michael Rösel)
- 2016: Landkrimi - Sommernachtsmord
- 2016: The Duelist – (Director: Aleksey Mizgirev)
