= Tamas and Juli =

- Fox Lorber DVD cover
- Directed by: Ildikó Enyedi
- Written by: Ildikó Enyedi
- Produced by: Caroline Benjo; Carole Scotta; Jolán Árvai
- Cinematography: Tamás Sas
- Edited by: Mária Rigó
- Release date: 1997
- Running time: 60 minutes
- Country: Hungary
- Language: Hungarian

Tamas and Juli (Hungarian: Tamás és Juli) is a 1997 Hungarian romantic film directed by Ildikó Enyedi for the 2000, Seen By... project.

== Plot ==
In a small town, Tamas, a coal miner, meets Juli, a kindergarten teacher, and begins dating her. Their first dates are always disrupted, but they end with a date on New Year's Eve, 1999.

== Production ==
The film was produced for the 2000, Seen By... project, initiated by the French company Haut et Court to produce films depicting the approaching turn of the millennium seen from the perspectives of 10 different countries.

== Reception ==
Deborah Young of Variety called Tamas and Juli "a slight but sensitively handled love story," and "a decent, warmhearted examination of the difficulties of young love." Ted Shen of the Chicago Reader writes that Enyedi "communicates romance elliptically, through the lovers' hesitations, doleful expressions, and broad smiles."
