= The Last U-Boat =

1993 German television film

- Screenplay by: Knut Boeser
- Directed by: Frank Beyer
- Starring: Ulrich Mühe; Ulrich Tukur; Kaoru Kobayashi; Goro Ohashi; Manfred Zapatka; Matthias Habich; Udo Samel; Sylvester Groth
- Countries of origin: Germany; Austria; United States; Japan
- Original languages: English; Japanese

Production
- Producers: Alfred Nathan (ZDF); Werner Swossil (ORF); Paul Coss (ABC); Kagari Tajima (NHK); Manfred Durniok
- Editor: Rita Hiller
- Running time: 100 minutes

Original release
- Release: 1993

The Last U-Boat (German: Das letzte U-Boot) is a 1993 German television film directed by Frank Beyer, starring Ulrich Mühe and Ulrich Tukur, and scored by Oskar Sala. The film is loosely based on the true story of the German submarine U-234’s first and only mission into enemy or contested territory, to Japan, in the closing days of World War II.

== Cast ==
- Ulrich Mühe as Kommandant Gerber
- Ulrich Tukur as Röhler
- Kaoru Kobayashi as Tatsumi
- Goro Ohashi as Kimura
- Manfred Zapatka as Beck
- Matthias Habich as Mellenberg
- Udo Samel as Dr. Falke
- Sylvester Groth as Maschke
- Johannes Herrschmann as Silowsky
- Tom Jahn as Koch Reidel
- Andrew Wilson as Grant
- Thore Seeberg as Leader of the Submarines
- Magne-Håvard Brekke (as Magne Brekke) as Norwegian train driver
- Kiyoshi Kodama as Japanese minister
- Isao Natsuyagi as Japanese Vice Admiral
- Takehiko Ono as Japanese State Secretary
- Lloyd Johnston as British Captain Toynbee
- Paul Herzberg as British officer Mayhew
- Johnathan Burn as Admiral Brighton
- Peter Scollin as Rear Admiral Dean
- Barry Bostwick as US Captain Hawkins

== Home release ==
In 2010 the film was distributed in Germany on DVD by Pandastorm Pictures GmbH. In Spain it was marketed as Das Boot 2: The Last Mission in reference to the unrelated 1981 West German submarine film Das Boot directed by Wolfgang Petersen.
