= Marco – Über Meere und Berge =

- Starring: Umberto Caglini; Giuliano Gemma; Constanze Engelbrecht
- Country of origin: Italy, Germany

Original release
- Network: Canale 5 ZDF

Marco – Über Meere und Berge (Italian: Dagli Appennini alle Ande) is a 1990 German-Italian television serial. It is loosely based on one of the stories from the novel Heart (Cuore) by Edmondo De Amicis, i.e. the monthly tale (racconto mensile) From the Apennines to the Andes (Dagli Appennini alle Ande).

== See also ==
- List of German television series
