= Marion Kracht =

German actress (born 1962)

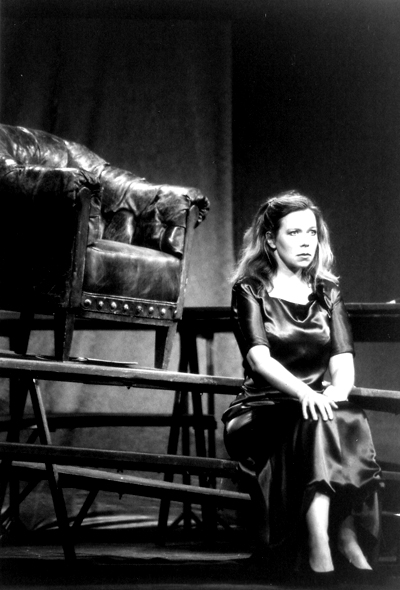
- Born: Marion Kracht; 5 December 1962 (age 63); Munich, West Germany

Marion Kracht (born 5 December 1962 in Munich, West Germany) is a German actress. Currently she resides in Berlin.

== Selected filmography ==
- Who Laughs Last, Laughs Best (1971)
- Passion Flower Hotel (1978), as Jane
- After Midnight (1981), as Gerti
- Ein Heim für Tiere (1985–1989, TV series), as Lisa Bayer
- Diese Drombuschs (1985–1994, TV series), as Tina Reibold
- Böses Blut (1993, TV film), as Verena Westfal
- Der Havelkaiser (1994–2000, TV series), as Jette Kaiser
- Hallo Robbie! (2001–2006, TV series), as Frauke Marten
- I'm the Father (2002), as Christa
- Familie Sonnenfeld (2005–2009, TV series), as Tina Sonnenfeld
- Liebe, Babys und ein großes Herz (2006–2012, TV series), as Antonia Maibach
- My Führer – The Really Truest Truth about Adolf Hitler (2007), as Make-Up Artist Rosemarie Riefenstahl
- Babylon Berlin (2017, TV series), as Mother Jänicke
