= Marek Harloff =

German actor (born 1971)

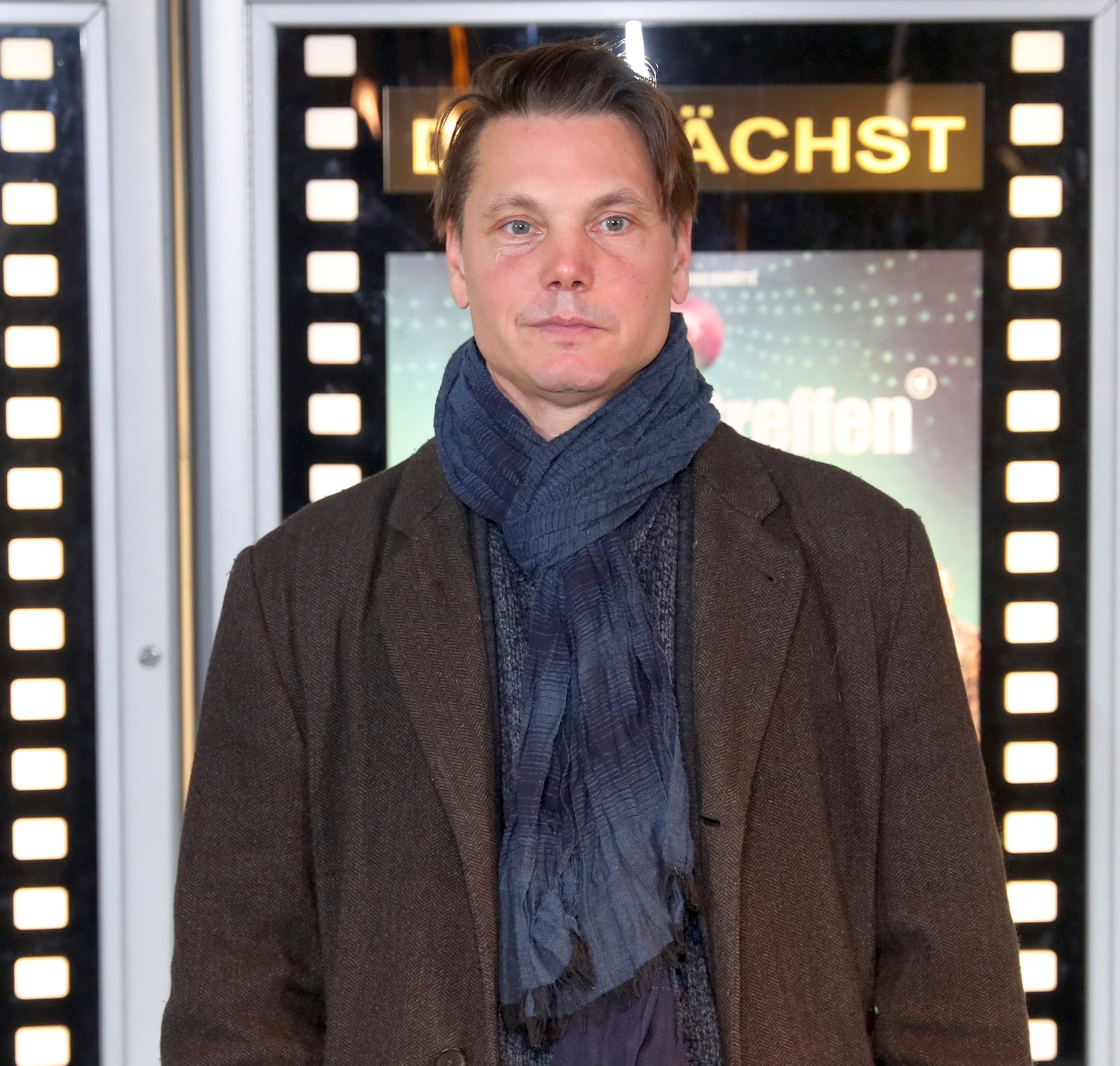
- Born: 22 April 1971 (age 55); Hamburg, West Germany
- Occupation: Actor
- Years active: 1984-present

Marek Harloff (born 22 April 1971) is a German actor. He appeared in more than seventy films since 1984.

== Selected filmography ==
| Year | Title | Role | Notes |
|---|---|---|---|
| 1991 | Die Eisprinzessin | Ollo | TV miniseries |
| 1995 | Deathmaker | Kress | |
| 1996 | The Shadow Man | Louis Herzog | TV miniseries |
| 1996 | Kinder ohne Gnade | Marcel | TV film |
| 1996 | Crash Kids | Nik | TV film |
| 1997 | The Scorpion | Robin Berthold | TV film |
| 1998 | Candy | Markus | |
| 1999 | Dragonland | Hannes | TV film |
| 1999 | The Cry of the Butterfly | Pablo | TV film |
| 2000 | Stunde des Wolfs | Florian Grosche | TV film |
| 2000 | Bloody Weekend | Dean | |
| 2000 | Forget America | David Ludoff | |
| 2001 | Babykram ist Männersache | Belinda | TV film |
| 2001 | The Wound | Hendrik | TV film |
| 2004 | PiperMint | Theo | |
| 2004 | Blackout Journey | Mio | |
| 2013 | Generation War | Karow | TV series |
