= Auto Fritze =

- Starring: Michael Degen
- Country of origin: Germany

Auto Fritze is a German family television series, broadcast between 1993 and 1994 set in a garage and revolving around the Fritze brothers. One of them is an idealist who commits himself to restoring vintage cars while the other is a materialist specialised in selling only the most expensive and newest cars.

== See also ==
- List of German television series
