= Crash Kids =

- Written by: Petra Haffter
- Directed by: Petra Haffter
- Starring: Isabell Gerschke; Barbara Rudnik
- Music by: Jens Fischer

Production
- Producers: Doris J. Heinze; Daniel Zuta
- Cinematography: Michael Heiter
- Editors: Barbara Von; Weitershausen

Original release
- Release: 1996

Crash Kids is a 1996 German television film drama directed by Petra Haffter and starring Isabell Gerschke and Marek Harloff. The film was first broadcast on television on December 13, 1996, on Arte.

== Plot ==
14-year-old Laura is struggling to come to terms with puberty. When she meets a teenage car-breaker and crash driver, she feels drawn to him, craving adventure and romance. But when the playful thrill turns serious, her life begins to fall apart. Together there, their odyssey takes them to the south of France. A mixture of crime film and road movie, it sheds light on a part of young (outsider) culture.

== Production notes ==
Crash Kids was filmed on locations in Côte d'Azur, France.

ARTE was the Production company.

== Review ==
The film service wrote: “Mixture of crime film and road movie that wants to shed light on part of young (outsider) culture.”
