= Forget America =

2000 film by Vanessa Jopp

- Directed by: Vanessa Jopp
- Starring: Marek Harloff; Roman Knižka; Franziska Petri
- Cinematography: Judith Kaufmann
- Release date: 28 June 2000 (Filmfest München)
- Running time: 90 min
- Country: Germany
- Language: German

Forget America (German: Vergiss Amerika) is a 2000 German drama film directed by Vanessa Jopp.

== Cast ==
- Marek Harloff - David Ludoff
- Roman Knižka - Benno
- Franziska Petri - Anna Lindner
