= Manfred Zapatka =

German actor (born 1942)

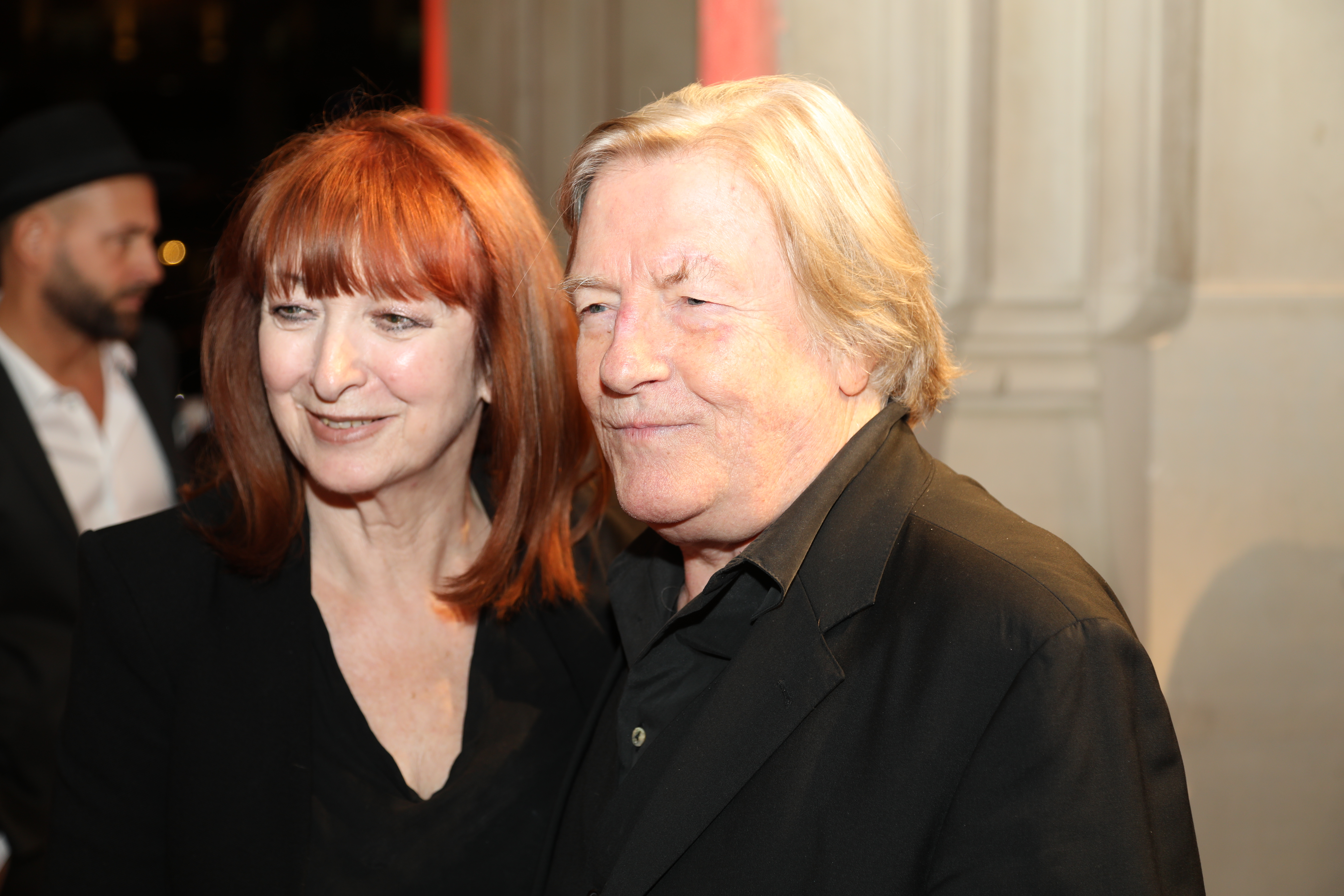
- Manfred Zapatka at the Hessian Film and Cinema Prize 2017
- Born: 2 October 1942 (age 82); Bremen, Germany
- Awards: Grimme Preis (Wettbewerbskategorie Spezial) in 2002 for the Himmler-Project

Manfred Zapatka (born 2 October 1942 in Bremen, Germany) is a German actor.

== Early life ==
Zapatka completed his abitur at Clemens-August-Gymnasium in Cloppenburg in 1962.

== Selected filmography ==
- 1964: Das Lamm
- 1978: Germany in Autumn (Deutschland im Herbst)
- 1980: Derrick - Season 7, Episode 7: "Der Tod sucht Abonnenten" (TV)
- 1982: War and Peace
- 1983: Utopia (at the 33rd Berlin International Film Festival)
- 1988: Derrick - Season 15, Episode 12: "Eine Art Mord" (TV)
- 1989: Fabrik der Offiziere (The Officer Factory, TV miniseries)
- 1989: Rivalen der Rennbahn (TV series, 11 episodes)
- 1990: Der Absturz a.k.a. Der Rausschmeißer (TV film)
- 1991: Ex & Hopp (TV film)
- 1991: Success
- 1993: The Last U-Boat (TV film)
- 1993: The Great Bellheim (TV miniseries)
- 1993: Ebbie's Bluff
- 1995: The Public Prosecutor (TV film)
- 1997: Death Game (TV film)
- 1998: Frankfurt Millennium (TV film)
- 2000: Erkan & Stefan (Erkan & Stefan the Bunnyguards)
- 2000: Manila
- 2001: Das Himmler-Projekt
- 2002: Elephant Heart
- 2003: Tatort: Mutterliebe (TV)
- 2003: Der Puppengräber (TV film)
- 2004: Die Nacht singt ihre Lieder (Nightsongs, at the 54th Berlin International Film Festival)
- 2004: Rosa Roth: Freundeskreis (TV)
- 2004: Mord am Meer (TV film)
- 2005: Spiele der Macht – 11011 Berlin (TV film)
- 2005: Falscher Bekenner (I Am Guilty)
- 2006: Der freie Wille (The Free Will)
- 2006: Offset
- 2006: Eden
- 2006: Hamburger Lektionen
- 2007-2010: KDD – Kriminaldauerdienst (TV series, 27 episodes)
- 2007: Autopilots
- 2008: Die Weisheit der Wolken (TV film)
- 2008: The Lie (TV film)
- 2010: Die Zeit der Kraniche (TV film)
- 2011: In the Prime of Life (TV film)
- 2011: Schreie der Vergessenen (TV film)
- 2014: Besondere Schwere der Schuld (TV film)
- 2019: All My Loving
- 2019: The Collini Case (Der Fall Collini)
