= Hallo Robbie! =

- Starring: Marion Kracht; Karsten Speck
- Country of origin: Germany

Hallo Robbie! is a German television series, which was broadcast on ZDF between 2001 and 2009. It is named after the character of Robbie, played by Gordy the seal. Gordy was found dead in Tetzitzer Lake in Rügen in May 2005.

== See also ==
- List of German television series
