= Witta Pohl =

German actress

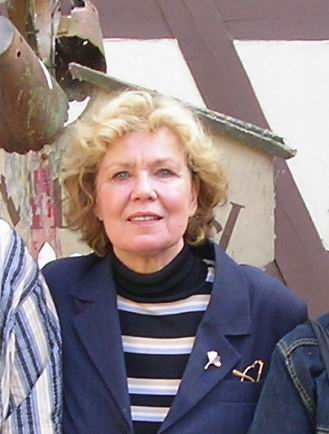
- Born: Witta Breipohl; 1 November 1937; Königsberg, East Prussia
- Died: 4 April 2011 (aged 73); Hamburg, Germany
- Occupation: Actress
- Years active: 1966–2009
- Spouses: Karl Maldeck (divorced) Charles Brauer (m. 1966; div. 1976) Ekkehart Franz (m. 1989)
- Children: 2

Witta Pohl (née Breipohl; 1 November 1937 – 4 April 2011) was a German actress.

== Life ==
Born in the East Prussian city of Königsberg, she was one of six children to Wilhelm Breipohl, a gynaecologist, and his wife Marie-Luise, née Klönne.

During World War II, her family moved to Bielefeld, where Pohl grew up. After working as a beautician, she attended drama school in Berlin to become a stage actress.

Her most popular role however was that of "Vera Drombusch" in the highly successful television drama series Diese Drombuschs from 1983 to 1994.

She died from leukemia in Hamburg in 2011 aged 73.

== Selected filmography ==
- Supermarket (1974)
- Desperado City (1981)
- Kudenow (1981, TV film)
- Diese Drombuschs (TV series, 1983–1994)
