= Diese Drombuschs =

- Genre: family drama
- Created by: Robert Stromberger
- Starring: Witta Pohl; Hans Peter Korff; Grete Wurm; Günter Strack; Mick Werup; Sabine Kaack; Eike Hagen Schweikhardt; Marion Kracht; Anja Jaenicke; Michael Degen; Constanze Engelbrecht; Susanne Schäfer
- Country of origin: West Germany (1983-1990); Germany (1990-1994)
- Original language: German
- No. of seasons: 6
- No. of episodes: 39

Original release
- Network: ZDF
- Release: 25 December 1983 – 16 January 1994

Diese Drombuschs is a German television series that originally aired on ZDF for six seasons from 1983 to 1994. The show revolves around a typical (West) German middle-class family living in the city of Darmstadt.

== Cast ==
- Witta Pohl as Vera Drombusch
- Hans-Peter Korff as Siegfried Drombusch (season 1–3)
- Grete Wurm as Margarete Drombusch
- Mick Werup as Christian "Chris" Drombusch (season 1–5)
- Sabine Kaack as Marion Drombusch #1 (season 1–5)
- Susanne Schäfer as Marion Drombusch #2 (season 6)
- Eike Hagen Schweikhardt as Thomas "Thomi" Drombusch
- Günter Strack as Ludwig Burlitz (season 2–6)
- Marion Kracht as Bettina "Tina" Drombusch, née Reibold (season 2–6)
- Michael Degen as Dr. Martin Sanders (season 3–4)
- Constanze Engelbrecht as Brigitte Sanders (season 3–4)
- Anja Jaenicke as Yvonne Boxheimer (season 4–6)

== See also ==
- List of German television series
