= Theaterpathologisches Institut =

The Theaterpathologisches Institut (English: Institute of Pathological Theater) is a theatrical project located in Hamburg, Germany founded by Roland Reber in 1981.
