= Alain Berliner =

Belgian film director

- Born: 21 February 1963 (age 63); Brussels, Belgium
- Occupation: Film director
- Known for: Ma vie en rose

Alain Berliner (born 21 February 1963) is a Belgian film director best known for the 1997 film Ma vie en rose, which won the Golden Globe Award for Best Foreign Language Film at the 55th Golden Globe Awards in 1998.

Born in Brussels, he also directed the satirical film Le Mur and the pictures Passion of Mind, La Maison du canal, J'aurais voulu être un danseur and The Skin of Sorrow.
