= Jürgen Hentsch =

German actor (1936–2011)

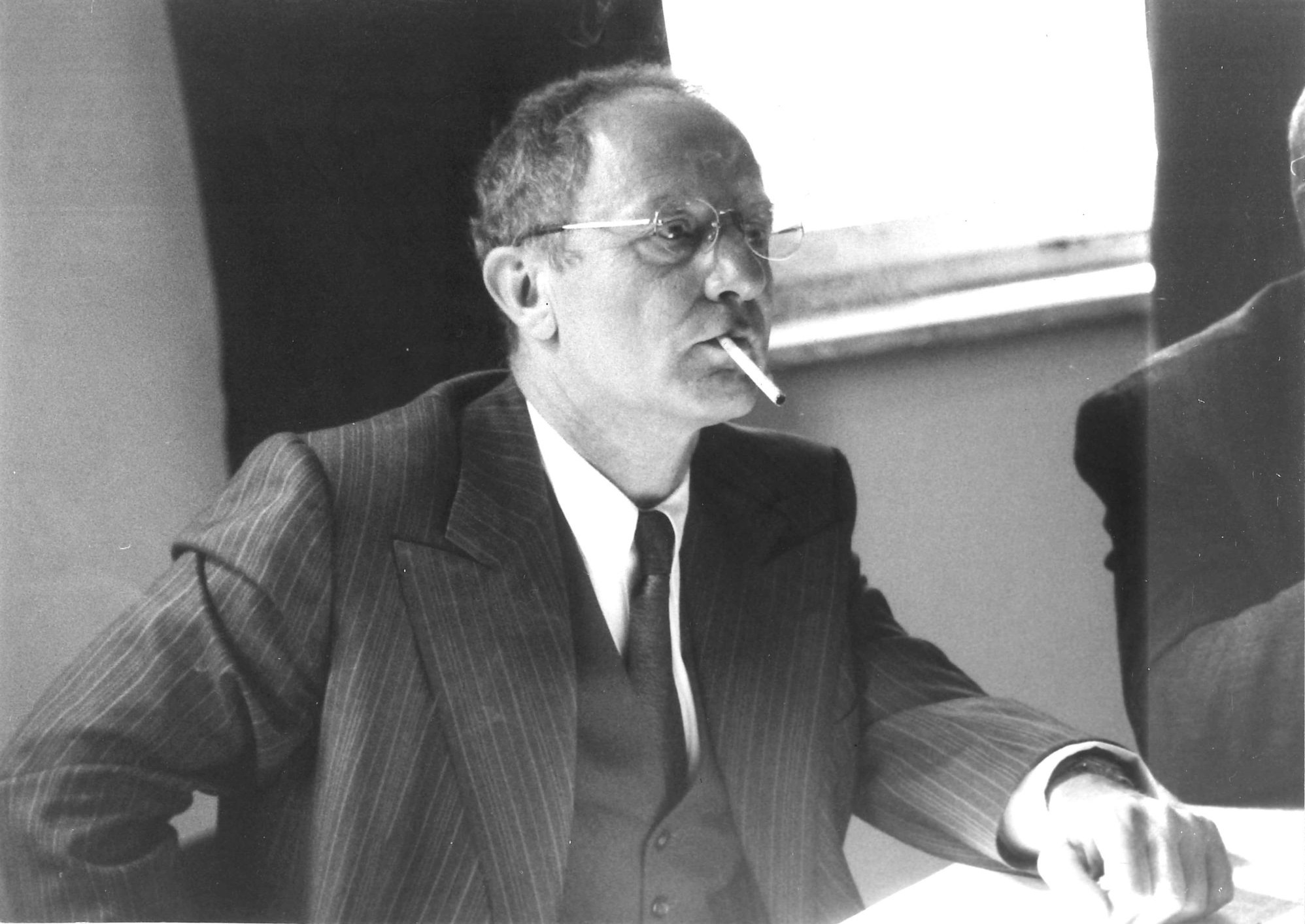
Jürgen Hentsch

Jürgen Hentsch (March 17, 1936 in Görlitz – December 21, 2011 in Berlin) was a German actor. He was known for several movies and TV shows such as The Deathmaker (1995), In the Shadow of Power (2003) and Der Mann mit der Maske (1994). He was married to Wassilka Hentsch.

== Selected filmography ==
- Ende der Unschuld (1991, TV film)
- Der Mann mit der Maske (1994, TV film)
- Deathmaker (1995)
- Hannah (1997)
- Bloody Weekend (2000)
- Die Manns – Ein Jahrhundertroman (2001, TV miniseries)
- In the Shadow of Power (2003, TV film)
- The Amber Amulet (2004, TV film)
- Curse This House (2004, TV film)
- March of Millions (2007, TV film)
