= Frankfurt Millennium =

- Directed by: Romuald Karmakar
- Written by: Michael Farin; Romuald Karmakar
- Based on: Für eine Mark und Acht by Jörg Fauser
- Produced by: Caroline Benjo; Carole Scotta; Gebhard Henke; Frank Henschke; Pierre Chevalier
- Starring: Michael Degen; Manfred Zapatka; Jochen Nickel
- Cinematography: Fred Schuler
- Distributed by: Haut et Court (France)
- Release date: 1998
- Running time: 58 minutes
- Country: Germany; France
- Language: German

Frankfurt Millennium (German: Das Frankfurter Kreuz) is a 1998 drama film directed by Romuald Karmakar and starring Michael Degen, Manfred Zapatka and Jochen Nickel. Conceived as part of the 2000, Seen By... project, the film is a German and French co-production.

== Plot ==
On New Year's Eve in 1999, a group of regulars meet at the Frankfurt Junction, a bar in Frankfurt. They engage in a conversation about why they are unhappy with their lives.

== Cast ==
- Michael Degen as Walter
- Manfred Zapatka as Harry
- Jochen Nickel as Mannie

== Production ==
The French company Haut et Court's producers Caroline Benjo and Carole Scotta initiated 2000, Seen By..., to produce films depicting the approaching turn of the millennium seen from the perspectives of 10 different countries. Karmakar adapted the radio play Für eine Mark und Acht by Jörg Fauser for the project.

== Reception ==
TV Spielfilm gave the film a positive review, citing its sarcasm and calling it dismal, in a nice way. Chicago Reader critic Ted Shen credited Karmakar with "efficiently pacing [characters'] monologues and dialogues while disclosing fine shades of surliness".
