= Julia Thurnau =

French-German fine artist and actress

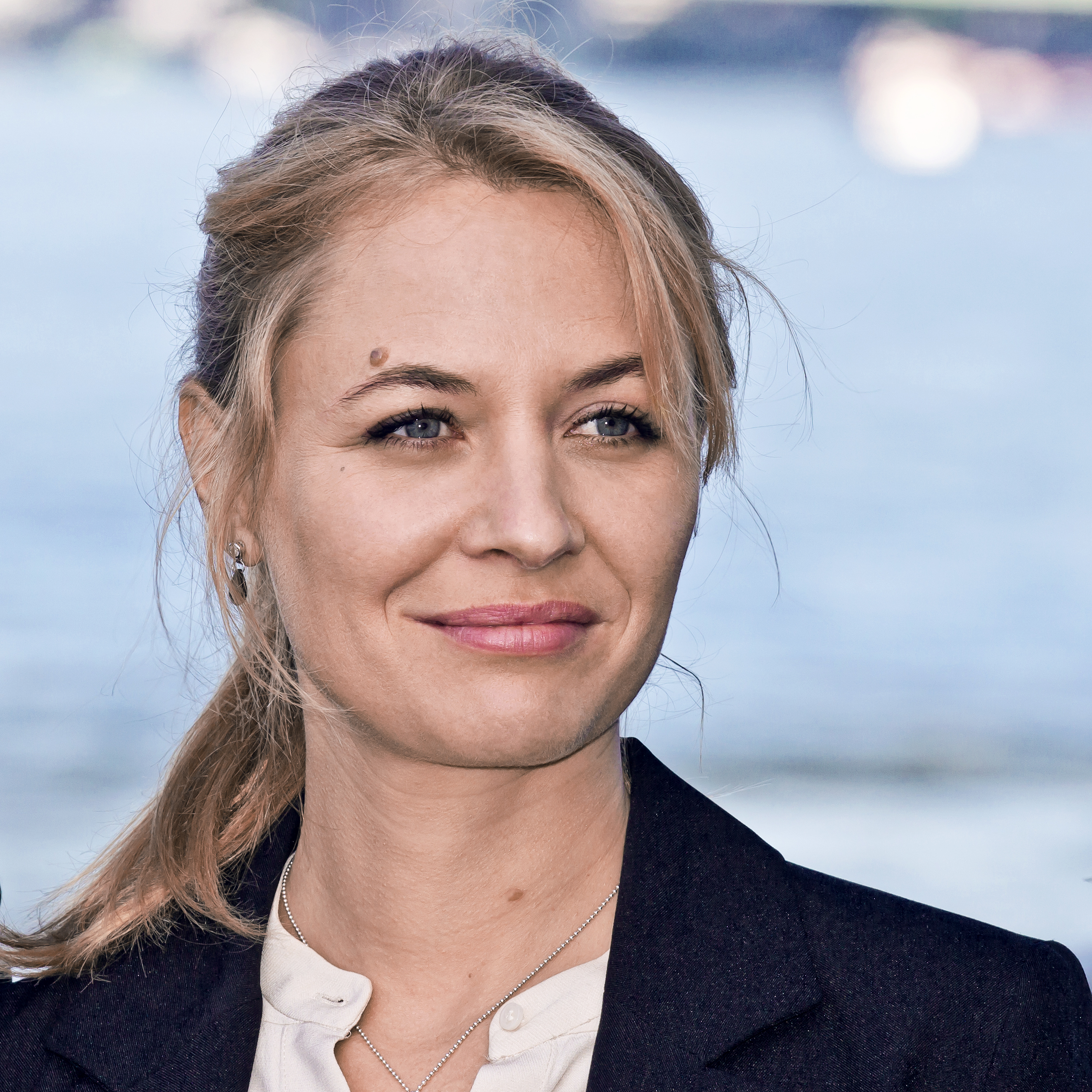
- Julia Thurnau 2014
- Born: 21 May 1974 (age 51); Munich, West Germany
- Other names: ClaudeHilde, Clothilde
- Website: juliathurnau.com

Julia Thurnau (born 21 May 1974) is a French-German fine artist and actress. She is working in the field of fine arts as a part of the collective ClaudeHilde as such she developed the social Sculpture "artist at work" together with Margarita Breitkreiz for the Volksbuehne am Rosa-Luxemburg Platz in Berlin in 2023.

Raised in a multi-cultural family Thurnau, Julia Thurnau speaks English and Spanish additionally to her mother tongues French and German. She had her debut as a director with the short film Ondinas in (2003). She studied acting in Munich at the Schauspielstudio München and later at the Ernst Busch acting school Berlin.

She first appeared in the film After Five in the Forest Primeval with Franka Potente in 1995. Since that she had major roles in more than 20 French and German cinema movies and TV-films, such as Der Weibsteufel (2000) by Jo Baier and D'Artagnan et les trois mousquetaires (2005) by Pierre Aknine.

== Cinema films (selection) ==
- 1995: After Five in the Forest Primeval
- 1997: Das merkwürdige Verhalten geschlechtsreifer Großstädter zur Paarungszeit
- 1998: Tag ohne Gestern
- 1999: Schmetterlinge der Nacht
- 2000: Bitte schön, danke schön
- 2001: Erkan & Stefan gegen die Mächte der Finsternis
- 2001: Leo & Claire
- 2001: Brief des Kosmonauten
- 2002: Ein seltsames Paar
- 2002: Pieces of my Heart
- 2003: Ondinas
- 2004: Trois Mousquetaires
- 2005: Zwischenzeit
- 2006: Lumen
- 2015: 3 Türken und ein Baby
- 2016: Papa Bear
- 2018: Fame

== TV (selection) ==
- 1996: So ist das Leben! Die Wagenfelds
- 1997: SOKO 5113 – Dumm gelaufen
- 1997: First Love – Das verflixte 1. Mal
- 1998: Der Clown
- 1999: Der Weibsteufel
- 1999: Geregelte Verhältnisse
- 1999: Urlaub in Marokko
- 2000: Nikola
- 2000: Polizeiruf 110
- 2000: Wie angelt man sich einen Müllmann
- 2001/2002: Liebe, Lügen, Leidenschaften
- 2001: Du oder keine
- 2001: Nicht ohne meinen Anwalt
- 2002: Auch Erben will gelernt sein
- 2002: Der Bulle von Tölz
- 2002: Er oder keiner
- 2003: Was nicht passt, wird passend gemacht
- 2004: SOKO Kitzbühel
- 2004: Tatort
- 2005: The Man Women Want
- 2005: SOKO Wien (TV series, 1 episode)
- 2005: Die Rosenheim-Cops: Der Tote am See
- 2005: Wer entführt meine Frau?
- 2006: Agathe kann's nicht lassen
- 2006: Alarm für Cobra 11
- 2009: In the Last Moment (Short film trilogy, 1 episode), as Hélène
- 2010-2013: Nicolas Le Floch (TV series, 3 episodes), as Madame de Crequy
- 2013: A World Beyond (TV movie), as Friedel Braun
- 2014: Momentversagen (TV movie), as Caroline von Studt
- 2015: 3 Türken und ein Baby, as Helgard
- 2014-2016: Letzte Spur Berlin (TV series, 11 episodes), as Caro Haffner
- 2016: Papa Bear (Short film)
- 2016: Der Kriminalist (TV series episode), as Katharina Möbius
- 2016: Spuren der Rache (TV movie), as Bille Ritter
- 2017: Zarah – Wilde Jahre (TV series, 2 episodes), as Hedda Hartwig
- 2019: Terra X: Ein Tag in Köln 1629 (TV documentary), as Anna Stein
- 2021: In aller Freundschaft – Die jungen Ärzte: Adventskind (TV movie), as Christine Schremmer

== Theater (selection) ==
- 2002: Birdsong, Regie: Beatrice Murmann
- 2004: Liebst du mich Lump, Regie: Beatrice Murmann
- 2005: Fräulein Julie, Regie: Marcel Krohn
- 2007: The vagina monologues, director: Laurie Norquist
- 2009: Roses Geheimnis, Regie: Frank Mattus
- 2022: ClaudeHildes Pop up Galerie is hosting Sprachmaschine, director: Daniel Wittkopp, Margarita Breitkreiz.
- 2023: Artist at Work, social sculpture, ClaudeHilde
