= Kida Khodr Ramadan =

German-Lebanese actor (born 1976)

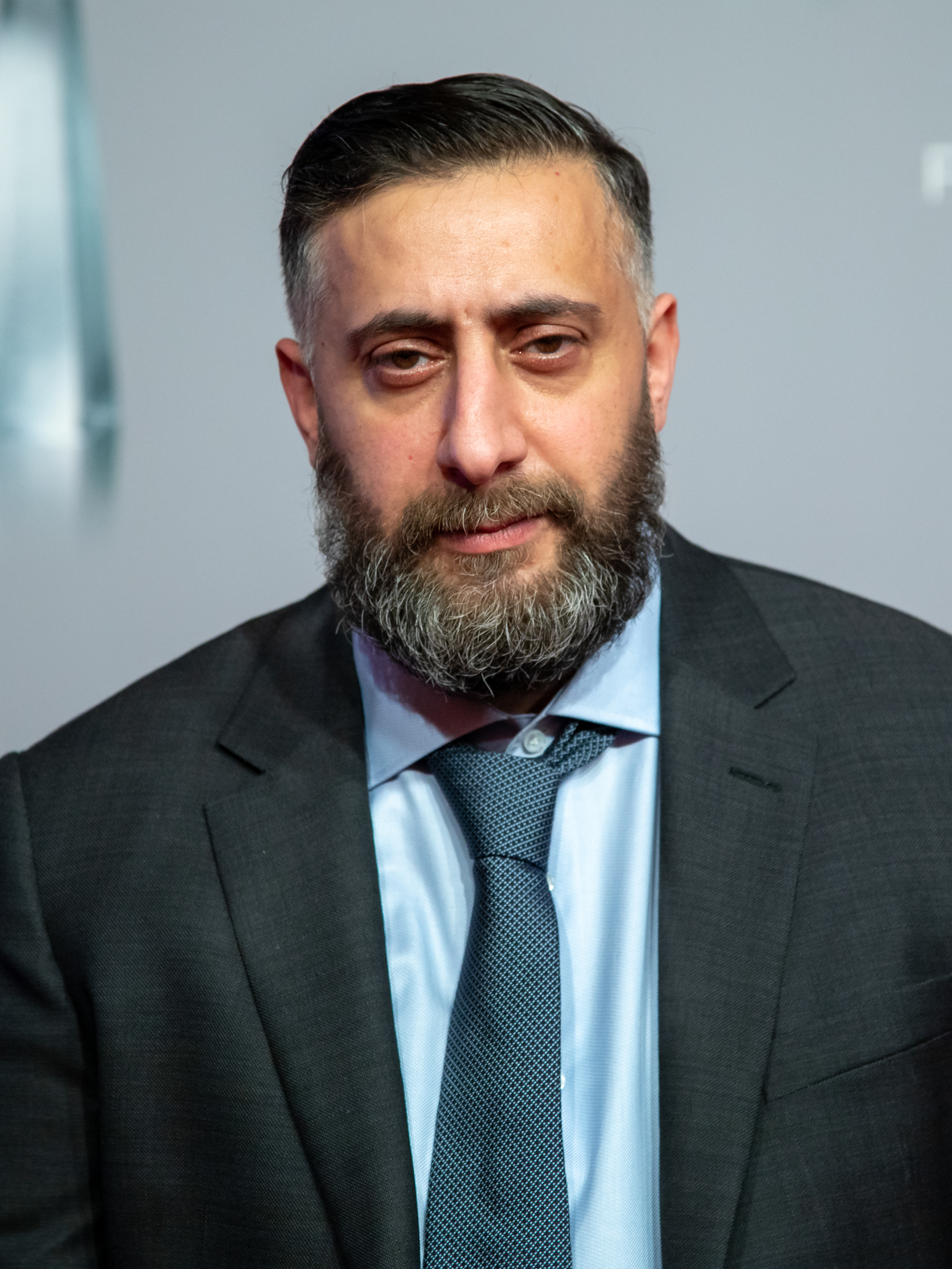
- Ramadan in 2019
- Born: Kida Khodr Ramadan; 8 October 1976 (age 50); Beirut, Lebanon
- Occupations: Actor; director; screenwriter

Kida Khodr Ramadan (born 8 October 1976) is a German actor, director and screenwriter. He has won several awards for his portrayal of Ali "Toni" Hamady in the German drama series 4 Blocks.

== Early life ==
Kida Khodr Ramadan was born in 1976 in Beirut, Lebanon, the fifth child of a Lebanese father and a Turkish mother, both of Mhallami origin. His father, Mohamad Ramadan, was a successful businessman representing Persil Lebanon. As the Lebanese Civil War worsened—particularly in East Beirut, where they lived—relatives were killed and Mohamad was injured by shrapnel, prompting the family to flee. They chose Germany after securing the first available visa and initially lived in an asylum hostel in West Berlin’s Kreuzberg district. Mohamad later worked at Burger King before opening his own steakhouse restaurants.

Ramadan went to the Hector-Peterson-Gesamtschule school in Kreuzberg. He said high school did not interest him and he left without qualification, and entered the local hip-hop and breakdance scene. He partook in street performances with Turkish and Arabic-speaking youths at Kurfürstendamm and elsewhere.

== Career ==
The Turkish-German director Neco Çelik gave Ramadan his first break in 2003 after meeting him at a summer camp, giving him a role in Alltag (Everyday), a story about two youngsters who rob a bookies in Kreuzberg.

His first project as solo director was "In Berlin wächst kein Orangenbaum" (In Berlin, No Orange Tree Grows), also as writer with Juri Sternburg, and producer, premiered at Filmfest München Pop-up 2020.

== Personal life ==
Ramadan married Meryem in Turkey in 1996, and the couple have six children. He is the uncle of Omar Bugiel, a Lebanese international footballer.

A competitive boules player, he resides in Berlin and is fluent in German, Arabic, Turkish, and Kurdish. Ramadan lives in Berlin.
