= Michael Degen =

German-Israeli actor (1928–2022)

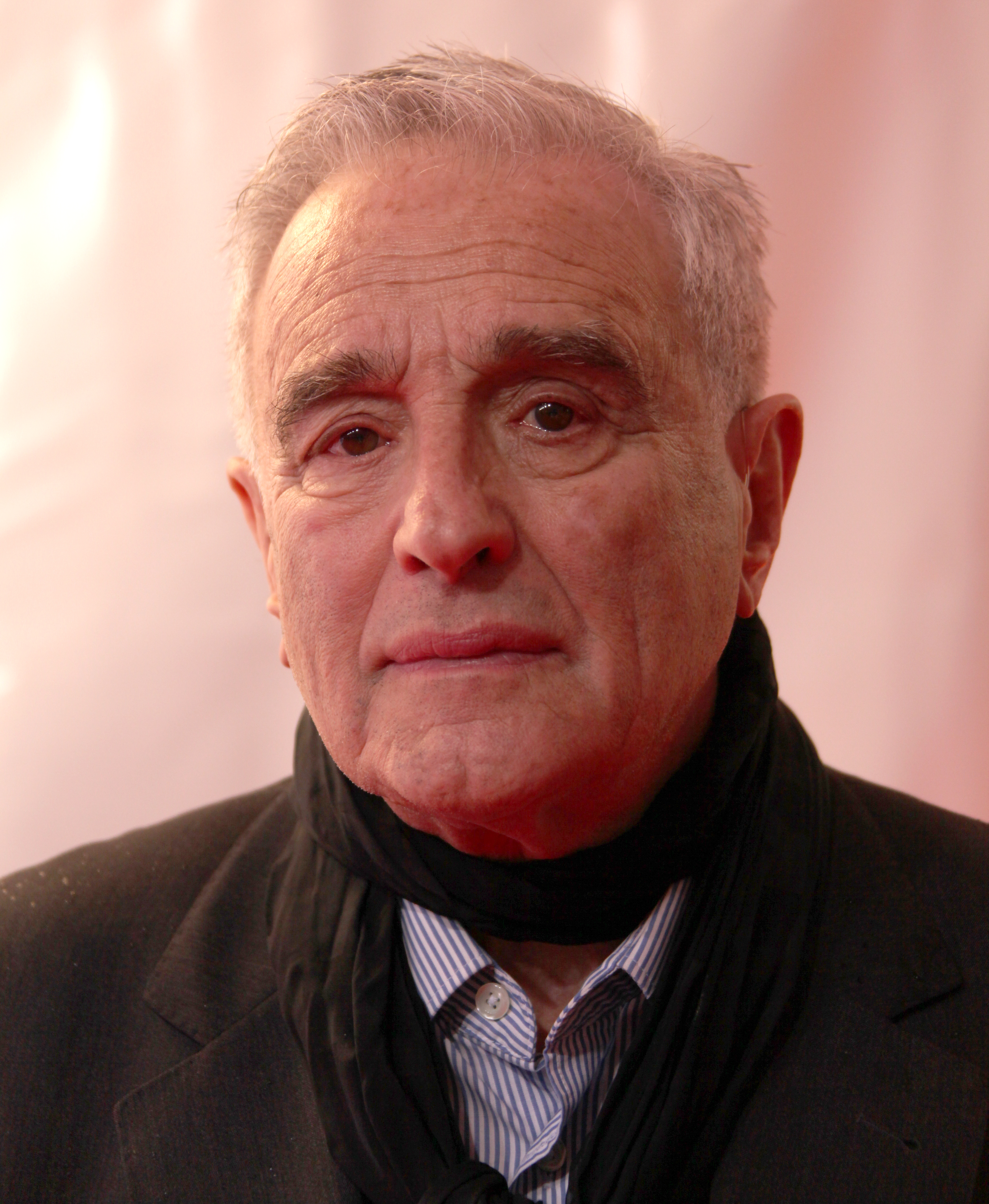
- Degen in 2012
- Born: 31 January 1928; Chemnitz, Saxony, Germany
- Died: 9 April 2022 (aged 94); Hamburg, Germany
- Citizenship: Germany; Israel
- Occupations: Actor; Theatre director; Writer
- Years active: 1963–2022

Michael Degen (31 January 1928 – 9 April 2022) was a German-Israeli actor appearing in film and theatre, as well as a theatre director and writer.

== Early life ==
Born in Chemnitz as the younger son of Jewish parents, Degen survived the Holocaust in Berlin, while his older brother was sent to Palestine via Denmark and Sweden. His father, Jacob Degen, was a language professor and businessman of Russian Jewish descent. On 13 September 1939, Jacob Degen was arrested by the Secret State Police and taken to the Sachsenhausen concentration camp. Subjected to severe abuse over the weeks that followed, he was released on 2 February 1940 but never recovered from his injuries, dying shortly afterward. To survive, Michael and his mother, Anna, hid in a Berlin allotment until the end of the war.

In 1946, Degen appeared on stage for the first time and received his education through a scholarship at the acting school of the Deutsches Theater in East Berlin. In 1949, he emigrated to Israel for two years. Degen served as a soldier in Israel and acted in theatres in Tel Aviv.

== Career ==
In 1954, Degen joined Bertolt Brecht's Berliner Ensemble at the Theater am Schiffbauerdamm in East Berlin. In 1955–1956, he worked with the Schauspiel Köln. From 1956 to 1963 he was at the Mannheim National Theatre, followed by the Schauspiel Frankfurt in 1963–1964. From 1967 to 1973, he worked at the Staatliche Schauspielbühnen Berlin. During his career, he played Shakespeare's Hamlet 300 times. A reviewer of The Times wrote of Degen's acting in Harry Buckwitz's 1965 Hamlet production at Schauspiel Frankfurt, "Nervously impulsive and sometimes violently emotional". Degen performed in Munich, Salzburg and Hamburg and worked with directors including Ingmar Bergman, George Tabori Peter Zadek and Claude Chabrol. He was Molière's Dom Juan in Ingmar Bergman's production at the Salzburg Festival and Adam in Kleist's The Broken Jug. He was also a director: his premiere was in Goethe's Urfaust in 1972. He was a director for four years at the Bayerisches Staatsschauspiel, Munich. Degen began appearing in films in 1963. In Franz Peter Wirth's Buddenbrooks television adaptation (1979), he played the role of Bendix Grünlich. He played Adolf Hitler in Michael Kehlmann's 1988 film Geheime Reichssache as well as Dr. Martin Sanders in Diese Drombuschs. His last role was the vain Vice-Questore Patta in the television series Donna Leon.

Degen wrote in his 1999 debut Nicht alle waren Mörder. Eine Kindheit in Berlin. (Not All Were Murderers. A childhood in Berlin.) about his own experiences during the Nazi era.

== Personal life ==
Degen lived with his third wife in Hamburg. He had four children from previous marriages. He was an Israeli and German citizen.

He died on 9 April 2022 in Hamburg, at the age of 94. An obituary of the Frankfurter Allgemeine Zeitung called Degen "an actor of melancholic elegance".

== Legacy ==
In 2006, Jo Baier filmed Degen's memoirs with Aaron Altaras and Nadja Uhl for ARD (Not All Were Murderers).

== Awards ==
- 1969 Großer Hersfeld-Preis
- 1988 Kainz-Medaille
- 2003 Berliner Bär (B.Z.-Kulturpreis)

== Selected filmography ==
Film
Year	Title	Role	Notes
1974	Supermarket	Frank	
1976	21 Hours at Munich	Mohammed Khadif	TV film
1977	Beyond Good and Evil	Karl Andreas	
1979	Phantasten	Sollier	TV film
1982	Elective Affinities	Hauptmann Otto	TV film
1983	The Oppermanns	Dr. Gustav Oppermann	TV film
1987	The Colony	Karl Brunner	
1988	The Bomb	Paul Meyerdiercks	TV film
1988	Geheime Reichssache	Adolf Hitler	TV film
1990	Dr. M	Reimar von Geldern	
1990	The Master of the Day of Judgment	Waldemar Solgrub	TV film
1998	Eine ungehorsame Frau	Georg Winterborn	TV film
1998	Frankfurt Millennium	Walter	
2000	Manila	Walter	
2000	Rote Glut	Gustav Kohmers	TV film
2001	Leo & Claire	Leo Katzenberger	
2002	At Night in the Park	Krahn	
2003	Babiy Yar	Genadij Lerner	
2012	Lost in Siberia	Fengler	
2012	Hannah Arendt	Kurt Blumenfeld	

TV Series
Year	Title	Role	Notes
1979	The Buddenbrooks	Bendix Grünlich	3 episodes
1987–1990	Diese Drombuschs	Dr. Martin Sanders	15 episodes
1988	Game, Set and Match	Werner Volkmann	13 episodes
1993–1994	Auto Fritze	Otto Fritze	26 episodes
1994	Anna Maria – Eine Frau geht ihren Weg	Hannes Seeberger	First episode
1996	Tanz auf dem Vulkan	Karl Reichmann	TV miniseries
2000–2019	Donna Leon	Vice-Questore Patta	25 episodes
2004	The Wishing Tree	Fritz Hofmann	TV miniseries
2008	Die Patin – Kein Weg zurück	Jochen Bühler	TV miniseries

== Writings ==
- Degen, Michael (1999). Nicht alle waren Mörder : eine Kindheit in Berlin (in German). München: Econ. ISBN 978-3-430-12049-4. OCLC 43557684. and Degen, Michael (2010). Nicht alle waren Mörder : eine Kindheit in Berlin (in German). Berlin: List. ISBN 978-3-548-60910-2. OCLC 729967730.
- Degen, Michael (2004). Blondi (in German). München: List. ISBN 3-548-60409-9. OCLC 76502376.
- Degen, Michael (2005). Der Steuerhinterzieher (in German). Berlin: Ullstein. ISBN 3-550-08617-2. OCLC 63125762.
- Degen, Michael (2007). Mein heiliges Land : auf der Suche nach meinem verlorenen Bruder (in German). Berlin: Rowohlt Berlin. ISBN 978-3-87134-559-3. OCLC 124038151.
- Degen, Michael (2011). Familienbande (in German). Berlin: Rowohlt Berlin. ISBN 978-3-87134-633-0. OCLC 724798726.
- Degen, Michael (2015). Der traurige Prinz Roman einer wahren Begegnung (in German). Berlin: Rowohlt Berlin. ISBN 978-3-87134-768-9. OCLC 897128120.
