= Janette Rauch =

Swiss-German actress (born 1962)

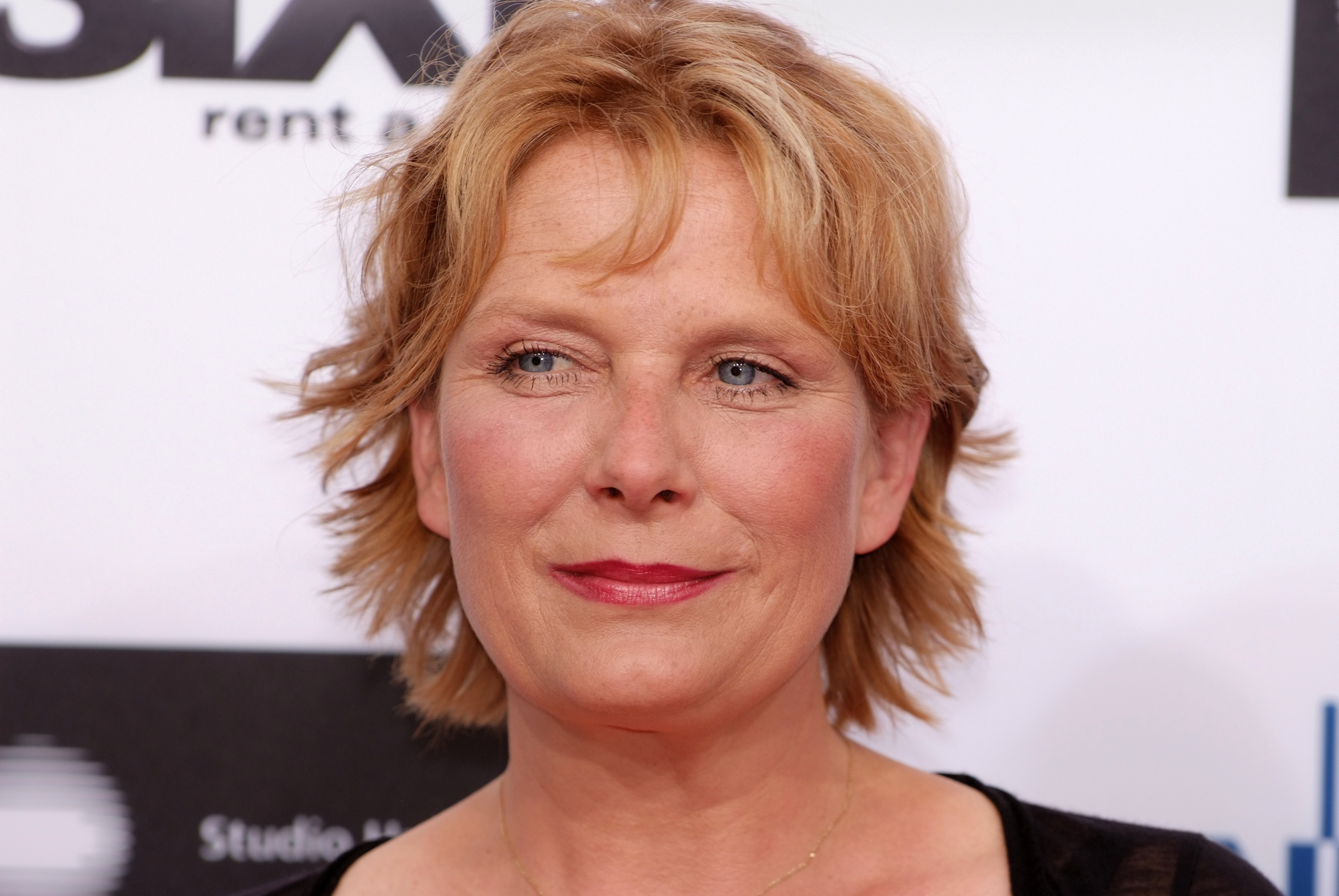
- Janette Rauch on the Red carpet at Studio Hamburg Nachwuchspreis 2012
- Born: 16 March 1962 (age 63); Winterthur, Switzerland
- Occupation: actor

Janette Rauch (born 16 March 1962) is a Swiss-German actress.

== Life ==
Janette Rauch grew up in Berlin as the daughter of a Swiss father. She was one of the original cast members of the musical Linie 1 at Berlin's Grips-Theater. She played the main role of "girl" until 1989. Since then, Rauch has been active in numerous German cinema and television films and series.

She became known to a wider audience through her role as Sister Christine in the 1990 movie Non-Stop Trouble in the Hospital and her role in the ZDF series Zwei alte Hasen. She was often seen alongside Hape Kerkeling in some of his films. Since 6 November 2006, she starred in the telenovela Rote Rosen; after the departure of Angela Roy in episode 214, she took over the lead role of gardener Alice Albers.

Since 2011, she has been a permanent fixture on the ZDF evening series Notruf Hafenkante.

Rauch claims to have survived the 2006 tsunami in Sri Lanka.

She lives in Bremen, Germany.

== Social engagement ==
Janette Rauch is a Children's Ambassador for Bremer Children's Day and was, until 2010, the patron of the children's hospice Löwenherz in Syke (near Bremen).

== Filmography ==
- 1987: Sierra Leone
- 1988: Schafe in Wales
- 1990: Non-Stop Trouble in the Hospital
- 1990–1993: Vera und Babs (26 episodes)
- 1995: Das Traumschiff (TV series) – "Tasmanien"
- 1996: Mensch, Pia! (TV series) (10 episodes)
- 1996: Willi und die Windzors
- 1997: Teneriffa – Tag der Rache (TV movie)
- 1997–1999: Gegen den Wind (TV series) (15 episodes)
- 1998: In aller Freundschaft
- 1998: Die Oma ist tot
- 1999: Herz über Bord
- 1999–2001: Aus gutem Haus
- 2000: Die Traumprinzen
- 2001: Alles wegen Paul (film)
- 2002: Rosamunde Pilcher: Mit den Augen der Liebe (TV movie)
- 2004: Das Traumschiff (TV series) – "Sri Lanka"
- 2004: Samba in Mettmann (film)
- 2005: In aller Freundschaft
- 2005: alphateam – Die Lebensretter im OP
- 2006: Balko – "Tod eines Fahrlehrers"
- 2006: Wilsberg: Tod auf Rezept
- 2006–2008: Rote Rosen
- 2008: Im Tal der wilden Rosen – "Zerrissene Herzen"
- 2009: Küstenwache – "Duell ohne Gnade"
- 2010 - 2018: Notruf Hafenkante
- 2012: Zwei für alle Fälle (TV series) – "Manche mögen Mord"
