= Becht =

Becht (/bɛkt/, German: [bɛçt]) is a German surname. Notable people with this surname include:

- Alexander Becht (born 1986), German actor
- Anthony Becht (born 1977), American football player
- Bart Becht (born 1956), Dutch businessman
- Friederike Becht (born 1986), German actress
- Hermann Becht (1939–2009), German operatic bass-baritone
- John Becht (1886–1960), American cyclist
- Olivier Becht (born 1976), French politician
