= Gisbert (TV series) =

- Created by: Hape Kerkeling
- Country of origin: Germany
- No. of seasons: 1
- No. of episodes: 6

Gisbert is a German television series that was created by Hape Kerkeling and was broadcast in 1999 by the WDR television company.

== Plot ==
Gisbert (Hape Kerkeling) is a substitute-worker, who is getting sub-jobs from the facilitator Frau Schlacke (Hella von Sinnen). In every episode it's a different job but cause of the naive kind of Gisbert he can't get any of the jobs. At the end he always gets fired and explains: "I just wanted to help". Another static role is Herr Faulhaber (Ralph Morgenstern), Frau Schlacke always called him her best employer.

Other actors are in every episode but always play different roles, like Isabel Varell, Maren Kroymann, Tana Schanzara and Gottfried Vollmer.

Every episode contains also guest stars, like Elke Sommer, Harald Schmidt, Zachi Noy or Katja Ebstein.

== See also ==
- List of German television series
