= Karina Thayenthal =

Austrian actress

Karina Thayenthal (born 2 April 1961 in St. Gallen, Switzerland) is an Austrian actor.

== Life ==
Karina Thayenthal, the daughter of a Swiss manager and an Austrian conductor, grew up in Mödling near Vienna. After Matura, she completed a three-year degree at the Hochschule für Musik und Darstellende Kunst Graz from 1980 to 1983.

She then performed on various stages, including the Schauspielhaus Graz (1982–83), at the Landestheater Linz (1983–86) and at the Wiener Volkstheater. For example, she appeared in Stigma by Felix Mitterer, in Zerbrochnen Krug by Kleist and in Susn by Herbert Achternbusch. In Germany, she first accepted an engagement at the Staatstheater Saarbrücken (1987–88). She was then engaged at the Schauspiel Frankfurt, where she played Marianne in Geschichten aus dem Wienerwald and Recha in Nathan der Weise.

In 1990, she made a guest appearance at the Luisenburg Festival in Wunsiedel as Vroni in Der Meineidbauer in a production that was also recorded by Bayerisches Fernsehen. She has also directed theater productions for several years, including in Stuttgart, Munich and Vienna.

Karina Thayenthal has also appeared in numerous television films, thrillers and series (including Der Landarzt, Tatort, Rosamunde Pilcher). For her role as Agnes in the television play Der Weg nach Lourdes, in which she played a young woman with multiple sclerosis, she was awarded the German Television Award as "Best Young Actress" in 1989.

At the end of 2012, she moved with her family to the rainforest in southwest Cameroon and, together with her husband, managed the drinking water project of a Swiss foundation for several years.

Karina Thayenthal, who also has Swiss citizenship, has lived in Switzerland since 2017. She is married and has three daughters.

== Filmography (selection) ==
- 1983: Derrick – Lohmann's inner peace (episode 105)
- 1986: Tatort: The Players
- 1987: Melzer oder die Tiefe der Jahre
- 1988: Roda Roda (Episode 10)
- 1988: Der Schwarze Obelisk
- 1992: Das Eine und das andere Glück
- 1992: The Mountain Doctor – Der Wolf
- 1992: Happy Holiday – Etikettenschwindel
- 1993: Wie Pech und Schwefel
- 1994: Ihre Exzellenz, die Botschafterin – Macht der Gefühle
- 1996: Feuerbach
- 1997: Es geschah am hellichten Tag
- 1997: Der Bulle von Tölz – Bei Zuschlag Mord
- 1998: Die Vier Spezialisten
- 1998: Rosamunde Pilcher – Magie der Liebe
- 1998: Alarm für Cobra 11 - Die Autobahnpolizei: Die letzte Chance
- 1998–2007: Der Landarzt
- 1999: Dr. Stefan Frank - Der Arzt, dem die Frauen vertrauen – Zwischen gestern und morgen
- 1999–2000: Lindenstraße
- 2000: Da wo die Berge sind
- 2003: Da wo die Liebe wohnt
- 2004: Da wo die Heimat ist
- 2007: In aller Freundschaft – Nichts bereuen
- 2008: Tatort – Borowski und die heile Welt
- 2008–2009: Rote Rosen, episode 399–572
- 2010: Notruf Hafenkante – Der verlorene Bräutigam
- 2012: SOKO 5113 – Kalte Spuren
- 2012: Die Rosenheim-Cops – Der Fall Ortmann
