= Where Are You Going, Habibi? =

2015 German film

- Theatrical film poster
- German: Wo willst du hin, Habibi?
- Directed by: Tor Iben
- Written by: Tor Iben
- Produced by: Susanna Duellmann
- Starring: Cem Alkan; Martin Walde
- Cinematography: Manuel Ruge
- Edited by: Markus Morkötter
- Music by: Bartosz Bludau; William Kudahl Sørensen
- Release dates: 30 August 2015 (Montréal); 10 March 2016 (Germany)
- Running time: 79 mins.
- Country: Germany
- Languages: English; German; Turkish

Where Are You Going, Habibi? (German: Wo willst du hin, Habibi?) is a 2015 German LGBTQ+ dramedy film, directed and written by Tor Iben in his debut. The film stars Cem Alkan and Martin Walde. It premiered at Montréal International Film Festival in 2015, before its limited release throughout Germany in 2016.

== Synopsis ==
Ibrahim falls in love with Alexander, a blond, blue-eyed German criminal and show wrestler who is straight — an impossible friendship that surpasses the both of them.

== Cast ==
- Cem Alkan as Ibrahim ("Ibo") Askin
- Martin Walde as Alexander ("Ali") Hirt
- Tuncay Gary as Ibo's Father
- Ilknur Boyraz as Ibo's Mother
- Neil Malik Abdullah as Uncle Mehmet
- Özay Fecht as Aunt Ayfer
- Alexander Becht as Lukas
- Anton Korppi-Tommola as Lars
- Rana Farahani as Pelin

== Reception ==
David Hall of Gay Celluloid remarked that the film is "lightweight but ever so much fun" and praised it for being "a spirited play on the bromance scenario". Zachary Wild of The Rectangular View lauded it for being "an interesting take on a buddy movie". Queer Guru called it an "utterly charming well-paced drama".

== Themes ==
The film has themes of German immigrant experience intersecting with religion, homophobia, and coming out, which are also reflected in earlier films including Lola and Billy the Kid (1999), The Edge of Heaven (2007), and Shahada (2010).
