= Da kommt Kalle =

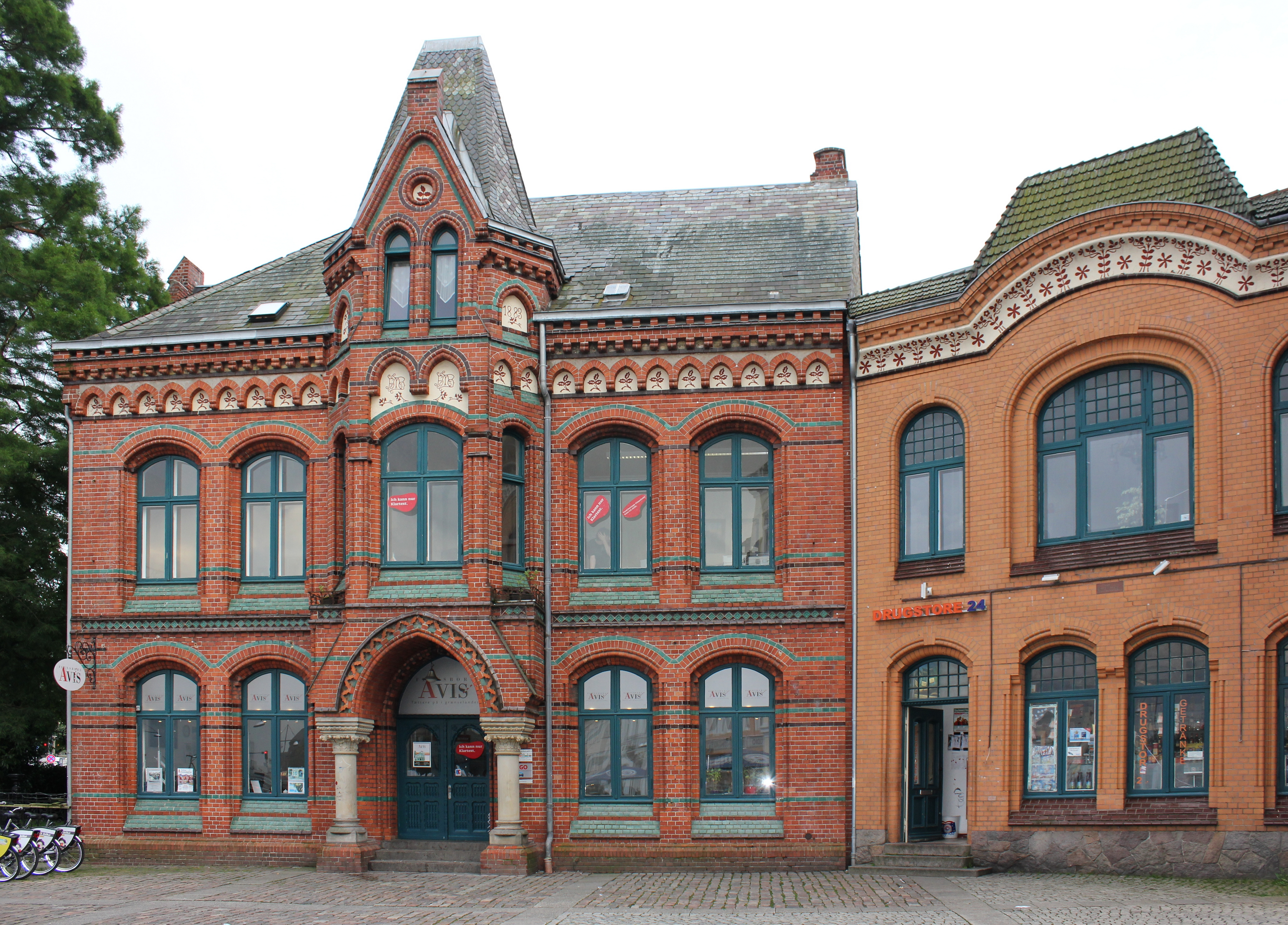
- Flensburg police HQ
- Starring: Katharina Schubert
- Country of origin: Germany
- No. of seasons: 5
- No. of episodes: 70

Production
- Running time: 45 minutes

Original release
- Network: ZDF
- Release: 14 October 2006

Da kommt Kalle (Here comes Kalle) was a German family entertainment television program depicting a Parson Russell Terrier who helps solve criminal cases and family dramas.

70 episodes were made in 5 series and broadcast on ZDF from 2006 to 2011 in a Saturday early evening slot. Each episode was 45 minutes long.

The series aired in United Kingdom for many years on Channel 4 titled as "Kalle The Hero Dog". Episodes were shown in the original German version, but with English subtitles.

== Plot ==
The terrier Kalle was adopted as a puppy by Pia Andresen (played by Katharina Schubert), chief of police in the north German seaside town of Flensburg. He helps solve police and family problems, often assisted by the Andresen children Hanno and Merle and sometimes by the woman next door and her dog Bruno.

== Locations ==
The program was mainly filmed on location in Flensburg and in Hamburg. Outdoor shots of the fictional police headquarters are of a picturesque building on Schiffbrückplatz in Flensburg in which the Danish language newspaper Flensborg Avis has its offices.

== Background ==
Da kommt Kalle is a Network Movie production on behalf of to the German ZDF channel. The show was filmed primarily in Flensburg and Hamburg. Only a few scenes have been filmed in areas outside of these two cities. Throughout the show, the way some buildings have been portrayed did not correspond to their actual function in real life. A small, picturesque building on the Schiffbrückplatz street was chosen to represent the police station, while the cities real central police headquarters are significantly bigger. So were the cities police dogs. In 2015 sixteen police dogs were at the disposal of Flensburg police department, mostly Belgian and German Shepherds.
