= Rote Rosen =

- Genre: Telenovela
- Opening theme: "This Is My Life" by Joana Zimmer
- Country of origin: Germany
- Original language: German
- No. of seasons: 25
- No. of episodes: 4500+

Production
- Running time: 50 minutes

Original release
- Network: Das Erste
- Release: 6 November 2006 – present

Rote Rosen (Red Roses) is a German telenovela produced by Studio Hamburg Serienwerft Lüneburg and broadcast by Das Erste since 6 November 2006. The show is a complex telenovela, which tells one love story every season about women in their forties.

== Cast ==
=== Protagonists couples ===
Actor	Character	Episodes	Duration	Guest Appearances
Season 1 • Episodes 1–214
Angela Roy	Petra Bergmann	1–214	2006–2007	2312–2315 (2016)
Joachim Raaf	Dr. Nick Bergmann	1–214	2006–2007	
Season 2 • Episodes 12–330
Janette Rauch	Alice Albers	1–330	2006–2008	381–385 (2008)
Jan Hartmann	Marc Treskow	9–330	2006–2008	
Season 3 • Episodes 215–420
Christoph Kottenkamp	Steffen Feldhusen	191–420; 821–990	2007–2008; 2010–2011	
Sabine Vitua	Nina Olsen, née Fischer	201–424	2007–2008	
Season 4 • Episodes 421–597
Annett Kruschke	Charlotte Kröger	399–597	2008–2009	
Stephan Schill	Erik Siemers	418–597	2008–2009	
Season 5 • Episodes 598–798
Stephan Baumecker	Martin Ahrens	587–798	2009–2010	
Isabel Varell	Andrea Weller, née Roth	592–798	2009–2010	834–850 (2010)
Season 6 • Episodes 801–1000
Mona Klare	Gesa Matthiessen, née Grewe	801–1000	2010–2011	
Nicolas König	Tim Matthiessen	801–1000	2010–2011	
Season 7 • Episodes 1001–1200
Saskia Valencia	Katja Meissner	1001–1200	2011–2012	
Thorsten Nindel	Philipp Stein	1001–1200	2011–2012	
Season 8 • Episodes 1201–1400
Falk-Willy Wild	Clemens Winter	1196–1400	2012	
Elisabeth Lanz	Susann Winter aka Katharina Kupfer	1201–1400	2012	
Season 9 • Episodes 1401–1600
Timothy Peach	Jan Mertens	1387–1600	2012–2013	1796–1800 (2014)
Sandra Speichert	Vera Christiansen, née Lüder	1401–1600	2012–2013	
Season 10 • Episodes 1601–1814
Patrik Fichte	Ole Wolff	1586–1814	2013–2014	
Maike Bollow	Tine Hedelund	1601–1814	2013–2014	
Season 11 • Episodes 1815–2000
Jenny Jürgens	Jana Greve, née Carstens	1801–2000	2014–2015	
Klaus Zmorek	Sebastian Voss	1801–2000	2014–2015	
Season 12 • Episodes 2001–2200
Oliver Sauer	Lasse Petersen	1991–2175	2015–2016	
Anne Moll	Nora Franke aka Dr. Katrin Burgstett, née Körner	2001–2200	2015–2016	
Jochen Horst	Prof. Dr. Arthur Burgstett	2075–2200	2015–2016	
Season 13 • Episodes 2201–2400
Cheryl Shepard	Sydney Flickenschild #2	2201–2400	2016–2017	
Mickey Hardt	Mathis Segert	2201–2400	2016–2017	
Season 14 • Episodes 2401–2600
Jörg Pintsch	Peer Juncker	2391–2600	2017–2018	
Patricia Schäfer	Helen Fries	2400–2600	2017–2018	
Season 15 • Episodes 2601–2800
Madeleine Niesche	Sonja Röder née Bargfrede, adopt. Pasch	2601–2800	2018–2019	
Björn Bugri	Tilmann Oberberg	2602–2800	2018–2019	
Season 16 • Episodes 2801–3000
Gerit Kling	Hilke "Hilli" Pollmann née Elskop	2801–3000	2019	
Axel Buchholx	Frank Pollmann	2801–3000	2019	
Tom Mikulla	Dr. Cornelius Merz	2816–2985	2019	
Season 17 • Episodes 3001–3200
Phillip Oliver Baumgarten	Alexander "Alex" Maiwald	2986–3200	2019–2020	
Claudia Schmutzer	Astrid Richter	3001–3200	2019–2020	
Season 18 • Episodes 3201–3435
Martin Luding	Jens Reichard	3192–3435	2020–2021	3707–3710 (2023)
Jana Hora-Goosmann	Mona Reichar née Herzberg	3201–3435	2020–2021	3576–3580 (2022)
Judith Sehrbrock	Tatjana Petrenko	3201–3435	2020–2021	
Leander Lichti	Paul Tyler Jansen	3286–3435	2021	
Season 19 • Episodes 3436–3570
Nicole Ernst	Katrin Zeese née Brandt	3426–3570	2021–2022	
Daniel Hartwig	Leonardo Stefano "Leo" Greco	3438–3570	2021–2022	
Season 20 • Episodes 3571–3740
Theresa Hübchen	Sandra Reichard-Wilke née Reichard	3571–3795	2022–2023	
Makke Schneider	Dr. Matthias Wilke	3630–3794	2022–2023	
Season 21 • Episodes 3741–3890
Sarah Masuch	Anette Roth	3571–3890	2022–2023	
Harry Krüger	Ralf Sobotta	3741–3890	2023	
Season 22 • Episodes 3891–4064
Diana Staehly	Jördis Kilic	3881–4064	2023–2024	
Sebastian Deyle	Dr. Klaas Jäger	3891–4064	2023–2024	
Season 23 • Episodes 4065–4234
Lea Marlen Woitack	Svenja Jablonski	4058–4336	2024–2025	
Vivian Frey	Arthur Kaiser	4086–4239	2025	
Season 24 • Episodes 4235–4414
Eva-Maria Grein von Friedl	Beatrice Louise "Lou" Mahler née Mahler	4220–	2025–	
Daniel Fritz	Daniel Mahler	4220–	2025–	
Juana Nagel	Jess Böttcher	4233–	2025–	
Season 25 • Episodes 4415–
Theresa Scholze	Flora Mahler	4115–	2026–	
Nils Brunkhorst	Tom Hoppe	4116–	2026–	

=== Current main characters ===
Actor	Character	Episodes	Duration
Brigitte Antonius	Johanna Jansen	1–	2006–
Hermann Toelcke	Gunter Flickenschild	137–	2007–
Maria Fuchs	Carla Saravakos	400–1390, 1575–	2008–2012, 2013–
Jelena Mitschke	Dr. Britta Berger, née Thies	674–1830, 2051–	2009–2014, 2015–

florian odendahl richard kaiser 4222 2025

=== Former main actors ===
Actor	Character	Episodes	Duration
Gerry Hungbauer	Thomas Jansen	1–215, 329–2799, 2902–3450	2006–2007, 2008–2018, 2019–2021
Beat Marti	Jonas Münzing	3–195	2006–2007
Johanna Bönninghaus	Franziska Lutter	105–198	2007
Caroline Grothgar	Lynn Bergmann-Farlow, née Farlow	3–200	2006–2007
Christoph Mory	Ulrich "Uli" Wieland	1–269	2006–2008
Judith Hoersch	Christiane "Chris" Manthey	132–269	2007–2008
Jochen Kolenda	Werner Treskow	1–194, 271–330	2006–2007, 2008
Ingo Brosch	Dr. Jan Colbert	192–332	2007–2008
Rolf Nagel	Konrad Albers †	148–380	2007–2008
Roy Peter Link	Hans-Karl "Hacki" von Attendorn	1–370, 401–405	2006–2008
Nadine Arents	Carmen von Attendorn, née Marek	1–405	2006–2008
Matthias Paul	Roland Olsen	203–415	2007–2008
Alexander Granzow	Maximilian "Max" Olsen	201–285, 349–358, 374–380, 398–420	2007–2008
Sarah Hannemann	Emma Olsen	201–445	2007–2008
Eric Langner	Klaus Bach	400–553	2008–2009
Philipp Rafferty	Arndt Hanstedt	342–560	2008–2009
Karina Thayenthal	Alexandra Siemers, née Kröger	399–572	2008–2009
Doris Kunstmann	Melanie Baumann aka Melanie Albers	389–585	2008–2009
Anna Lena Class	Tanja Wieland, née Jansen	1–590	2006–2009
Valea Katharina Scalabrino	Marie Bach	411–595	2008–2009
Ernest Allan Hausmann	Kodjo Owusu-Asare	51–617	2007–2009
Rolf Zacher	Hans-Rudolf "Harry" Becker †	576–674	2009
Dirk Mierau	Sven Thiemann	612–780	2009–2010
Sarah Maria Besgen	Miriam Brehm	1–475, 618–787	2006–2008, 2009–2010
Kai Albrecht	Christian Mayenburg	616–789	2009–2010
Brigitte Janner	Margit Roth	693–770, 794–796	2009–2010
Pit Bukowski	Johnny Kruse	627–804	2009–2010
Dirk Moritz	Lennard "Lenny" Albers	353–824	2008–2010
Ulrike Kargus	Lena Weller †	594–835	2009–2010
Martin Becker	Hans-Jörg Krone jr.	592–650, 728, 798–915	2009, 2010, 2010
Joanna Semmelrogge	Rosa Becker	600–964	2009–2011
Sascha Tschorn	Felix Siemers	452–975	2008–2011
Barbara Magdalena Ahren	Elke Grewe	787–980	2010–2011
Fabian Oscar Wien	Paul Matthiessen	792–984	2010–2011
Oona Devi Liebich	Nele Matthiessen	806–984	2010–2011
Anne Apitzsch	Sophie Schwarz	812–987	2010–2011
Roswitha Schreiner	Maike Becker	317–795, 997–1000	2008–2010, 2011
Imke Büchel	Christa Haberland	808–1035	2010–2011
Hanna Lütje	Nadine Dorn	1003–1085	2011
Max Engelke	Dr. Oliver Hardenberg	897–1055, 1086–1090	2010–2011
Birgit Würz	Caroline von Walden	792–1140	2010–2011
Guido Broscheit	Falk Landau †	913–1149	2010–2011
Roman Rossa	Christoph Langer	1076–1159	2011
Susanne Steidle	Henriette Stein, née Bodenhausen	1023–1195	2011–2012
Sarah Alles	Ella Meissner	1011–1200	2011–2012
Carola Schnell	Fenja Winter #1	1202–1220	2012
Peter Rühring	Achim Meissner	991–1225	2011–2012
Daniel Popat	Rajan Shudrak	1056–1225	2011–2012
Uta Kargel	Fenja Winter #2	1271–1290	2012
Paul-Louis Pröve	Timo Saravakos #1	445–595, 1236–1249, 1296–1300	2008–2009, 2012, 2012
Gabriel Merz	Nils Rager aka Holger Seegert	436–630, 740–1015, 1341–1345	2008–2009, 2010–2011, 2012
Stefan Feddersen-Clausen	Vincent Vanlohen	1189–1375	2012
Christine Wilhelmi	Prof. Dr. Regina Harzfeld-Winter, née Harzfeld	1196–1385	2012
Johannes Terne	Roman Winter	1202–1260, 1305–1398	2012
Gunter Ziegler	Pete Johnson	1224–1410	2012
Peter Foyse	Lars Winter	1186–1440	2012–2013
Barbara Lanz	Birgit "Naomi" Lichtenhagen	1396–1515	2012–2013
Cuco Wallraff	Lorenzo Lombardi †	1466–1534	2013
Barbara Ricci	Benita Flickenschild aka Sophia Magnani †	1438–1587	2013
Rolf Nagel	Alfred Albers	537–1598	2009–2013
Alexander Becht	Brian O'Reilly	1586–1655	2013–2014
Bo Hansen	Sönke Mertens	1401–1675	2012–2014
Anika Lehmann	Rieke Friedrichs	1515–1725	2013–2014
Marcus Bluhm	Malte Neumann	1611–1780	2013–2014
Daniela Wutte	Lisa Fischer	1586–1788	2013–2014
Anna Willecke	Lotte Hedelund	1588–1710, 1734, 1811–1815	2013–2014
Tobias Rosen	Michael "Mick" Eckart	981–1829	2011–2014
Nela Schmitz	Bente Westphal	1202–1398, 1825–1829	2012, 2014
Alexandra M. Horn	Ariane Christiansen	1397–1840	2012–2014
Niklas Osterloh	Robin Mertens, adopted Detjen	1421–1560, 1791–1840	2013, 2014
Bettina Ratschew	Esther Hanstedt	335–797, 1820–1858	2008–2010, 2014
Klaus Christian Schreiber	Dirk Drechsler	1786–1940	2014–2015
Caroline Kiesewetter	Anne Lichtenhagen, née Ebinger	1001–1235, 1966–1975	2011–2012, 2015
Simon Mantei	Lutz Lichtenhagen	1786–1810, 1961–1975	2014, 2015
Johannes Brandrup	Prof. Dr. Maurice Greve	1806–1820, 1875–1994	2014–2015
Lara-Maria Wichels	Nathalie Greve	1791–1995	2014–2015
Jannik Nowak	Fabian Voss	1832–1995	2014–2015
Klaus Mikoleit	Dr. Udo Ebinger	1615–1620, 1701–1725, 1766–2185	2013, 2013, 2013–2016
Peggy Lukac	Inge Ebinger, née Rose	1597–1620, 1696–1725, 1777–2195	2013, 2013, 2013–2016
Gregory B. Waldis	Volker Carstens	2011–2199, 2295–2309	2015–2016, 2016
Cecil von Renner	Henri Carstens	1986–2220, 2305–2309	2015–2016, 2016
Kim-Sarah Brandts	Juliane "Jule" Jansen	1–643, 996–1000, 1201–1215, 1265–1675, 2311–2315	2006–2009, 2011, 2012, 2012–2014, 2016
Felix Everding	Dennis Grabowski	2206–2315	2016
Laura Preiss	Victoria "Vicky" Parker	2261–2324	2016
Leonie Landa	Edda Burgstett, accepted, née Franke	2026–2370	2015–2017
David C. Bunners	Holger Mielitzer †	2186–2385	2016–2017
Hedi Honert	Kimberley "Kim" Parker	2191–2405	2016–2017

== See also ==
- List of German television series
