= Ludger Pistor =

German actor (born 1959)

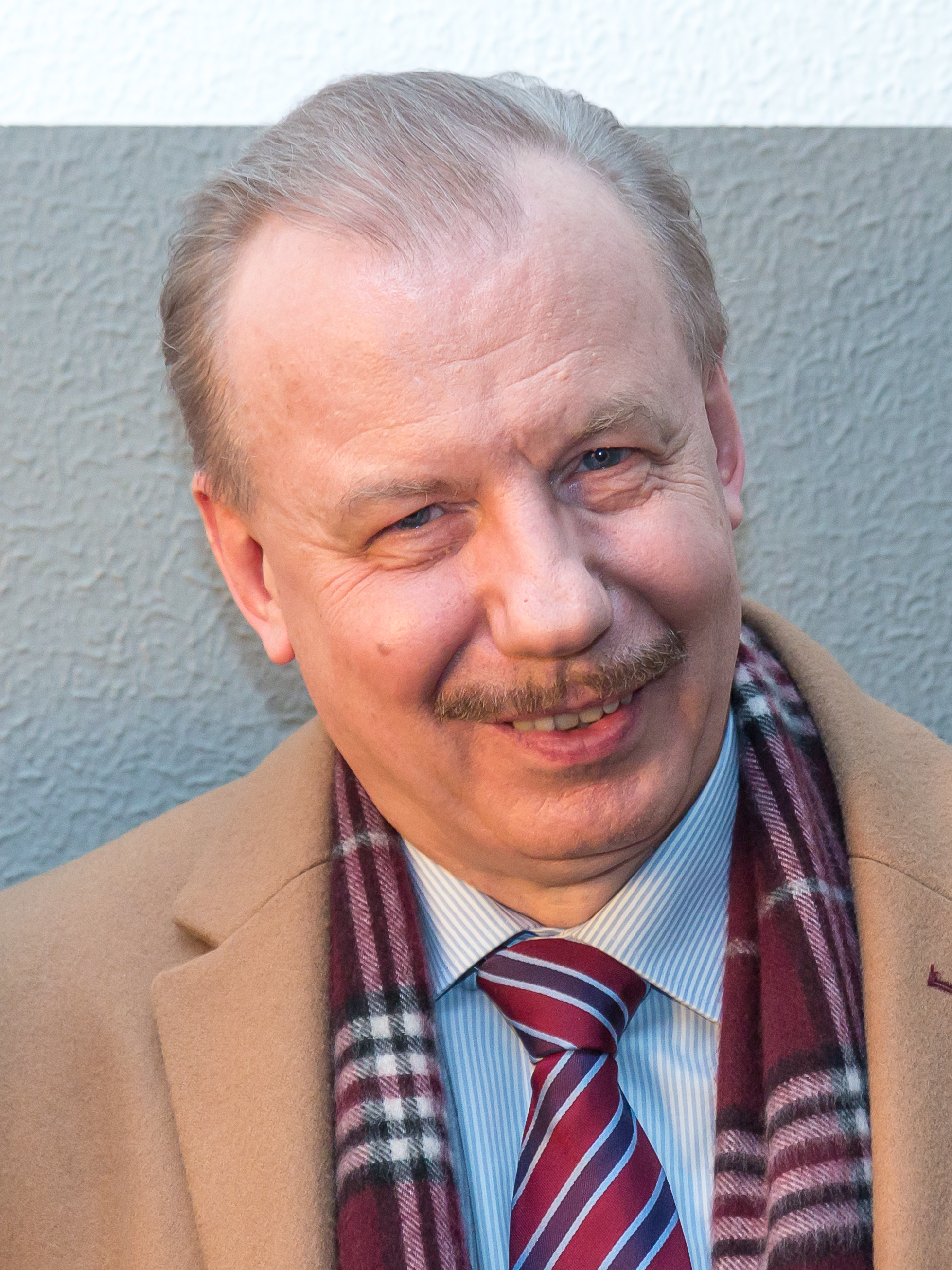
- Pistor in 2018
- Born: 16 March 1959 (age 67); Recklinghausen, North Rhine-Westphalia, West Germany
- Occupation: Actor
- Years active: 1986–present

Ludger Pistor (born 16 March 1959) is a German actor.

== Career ==
Born in Recklinghausen, Pistor has played many roles in numerous German-language films and TV productions. He has also appeared in English-language films including the Academy Award-winning Schindler's List and the 2006 James Bond film Casino Royale as the Swiss banker Mendel.

== Filmography ==
Year	Title	Role	Director	Notes
1986	The Name of the Rose	Mönche #13	Jean-Jacques Annaud	
1991	Pappa ante Portas	the director's assistant	Vicco von Bülow	
1993	Schindler's List	Josef Liepold	Steven Spielberg	
1995–2005	Balko	Klaus Krapp	miscellaneous	(TV series)
1996	Willi und die Windzors	Prince Charles	Hape Kerkeling	
1998	Run Lola Run	Mr Meier	Tom Tykwer	
2000	The Princess and the Warrior	Werner	Tom Tykwer	
2005–2006	Arme Millionäre	Fritz	miscellaneous	(TV series)
2006	Goldene Zeiten	Dieter Kettwig	Peter Thorwarth	
2006	Casino Royale	Mendel	Martin Campbell	
2009	Mord ist mein Geschäft, Liebling	Dr. Gruber	Sebastian Niemann	
2009	Inglourious Basterds	Wolfgang	Quentin Tarantino	
2009	Cutlet for Three	Wolfgang Krettek	Manfred Stelzer	TV film
2009	The Informant!	Reinhard Richter	Steven Soderbergh	
2011	X-Men: First Class	a German farmer/former SS officer	Matthew Vaughn	
2012	St George's Day	Werner Voss	Frank Harper	
2013	The Fifth Estate	the supervisor	Bill Condon	
2015	Woman in Gold	Wran	Simon Curtis	
2016	Young Light	Pfarrer Stürwald	Adolf Winkelmann	
2017	My Blind Date With Life	Lehrer Dongen		
