= Willi und die Windzors =

- DVD cover
- Written by: Doris Heinze (de); Hape Kerkeling
- Directed by: Hape Kerkeling
- Starring: Hape Kerkeling; Tana Schanzara (de); Brigitte Mira; Irm Hermann; Charles Brauer (de); Katharina Schubert; Ludger Pistor
- Original language: German

Production
- Running time: 85 minutes

Original release
- Release: 1996

Willi und die Windzors ("Willi and the Windzors") is a 1996 German comedic television film. Produced under the impression of the continued scandals surrounding members of the British royal family during the mid-1990s, the parody film presents an alternate history in which Britain becomes a republic, resulting in Queen Elizabeth II and her family (the Windsors, which is deliberately misspelled in the title) being expelled from their country and moving in with relatives in Germany. The film was directed by Hape Kerkeling, who also appears as the titular character, Willi Bettenberg (cf. Battenberg and the House of Mountbatten), the royal family's (fictitious) next of kin.

== Synopsis ==
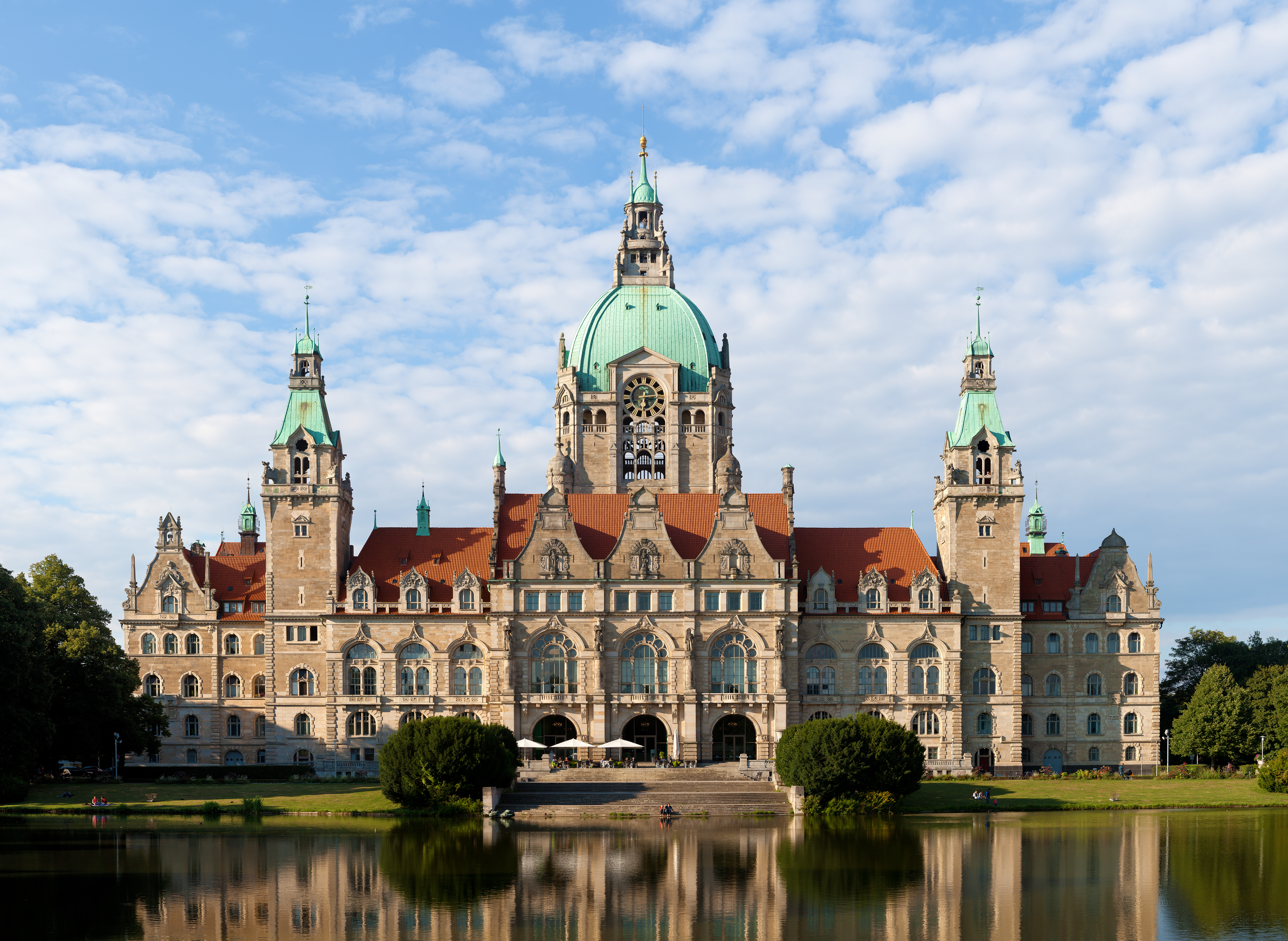
In the film, the town hall of Hanover is shown to become the new residence of the British royal family

Due to the "immoral behavior" of the royal family and the high cost of maintaining the royal court, the British parliament passes a bill to abolish the monarchy with immediate effect. Queen Elizabeth II (depicted as the stone-hearted head of the family), Queen Elizabeth the Queen Mother, Prince Philip, Duke of Edinburgh, who is shown to have a dysfunctional relationship with his son, Charles, Prince of Wales, as well as Diana, Princess of Wales (who is shown to blossom out having shed all her royal obligations), Princess Margaret, Countess of Snowdon (who is depicted as a deranged drinker), and the Princes William and Harry have to leave the country. Sarah, Duchess of York, and Prince Andrew, Duke of York, instead become members of the British workforce to pay off their mounting debt.

In Hanover, Germany, Willi Bettenberg lives in a small house together with his mother, struggling to make a living out of a furniture store. It turns out that he is the next relative of the British royal family, and suddenly finds them loaded off at his doorstep. As the royal family arrives without any money, Willi has them pay off for their stay by giving an autograph session at the furniture store, which greatly increases customer popularity and revenues. The former Queen turns out to be a great presenter of furniture, and Philipp's knowledge as a hunter makes him a highly regarded expert to the local zoo.

Getting accustomed to his new life, Prince Charles begins to write children's stories and finds a new love in Willi's fiancée, a masculine riding instructor. By contrast, Willi falls in love with Diana, which is met with high approval by his mother.

In order to find a new occupation and provide his family with a new home, Prince Charles runs as mayor of Hanover, the necessary funding having been won by Prince Philip during a horse race. Charles succeeds in winning the election, and the royal family takes up its new residence at the Hannover New Town Hall.

In the meantime, Great Britain feels the negative effects of not having a royal family anymore, with journalism and tourism being hit the hardest and hundreds and thousands of jobs having been lost. As a consequence, the British government decides to reinstate the monarchy. Prince Charles is asked to become the next king, but refuses in favor of his new life in Hanover. Instead, Willi marries Diana and becomes King William V.

== Cast ==
- Hape Kerkeling as Willi Bettenberg
- Tana Schanzara (de) as Else Bettenberg
- Brigitte Mira as Queen Elizabeth the Queen Mother
- Irm Hermann as Elizabeth II
- Charles Brauer (de) as Prince Philip, Duke of Edinburgh
- Ludger Pistor as Charles, Prince of Wales
- Katharina Schubert as Diana, Princess of Wales
- Elisabeth Ebeling as Princess Margaret, Countess of Snowdon
- Janette Rauch as Sarah, Duchess of York

== Production details ==
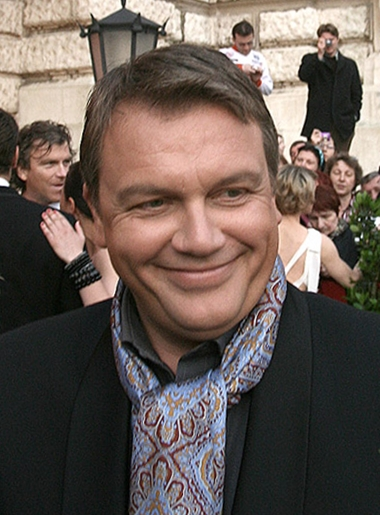
Hape Kerkeling in 2011

The film was produced by and originally aired at Norddeutscher Rundfunk. Filming took place in Hanover and Papenburg. The film opens and closes with a narrative by Hans Paetsch, whose distinctive voice is well known to a German audience because of his frequent work as teller of fairy tales.
