= Ursula Karusseit =

German actress (1939–2019)

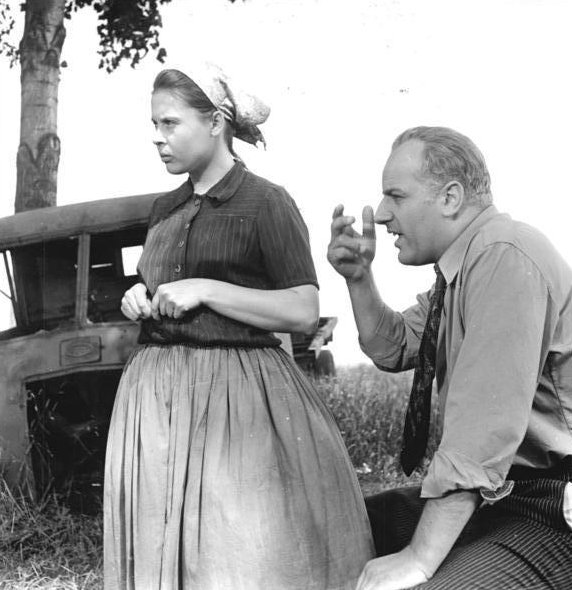
- Karusseit with Manfred Krug in Ways Across the Country in 1968
- Born: 2 August 1939; Elbing, East Prussia, Free State of Prussia, Nazi Germany (present-day Elbląg, Warmian-Masurian Voivodeship, Poland)
- Died: 1 February 2019 (aged 79); Berlin, Germany
- Occupation: Actress
- Spouse: Benno Besson
- Children: Pierre Besson

Ursula Karusseit (2 August 1939 – 1 February 2019) was a German actress.

== Life and career ==
Karusseit was born in Elbing, Germany (now Elbląg, Poland). After the expulsion from her hometown, she grew up Parchim and Gera. She studied at the State drama school in East Berlin until 1962 and gave her TV debut in "Was ihr wollt" (an adaption of Shakespeare's Twelfth Night) in 1963. Karrusseit appeared for a long time at the Volksbühne and became one of the most prominent stage actresses in East Germany.

From 1986 on she worked for appeared for three years as the eponymous character in Bertolt Brecht's play Mutter Courage und ihre Kinder (Mother Courage and Her Children) in Cologne.

In addition to her stage career, Karusseit also appeared in over 50 films and numerous television productions. Her role as Gertrud Habersaat in the TV-mini series Ways across the Country in 1968 also made her a well-known name in West Germany. In 1971 she portrayed German resistance fighter Hilde Coppi in Horst E. Brandt's KLK Calling PTZ – The Red Orchestra.

After the German reunification, Karusseit appeared for twenty years until her death in the German hospital series In aller Freundschaft, playing the operator of the hospital's cafeteria.

Karusseit married Benno Besson in 1969 and held Swiss citizenship through her marriage. She died of heart problems in Berlin, aged 79, on 1 February 2019.

== Filmography ==
Film
| Year | Title | Role | Notes |
|---|---|---|---|
| 1971 | KLK Calling PTZ - The Red Orchestra | Hilde Coppi | |
| 1974 | Der nackte Mann auf dem Sportplatz | Gisi Kemmel | |
| 1980 | Levins Mühle | Frau Rosinke | |
| 1981 | Die Stunde der Töchter | Ruth | |
| 1983 | Olle Henry | Rothaarige Dame Lola | |
| 1983 | Der entführte Prinz | Riesin | |
| 1984 | Film-Salabim | | |
| 1984 | Die vertauschte Königin | Königin und Schmiedin | |
| 1985 | Die Gänse von Bützow | Witwe Hornborstel | |
| 1993 | Wer zweimal lügt | Mrs. Mertens | |
| 1993 | Die Wildnis | | |
| 1999 | Nightshapes | Frau Gerhardt | |
| 1999 | Waschen, schneiden, legen | Mutter Schatz | |
| 2006 | Atomised | Großmutter | |
| 2008 | Where the Grass is Greener | Eva's Mother | |
| 2013 | King Ordinary | Karin Müller | |

TV
| Year | Title | Role | Notes |
|---|---|---|---|
| 1968 | Ways across the Country | Gertrud Habersaat | 5 episodes |
| 1998-2019 | In aller Freundschaft | Charlotte Gauß | 728 episodes, (final appearance) |

== Awards ==
- 1968: National Prize of the German Democratic Republic
- 2009: Goldene Henne (German media prize) for her lifetime achievement
