= Cheryl Shepard =

American actress based in Germany

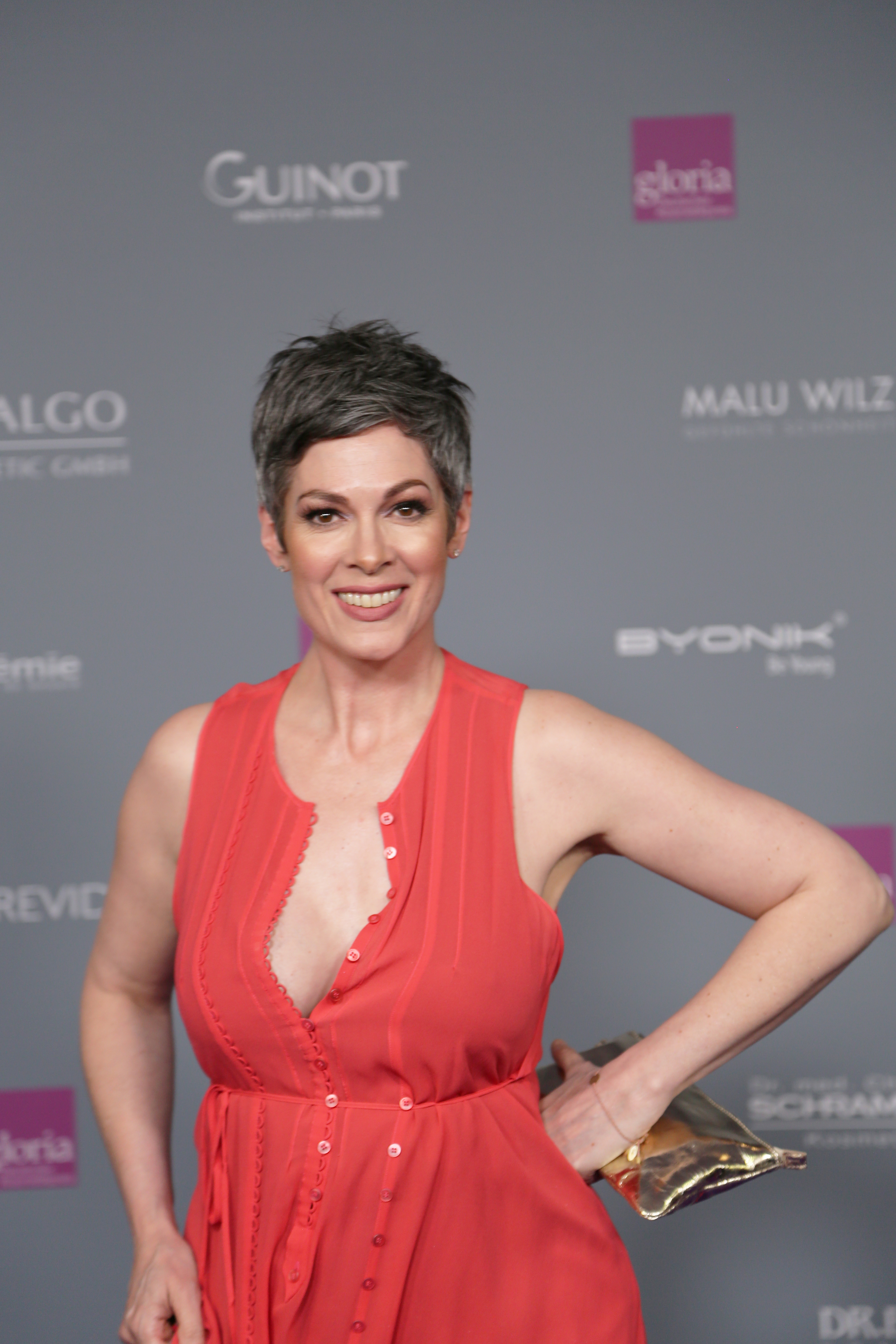
- Shepard in 2017
- Born: 5 February 1966; New York City, United States
- Occupation: Actress

Heidi Cheryl Shepard (born 5 February 1966 in New York City) is an American actress based in Germany. She gained fame through her role in German television series Hinter Gittern – Der Frauenknast ("Behind Bars - the Women's Prison") between 1997 and 2000. From 2003 to 2015, she appeared in hospital drama In aller Freundschaft ("In All Friendliness").

== Life and career ==
Shepard's family moved to Switzerland when she was four years old, where she grew up in Basel, Bern and Zürich. She attended drama school in Zürich, graduating in 1986. She gained stage experience at the Staatstheater Stuttgart and the Nationaltheater Mannheim.

In 1990, she moved to the Lake Constance area, where she oriented herself more towards film and television. She moved to Leipzig in 2007, where she still lives.

In 1997, she played her first major role in a television series, appearing in 80 episodes of Hinter Gittern – Der Frauenknast, playing Susanne Teubner, a character who killed her husband in a crime of passion. From 2003 to 2015, she played plastic surgeon and urologist Dr Elena Eichhorn in In aller Freundschaft. Following that, she struggled to find new roles and filed for bankruptcy. On 31 July 2015, she opened a café, Cheryl's Café, in Leipzig, but she had already closed the business by April 2016. Between May 2016 and April 2017, she played a leading role in the 13th season of telenovela Rote Rosen ("Red Roses").

She supports causes advocating cultural awareness and is an active member of the charity Hand in Hand International e.V. – Verein für Begegnung und Zusammenarbeit.

Shepard has been married to German actor Nikolaus Okonkwo since 2006. They have a biological son and two adopted children. She also has two adult daughters from her first marriage.

== Selected filmography ==
- 1990: Mit Leib und Seele (TV series, episode 2x05)
- 1997: Freunde fürs Leben (TV series)
- 1997: Der Mordsfilm (TV series, 3 episodes)
- 1997–2000: Hinter Gittern – Der Frauenknast (TV series, 80 episodes)
- 2001: Ein Vater zum Verlieben (TV film)
- 2002: Nesthocker – Familie zu verschenken (TV series, episodes 3x04–3x05)
- 2002: Sternenfänger (TV series, 26 episodes)
- 2003: In Search of an Impotent Man
- 2003–2015: In aller Freundschaft (TV series, 483 episodes)
- 2008: Der Arzt vom Wörthersee (TV series, episodes 1x03–1x04)
- 2010: Stuttgart Homicide (TV series, episode 1x06)
- 2011: In aller Freundschaft: Was wirklich zählt (feature film)
- 2015: Bluewater: Nightmare in Paradise (TV film)
- 2016–2017: Rote Rosen (telenovela, 199 episodes)
