= Ways across the Country =

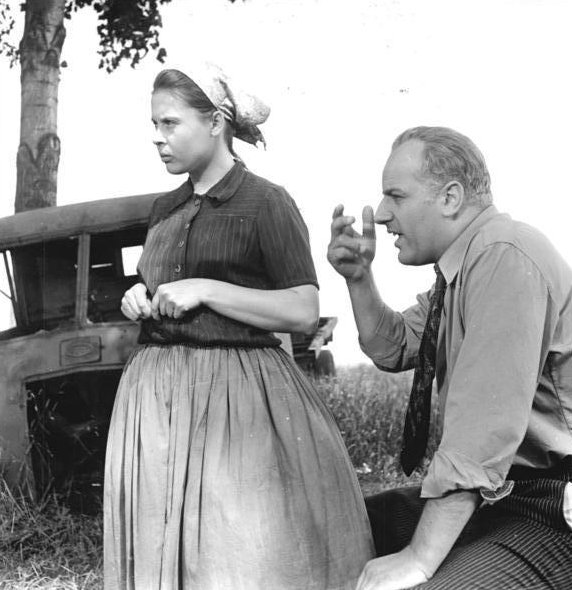
- Heyer convinces Gertrud to remain in Rakowen, episode III.
- Written by: Helmut Sakowski
- Starring: Ursula Karusseit; Manfred Krug
- Theme music composer: Siegfried Matthus
- Country of origin: East Germany
- Original language: German
- No. of episodes: 5 (re-edited to 6 in several TV channels)

Production
- Producer: Albrecht Langenbeck
- Running time: 445 minutes

Original release
- Network: Deutscher Fernsehfunk
- Release: 22 September – 27 September 1968

Ways across the Country (German: Wege übers Land) is a 1968 East German television miniseries, directed by Martin Ackermann.

== Plot ==
=== Episode I ===
November 1939. Gertrud Habersaat is a maid in the house of the Leßtorffs, the richest farmers in Rakowen, a village in Mecklenburg. She is pregnant with Jürgen Leßtorff's baby, and hopes he will marry her. But after returning from the war in Poland, he forsakes her in favor of Countess Palvner and joins Hans Frank's staff in the newly formed General Government. Gertrud is forced to have an abortion and to marry Emil Kalluweit, a landless worker. Willi Heyer, a communist recently released from prison who was on probation in Rakowen, escapes to join the underground.

=== Episode II ===
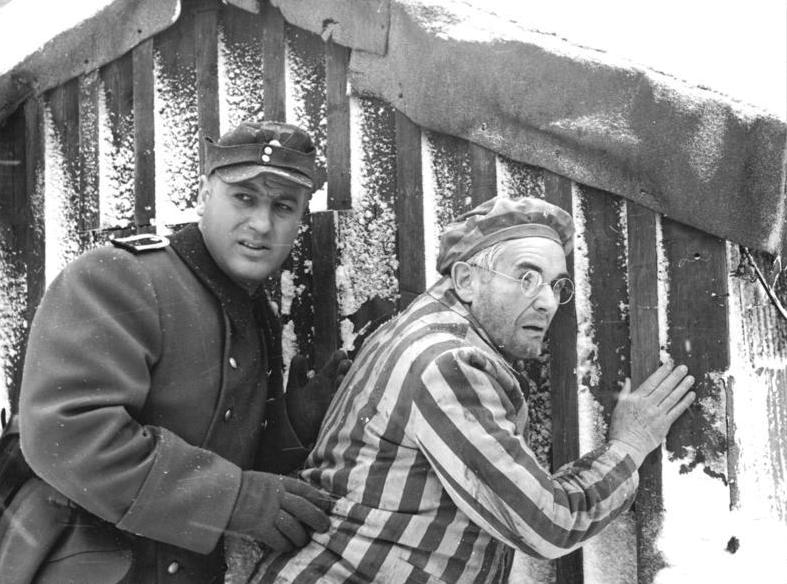
Heyer, disguised as an SS guard, helps Pinarski to flee the camp.

Kalluweit is given a farm in Poland, where he and his wife are to be part of the new 'Master Race'. They witness the brutal deportation of the local Poles. Gertrud saves a little girl, Mala, who is harassed by SS men and adopts her. Heyer, who is now imprisoned in a concentration camp, saves Polish professor Pinarski from the AB Action; they escape the camp. When Gertrud discovers that Mala is Jewish, she finds Leßtorff and convinces him to arrange fake papers for her; he agrees, on condition that she takes in another child, Stefan. Kalluweit volunteers to join the Wehrmacht after SS officer Schneider wants to draft him to his organization.

=== Episode III ===
In 1945, Gertrud and the children flee the Red Army. She returns to Rakowen, where Heyer is appointed mayor by the Soviet authorities. Leßtorff returns, after hiding his wartime activities from his British captors. Heyer confiscates the rich farmers' cows to provide milk for the starving children of the refugees. When Heyer leaves to meet the Soviet commandant, the wealthy villagers seize power again. Schneider, who hides in Leßtorff's farm, threatens Gertrud not to reveal his identity. She leaves the village, but the returning Heyer convinces her to stay. He confronts the villagers and wins them over. Gertrud exposes Schneider, who kills Jürgen while trying to escape. Countess Palvner, who owned most of the village's land, is deported and her possessions are re-distributed to her former serfs.

=== Episode IV ===
The need to modernize and to maximize production leads most of the villagers to agree to the formation of an agricultural cooperative. Gertrud resists the plans to hand over her land, but Heyer convinces her to accept it, and she eventually becomes the chairperson of the new cooperative.

=== Episode V ===
Emil Kalluweit, now a rich West German businessman, returns to the village and tries to convince Gertrud to leave with him. Stefan's mother is revealed to be alive, and visits her son, who is torn between her and his German upbringing. Gertrud decides to remain in Rakowen, starting a new life with Heyer.

== Cast ==
- Ursula Karusseit - Gertrud Habersaat
- Manfred Krug - Willi Heyer
- Armin Mueller-Stahl - Jürgen Leßtorff
- Gerd Michael Henneberg - Friedrich-Wilhelm Krüger
- Angelica Domröse - Countess Palvner
- Anna Prucnal - Steffa
- Lothar Bellag - Hans Frank
- Christa Lehmann - Gertrud's mother
- Erika Pelikowsky - Jürgen's mother
- Erik S. Klein - Emil Kalluweit
- Katharina Hercher - little Mala Zimmerbaum (episodes II-III)
- Anne-Kathrein Kretzschmar - older Mala (episodes IV-V)
- Berko Acker - older Stefan
- Renate Rennhack - Martha Heyer
- Carmen-Maja Antoni - Irma
- Hans Klering - Leitkow
- Hans Hardt-Hardtloff - Siebold
- Ireneusz Kanicki - Jan
- Marian Melman - Pinarski
- Volkmar Kleinert - Schneider
- Ingolf Gorges - Fredi Neuschulz
- Otto Dierichs - Mr. Heinemann
- Erich Brauer - Hänsel
- Alwin Brosch - Frenzel
- Harry Merkel - miller
- Margit Bendokat - miller's wife
- Fritz Dallmann - blacksmith
- Aleksandra Karzyńska - Stefan's mother

== Production ==
The series' script was written by the East German author Helmut Sakowski, who was already well known for his historical novels set in Mecklenburg. Its main theme, the portrayal of villagers' life, was common in East Germany's television during the late 1960s. The country's cultural establishment endorsed this trend, as a means to reach West German audiences: since West Germany had virtually no "agrarian-based" TV series at the time, it was hoped that such entertainment would attract Western viewers and improve the GDR's image. Ways across the Country was the most notable show to employ this feature. Another significant motif of the plot was the depiction of the wartime expulsion of Germans, a sensitive subject that was rarely dealt with openly at the time.

== Reception ==
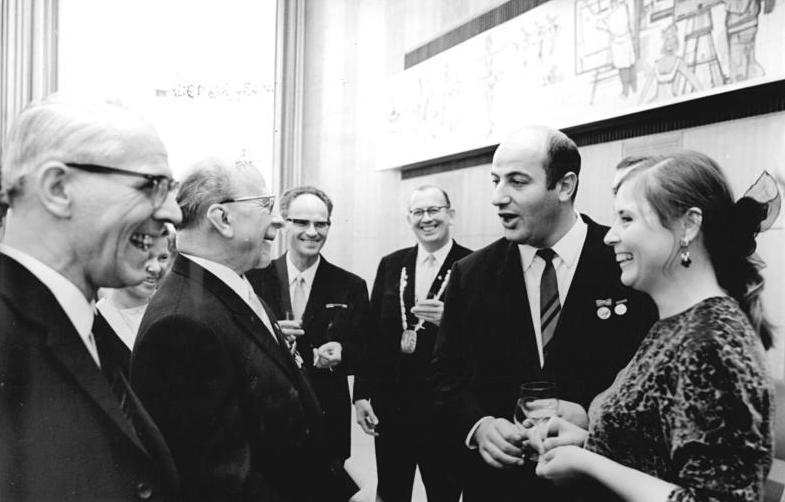
Manfred Krug and Ursula Karusseit receive the National Prize from Walter Ulbricht, 3 October 1968.

The series was broadcast in the evenings during a single week in September 1968, from the 22nd to the 27th. It was highly successful: according to rating surveys, 77.7% of East Germany's television viewers watched Wege übers Land. Deutscher Fernsehfunk therefore calculated it had an audience of some 7.8 million in the Democratic Republic alone. It was also well received in West Germany.

On 3 October 1968, Sakowski, director Martin Eckermann, cinematographer Hans-Jürgen Heimlich, dramatist Helga Korff-Edel and actors Ursula Karusseit, Christa Lehmann and Manfred Krug were all awarded the National Prize, 1st degree, for their work on the series. The VI East German Writers Congress devoted a discussion to the series, during which it was met by considerable approval. In 1969, Sakowski released a novel based on his script, by the same name, that was also adapted for theater.

The series was frequently re-aired in the following decades. In 1983, as the Stasi adopted a policy of 'no traitors on screen', it attempted to forbid its re-screening since several of the leading actors - including Armin Mueller-Stahl, Manfred Krug and Angelica Domröse - had moved to West Germany. Sakowski used his influence as the deputy-chairman of the GDR's Cultural Association to prevent this, and the series had another re-run in 1984. In 2010, it was released on DVD.
