= Jochen Horst =

German film, TV and theater actor (born 1961)

- Born: 7 September 1961 (age 64); Osnabrück, West Germany (now Germany)
- Occupation: Actor

Jochen Horst (born 7 September 1961 in Osnabrück) is a German film, TV and theater actor.

Horst graduated in 1986 from the state Academy of Music and Performing Arts (Staatliche Hochschule für Musik und Darstellende Kunst) in Graz, Austria, summa cum laude. Subsequently, Horst went to London to attend the Lee Strasberg Institute for two years, furthering his studies of Method Acting.

Together with Anne Bennent, Horst received the O.-E.-Hasse-Preis in 1986 for Best Newcomer of the Year. For his leading role in German TV series Balko, Horst was awarded with the Grimme-Preis for Best Actor in 1996.

Horst lives in Spain with his family.

== Filmography (selected) ==
- 1988: Always Afternoon (TV Series) - Franz Muller
- 1991: Rothenbaumchaussee (TV Movie) - Hannes Hacker
- 1992: Krücke - Ehemann
- 1992: The Cement Garden - Derek, Julie's Friend
- 1993: Swing Kids - Speaker at H.J. Rally
- 1995-1998: Balko (TV Series) - Kriminalhauptkommissar Stefan Balko / Cousin Werner
- 1998: Der Handymörder (TV Movie) - Dr. Victor Roth
- 1999: Die Blendung (TV Movie) - Daniel Rottländer
- 2001: Tatort (TV Series) - Peter Forster
- 2002: Die Westentaschenvenus (TV Movie) - Dr. Phillip Weiße
- 2002: Bella Block (TV Series) - Krambeck
- 2003: Luther - Professor Carlstadt
- 2004-2006: Typisch Sophie (TV Series) - Jo Hennecke
- 2005: Nero (TV Movie)
- 2008-2011: Die Stein (TV Series) - Stefan Hagen
- 2015-2016: Rote Rosen (TV Series) - Arthur Burgstett
