= Typisch Sophie =

- Created by: Brigitte Müller
- Starring: Sophie Schütt; Bernhard Schir; Jochen Horst; Doris Kunstmann; Bettina Lamprecht; Hannes Wegener
- Country of origin: Germany
- No. of seasons: 2
- No. of episodes: 18

Original release
- Release: October 28, 2004

Typisch Sophie is a German legal drama television series. The series premiered in Germany in October 2004 and ran for two seasons before being cancelled due to low TV ratings in 2006.

== Content ==
Sophie Andersen is a single mom and has been working as a secretary for the last few years. When her company goes bankrupt she decides to take a new challenge and apply at a law office.

== See also ==
- List of German television series
