= Ralph Morgenstern =

German actor and TV host

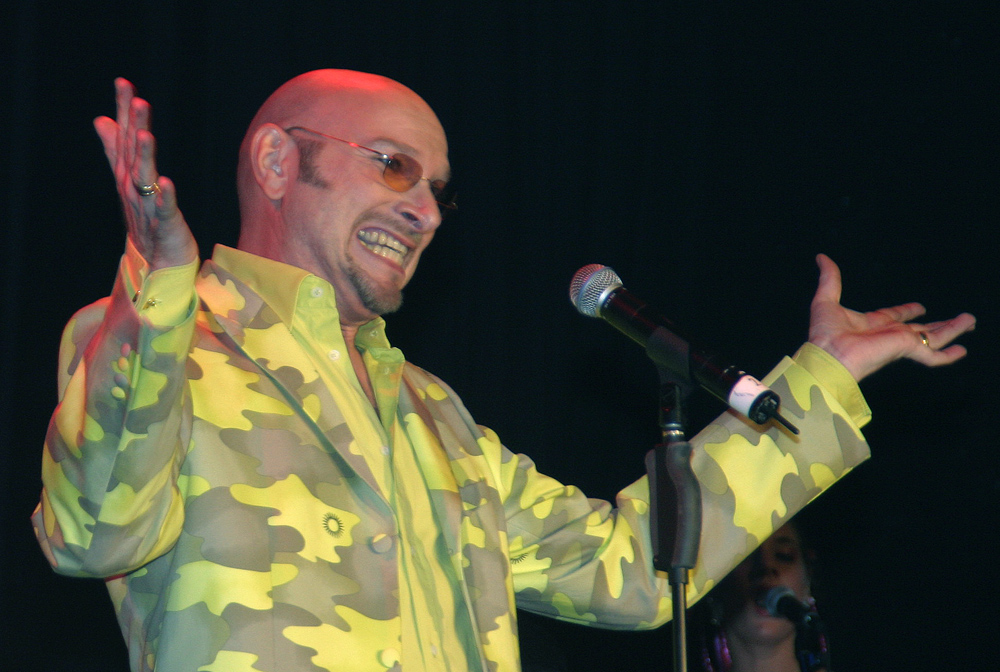
Ralph Morgenstern.

Ralph Morgenstern (born as Ralph Morgenstern-Nolting on 3 October 1956) is a German actor and TV host.

Morgenstern was born in Mülheim an der Ruhr. He works in theatre, film, and on German TV. Morgenstern has one daughter and has lived together with his partner Oliver since 2005.

== Actor in theatre ==
- 1984-1986: Geierwally (Filmdose, Köln, Regie: Walter Bockmayer)
- 1989-1990: Sissi - Beuteljahre einer Kaiserin (Filmdose, Köln, Regie: Walter Bockmayer)
- 1991-1998: Festes Ensemble am Kölner Schauspielhaus
- 1995 - Tankstelle der Verdammten (Kölner Schauspielhaus)
- 1998 - Mephisto (Kölner Schauspielhaus)
- 1998 - Faust (Kölner Schauspielhaus)
- 2003 - Die Banditen (Oper Köln)
- 2006-2007 - Kiss me Kate (Musikalische Komödie der Oper Leipzig)

== Actor in films ==
- 1984: Im Himmel ist die Hölle los (directed by Helmer von Lützelburg), as Mr. Raffo
- 1988: The Vulture Wally (directed by Walter Bockmayer), as Aunt Luckard
- 1994: Die Wache: Vollmond (TV episode, directed by Bob Blagden), as Cross-dresser
- 1995: Ein Mann für gewisse Stunden (TV film)
- 1997: Das erste Semester (directed by Uwe Boll), as Restaurantleiter
- 1999: Gisbert (TV series, directed by Jojo Wolff or Hape Kerkeling), as Mr Faulhaber
- 2000: Schöne Aussichten (TV miniseries, directed by Rüdiger Nüchtern), as Fred Holmann
- 2000: I Love You, Baby (directed by Nick Lyon), as Sickenberger
- 2000: Die Anrheiner: Der beste Ort der Welt (TV episode), as Florian Finkel
- 2001: Ausziehn! (directed by Peter Morlock), as Lex Montgomery

Voice Actor

- 2004: Derrick – Die Pflicht ruft (directed by Michael Schaack), as Linda
- 2006: Das kleine Arschloch und der alte Sack – Sterben ist Scheiße (directed by Michael Schaack)

== TV Host ==
- 1992 - Filmdosenshow (RTL, together with Hella von Sinnen)
- 1993 - XOV bei VOX
- 1994 - Klatschmohn (WDR)
- 1995-2002 - Kaffeeklatsch (ZDF)
- 2001-2007 - Blond am Freitag (host; Comedy-Wochenrückblick des ZDF)
- 2005-2007 - ZDF-Fernsehgarten
