= Hendrikje Fitz =

German actress (1961–2016)

- Born: 15 September 1961; Frankfurt am Main, West Germany
- Died: 7 April 2016 (aged 54); Berlin, Germany
- Occupation: Actress
- Years active: 1989–2016

Hendrikje Fitz (15 September 1961 – 7 April 2016) was a German actress best known for her role as Pia Heilmann on the ARD soap opera In aller Freundschaft.

== Films ==
- 1989: Reise hinter den Spiegel
- 1990: Das Haus am Watt
- 1998: Die Cleveren (television series, ep. "Du stirbst, wie ich es will")
- 1998–2016: In aller Freundschaft (television series)
- 2000: Fieber – Ärzte für das Leben (television series, ep. "Wettlauf mit dem Tod")
- 2000: Tatort: Tödliches Verlangen (television)
- 2001: Alphateam – Die Lebensretter im OP (television series, ep. "Viel Rauch um Nichts")
- 2001: Ist gut jetzt
- 2002: Wolffs Revier (television series)
- 2002: Dr. Sommerfeld – Neues vom Bülowbogen (television series, ep. "Hektik, Panik, Erotik")
- 2002: Ripley's Game
- 2004: Männer im gefährlichen Alter
- 2011: In aller Freundschaft: Was wirklich zählt
- 2014: Stuttgart Homicide (television series, ep. "Bunker")
- 2015: Das perfekte Promi-Dinner (television show)
- 2015: Los Veganeros

== Death ==
Hendrikje Fitz died in 2016 from cancer, aged 55.
