= Total Normal =

- Starring: Hape Kerkeling
- Country of origin: Germany

Total Normal (Totally Normal) is a German television series.

== See also ==
- List of German television series
