= Elisabeth Ebeling =

German actress (1946–2020)

- Born: 15 October 1946; Isernhagen, Hanover, Germany
- Died: 16 July 2020 (aged 73); Aachen, North Rhine-Westphalia, Germany
- Occupation: Actress
- Awards: Kurt-Sieder-Preis

Elisabeth Ebeling (15 October 1946 – 16 July 2020) was a German film and stage actress. She received the Kurt-Sieder-Preis in 2013. In total, she played several hundred roles and was involved with famous directors, including Rainer Werner Fassbinder and Klaus Michael Grüber.

Ebeling died in Aachen on 16 July 2020, aged 73.

== Filmography (selected) ==
- 1989: C*A*S*H: A Political Fairy Tale
- 1996: Willi und die Windzors
- 1996: Stolz
- 1999: Der letzte Zeuge (1 Episode)
- 1999: Für alle Fälle Stefanie (1 Episode)
- 2003: Red and Blue
- 2006: Durst haben
- 2007: TRUST.Wohltat
