= Wer wird Millionär? =

German television game show

- Logo (2000–2008)
- Genre: Game show
- Based on: Who Wants to Be a Millionaire? by: David Briggs; Mike Whitehill; Steven Knight
- Presented by: Günther Jauch
- Country of origin: Germany
- Original language: German

Production
- Running time: about 45 minutes 180 minutes (celebrity edition)
- Production companies: Celador (1999–2007); 2waytraffic (2007–2020); Sony Pictures Television (2020–present); Endemol (1999–2015); Endemol Shine Germany (2015–present)

Original release
- Network: RTL
- Release: 3 September 1999 – present

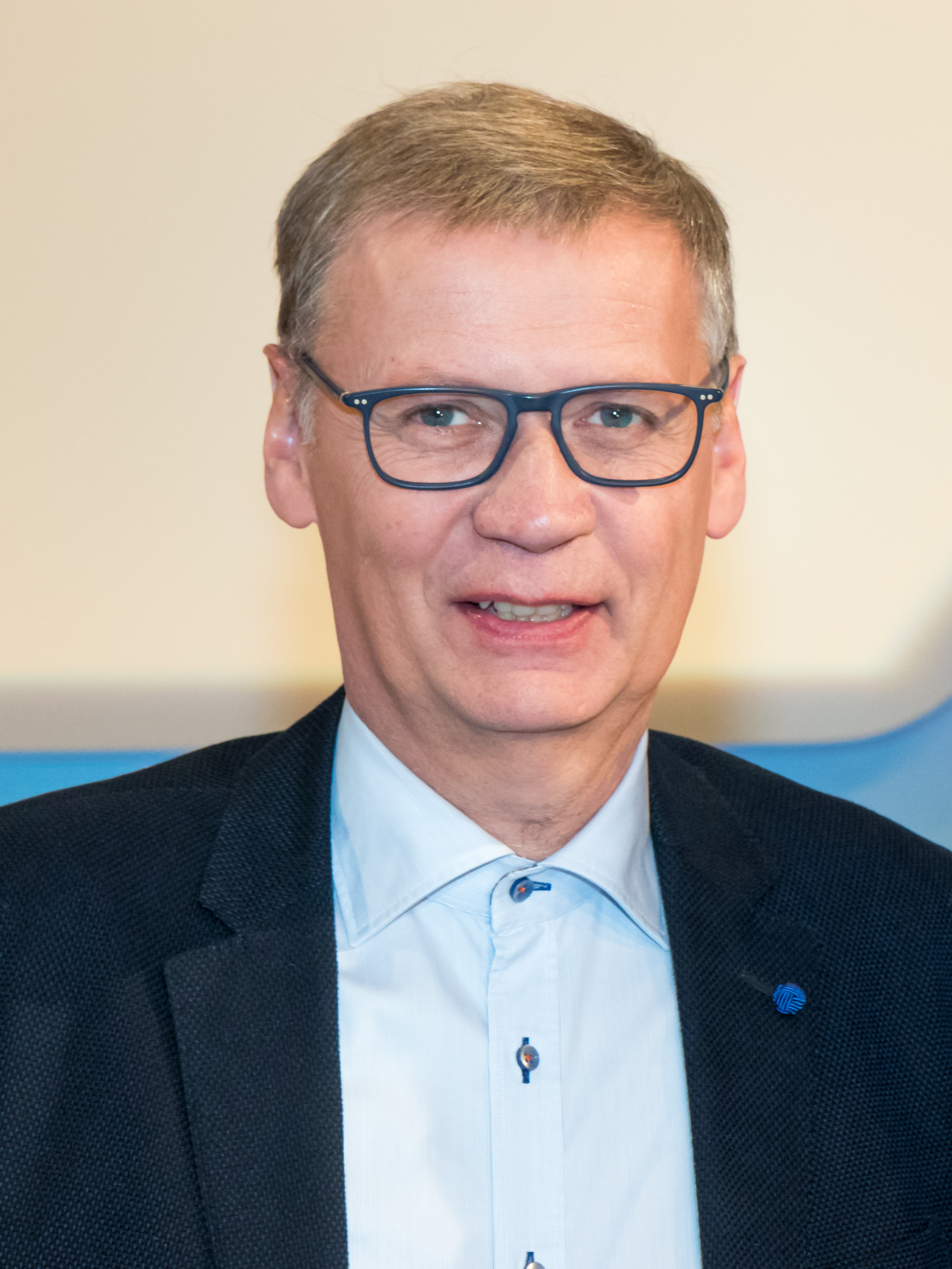
Host Günther Jauch

Wer wird Millionär? is a German game show based on the original British format Who Wants to Be a Millionaire?. It is shown on RTL on Mondays at 20:15, hosted by Günther Jauch. The show has broadcast continuously since 3 September 1999 and is one of the longest running versions of Millionaire worldwide.

The main goal of the show is to win €1 million (previously DM 1 million) by answering fifteen multiple-choice questions correctly. Contestants who answer the fifth question correctly are guaranteed to leave with at least €500 and those who answer the tenth question correctly with at least €16,000. Since 2007, contestants have had the option to use the 'Risk' format and replace the second safety net with a fourth lifeline.

Contestants from outside Germany are able to participate if they speak German, with contestants from Austria and Switzerland among previous participants.

== Gameplay ==
The game follows the basic international format and uses the original three lifelines of the British version. The German terms for the three lifelines - der fünfzig-fünfzig-Joker (50:50), Telefonjoker (Phone-a-Friend) and Publikumsjoker (Ask the Audience) have been entries in the Duden, the German dictionary, since 2012.

Since 2007, contestants have had a Zusatzjoker ("additional lifeline"), which allows the contestant to ask a member of the audience who thinks they know the answer. They have to sacrifice the second safety net if they wish to take this option. If the member of the audience gives the right answer, they will win €500. The contestant can follow the chosen person but they don't have to. If the contestant walks away and does not trust the chosen person but the answer is right, the chosen person will nevertheless win €500 because they got the correct answer.

=== Money trees ===
Question number	Question value (Yellow zones are the guaranteed levels)				
Question number	1999–2001	2002–present	Gamblers' Special (Note: In this version, the possible wins are increased significantly. However, if you use a lifeline before the tenth question, all other lifelines will be taken away as well. Also, there is no second guaranteed sum at question 10.) (2013–present)	1,500th episode (2021)	3 Million Euro Week (2022–present)
1	100 DM (€51.13)	€50	€100	€1	€100
2	200 DM (€102.26)	€100	€200	€5	€200
3	300 DM (€153.39)	€200	€300	€55	€400
4	500 DM (€255.65)	€300	€500	€111	€500
5	1,000 DM (€511.29)	€500	€1,000	€555	€1,000
6	2,000 DM (€1,022.58)	€1,000	€2,000	€1,111	€2,000
7	4,000 DM (€2,045.17)	€2,000	€4,000	€2,222	€5,000
8	8,000 DM (€4,090.34)	€4,000	€8,000	€4,444	€10,000
9	16,000 DM (€8,180.67)	€8,000	€16,000	€8,888	€20,000
10	32,000 DM (€16,361.34)	€16,000 (Note: not applicable in case of choosing the fourth lifeline/selected before the beginning)	€32,000 (Note: from this question, you can use all lifelines)	€15,555 (4 lifelines) €33,333 (3 lifelines)	€30,000
11	64,000 DM (€32,722.68)	€32,000	€64,000	€55,555	€50,000
12	125,000 DM (€63,911.49)	€64,000	€125,000	€77,777	€100,000
13	250,000 DM (€127,822.97)	€125,000	€250,000	€133,333	€250,000
14	500,000 DM (€255,645.94)	€500,000	€750,000	€555,555	€900,000
15	1,000,000 DM (€511,291.88)	€1,000,000	€2,000,000	€1,500,000	€3,000,000

== Die 3-Millionen-Euro-Woche ==
Since 2021, each season of the show has had a €3 million week. In this version of the show, five episodes are stripped across a week. For the first four episodes, contestants play the game as normal, but those who win €16,000 or more are invited back to play on the Friday night.

On the Friday night, all the qualifiers from throughout the week are gathered and, starting with the contestant who earned the highest, Jauch will make them an offer of a guaranteed amount to play the game again. If they accept, they play a money tree in which the usual values are roughly doubled and must play the Risk format. Nobody has won the €3,000,000 top prize, but the highest winner is Anja Beyer, from Lampertheim, who won a combined €290,000 on 6 January 2022.

== Top-prize winners ==
These are the questions with which people have won the biggest prize.

- Eckhard Freise (2 December 2000)

DM 1 Million (15 of 15) – no time limit

With whom did Edmund Hillary stand on top of the Mount Everest in 1953?

1. Nasreddin Hodscha
2. Nursay Pimsorn
3. Tenzing Norgay(correct answer)
4. Abrindranath Singh
- Marlene Grabherr (20 May 2001)

DM 1 Million (15 of 15) – no time limit

Which of the two Gibb brothers from the popband The-Bee-Gees are twins?

1. Robin and Barry
2. Maurice and Robin(correct answer)
3. Barry and Maurice
4. Andy and Robin

Marlene Grabherr died in 2013 at the age of 60.

- Gerhard Krammer (18 October 2002)

€1,000,000 (15 of 15) – no time limit

Which famous writer, as an architecture graduate, built a pool of water in Zurich?

1. Joseph Roth
2. Martin Walser
3. Max Frisch(correct answer)
4. Friedrich Dürrenmatt
- Dr. Maria Wienströer (29 March 2004)

€1,000,000 (15 of 15) – no time limit

Who won the Nobel Prize in Chemistry in 1954 and Nobel Peace Prize in 1962?

1. Linus Pauling(correct answer)
2. Otto Hahn
3. Pearl S. Buck
4. Albert Schweitzer
- Stefan Lang (9 October 2006)

€1 million (15 of 15) – no time limit

Which chemical element makes up more than one half of the mass of the human body?

1. Carbon
2. Calcium
3. Oxygen(correct answer)
4. Iron
- Timur Hahn (8 January 2007) – With the help of his brother as a phoned friend

€1 million (15 of 15) – no time limit

Which sea is named after a mythological king who is said to have plunged into it?

1. Ionian Sea
2. Aegean Sea(correct answer)
3. Adriatic Sea
4. Caspian Sea
- Oliver Pocher (30 May 2008) (celebrity version) – With the help of 'Ask the Audience'

€1 million (15 of 15) – no time limit

The Nagel-Schreckenberg Model provides an explanation for the emergence of...?

1. Desert
2. Traffic congestion(correct answer)
3. Influenza
4. Stock market
- Thomas Gottschalk (20 November 2008) (celebrity version) – With the help of Marcel-Reich Ranicki as a phoned friend

€1 million (15 of 15) – no time limit

What was the name of Franz Kafka's last companion, that he met in 1923, one year before his death?

1. Dora Diamant(correct answer)
2. Sarah Saphir
3. Rita Rubin
4. Olga Opal
- Ralf Schnoor (26 November 2010) – He phoned a friend but he did not need his help. He told him he would win the million euros. His behaviour was similar to John Carpenter's, the first ever million winner of the entire franchise.

€1 million (15 of 15) – no time limit

What is the name of the first German postage stamp, which was brought in the kingdom of Bavaria in 1849?

1. Schwarzer Einser (One kreuzer black)(correct answer)
2. Roter Zweier (Two kreuzer red)
3. Gelber Dreier (Three kreuzer yellow)
4. Blauer Vierer (Four kreuzer blue)
- Barbara Schöneberger (30 May 2011) (celebrity edition) – With the help of Pankraz Freiherr von Freyberg as a phoned friend.

€1 million (15 of 15) – no time limit

What is the name of the boy from whose head Wilhelm Tell shoots the legendary apple?

1. Fritz
2. Heinrich
3. Walter(correct answer)
4. August
- Sebastian Langrock (11 March 2013)

€1 million (15 of 15) – no time limit

Who should be familiar with the twenty-past-four position?

1. Driving instructor
2. Karate master
3. Waiter(correct answer)
4. Agricultural architect
- Thorsten Fischer (17 October 2014) (15th anniversary) – You could go to the million euro question after reaching question 10 and jump to the €1 Million question. But if you chose this, you could not walk away. Answering incorrectly meant you dropped back to €500. Fischer chose to hear the €1 Million question after reaching question 10 and answered correctly.

€1 million (11 of 11) – no time limit

The distance from the German capital Berlin to the center of the Earth is approximately the same as that between Berlin and...?

1. Tokyo
2. Cape Town
3. Moscow
4. New York(correct answer)
- Nadja Sidikjar (13 November 2015) (2nd Jackpot special) – In the jackpot special the total number of money increases, with every players' winning total being added to the prize pool. One contestant wins the entire amount; the rest of them go home empty handed. In the 2nd jackpot special there was a head-to-head between two candidates. The first contestant to answer three questions correctly scooped the total prize. Nadja Sidikjar's last question was:

€1,538,450 - 5 seconds

Which of these instrument names is an abbreviation?

1. Violin
2. Cello(correct answer)
3. Double bass
4. Guitar
- Leon Windscheid (7 December 2015)

€1 million (15 of 15) – no time limit

How many cubes does the cube designed by Ernö Rubik consist of?

1. 22
2. 24
3. 26(correct answer)
4. 28
- Jan Stroh (2 September 2019) (20th anniversary) – Every question Stroh had to answer had already been asked in the past 20 years of the show. He also received four lifelines (Phone A Friend being replaced with a second Ask one of the Audience) and the guaranteed level at €16,000 which is usually disabled when contestants choose the additional Ask one of the Audience. This €1,000,000 question had previously been asked to Hape Kerkeling in 2002.

Question from 2002

€1 million (15 of 15) – no time limit

Which fairytale by the Brothers Grimm does not begin with the words "Once upon a time..."?

1. Rumpelstiltskin
2. Hans in Luck(correct answer)
3. The Star Money
4. Little Red Riding Hood
- Ronald Tenholte (24 March 2020)

€1 million (15 of 15) – no time limit

The classic, standardized EUR-pallet EPAL1 consists of 78 nails, nine blocks and how many boards?

1. Nine
2. Ten
3. Eleven(correct answer)
4. Twelve

== Top-prize losers ==
- Georges Devalois Yepnang Mouhoutou (17 October 2014) (15th anniversary) – Mouhoutou is currently the only contestant in the German version of the Millionaire franchise who answered the final question incorrectly. He also chose to go for the million after reaching question 10. As he chose to play with all four lifelines and had to answer, he dropped from €1,000,000 to €500. He answered a, but the correct answer is b.

€1 million (11 of 11) – no time limit

What was invented within a radius of 20 kilometres within 5 years?

1. Otto engine & Diesel engine(chosen; incorrect answer)
2. Basketball & Volleyball(correct answer)
3. Gyros Pita & Doner Kebap
4. Toothbrush & Toothpaste
