= In aller Freundschaft =

German television soap opera

- Starring: Thomas Rühmann; Dieter Bellmann; Ursula Karusseit; Alexa Maria Surholt; Andrea Kathrin Loewig; Arzu Bazman; Thomas Koch; Hendrikje Fitz; Bernhard Bettermann; Rolf Becker; Udo Schenk; Julia Jäger; Michael Trischan; Jascha Rust; Christina Petersen; Annett Renneberg; Julian Weigend; Martin Halm; Tao Li Ma; Angela Lilo Sandritter; Gunter Schoß; Ina Rudolph; Axel Wandtke; Alissa Jung; Stephen Dürr; Fred Delmare; Joachim Kretzer; Holger Daemgen; Johannes Steck; Matthias Koeberlin; Steve Windolf; Denise Zich; Maren Gilzer; Uta Schorn; Jutta Kammann; Roy Peter Link; Cheryl Shepard; Sarah Tkotsch; Anita Vulesica; Isabel Varell; Anja Nejarri; Isabell Gerschke
- Theme music composer: Kisha
- Opening theme: Love is Enough
- Country of origin: Germany
- Original language: German
- No. of seasons: 28
- No. of episodes: 1109

Production
- Executive producer: Jana Brandt
- Running time: 45 min

Original release
- Network: Das Erste
- Release: 26 October 1998 – present

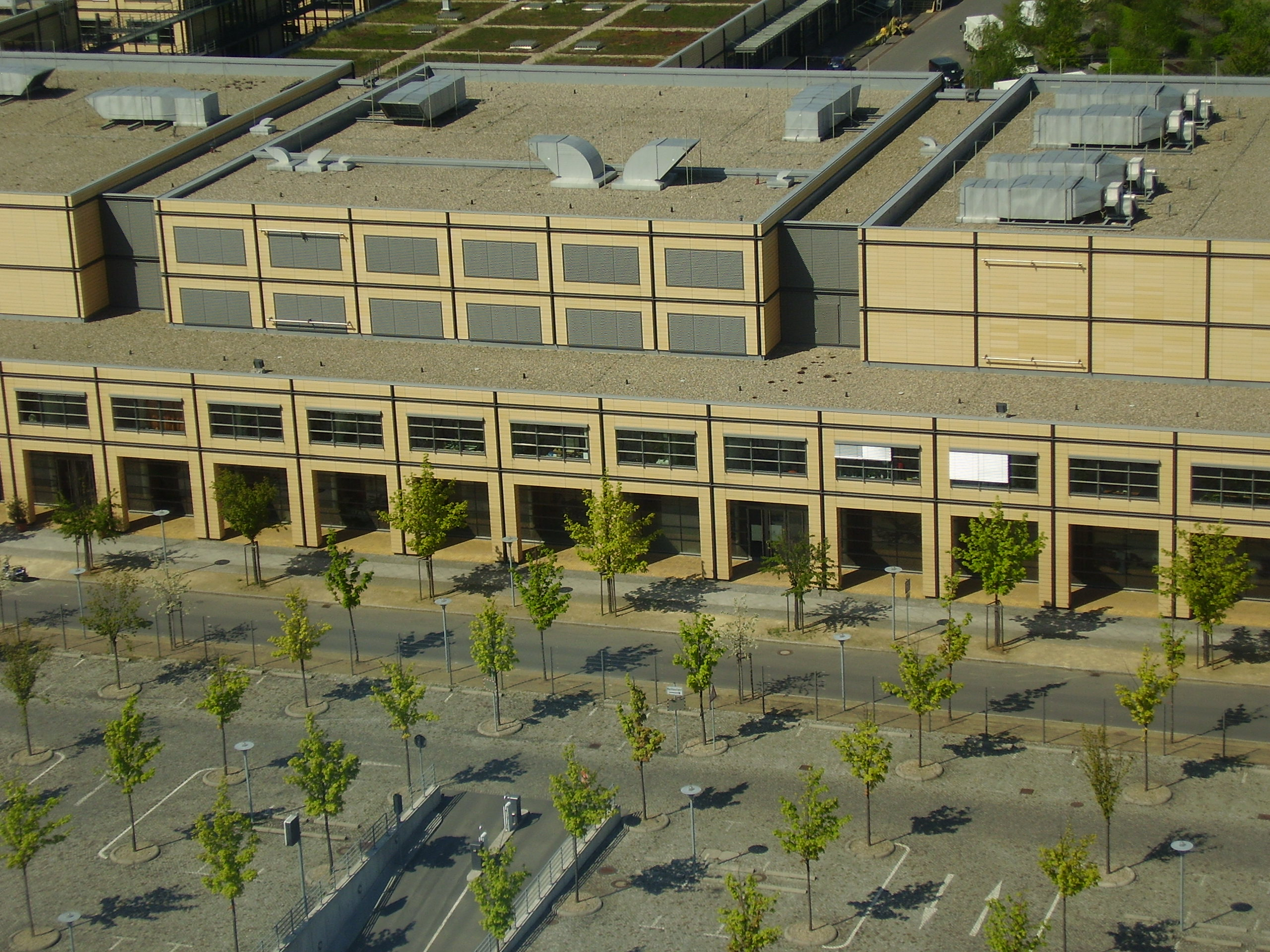
Building complex in the Media City Leipzig with the hospital building.

In aller Freundschaft (In all friendship) is a German television soap opera that began airing in 1998 every Tuesday. The series follows the staff of the fictional Sachsenklinik hospital in the city of Leipzig.

The series is produced by Degeto (a subsidiary of the German TV channel ARD) and by Saxonia Media Filmproduktion GmbH in the studios of Media City Leipzig.

The first broadcast was on 26 October 1998. Since then, approximately 600 episodes have aired.

Initially, the focus was on three main characters, Dr. Roland Heilmann, Dr. Achim Kreutzer, and Dr. Maia Dietz, and their friendship. Nowadays, there is a growing cast of 15–20 characters which the plot follows (of the original trio, only Dr. Roland Heilmann can still be seen in the program).

Many actors were already acting in the television and cinema industry in the German Democratic Republic. Other locally renowned directors from the former GDR who have contributed to the program include Celino Bleiweiß, Klaus Gendries, and Peter Hill.

Even though the series is set in the city of Leipzig (Saxony), which is home to the Upper Saxon German dialect, the dialect is rarely used in the series in order to make it easier for the rest of the German population to understand.

== Current cast ==
As of 2016, the cast consists of the following actors:

- Arzu Bazman as Arzu Ritter
- Rolf Becker as Otto Stein
- Bernhard Bettermann as Dr. Martin Stein
- Ursula Karusseit as Charlotte Gauss
- Thomas Koch as Dr. Philipp Brentano
- Karsten Kühn as Jakob Heilmann
- Andrea Kathrin Loewig as Dr. Kathrin Globisch
- Anja Nejarri as Dr. Lea Peters
- Anthony Petrifke as Jonas Heilmann
- Thomas Rühmann as Dr. Roland Heilmann
- Jascha Rust as Christopher "Kris" Haas
- Udo Schenk as Dr. Rolf Kaminski
- Johann Lukas Sickert as Bastian Marquardt
- Alexa Maria Surholt as Sarah Marquardt
- Michael Trischan as Hans-Peter Brenner
- Anita Vulesica as Ulrike Stolze
- Henriette Zimmeck as Marie Stein
- Ella Zirzow as Lisa Schroth

== Spin-off: In aller Freundschaft – Die jungen Ärzte ==
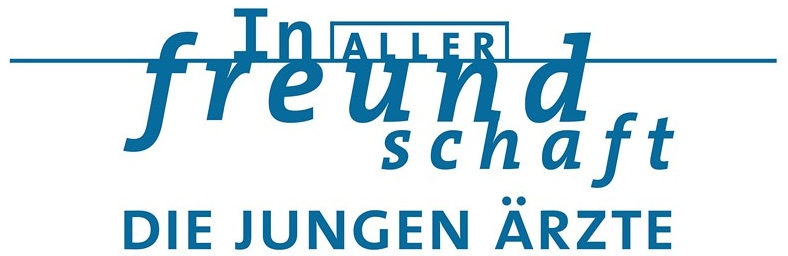

In July 2014, the MDR announced the production of a spin-off named In aller Freundschaft – Die jungen Ärzte - (In All Friendship - The Young Doctors). The series focuses on Dr. Niklas Ahrend (Roy Peter Link), who at the beginning of the series accepts a senior physician's office at the Johannes-Thal-Klinikum in Erfurt, leaving the Sachsenklinik and five assistants. The production of 42 episodes began in autumn 2014; the weekly broadcast on Thursday evenings began on 22 January 2015 at Das Erste.

== Spin-off: In aller Freundschaft – Die Krankenschwestern ==
In November 2018, a new spin-off began, named In aller Freundschaft – Die Krankenschwestern. The characters are introduced in both older series. In In aller Freundschaft, nurse Arzu meets a former classmate from nursing school who asks her to come to Halle and help her with the formation of the new nurses. In Die jungen Ärzte, two of the main characters, Luisa and Jasmine, who have applied to the nursing school, have a car accident in Erfurt (where the young doctors show happens) and meet Fliete Petersen, the cousin of Elias Bähr, who works at the Johannes-Thal-Klinikum as an assistant. Fliete realises that he wants to train as a nurse too and follows his two new friends in Halle.
