= Isabel Varell =

German singer and actress

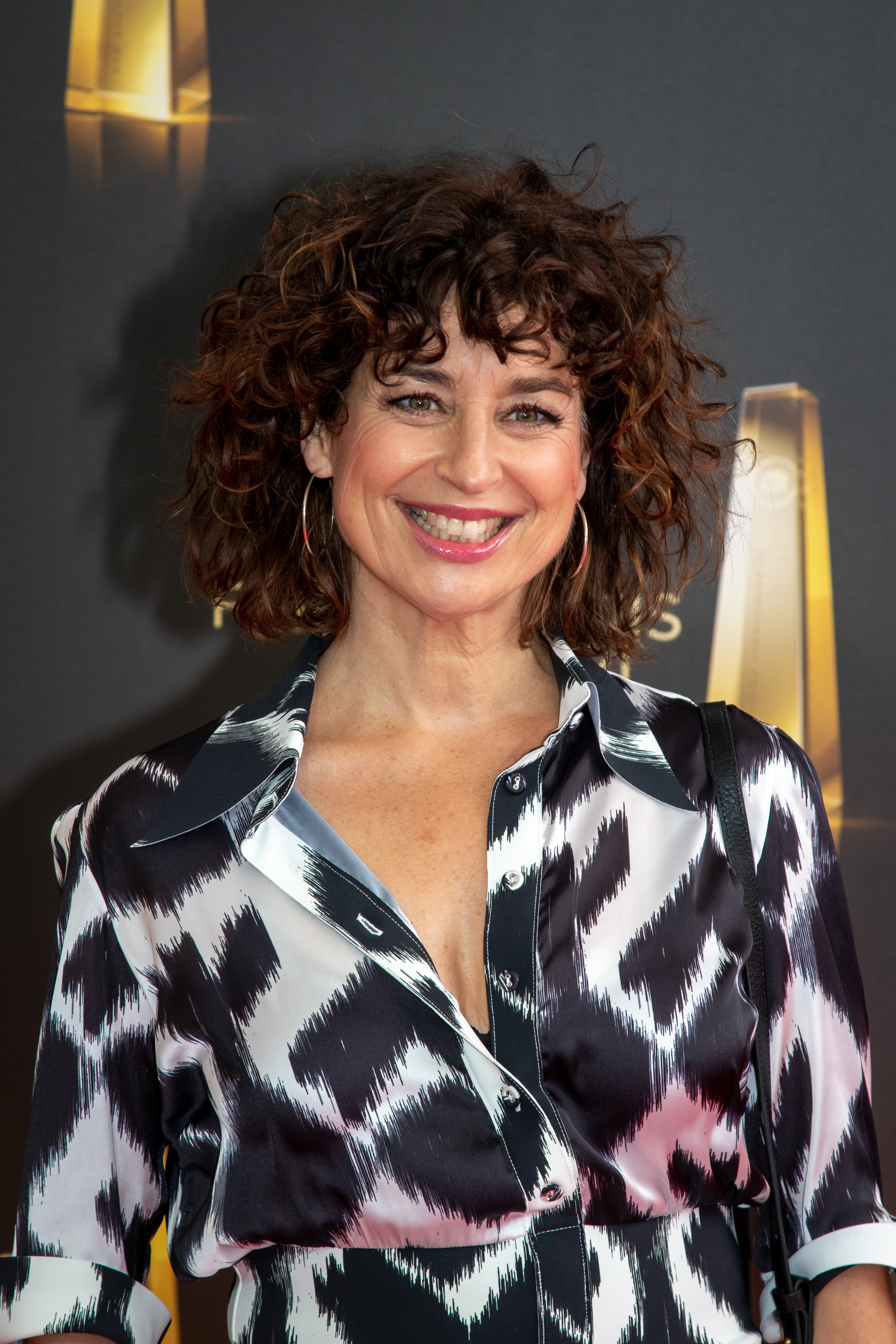
Varell in 2021

Isabel Varell (née Wehrmann; born 31 July 1961) is a German singer, actress and television presenter.

== Life ==
Born in Kempen, Varell participated in various talent shows as a singer before she was discovered and supported by German producer Jack White in 1981. She released several singles in German and English language from 1981 on. From 1989 to 1991, she was married to German singer Drafi Deutscher. He also wrote her single Melodie d'amour with which she participated in the German preselection for the Eurovision Song Contest 1990 and finished sixth. Varell played in various musicals (e.g. Hammerfrauen from 2015 on in Berlin) and comedy TV shows, most notably alongside Hape Kerkeling. She has also presented TV shows for different broadcasters (Aktuelle Schaubude for NDR in 1997; Ganz in weiß for Sat.1 in 2016). From 2009 on she has written almost all the lyrics for her own albums as well as some for other artists such as Claudia Jung (Mein Plan für's nächste Leben, 2012).

Since 2008, Varell has lived together with television director Pit Weyrich whom she married in 2015. Her autobiographic book Mittlere Reife was published in April 2016.

== Discography ==
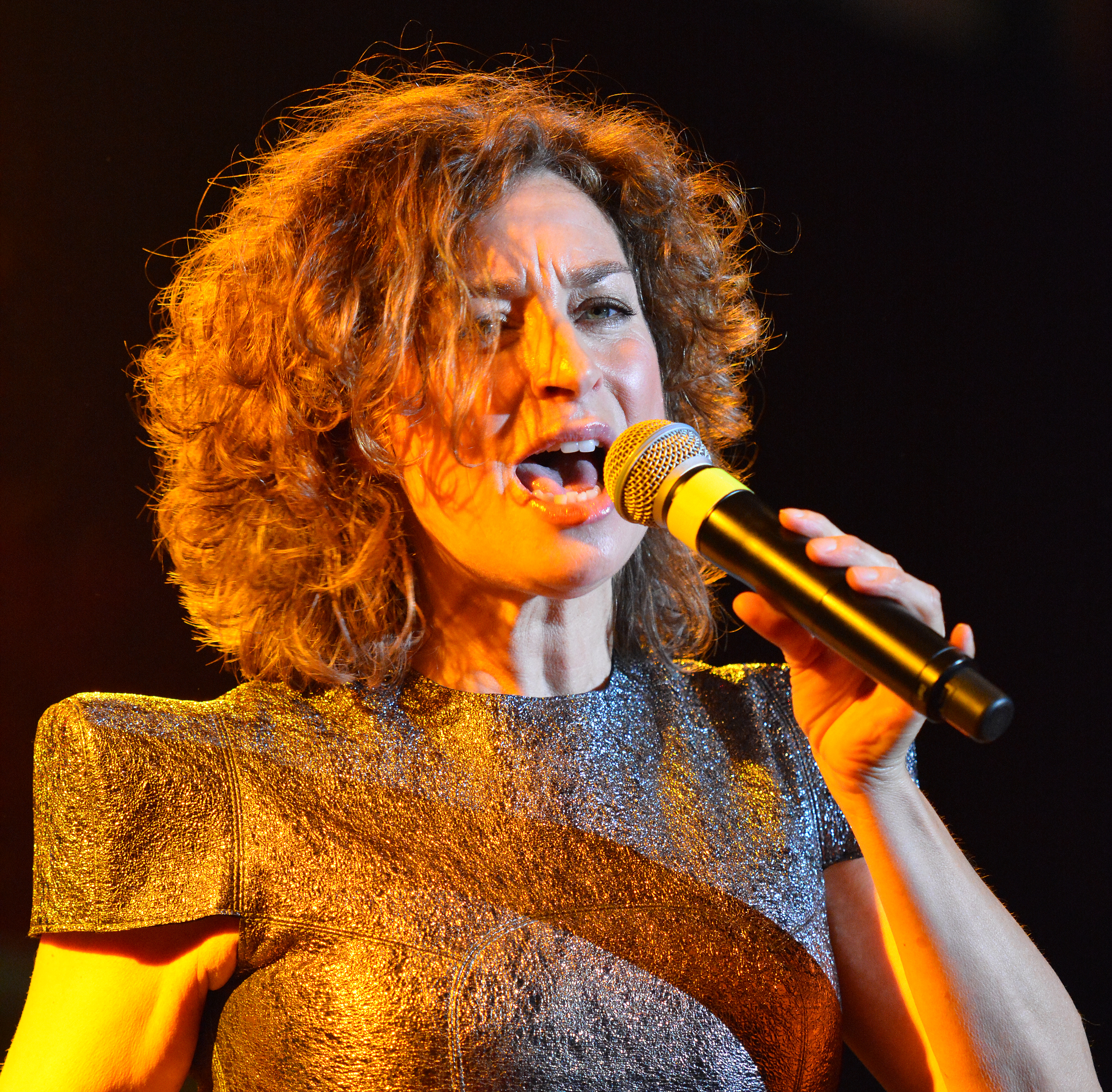
Varell performing in 2014

- 1983: Baby Rock'n'Roll (LP)
- 1999: Nur nicht aus Liebe weinen (CD)
- 2002: Heut ist mein Tag (CD)
- 2008: Königin der Nacht (CD)
- 2009: Alles Ansichtssache (CD)
- 2011: Alles neu (CD)
- 2013: Da geht noch was (CD)

Singles (selection)

- 1984: Verträumt
- 1985: Die Sonne geht auf
- 1986: Tonight
- 1987: Golden Boy
- 1988: The Spirit of the Heart
- 1989: Indestructible Love
- 1990: Melodie d'amour (written by Drafi Deutscher)
- 1990: Geh nicht vorbei
- 1991: There was a time (written by Jackie DeShannon)
- 1993: Frauen, die lieben
- 1994: Es gibt ein Danach
- 1999: Kann denn Liebe Sünde sein? (with Hape Kerkeling)
- 2002: Ich frier ohne dein Licht (co-written by Thomas Anders)
- 2007: Bye Bye Baby
- 2009: Nachts
- 2011: Es ist nicht leicht Prinzessin zu sein (written by Stefan Zauner)
- 2013: Da geht noch was
- 2015: Ich habe Zeit (written by Stefan Zauner)
- 2015: Verliebt ins Leben

== Filmography ==
- 1985: Das Rätsel der Sandbank, as Clara Dollmann
- 2004: Ich bin ein Star – Holt mich hier raus!
- 2009–2010: Rote Rosen, as Andrea Weller
- 2010–2011: Lena – Liebe meines Lebens, as Linda Behrendt
- 2012: Rosamunde Pilcher – Der Fluch der weißen Tauben

== Literature ==
- 2016: Mittlere Reife, Piper Verlag
