= John Becht =

American cyclist

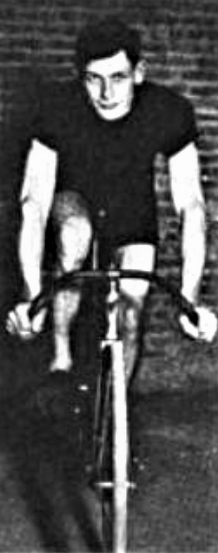

Personal information
- Born: October 13, 1886 Brooklyn, New York, United States
- Died: November 7, 1960 (aged 74) New Milford, New Jersey, United States

Cycling career
- Sport: Cycling

John Becht (October 13, 1886 – November 7, 1960) was an American cyclist. He competed in two events at the 1912 Summer Olympics.

He died at his home in New Milford, New Jersey on November 7, 1960.
