= Balko =

German television series

Balko is a German prime time television series broadcast on the private TV channel RTL. It is a police detective story with comical twists featuring two inspectors of the Dortmund police, Balko (played by Jochen Horst until episode 48, then by Bruno Eyron) and his colleague Klaus Krapp (Ludger Pistor). Balko's main characteristics are his coolness and his consistently laid-back appearance, whereas Krapp is a typical mama's boy and very clumsy. The series started in 1995 and has won several television awards.

== Characters ==
Kriminalhauptkommissar Balko

Balko, the main character of the series, is an easygoing and friendly police officer not always sticking to working rules. He is a conscientious objector and holds no high school diploma. Most of the time he is surrounded by incompetent colleagues he cannot rely on in cases of emergency. Balko originally comes from Wetter, a small village in the Ennepe Ruhr district, near Dortmund. His parents still live there. So far his Christian name has not been mentioned in any episode.

Kriminalhauptkommissar Klaus Krapp

Krapp, also called "Krappi", is portrayed as a thoroughly honest public servant. He is never dressed improperly, is always up to date in his profession and is well-educated. He graduated from a German high school (Abitur) and is a reserve officer of the Bundeswehr. Despite his many skills, in the domestic area as well as many others, he has no luck with women. His attempts to score with the opposite sex have mostly been a failure. Krapp seems to cling to his mother, who is mentioned repeatedly and lives in Dortmund-Huckarde, though she never appears in person.

Kriminaloberrätin Katharina Jäger

After a series of changes in the leadership of the homicide division (during the first years the part of the chief executive was played by Dieter Pfaff as well as for a short time by Horst A. Fechner and Arthur Brauss), Kriminaloberrätin Katharina Jäger (played by Sabine Vitua) became Balko's boss from 1998 to 2000. After her death caused by assassination with a sabotaged car, which was originally directed at Balko, Wittek became the new chief detective.

Polizeikommissar/Polizeiobermeister/Erster Kriminalhauptkommissar Hans "Quittek" Wittek

Kriminalhauptkommissar Wittek, called "Quittek", was a patrolman until he is promoted to be Erster Polizeihauptkommissar and head of the homicide division of Dortmund by skipping five ranks. The reason for this is his marriage with the daughter of the Polizeipräsident. He is very simple-minded and often messes up inspections but because of his lack of competence he also always gives his investigators plenty of leeway.

Polizeiobermeister Marek

Polizeiobermeister Marek is the ultimate simple-minded patrolman, assigned to the Dortmund homicide division. His first name has never been mentioned in any episode.

Polizeiobermeister Schafranek

Polizeiobermeister Schafranek is a clumsy, not particularly clever, but very likable patrolman who was assigned to the homicide division after Wittek's promotion. His first name also remains unknown. Schafranek is Marek's best friend.

Kriminalrat Holtmann

When Wittek retired, Kriminalrat Holtmann became his successor and was appointed chief of the homicide division for the last seven episodes. He was clearly stricter than his predecessor, kept a tighter rein and appeared to be a very competent detective.
