= Günther Jauch =

German television host (born 1956)

- Jauch in 2025
- Born: Günther Johannes Jauch; 13 July 1956 (age 70); Münster, West Germany
- Occupations: Television presenter, television producer, journalist
- Height: 1.93 m (6 ft 4 in)
- Spouse: Dorothea "Thea" Jauch

Signature
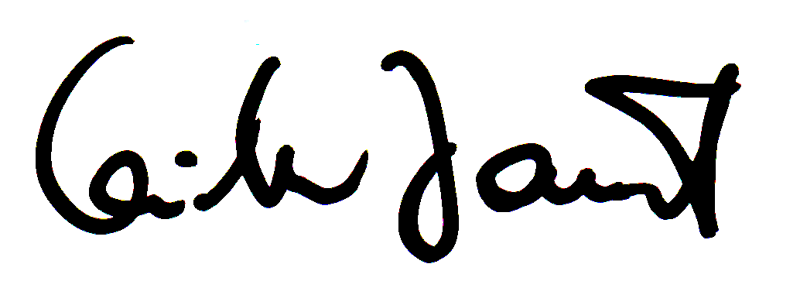

Günther Johannes Jauch (German pronunciation: [ˈɡʏntɐ joˈhanəs ˈjaʊx]; born 13 July 1956) is a German television presenter, television producer, and journalist, best known as the longtime host of Wer wird Millionär?, the German version of Who Wants to Be a Millionaire?.

== Career ==
Jauch started his career working on radio programs of Bayerischer Rundfunk. Jauch has produced and hosted the prime time TV programme stern TV, a television news magazine programme, on the private German RTL national TV network since 1990. The programme caused some controversy due to the transmission of falsified articles delivered by the journalist Michael Born, who was subsequently convicted to a four-year prison sentence in 1996. A few other prominent German TV networks had also been deceived with such material.

In 1999, Jauch hosted Millionär Gesucht! Die SKL-Show, a lottery game show broadcast on RTL and sponsored by the Süddeutsche Klassenlotterie. The show was a success, running until 2002; its successor, Die 5-Millionen-SKL-Show, which Jauch also presented, ran until 2010.

On 3 September 1999, Jauch premiered Wer wird Millionär?, a German version of Who Wants to Be a Millionaire?, on RTL. Despite opening to disappointing ratings, the show quickly became a word-of-mouth hit, and has run continuously ever since. Jauch is known for his witty style of entertainment that he developed on Wer wird Millionär? and has won several awards for his appearances on the show.

From 2000 until 2006, Jauch hosted the broadcast of the Four Hills Tournament in ski jumping from Oberstdorf. Since 2008, he has been a panel member on the annual quiz show 20xx - Das Quiz on ARD, produced by his production company i&u TV.

In January 2011, after celebrating the end of his 21-year reign hosting stern TV, Jauch moved to Das Erste to host an eponymous weekly political talk show. He remained with RTL to host Wer wird Millionär?.

Jauch also owns the production company "i&u TV", which stands for Information und Unterhaltung ("information and entertainment"). He is known to make large donations to charity from money he receives from his appearances in advertisements and other promotional work, and has used his personal wealth to purchase and restore several historic buildings in and around Potsdam, his current town of residence.

Jauch, together with Thomas Gottschalk, is also part of the German TV show Die 2 – Gottschalk und Jauch gegen alle. Gottschalk has appeared three times on Wer wird Millionär?, including winning the million in 2008.

In 2015, shortly after Stefan Raab announced the end of his TV career, Jauch declared publicly that he intended to gradually reduce his TV appearances. Jauch gave up his ARD political programme to focus on his other TV shows such as Wer wird Millionär?. Jauch would eventually return to Das Erste as part of the programme Ich weiß alles!, hosted by Jörg Pilawa, which ran until 2020.

== Personal life ==
After 18 years of common-law marriage, Jauch married Thea Sihler in the Orangerie at Schloss Sanssouci in Potsdam in 2006. He is a member of the Hamburg Jauch family.

Jauch and Thea have two biological daughters, Svenja (born in 1989) and Kristin (born in 1993). The couple adopted two orphaned daughters in 1997 and 2000, named Katja and Masha.

=== Philanthropy ===
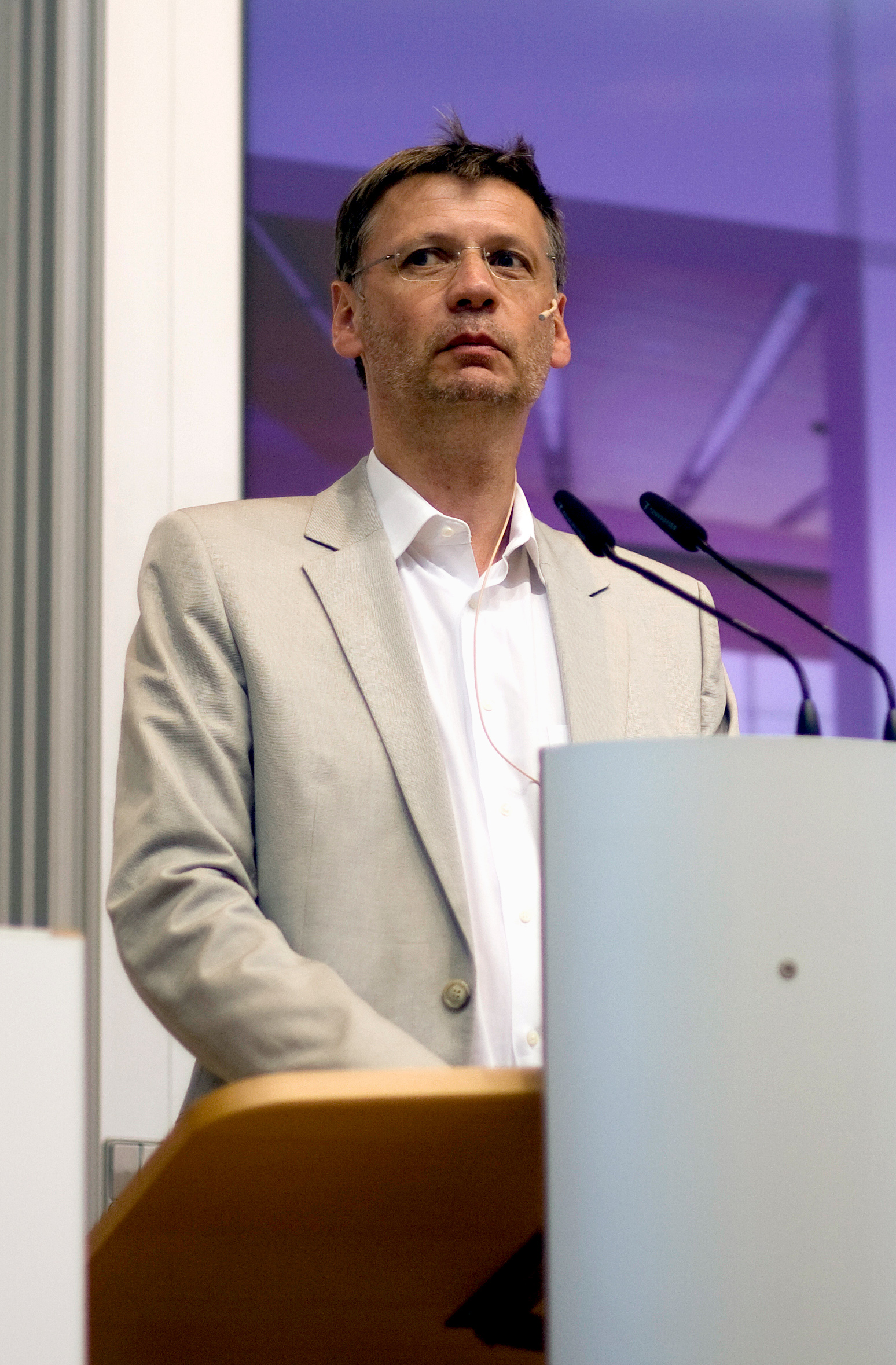
Jauch in 2008

Jauch is characterised by his secluded lifestyle. He stated in interviews that he takes the liberty of leading a life that does not correspond to his supposed economic possibilities. According to his own statement, he has spent considerable amounts of his income, including all the profit from advertising jobs, on charitable causes since the early years of his career. In 2002, he made significant financial contributions to the reconstruction of the Fortunaportal (Gate of the Fortuna) at the Potsdam Stadtschloss city palace. Jauch has also given financial support to other projects in Potsdam, e.g. the Belvedere on the Pfingstberg, (where he got married in 2006), the Potsdam city canal, the Kloebersaal, a hall in the north wing of the Marmorpalais (Marble Palace), which is opposite his villa at Heiligen See lake, as well as the restoration of the Neptungrotte (Neptune Grotto) in the palace gardens of Schloss Sanssouci. Furthermore, he supported the construction of the Marienschule Potsdam, a co-educational Roman-Catholic school for primary and secondary education, which belongs to the archdiocese of Berlin. The prime minister of Brandenburg, Matthias Platzeck, called him a citizen every mayor could ever wish for. Jauch was an ambassador for the Berlin Pro-Reli-Kampagne, a petition which aimed to change the Education Act of the state of Berlin in order to introduce religious studies as an elective subject instead of ethics as a sole compulsory subject. The campaign eventually failed in April 2009.

Jauch's ancestress on his grandmother's side, Anna Weißebach, founded the Caritas Konferenzen, the German branch of the Caritas Internationalis international charity association. Jauch's own family set up soup kitchens in Hamburg as early as the 19th and 20th century and founded and maintained poorhouses in Hamburg and other places. In line with his family's tradition of charitable foundations, Jauch endowed the founding of a branch of Die Arche, a Christian organisation for children and adolescents, in Drewitz, Potsdam in 2009, providing free meals for children in need. He also covers some of the charity's ongoing property and personnel expenses.

=== Vineyard owner ===
Jauch also continues a 200-year-old family tradition of wine-growing. In 2010, he successfully applied for membership in the German Prädikat Wine Estates VDP (German: "Verband Deutscher Prädikatsweingüter"), in order to acquire a relative's vineyard (Othegraven in Kanzem) which was approved by VDP that certifies Germany's wines that meet the organizations requirements. The entire property, including a mansion and an English Garden, has been subject to preservation orders since 2003.

Jauch's family has been running the winery since 1805, when his ancestor and merchant Emmerich Grach bought the property. Jauch's grandmother Elsa von Othegraven, his grandfather Hans Jauch and his father Ernst-Alfred Jauch were part of the community of heirs. However, in 1996 the winery was inherited by a distant relative.

In order to ensure that the winery was not going to be sold to a party outside the family, Jauch decided to buy it. One of the previous owners had been Jauch's famous great-great-uncle, Franz Weißebach. According to the VDP, the vineyard is a gem of a vineyard, rare in its quality and attractive location. In 2011, Jauch acquired a further vineyard (Wawerner Herrenberg) in Wawern that is 3.5 acres. It had also belonged to his ancestor Emmerich Grach. Jauch also co-produced wines that supermarket chain Aldi has been selling under his name since 2018.

=== Privacy dispute ===
Jauch wanted to legally prohibit any type of media coverage in the preparation of his wedding in July 2006. The Landgericht Berlin granted him an interim injunction against the newspaper Bild and other publications of the Springer publishing house. The Kammergericht Berlin, however, decided against a prohibition of general media coverage in June 2006 due to his celebrity status. According to the judges, they were allowed to report about the date and place of the wedding. After the magazine Bunte published photos of the wedding and details about the ceremony, Thea Jauch went to court against the publishing house to demand damages and compensation for pain and suffering totalling €325,000. The Landgericht Hamburg awarded her €25,000 in compensation in January 2008. The judgment was set aside by the Hanseatisches Oberlandesgericht in October 2008. As a public figure, interest in Jauch's wedding was legitimate, it said. A fresh appeal was refused by the Federal Constitutional Court. A separate lawsuit for damages by Jauch was also dimsissed.

The couple then went before the European Court of Human Rights to claim that the German justice system did not protect Jauch's right to privacy sufficiently and breached his right to protection of property, because they did not award him damages for the published photos. The court in Strasbourg affirmed the public's interest in his wedding and therefore, their claims were without cause. German justice had carefully weighed between the right to privacy and the freedom of the press, it said. The complaint was declared inadmissible.

== Shows hosted ==
- 1985–1987: Live aus dem Alabama
- 1988–1997: Das aktuelle sportstudio (Up-to-date Sport news)
- since 1989: Menschen, Bilder, Emotionen (People, Pictures, Emotions)
- 1990–2010: Stern TV
- since 1999: Wer wird Millionär? (German version of Who Wants to Be a Millionaire?)
- 2000–2006: RTL-Skispringen (ski jumping)
- 2001–2004: Der Große IQ-Test (The Big IQ Test)
- 2001–2009: 5-Millionen SKL Show
- 2002–2004: Grips-Show (Brain Show)
- since 2009: 5 gegen Jauch (5 against Jauch)
- 2011–2015: Günther Jauch (Sunday evening political talkshow on Das Erste)
- 2013–2017: Die 2 – Gottschalk & Jauch gegen alle (with Thomas Gottschalk and Barbara Schöneberger)
- 2016–2017: 500 – Die Quiz-Arena
- 2018-2025: Denn sie wissen nicht, was passiert – Die Jauch-Gottschalk-Schöneberger-Show (with Thomas Gottschalk and Barbara Schöneberger)
- since 2019: Bin ich schlauer als Günther Jauch? (Am I smarter than Günther Jauch?)

== Awards ==
- 1988
  - Goldene Kamera
- 1989
  - Bayerischer Fernsehpreis
- 1990
  - Bambi
- 1998
  - Bayerischer Fernsehpreis together with Marcel Reif
- 2001
  - Goldene Kamera
  - Bayerischer Fernsehpreis:
  - Bambi for Wer wird Millionär?
- 2002
  - Adolf-Grimme-Preis
- 2003
  - Unsere Besten, Rank 29
  - Osgar
  - Bambi:
- 2006
  - Deutscher Fernsehpreis
- 2010
  - Deutscher Fernsehpreis
- 2011
  - Goldene Kamera
  - red dot design award
- 2012
  - Goldene Kamera

== Products advertised ==
- Krombacher (beer)
- KarstadtQuelle (a department store / mail-order company)
- Süddeutsche Klassenlotterie (a lottery)
- DHL (a postal service owned by Germany's Deutsche Post alongside Thomas Gottschalk)
- World Wide Fund for Nature (a nature preserve organization)

== References in popular culture ==
- Jauch is mentioned in the song Rot by Markus Henrik, in his role as the host of the show Wer wird Millionär? (Who Wants to Be a Millionaire?).
- Jauch is also mentioned in the Blumentopf song "Warum eigentlich nicht?"
- Jauch is also mentioned in the song "Otto Normal" by Paula Carolina as someone an average couple listens to in the evenings.

== See also ==
- List of celebrities who own wineries and vineyards
