= Katharina Schubert =

German television actress (born 1963)

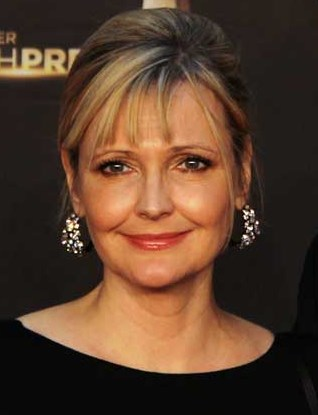
- Schubert in 2012
- Born: Katharina Schubert; November 26, 1963 (age 61); Wiesbaden, Germany
- Website: https://web.archive.org/web/20120424093710/http://www.agentur-reuter.com/?page_id=200

Katharina Schubert (born November 26, 1963) is a German television actress. She was born in Wiesbaden.
