= Hape Kerkeling =

German comedian (born 1964)

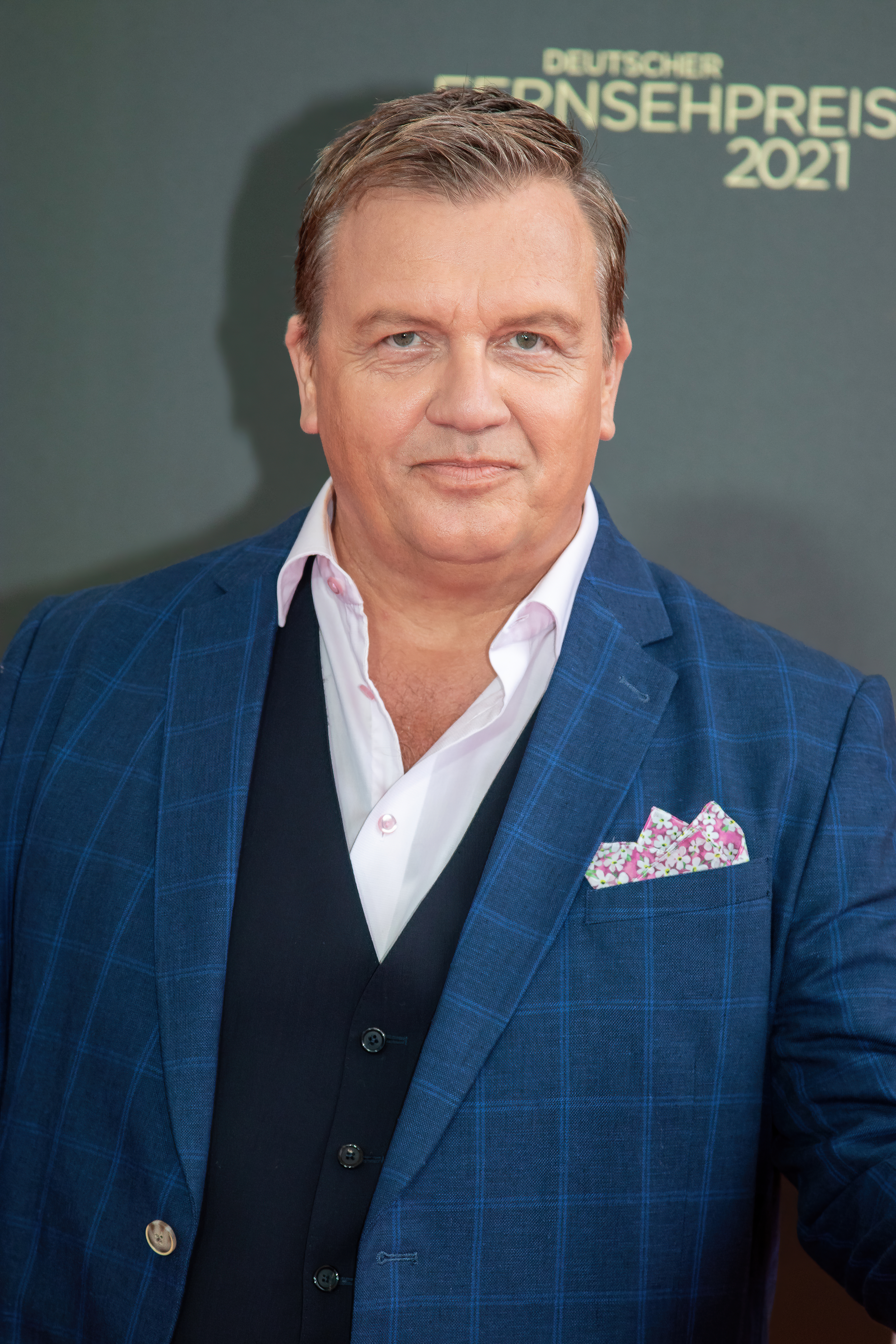
- Kerkeling in 2021
- Born: Hans Peter Wilhelm Kerkeling; 9 December 1964 (age 61); Recklinghausen, West Germany
- Occupations: Comedian, author, presenter, actor, singer
- Years active: 1984–present
- Website: hapekerkeling.de

Hans Peter Wilhelm "Hape" Kerkeling (German pronunciation: [ˈhaːpə ˈkɛʁkəlɪŋ]; born 9 December 1964) is a German comedian, TV presenter, author, and actor.

== Career ==
At secondary school in Recklinghausen, Hape Kerkeling and some fellow students formed a band (Gesundfutter, meaning: health food) and published a record (Hawaii).

Kerkeling started his career as a comedian in radio, working for various German broadcasting companies, such as WDR and BR.

His breakthrough came in 1984/85 when, still aged only 19, he got a role in the Känguru [sic] television comedy show (the German word for kangaroo deliberately spelt without an "h" at the end although this broke the spelling rules at that time). The best-known character in this show was the little boy Hannilein, played by Kerkeling, an irritating child with red hair in a pudding-basin style, dungarees and sitting on giant-sized chairs, who commented on the world of adults.

Later came guest appearances and sketches on the Radio Bremen show Extratour. Then in 1989, Kerkeling started up his own comedy TV show, Total Normal (Totally Normal), along with pianist Achim Hagemann. This show, a satirical spoof on prime-time TV shows, had a totally new format and was awarded several television prizes such as the Goldene Kamera, the Adolf-Grimme-Preis and the Bayerischer Fernsehpreis. On the show, Kerkeling made television history on 25 April 1991 when he dressed up as Queen Beatrix of the Netherlands on a state visit to Berlin and almost managed to get into Schloss Bellevue to meet the President of Germany for lunch. The satirical song from this show, Das ganze Leben ist ein Quiz (All life is a quiz), made it into the German pop charts.

In 1992, Kerkeling's first film came out: Kein Pardon, which he directed and starred in, as well as helping to write the script.

In 1992, Kerkeling turned down an offer by the big public broadcasting company ZDF to work on the popular prime-time show Wetten, dass..? and instead, without his previous partner Hagemann, moved to the independent television sector with the show Cheese. This was similar in concept to Total Normal and viewing figures were relatively high; still this is considered as his first flop.

In the second half of the 1990s, Kerkeling worked once more for ARD, presenting the show Warmumsherz (Heartwarming), and filmed several television films (Club Las Piranjas (1995), Willi und die Windzors, 1996; Die Oma ist tot, 1997).

In 1999, Kerkeling returned to success with his Sat.1 show Darüber lacht die Welt (What makes the world laugh). He also presented the yearly fundraising gala for the German AIDS fund Deutsche AIDS-Hilfe. In 2003, he was awarded the Deutscher Fernsehpreis (German Television Prize) in the category Best Entertainment Presenter.

In January 2004, Kerkeling made another film titled Samba in Mettmann, which is set in Mettmann in North Rhine Westphalia. In May 2004, and a year later in May 2005, he presented the Großer Deutsch-Test (a national test show for German grammar and spelling) and in October 2004 the Großer Deutschlandtest (a test about people's knowledge of Germany). In April and May 2006, he presented the live TV show Let's Dance, the German version of Strictly Come Dancing/Dancing with the Stars, with Nazan Eckes.

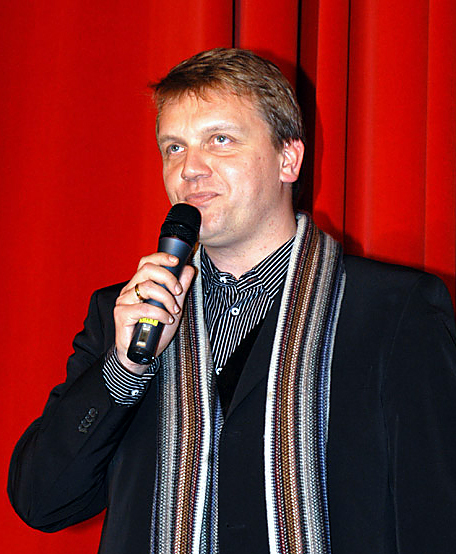
Kerkeling in 2004

German broadcaster ZDF started the production of Kerkeling's Ein Mann, ein Fjord! (A Man, A Fjord!) in May 2008, directed by Angelo Colagrossi and written by Kerkeling, Angelo Colagrossi and Angelina Maccarone. Starring Jürgen Tarrach, Anneke Kim Sarnau, Matthias Brandt and Horst Krause the film portrays Kerkeling as Horst Schlämmer, Uschi Blum and Gisela. The movie premiered on 21 January 2009, on ZDF.

In a survey by the television station Kabel 1 in 2005, Kerkeling made it into the top ten favourite faces on German television; the only other two presenters were Günther Jauch and Thomas Gottschalk.

In 2001, Kerkeling went on a pilgrimage, following the Way of St James for 650 kilometres (400 mi) to Santiago de Compostela. In June 2006, his book Ich bin dann mal weg (I'm off for a bit, then), his diary of this pilgrimage, was top of the Spiegel magazine non-fiction bestseller list. By May 2008, it had sold three million copies. It appeared in English in 2009 with the title I'm Off Then: Losing and Finding Myself on the Camino De Santiago. It has also been translated into French, Italian, Dutch, Polish, Latvian, Spanish, and Chinese.

Since early 2005, Kerkeling has presented the show Hape trifft! (which is ambiguous in the German language and may be translated as Hape hits the spot! or Hape meets!) show, produced by Günther Jauch's production team i&u TV on RTL.

In 2013, Kerkeling spoke and sang the German version of Olaf, a snowman from the new Disney movie Frozen.

A film about his childhood was released in 2018, titled All About Me, based on his semi-autographic book, with the main character played by Julius Weckauf. The film biography by Oscar-winning director Caroline Link was well-received by film critics and the most successful German film of 2018 in German cinemas, selling over 3.8 million tickets.

In 2024, an article in Süddeutsche Zeitung described his efforts to research his ancestry, which led to the suggestion that he is a possible descendant of Edward VII of England.

The movie Extrawurst, which has been showing in German cinemas since January 2026, stars Kerkeling in one of the leading roles. The movie Horst Schlämmer sucht das Glück (Horst Schlämmer Seeks Happiness) is scheduled for release in March 2026.

== Personal life ==
On 10 December 1991, in a German television talkshow, filmmaker Rosa von Praunheim revealed that Kerkeling, among others, was gay. Kerkeling's comment on the ensuing fuss (mostly in the gutter press) was that while anyone of a more sensitive nature than him would probably have climbed into the bath with a hairdryer, he could not see the point: they would be dragging another poor soul through the dirt the next day anyway.

Kerkeling lived with his partner and co-author Angelo Colagrossi in Berlin. Colagrossi wrote a large number of texts and sketches for Total Normal and other shows, and co-directed the films Kein Pardon, Willi und die Windzors, Die Oma ist tot, Samba in Mettmann and Ein Mann, ein Fjord!.

In March 2011, Kerkeling announced that he and Colagrossi were getting a divorce.

== Characters ==
=== Horst Schlämmer ===
Horst Schlämmer is one of Kerkeling's current characters (and the most successful), the deputy editor of the fictitious newspaper Grevenbroicher Tagblatt. His motto is to "get up close and ask tough questions". Dressed in a grey trenchcoat and with a small black manbag on his arm, he holds interviews at real events such as the Bundestag elections.

Schlämmer speaks to interviewees in an overfamiliar manner, using du for you rather than the polite Sie, and addressing them as Schätzelein (sweetheart). He seems to think he is a sex symbol, attempting to kiss female interviewees despite his loose false teeth. To impress women, he boasts that he earns three thousand (euro) net a month.

On the ARD's Harald Schmidt show, Kerkeling explained his methods. Before a Schlämmer interview, he said, he pours a few drops of strong liquor over his coat, to give the interviewee the impression he or she is being interviewed by a real reporter, but with an alcohol problem, prompting a real response.

The single Schätzelein came out at the start of 2006, including the songs Schätzelein and Meine letzte Zigarette (My last cigarette).

In May 2006 Schlämmer appeared on Wer wird Millionär (the German Who Wants to Be a Millionaire?) as a celebrity candidate, and became the first person to persuade Günther Jauch, the presenter of Wer wird Millionär, into the contestant's seat. The two made 500,000 euro for a good cause (German AIDS Foundation).

In 2007 a computer game "Weisse Bescheid?!", based on Horst Schlämmer, was released.

In 2009 Kerkeling announced a mockumentary about Horst Schlämmer running for German Chancellor. It was scheduled to be released to cinemas in Germany shortly before the German federal election of 2009. According to a BBC piece, Horst Schlämmer would receive 18% of the German vote due partly to his Obama inspired slogan, "Yes weekend".

=== Hannilein ===
Kerkeling, in Kerkelings Kinderstunde (Kerkelings children's hour), as a cheeky child of preschool age named Hannilein, with red tousled hair and a bib overall, sits on oversized chairs and comments on the adult world.

=== Evje van Dampen ===
Is a female Dutch relationship counselor who meets various German celebrities (such as Günther Jauch or Udo Jürgens).

=== Siggi Schwäbli ===
Siegfried (Siggi) Schwäbli is a character who first appeared in 1990 in some episodes of Total Normal. Slow-witted, short-sighted and with glasses made of plastic blocks, Siggi constantly puts his foot in it and often has no idea what is going on. At the Cannstatter Volksfest festival in Stuttgart, for example, he went on the ghost train with Barbara Schöneberger, a TV host, and almost passed out with fear.

=== Gisela ===
Gisela has recently been discovered by Horst Schlaemmer to act in commercials for Krueger Coffee. She has been happily married to her husband, Wolfgang since 1983.

=== Uschi Blum ===
Kerkeling performs as a parody of an overweight, aging German Schlager music singer with streaky success and ridiculous lyrics in her songs.

== Awards ==
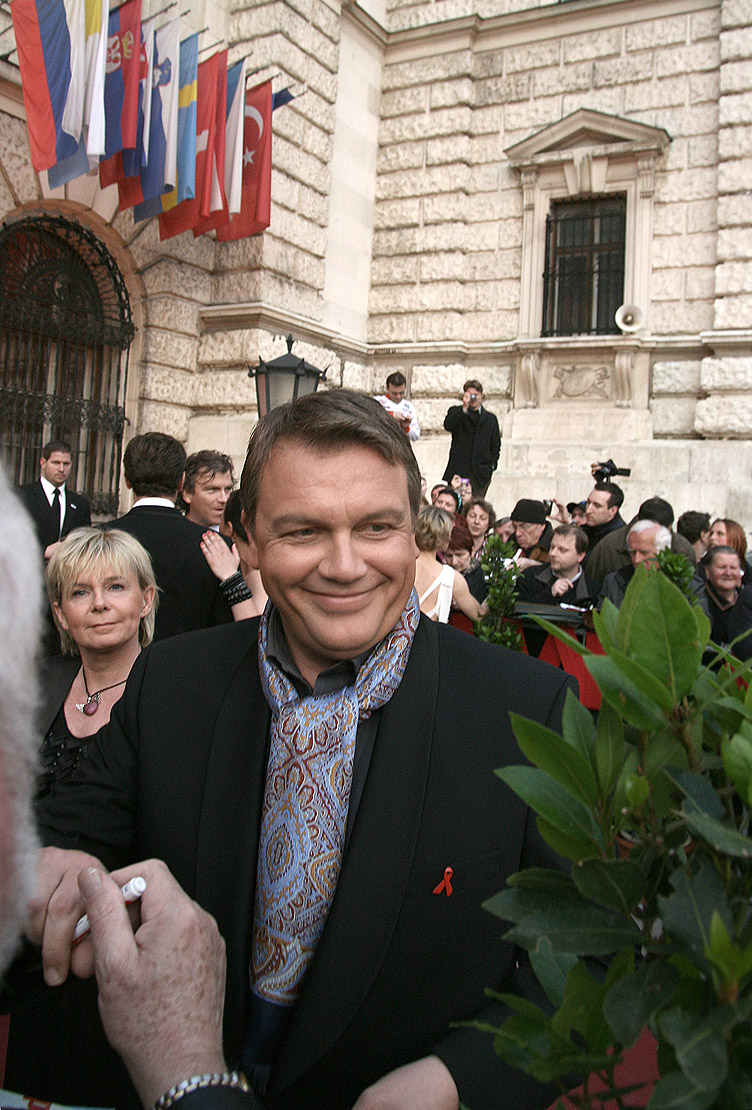
Kerkeling at the 2011 Romy Awards

1983

- Scharfrichterbeil

1991

- Adolf-Grimme-Preis in silver for Total Normal
- Bambi
- Bayerischer Fernsehpreis for Total Normal
- Goldene Europa
- Goldene Kamera for Total Normal
- Goldener Gong of the TV program magazine Gong
- Bronze Rose of Montreux for Total Normal
- Telestar

2002

- Peter-Frankenfeld-Preis

2003

- Deutscher Fernsehpreis (as a host) for Die 70er Show

2004

- Bayerischer Fernsehpreis for presenting Die 70er Show
- Deutscher Comedypreis as best presenter, for Die 70er Show

2005

- Deutscher Comedypreis "Best Comedian"
- Goldene Kamera "Best TV Entertainer"

2006

- Deutscher Comedypreis best comedian and special award for Horst Schlämmer
- Deutscher Fernsehpreis in the category best entertainment broadcasting/best presentation for his participation in Wer wird Millionär (Who Wants to Be a Millionaire?) celebrity special WM 2006 (RTL)
- 1Live Krone from the 1LIVE radio network by (WDR) best comedian
- Horst Schlämmer given an award by the independent MediumMagazin as "honorary entertainment journalist of the year"
- Bestseller Author of the Year for 1.1 million copies sold of his travelogue Ich bin dann mal weg
- Honorary member of the Verein Deutsche Sprache (German Language Association)

2007

- Adolf-Grimme-Preis Special Honor of the Association of German Adult Education Centres
- Verdienstorden des Landes Nordrhein-Westfalen Order of Merit from North Rhine-Westphalia
- Osgar in the category "Charity"

2015

- Goldene Kamera Jubilee Award

2018

- Bayerischer Fernsehpreis (Bavarian TV Award), Bavarian Minister-President's award

== Works ==
- Grosse, Dietmar; Kerkeling, Hape; Waller, Klaus (1993). Hape Kerkeling – Cheese (in German) (62. ed.). Munich: Droemer Knaur. ISBN 978-3-426-26695-3.
- Kerkeling, Hape (2008). Ich bin dann mal weg. Meine Reise auf dem Jakobsweg (in German). Munich: Malik. ISBN 978-3-89029-312-7.
  - I'm Off Then: Losing and Finding Myself on the Camino De Santiago. New York: Free Press. 2009. ISBN 978-1-4165-5387-8.
- Kerkeling, Hape (2024). Gebt mir etwas Zeit. Meine Chronik der Ereignisse [Give Me Some Time. My chronicle of events] (in German). Munich: Piper. ISBN 978-3-492-05800-1.
