= Alexander Becht =

German actor

- Born: 8 January 1986 (age 39); Marburg, West Germany
- Occupation: Actor
- Years active: 2007–2010

Alexander Becht (born 8 January 1986, in Marburg) is a German actor, mostly known for his role as Lenny Cöster in the popular soap opera Gute Zeiten, schlechte Zeiten.

Becht was born in Marburg. After he finished high school, Alexander Becht passed a professional acting education. He had his debut in a remake of the war movie Die Brücke in the role of Ernst Stolten.

In the summer of 2007, he was cast in the role of Lenny Cöster in Gute Zeiten, schlechte Zeiten. The character, which was originally introduced as a smart and emotional young adult, was the last member of the Cöster family to appear on-screen. Becht began filming in October 2007 and had his first on-screen appearance on 28 December 2007. The role got positive reactions from fans and tackles controversial issues, including abuse, violence and homosexuality, along the way.

The actor lives in Potsdam, where GZSZ is also filmed and is said to be friends with co-stars Jörn Schlönvoigt, Sarah Tkotsch, Anne Menden and Felix Isenbügel.

== Filmography ==
- 2008: The Bridge - Ernst Stolten
- 2007-2010: Gute Zeiten, schlechte Zeiten – Lenny Cöster
