= András Fricsay =

German actor and filmmaker (1942–2024)

András Fricsay (born András Fricsay Kali Son; 2 April 1942 – 19 November 2024) was a German actor and director. Born in Szeged, Hungary on 2 April 1942, he died in Gais, Switzerland, at the age of 82.

== Filmography ==
- Preis der Freiheit (1966)
- Skin to Skin (1969)
- Baal (1970)
- Eines langen Tages Reise in die Nacht (1973)
- Das Blaue Palais: Das Genie (1974)
- Das Blaue Palais: Das Medium (1974)
- The Conquest of the Citadel (1977)
- The Roaring Fifties (1983)
- The Record (1984)
- Zwei Nasen tanken Super (1984)
- The Old Fox - Season 8, Episode 4: "Von Mord war nicht Die Rede" (1984)
- Derrick - Season 11, Episode 10: "Ende einer Sehnsucht" (1984)
- Derrick - Season 12, Episode 8: "Schwester Hilde" (1985)
- Tatort - Episode 171: "Das Haus Im Wald" (1985)
- Kunyonga: Murder in Africa (1986)
- Sierra Leone (1987)
- The Aggression (1988)
- Die Senkrechtstarter (1989)
- Spider's Web (1989)
- Mau Mau (1992)
- The Light from Dead Stars (1994)
- Heaven or Bust (1995)
- Der Hurenstreik – Eine Liebe auf St. Pauli (1999)
- Sweet Little Sixteen (1999)
- Delta Team – Auftrag geheim! (1999)
- Days of Darkness (1999)
- Schwurgericht – Seitenwechsel (1999)
- In der Mitte eines Lebens (2002)
- Davon stirbt man nicht (2002)
- Vier Küsse und eine E-Mail (2003)
- Cowgirl (2004)
- Iron Fist (2014, TV film)
