= Evelyn Opela =

German television actress (born 1945)

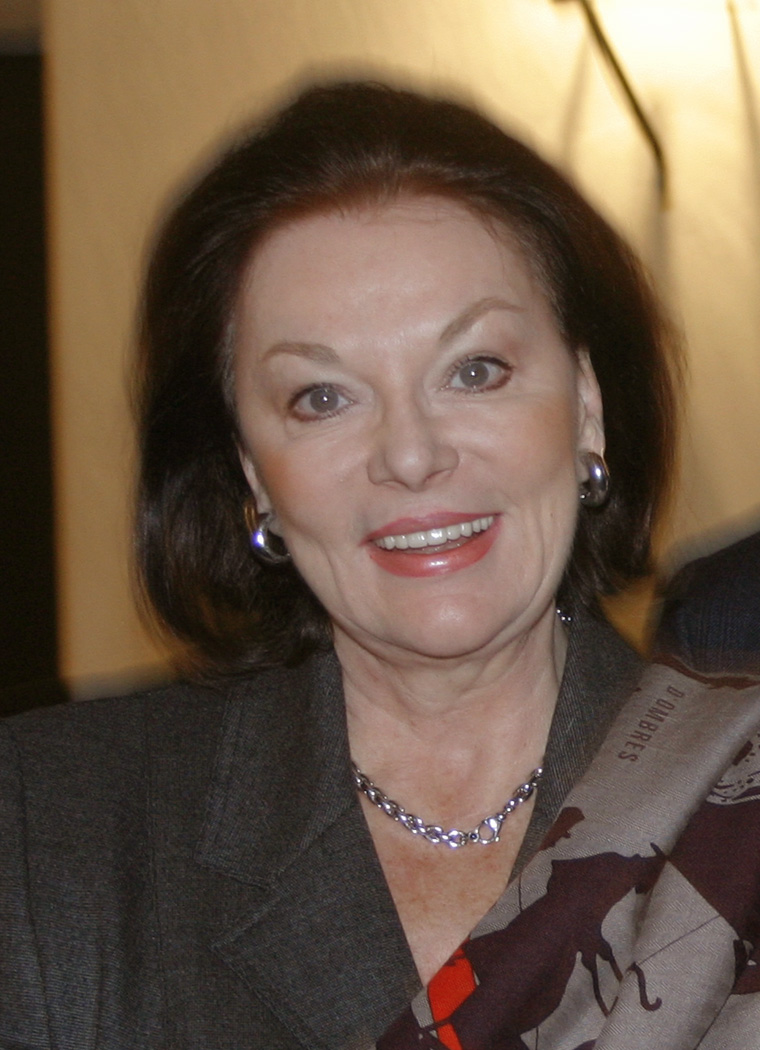
- Born: 4 February 1945 (age 81); Warnsdorf, Germany
- Spouse: Helmut Ringelmann (1986)
- Website: https://web.archive.org/web/20061206070620/http://www.agentur-jovanovic.de/Klientel/Actress/opela.htm

Evelyn Opela (born 4 February 1945 in Warnsdorf Sudetenland now Varnsdorf, Czech Republic) is a German television actress.

In 1986 she married German television film producer Helmut Ringelmann. She lives in Munich.

== Selected filmography ==
=== Movies ===
- 1971: Morgen fällt die Schule aus
- 1972: Betragen ungenügend!
- 1973: Pan
- 1973: Hubertus Castle
- 1976: Silence in the Forest
- 1993: Night Train to Venice

=== TV ===
- 1971: Das falsche Gewicht
- 1971: Nasrin oder Die Kunst zu träumen
- 1972: Der Amateur
- 1973: Im Schillingshof
- 1974: Commenius
- 1976: Das Blaue Palais: Unsterblichkeit
- 1977: Die Rückkehr des alten Herrn
- 1979: Das ewig Menschliche
- 1984: House Guest
- 1984: Derrick - Season 11, Episode 11: "Gangster haben andere Spielregeln" (Gangsters play differently)
- 1985: Goldene Zeiten – Bittere Zeiten
- 1991: Derrick - Season 18, Folge 205: "Das Lächeln des Doktor Bloch"

and TV series including Das Traumschiff, Tatort, The Old Fox, Der Mann ohne Schatten, SOKO 5113

=== Theater ===
- Das Vergnügen, anständig zu sein (Düsseldorfer Schauspielhaus)
- Der Kammersänger (Düsseldorfer Schauspielhaus)
- Der Meteor (Theater in der Josefstadt, Vienna)
- Der Mann, das Tier und die Tugend (Tournee)
- Zwei Damen zuviel (Tournee)
