= Wolf Roth =

German theatre and television actor (born 1944)

- Born: August 30, 1944 (age 81); Torgau, Germany
- Education: Free University of Berlin
- Occupation: Actor
- Years active: 1967–2018

Wolf Roth (born August 30, 1944) is a German theatre and television actor.

== Early life and education ==
Roth was born in Torgau, Germany, where his family had fled during World War II. He was raised and educated in Bremen. In 1961 he moved to the United States and graduated from the Edsel Ford High School in Detroit, Michigan. He spent the next months travelling through the Midwest of the U.S.

== Career ==
Having returned to Germany, he graduated in Bremen and went on to the Free University of Berlin. He took courses in sociology and economics, but found his vocation when he was taken by friends to the entrance examinations of the famous Max Reinhardt Seminar for actors. He was discovered by the actress Hilde Körber, and while still in the seminar, he was seen and engaged by Boleslaw Barlog. He made his theatrical debut in the play Squaring the Circle by Valentin Kataev in 1967. Subsequently he joined the theatre in Oberhausen, where he portrayed several roles. He left Oberhausen in 1969 to continue his career in Berlin, where he played in the Berliner Theater and the Schaubühne. During this time, he started to work in television and the movies, where his main work has been since then. Films include Goldene Zeiten (2006) (as the character Jürgen Matthies).

== Theatre ==
- Squaring the Circle by Valentin Kataev, Schiller Theater Werkstatt Berlin, 1967
- Half Way Up a Tree by Peter Ustinov, "Robert", Oberhausen, 1967/68
- The Threepenny Opera by Bertold Brecht, "Filch", Oberhausen, 1967/68
- Farewell in June by Alexander Vampilov, "Kolesov", Oberhausen, 1967/68
- La belle Hélène by Jacques Offenbach, "Paris", Oberhausen, 1967/68
- Kaspar by Peter Handke (world première), "Einsager", Oberhausen, 11.5.1968
- The Robbers by Friedrich Schiller, "Franz Moor", Oberhausen, 1968
- The Knack by Ann Jellicoe, "Tolen", Oberhausen, 1968
- Avanti! by Samuel A. Taylor, directed by Viktor de Kowa, "Baldo Pantaleone", with Günter Pfitzmann, Berliner Theater, 1969

=== Piano concerts ===
- In his youth Wolf Roth studied to become a professional pianist. At the age of 12 he gave his first concert with Mozart, at the age of 14 he played his first Beethoven concert and at the age of 16, when in the U.S., he played the Warsaw Concerto by Richard Addinsell and the Rhapsody in Blue by George Gershwin before audiences. As Franz Moor in The Robbers he had to play the piano on stage (it was a modern dress production) and was so good, that it was almost impossible to convince the critics and the audience, that they were watching a 'live performance' and not listening to an audio recording.

== Selected films ==
- Perrak (dir. Alfred Vohrer, 1970), as Nick
- Ich werde dich töten, Wolf (dir. Wolfgang Petersen, 1971), as Wolf
- Der Kommissar: Das Komplott (1973, TV series episode), as Waldemar Dettmann
- Der kleine Doktor: Besuch aus Paris (1974, TV series episode), as Philippe
- One or the Other of Us (dir. Wolfgang Petersen, 1974), as Hohenberg
- Der Kommissar: Der Tod des Apothekers (1975, TV series episode), as Edward Scholl
- High Risk (1976, TV film), as Erik
- Quincy, M.E.: Hot Ice, Cold Hearts (1977, TV series episode), as Müller
- The African Queen (1977, TV film), as Lt. Biedemeyer
- Peter Voss, Thief of Millions (1977, TV series, 13 episodes), as Peter Voss
- Plutonium (dir. Rainer Erler, 1978, TV film), as Porfirio Perez
- Fleisch (dir. Rainer Erler, 1979, TV film), as Bill
- High Society Limited (1982), as Moll
- Derrick: Via Genua (1983, TV series episode), as Achim Huber
- Manimal: Night of the Scorpion (1983, TV series episode), as Russian Agent
- Derrick: Ein Spiel mit dem Tod (1984, TV series episode), as Ulrich Hossner
- Cover Up: Rules to Die By (1985, TV series episode), as Nicholas
- Scarecrow and Mrs. King: DOA: Delirious on Arrival (1985, TV series episode), as Hans Retzig
- Die roten Elefanten (1986, TV series, 7 episodes), as Karl Wegener
- Derrick: Entlassen Sie diesen Mann nicht! (1986, TV series episode), as Dr. Kraus
- Das Erbe der Guldenburgs (1987–1990, TV series, 26 episodes), as Thomas Count von Guldenburg
- Derrick: Höllensturz (1990, TV series episode), as Arnold Kiesing
- Derrick: Caprese in der Stadt (1991, TV series episode), as Gaug
- Derrick: Der Schrei (1991, TV series episode), as Simon Krüger
- Praxis Bülowbogen (1991–1994, TV series, 25 episodes), as Carlos Neuhaus
- Derrick: Die seltsame Sache Liebe (1993, TV series episode), as Seidel
- Derrick: Gib dem Mörder nicht die Hand (1994, TV series episode), as Gerhard Schumann
- Air Albatros (1994–1995, TV series, 26 episodes), as Niklas Haerlin
- Derrick: Abendessen mit Bruno (1994, TV series episode), as Herr Mandy
- Derrick: Ein Mord, zweiter Teil (1995, TV series episode), as Rudolf Kollau
- Derrick: Eines Mannes Herz (1995, TV series episode), as Arnold Bertram
- Derrick: Die Ungerührtheit der Mörder (1995, TV series episode), as Professor Weiland
- Verbrechen die Geschichte machten: Frauenmörder Arwed Imiela (1997, TV series episode), as Arwed Imiela
- Davids Rache (1997, TV film), as David
- Derrick: Mama Kaputtke (1998, TV series episode), as Herr Reuter
- Dark Realm: She's the One (2000, TV series episode), as Dr. Zabriskie
- Code Name: Eternity: The Shift (2000, TV series episode), as Kard
- Personal Trainer (2001, TV film), as Körner
- Goldene Zeiten (2006), as Jürgen Matthies
- Mord ist mein Geschäft, Liebling (2009), as Paolo Rossi
- The Protectors (2009, TV series, 2 episodes), as Christoph Meyer
- Alarm for Cobra 11 – The Highway Police: The Panther (2009, TV series episode), as Alexander Christo
- Russisch Roulette (2012, TV film), as Wolfgang Fischer
- A Hitman's Solitude Before the Shot (2014), as Generalleutnant Vanhaarten
- Fantastic Beasts: The Crimes of Grindelwald (2018), as Spielman
