= Walter Kreye =

German actor (born 1942)

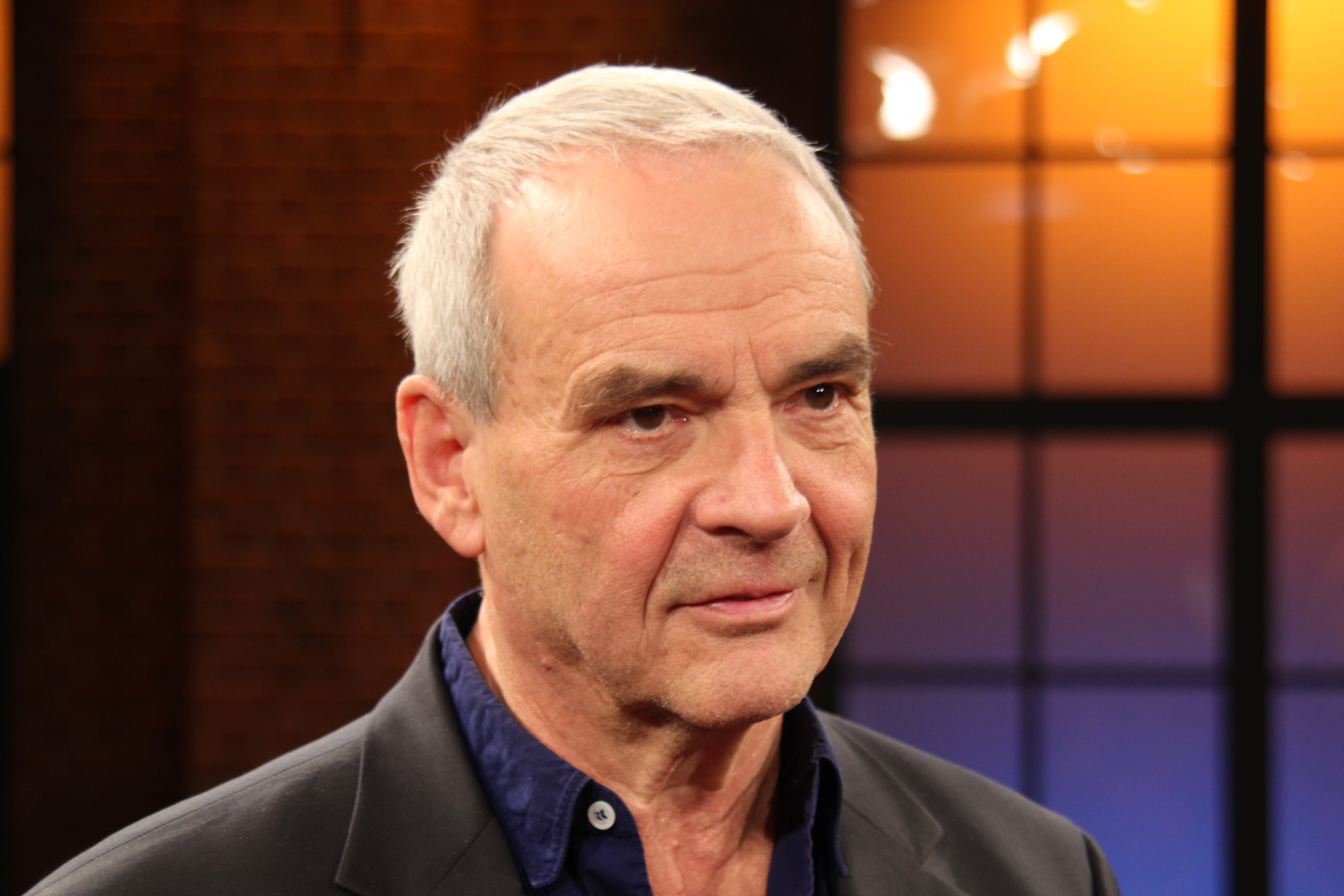
- Kreye in 2012
- Born: 18 July 1942 (age 83); Oldenburg, Lower Saxony, Germany
- Occupation: Actor

Walter Kreye (born 18 July 1942) is a German actor.

== Biography ==
Kreye is the son of radio editor and writer Walter A. Kreye. He graduated from Bochum Drama School and then had theater engagements at the Hamburg Schauspielhaus, the Thalia Theater, and the Stuttgart State Theater.

From 1980, he appeared in the television series Ein Fall für zwei, Praxis Bülowbogen, Der Fahnder, and Tatort. In 1990, he won the silver Grimme-Preis for his performance in Reporter. In 2007, he succeeded Rolf Schimpf in the crime series The Old Fox as chief inspector Rolf Herzog. In 2017, Kreye appeared in the Netflix series Dark as Tronte Nielsen.

Kreye is married to actress Sabine Wegner and has two daughters and a son from his first marriage. In 2011, he was diagnosed with colon cancer, which caused him to stop performing until after his recovery.

== Selected filmography ==
List of film and television appearances, with year, title, and role shown
Year	Title	Role	Notes
1989	Reporter	Pit Wilkens	9 episodes
1989–1997	Ein Fall für zwei		6 episodes
1994	Adelheid und ihre Mörder		1 episode
1996	Polizeiruf 110		
1997	Tatort		
1997	Polizeiruf 110		
1997	Doppelter Einsatz		
1998	Tatort		
1998	Der Clown		
1999–2000	Tatort		
2000	Polizeiruf 110		
2005	Die Rosenheim-Cops		
2005	Katze im Sack	Brockmann	Feature film
2005	Tatort		
2005–2009	Der Dicke	Martin Brüggemann	20 episodes
2006	Unter weißen Segeln		
2006	SOKO München		
2007	K3 – Kripo Hamburg		
2007	Siska		
2008–2012	The Old Fox		
2012	Das Traumschiff		
2015	Die Chefin		
2015	Donna Leon (TV series)		
2015	Notruf Hafenkante		
2017	In aller Freundschaft		
2017	Dark	Tronte Nielsen	7 episodes
2018	Stuttgart Homicide		
