= Gerd Böckmann =

German actor (born 1944)

Gerd Böckmann (born 11 January 1944 in Chemnitz, Germany) is a German television actor.

== Selected filmography ==
=== Television ===
- The Unguarded House (1975, TV film)
- Derrick - Season 2, Episode 10: "Kamillas junger Freund" (1975, TV)
- Derrick - Season 4, Episode 6: "Das Kuckucksei" (1977, TV)
- The Buddenbrooks (1979, TV series)
- Derrick - Season 10, Episode 8: "Attentat auf Derrick" (1983, TV)
- The Wannsee Conference (1984, TV film), as Adolf Eichmann
- Derrick - Season 12, Episode 4: "Toter Goldfisch" (1985, TV)
- Der Mann ohne Schatten (1996, TV series)
- Uprising (2001, TV film), as Heinz Auerswald

=== Film ===
- The Standard (1977)
- Adventure (2011)
