= Reporter (TV series) =

German television series

- Directed by: Klaus Emmerich; Hans Noever
- Starring: Renan Demirkan; Walter Kreye; Dietmar Schönherr; Jürgen Holtz
- Country of origin: Germany

Reporter is a German television series.

== See also ==
- List of German television series
