= Das Erbe der Guldenburgs =

- Genre: Family drama
- Created by: Michael Baier
- Starring: Christiane Hörbiger; Brigitte Horney; Wolf Roth; Iris Berben; Wilfried Baasner; Jochen Horst; Katharina Böhm; Ruth Maria Kubitschek; Sigmar Solbach; Susanne Uhlen; Sydne Rome
- Country of origin: West Germany
- No. of seasons: 3
- No. of episodes: 39

Production
- Production company: Neue Deutsche Filmgesellschaft

Original release
- Network: ZDF
- Release: 29 January 1987 – 19 May 1990

Das Erbe der Guldenburgs ("The legacy of the Guldenburgs") is a German television series that originally aired on ZDF from 1987 to 1990 and revolves around the destiny of the Guldenburgs, a wealthy aristocratic family, and their nouveau riche enemies, the Balbecks.

While panned by critics during its original run, the show was very popular with the audience. However, reviews have been more positive in recent years, acknowledging its strong female characters and juicy dialogues.

== Plot ==
Martin Count von Guldenburg, head of an old aristocratic and seemingly wealthy dynasty known for its brewery, celebrates his 60th birthday on the family's estate north of Hamburg.

Shortly after, he dies in a car accident however, leaving behind his wife Christine with huge debts and the bitter realization that he had betrayed her with his Italian mistress Carina di Angeli for years. That relationship even produced an illegitimate son.

While Christine tries to save the family empire, she not only has to fight its worst enemies, the Balbecks, a nouveau riche clan owning a big brewery in Hamburg, but also her stubborn mother-in-law Hertha, the dowager countess; her estranged stepson Thomas; and Achim Lauritzen, her dysfunctional stepdaughter Evelyn's shady husband.

== Cast and characters ==
- Christiane Hörbiger as Christine Countess von Guldenburg
- Brigitte Horney as Hertha Dowager Countess von Guldenburg (season 1-2)
- Karl-Heinz Vosgerau as Martin Count von Guldenburg (pilot only)
- Wolf Roth as Thomas Count von Guldenburg (season 1-2)
- Iris Berben as Evelyn Lauritzen
- Wilfried Baasner as Achim Lauritzen
- Jochen Horst as Alexander 'Sascha' Count von Guldenburg (season 1-2)
- Katharina Böhm as Susanne 'Nane' Countess von Guldenburg
- Jürgen Goslar as Dr. Max von Guldenburg (season 1)
- Ruth Maria Kubitschek as Margot Balbeck
- Sigmar Solbach as Jan Balbeck
- Susanne Uhlen as Kirsten 'Kitty' Balbeck
- Friedrich Schütter as Kurt Kröger
- Ingeborg Christiansen as Johanna Kröger
- Alexander Wussow as Tobias Kröger
- Sydne Rome as Carina di Angeli
- Christopher Buchholz as Claudio Torres (season 3)
- Stewart Granger as Jack Brinkley (season 1)
- Ute Lemper as Peggy Brinkley (season 1)
- Monika Peitsch as Aenne Günther
- Karl Schönböck as Count Steinfeld
- Friedrich von Thun as Johannes von Merungen (season 2-3)
- Bernhard Wicki as Friedrich von Guldenburg (season 3)

== Trivia ==
- The majority of episodes were shot in Hamburg and Schleswig-Holstein, but filming also took place in other European countries and even Rio de Janeiro. While Wotersen Castle was used for exterior shots of the fictional Guldenburg Castle, a mansion later belonging to music producer Dieter Bohlen served as the backdrop for the Balbeck estate.
- Brigitte Horney died only two days after finishing the filming of season 2. As she played one of the leading characters, scripts for season 3 had to be rewritten.
- The show was a big ratings success for public network ZDF, garnering up to 18 million viewers, and is considered one of its last blockbusters before the rise of privately owned networks in Germany.

== See also ==
- List of German television series
