= Lyne Chardonnet =

French actress

- Born: 5 May 1943; Paris, France
- Died: 11 December 1980 (aged 37); Enghien-les-Bains, France
- Occupation: Actor
- Years active: 1966–1980

Lyne Catherine Jeanne Chardonnet (5 May 1943 – 11 December 1980) was a French actress. She appeared in more than forty films from 1966 to 1981, the last one was released posthumously a year after his death.

== Filmography ==
Year	Title	Role	Notes
1966	The War Is Over	La jolie blonde	Uncredited
1968	Benjamin	Jacotte	
1968	Le tatoué	Valérie Mézeray	
1968	Mayerling	Hanna Vetsera	
1969	Clérambard	Brigitte Galuchon	
1969	Bruno, l'enfant du dimanche	Valérie Moktans	
1969	I. You. They.	La dactylo	
1969	My Uncle Benjamin	Arabelle Minxit	
1972	L'oeuf	Charlotte Berthoullet	
1972	A Time for Loving	La fille du bar	
1974	Le Protecteur	La fille blonde	
1974	One-Eyed Men Are Kings		Short
1974	Dada au coeur	Christa	
1974	Das Blaue Palais	Yvonne Boucher	TV series, 3 episodes
1976	Dracula and Son	L'infirmière	
1976	The Toy	Mlle Blond	
1977	Man in a Hurry	L'hôtesse de l'air	
1979	Lady Oscar	Une invitée du bal noir	
1980	Three Men to Kill	L'infirmière au dossier	
1980	The Wonderful Day	Geneviève	
1981	Chanel Solitaire	Young Nun	Posthumous release Final film role
