= Das falsche Gewicht =

1971 West German drama film

- Directed by: Bernhard Wicki
- Written by: Bernhard Wicki; Fritz Hochwälder
- Based on: Weights and Measures by Joseph Roth
- Starring: Helmut Qualtinger; Evelyn Opela; Agnes Fink
- Cinematography: Jerzy Lipman
- Edited by: Clara Fabry; Eva Maria Tittes
- Music by: George Gruntz
- Release date: 21 November 1971 (West Germany)
- Running time: 146 minutes
- Country: West Germany
- Language: German

Das falsche Gewicht (False Weights) is a 1971 West German drama film directed by Bernhard Wicki and produced for ZDF before receiving a limited theatrical release in 1973. Adapted from the 1937 novel Weights and Measures by Joseph Roth, it centres on the uncompromising provincial inspector of weights and measures Anselm Eibenschütz (played by Helmut Qualtinger) whose rigid moral code collides with the corruption of an impoverished Galician border village on the eve of the First World War.

== Plot and themes ==
Set in the eastern marches of the Austro-Hungarian Empire, the narrative depicts Eibenschütz's attempt to impose strict standards of honesty upon traders who routinely cheat customers by manipulating their scales. His idealism—rooted in former k.u.k. military discipline—isolates him from both the villagers and his own family and ultimately drives him toward personal ruin, offering an allegory for the crumbling imperial order and the fragility of ethical absolutes under economic duress.

== Development and production ==
Wicki co-wrote the screenplay with dramatist Fritz Hochwälder, preserving Roth's tone while expanding several secondary characters to underline social tensions in late-imperial Galicia. Principal photography ran from 16 February to 22 April 1970 at the Pasarét Studios in Budapest and on location in Vác and Sződliget, Hungary. Cinematographer Jerzy Lipman shot the film in Eastmancolor (35 mm, 1.37:1).

== Release and reception ==
ZDF premiered the 146-minute telefilm on 21 November 1971, scheduling it for late-evening broadcast. A shortened theatrical print opened on 26 January 1973 at the Film-Casino in Munich, distributed by Scotia.

== Awards and legacy ==
At the 1971 Goldene Kamera ceremony Helmut Qualtinger received Best Actor, while Wicki secured Best Director for their work on the film; both were honoured again with Filmbänder in Gold the following year, and cinematographer Lipman and supporting actor István Iglódi likewise earned Federal Film Prizes.
