= Renan Demirkan =

Turkish–German writer and actress

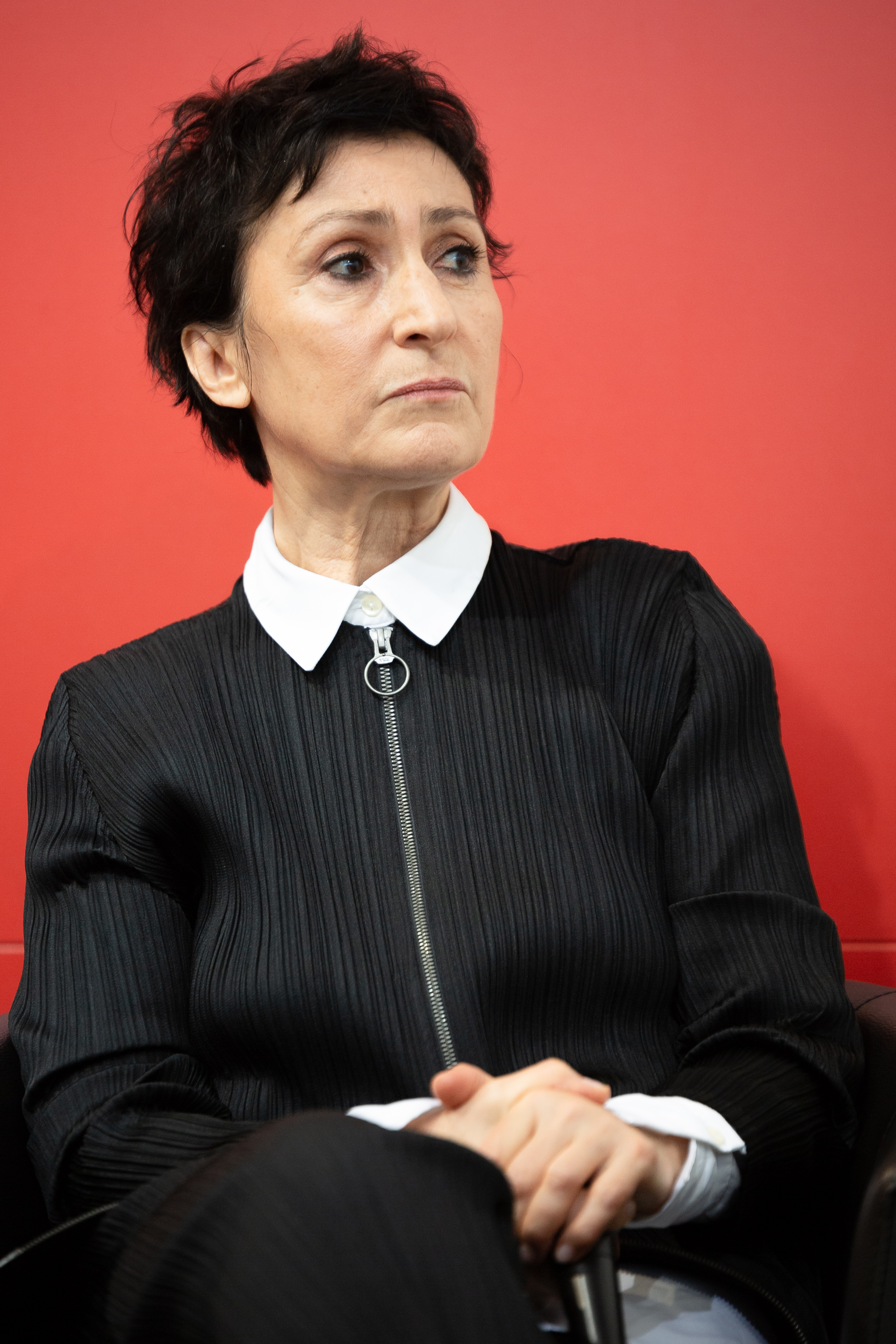
- Demirkan in 2018
- Born: Renan Demirkan; 12 June 1955 (age 70); Ankara, Turkey
- Years active: 1982–present
- Website: http://www.renan-demirkan.de/

Renan Demirkan (born 12 June 1955) is a Turkish-born German writer and actress. In 2016, she initiated the call "checkpoint:demokratie", which became a registered association in May 2017 and of which she is the chair of the board. In June 2017, she founded the non-profit company "Zeit der Maulbeeren", of which she is the managing director. The project is supported by the state of NRW and is a free three-week offer to financially needy women with cancer, with or without children.

== Filmography ==
- 1984: Super
- 1984: Don Carlos
- 1985: On the Killer's Track
- 1988: Reporter
- 1989: Er – Sie – Es
- 1989: Quarantäne
- 1991: Forever Young
- 1992: Auge um Auge
- 1992: Der Augenzeuge
- 1992: The Great Bellheim
- 1993: Das Sahara-Projekt
- 1995: Inzest – Ein Fall für Sina Teufel
- 1998: Reise in die Nacht
- 2005: Unter weißen Segeln

== Publications ==
- Schwarzer Tee mit drei Stück Zucker. Roman, 1991.
- Die Frau mit Bart. Erzählung, 1994.
- Es wird Diamanten regnen vom Himmel. Roman, 1999.
- Über Liebe, Götter und Rasenmähn. Geschichten, 2003.
- Septembertee. Autobiographie, 2008.

== Awards ==
Demirkan has won numerous awards including the Goldene Kamera (1989), the Adolf Grimme Awards (1990), the Theaterpreis INTHEGA (2002) and the Bundesverdienstkreuz (1998).
