= Das Blaue Palais =

- Genre: Science fiction
- Created by: Rainer Erler
- Starring: Jean-Henri Chambois; Lyne Chardonnet
- Composer: Eugen Thomass
- Countries of origin: West Germany; France
- Original language: German
- No. of episodes: 5

Production
- Camera setup: Frank Brühne; Joseph Vilsmaier
- Running time: 450 (5 x 90) min.
- Production companies: Bavaria Atelier GmbH; ORTF

Original release
- Release: 15 October 1974 – 16 November 1976

Das Blaue Palais is a series of five television feature films written and directed by German author and filmmaker Rainer Erler. All five stories about the research and findings of an interdisciplinary scientific project have also been published as novels by Goldmann in 1978 ("Das Genie"), 1979 ("Das Medium", "Unsterblichkeit", "Der Verräter") and 1980 ("Der Gigant"). The series had an international cast. It was shot in Bavaria, Scotland, the United States and Asia.

== Cast ==
| Character | Actor | Episode |
|---|---|---|
| Prof. Manzini | Jean-Henri Chambois | All |
| Louis Palm | Silvano Tranquilli | All |
| Enrico Polazzo | Dieter Laser | All |
| Yvonne Boucher | Lyne Chardonnet | 1-3 |
| Yvonne Boucher | Helga Anders | 4-5 |
| Sibilla Jacopescu | Luminița Iacobescu | 1-3 |
| Sibilla Jacopescu | Evelyn Opela | 4 |
| Jeroen de Groot | Peter Fricke | All |
| Carolus Büdel | András Fricsay Kali Son | 1-3 |
| Carolus Büdel | Eric P. Caspar | 4-5 |
| Eugen von Klöpfer | Werner Rundshagen | 1-3 |
| Kühn | Herbert Steinmetz | All |
| Felix van Reijn | Rolf Henniger | 1 |
| Mizuguchi | Kenzo Nishimura | 1 |
| Weigand | Georg Marischka | 2 |
| Dr Cavington | Edward Meeks | 3 |
| Ian Mackenzie | Udo Vioff | 4 |
| McLean | Ben Zeller | 5 |

=== Overview of all episodes ===
| No. | Title | Air date |
|---|---|---|
| 1 | "Das Genie" | October 15, 1974 |
A phenomenon is brought to the attention of the group of scientists known as "The Blue Palais": A hitherto unknown person is all of a sudden able to play the piano as brilliant as a pianist who just recently disappeared under unresolved circumstances.
| 2 | "Der Verräter" (The Traitor) | November 12, 1974 |
Laser specialist Klöpfer develops a new synthetic fertiliser. Palazzo believes the application of this chemical could cause an Apocalypse in the long run
| 3 | "Das Medium" (The medium) | December 10, 1974 |
Dr Cavington is a specialist in quantum mechanics. He investigates a young woman over supernatural talents because she has twice foreseen the coming lottery results.
| 4 | "Unsterblichkeit" (Immortality) | October 19, 1976 |
Scottish biologist Ian McKenzie seems to have found the key to immortality.
| 5 | "Der Gigant" | November 16, 1976 |
Chemist Enrico Polazzo works on a fully synthetic steel. He is hired by a multi-national company which cannot be trusted...
