= Vittoria Di Silverio =

Italian actress

- Maria Vittoria Ghirighini
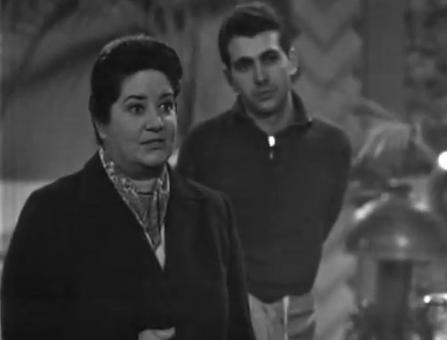
- Di Silverio in the episode "The old lady of Bayeux" from the television drama The inquiries by Commissioner Maigret (Italy, 1966, M. Landi)
- Born: 1907
- Occupation: Actress
- Children: Biagio Gambini

Vittoria Di Silverio, also known as Maria Vittoria Ghirighini, was an Italian film, television, and stage actress. She was best known for her roles in films such as L'homme orchestre (1969) and The Conquest of the Citadel (1977).

== Biography ==
Di Silverio's career in stage acting began in 1917. Once spotted, this was followed by many appearances on Italian television, from the mid-1950s until the early 1980s, with her final public appearance at the Taormina Film Fest in 1993. She was the mother of actor, stuntman, and model Biagio Gambini (1926–1986), grandmother of actress Nella Gambini (1953–2016) and aunt of the actor Luciano Catenacci (1933–1990) and actress Francesca Romana Coluzzi (1943–2009).
