= The Conquest of the Citadel =

1977 film

- Film poster
- Directed by: Bernhard Wicki
- Written by: Bernhard Wicki; Günter Herburger
- Produced by: Jürgen Dohme; Gunther Witte
- Starring: András Fricsay
- Cinematography: Igor Luther
- Edited by: Jane Seitz
- Release date: 8 June 1977
- Running time: 151 minutes
- Country: West Germany
- Language: German

The Conquest of the Citadel (German: Die Eroberung der Zitadelle) is a 1977 West German drama film directed by Bernhard Wicki. It was entered into the 27th Berlin International Film Festival.

== Cast ==
- András Fricsay as Hermann Brucker
- Antonia Reininghaus as Alessandra
- Armando Brancia as Rodolfo Battipana
- Dieter Kirchlechner as Niccolo Battipana
- Ivan Desny as Faconi
- Kostas Papanastasiou as Yamalakis
- Kurt Mergenthal as Iker
- Vittoria Di Silverio as Rosa Battipana
- Assunta De Maggi as Sophia
- Elena De Maggi as Lucia
