= Fleisch (film) =

1979 television film

- DVD cover
- Written by: Rainer Erler
- Directed by: Rainer Erler
- Starring: Wolf Roth; Jutta Speidel
- Narrated by: ZDF
- Music by: Eugen Thomass
- Country of origin: West Germany
- Original language: German

Production
- Producers: Rainer Erler; Helmut Rasp
- Cinematography: Wolfgang Grasshoff; Wolf Bachmann
- Editor: Hilwa von Boro
- Running time: 114 minutes

Original release
- Release: 21 May 1979

Fleisch (German for flesh or meat; international title: Spare Parts) is a German television thriller directed by Rainer Erler. Released in 1979, the film focuses on organ trafficking. Fleisch has been recognized as a cult film.

== Plot ==
A newly married couple is spending their honeymoon in the southwestern United States. Suddenly, the unbelievable happens: the husband is kidnapped and assaulted by paramedics in an ambulance. The wife escapes at the last minute, and is picked up by a truck driver. Together they embark on the search for the kidnapped husband, encountering a dangerous and perfectly organized syndicate that supplies the world's wealthy customers in organs of young, healthy people.

== Cast ==
- Jutta Speidel - Monica
- Wolf Roth - Bill
- Herbert Herrmann - Mike
- Charlotte Kerr - Dr. Jackson

== Production ==
It was produced for ZDF and was telecast on 16 June 1979 on German television. The cast of the film includes Jutta Speidel and Wolf Roth.

== Remake ==
The television station ProSieben narrated the 2008 remake of the film, which was directed by Oliver Schmitz, the movie starred Sebastian Ströbel and Theresa Scholze.

== Books ==
Erler subsequently turned his screenplay into a novel which was originally published by Goldmann Verlag. A revised edition was released by Shayol Verlag in 2006.
