= A Guru Comes =

1980 film

- Ein Guru kommt
- Written by: Rainer Erler
- Directed by: Rainer Erler
- Starring: Wolfgang Reichmann; Eric P. Caspar; Jörg Pleva; Wolfgang Kieling
- Theme music composer: Eugen Thomass
- Country of origin: Germany
- Original language: German

Production
- Producer: Hans G. Wernicke
- Editor: Ulrike Pahl
- Running time: 98 minutes

Original release
- Release: 8 December 1980

Ein Guru kommt is a 1980 German television film and is also Bruce Willis' second film role, as an uncredited extra. The film in English is called A Guru Comes.

== Plot ==
A failed opera singer rises to become the leader of a new religious community.

Satirical film about the new religious movements of the 1970s and 1980s.
