= Gottfried Schapper =

Gottfried Schapper (16 December 1888 in Groß Möringen – after 8 May 1945, in the district of Stendal) was a German listening specialist, before and during World War II. Schapper was an Signals intelligence officer, who was known for having the original idea for the Forschungsamt signal intelligence agency. Schapper had worked in the Reichswehr Ministry cipher bureau from 1927 to 1933, which would later form part of Luftwaffe signals intelligence unit, had been dissatisfied by both the scope of monitoring and intercept work and the incompetence of the methods employed there. He along with some colleagues, including the convinced Nazi, Hans Schimpf, proposed to Hermann Göring that a separate signals office be created that would be free from department ties.

== Personal life ==
Gottfried Schapper

Schapper was the son of the protestant pastor Karl Schapper and grew up with seven siblings. His eldest brother (son from the father's first marriage) is the resistance fighter against national socialism and labour leader Karl Schapper, his youngest (like Gottfried from second marriage) the prophet Helmut Schapper. During 1919 he was married, and had a son in 1934.

== Career ==
Gottfried Schapper was promoted to Fahnenjunker in 1910 and posted to a radio communications unit, and promoted to Lieutenant in the railroad regiment No. 2 in Hanau (German Army (German Empire)). By 1913 he was transferred to Signals. During World War I, he was deployed on both the West and the Eastern Front. From 1916 to 1917, he was director of the cryptographic office in the Reichswehr signals intelligence office and in 1919 he was promoted to the civil service rank of director (German: Ministerial Direktor) of the whole signals intelligence service. During 1918, he was Divisional Signals Commander with various divisions in the west. In 1919, he was discharged with a military rank of captain (German: Hauptmann)

In 1920, he became secretary to the National Society of Berlin for Rescuing the Reich from the Revolution, Nationale Vereinigung (National Association) and was a participant in the Kapp Putsch. Schapper joined the Nazi Party in 1920 and a remained party member until 1923. From 1920, he worked as a kind of manager for national organizations, newspapers, clubs and clubs, until 1927.

From 1927, Schapper played a key role in centralizing the scattered interception and decryption departments of the Ministry of the Reichswehr (German: Reichswehrministerium). He became director of the cryptographic office (German: chiffrierstelle) in the Reichswehrministerium and stepped back in 1933, because he was dissatisfied with the incompetent methods on site. A quote regarding Schapper at the time, that is attributed to the spy Hans-Thilo Schmidt who stated:

He was always talking about the unease felt as much in the Abwehr as in the chiffrierstelle due to the chaotic organization of the research and analysis of the intelligence. Everyone gets involved, military and civilian, sailors, airmen, police, foreign affairs, postal, customs and so on.

He joined the Nazi Party again in 1931.

== Forschungsamt ==
From 1933 to 1937 or 1938 he was a member of the SS and had the rank of SS-Hauptsturmführer. He resigned, as they refused to recognize his Christian philosophy of life. Gottfried Schapper's idea for a new central intelligence agency took form as early as 1927. As quoted by Hans-Thilo Schmidt:

Schapper's idea, in line with Patzig and many other specialists in the Abwehr, is to create a Central Intelligence Office. This organization would be directly dependent on the chancellor [Hitler, who was not yet in power], and would centralize and coordinate research and would oversee its analysis

In 1933 he turned to Hermann Göring, who was an acquaintance from the First World War, to create the new agency. Schmidt stated:

The main aspects of the project were submitted by Schapper to Göring. If the Führer approves in turn, and if the Nazis take power, then it is likely this reform will happen. Schapper will then occupy an important place and will surely ask me to take a place next to him.

Hans Schimpf, who was a close friend of Göring was selected, along with 8 key people, and Schapper to create the new agency, which started operation in March 1933.

He became head of a subsection, later head of a section of the Research Office of the Reich Air Ministry (German: Forschungsamt). From 12 October 1943 to 8 May 1945 Schapper was the head of the Forschungsamt. During his leadership, he was initially active in Berlin and after numerous bombardments in Breslau and Kaufbeuren. He was arrested near Rosenheim in May 1945 and taken to Salzburg and Augsburg, where he was interrogated by TICOM, the project formed in World War II by the United States to find and seize German intelligence assets.
