= Rolf Schimpf =

German television actor (1924–2025)

- Born: 14 November 1924; Berlin, Weimar Republic
- Died: 22 March 2025 (aged 100); Munich, Bavaria, Germany
- Occupation: Actor
- Spouse: Ilse Zielstorff (m. 1968; died 2015)
- Children: Daniel Schimpf
- Father: Hans Schimpf

Rolf Schimpf (14 November 1924 – 22 March 2025) was a German actor, most famous for his portrayal of Leo Kress in the ZDF crime drama television series The Old Fox from 1986 to 2007, with guest appearance in 2009.

== Life and career ==
Rolf Schimpf was the son of the marine officer Hans Schimpf, the grandchild of Rosa Helene Schimpf and Ernst Schimpf, the great-grandchild of the composer Christian Fink and the great-great-grandchild of the entrepreneur Jakob Ferdinand Schreiber. He served in the Sturmartillerie troops in World War II, where he suffered a severe injury to the head.

After the war Schimpf studied for a career in trade at the Hengstenberg company in Esslingen am Neckar, after which he started studying acting at the Gensichen drama school in Stuttgart. After his studies he played in various theatres, such as the Luzern city theatre (1959–1960) and the Bern city theatre (1960–1962). He also played at the Württembergischen Staatstheater in Stuttgart, at the theatre of Lübeck, at the theater 53 theatre in Hamburg, at the artist theatre in Hamburg and at the Hamburger Kammerspielen under the supervision of Ida Ehre.

Television viewers know Schimpf best for his portrayal of Leo Kress in the ZDF crime series The Old Fox (German: Der Alte) from February 1986 to December 2007, as the first successor to the show's first lead actor Siegfried Lowitz. In December 2006 Schimpf stepped out of the show after having playing the lead character for over 20 years. His 222nd and last episode was filmed in December 2006. Episodes starring him were shown until December 2007. However, he still appeared in a guest role as retired chief inspector Leo Kress in the 340th episode Taximörder in May 2009.

Schimpf also appeared on television in supporting roles in the late 1950s. In the late 1960s, he appeared in the series Hafenkrankenhaus together with Anneli Granget and as the son of Inge Meysel in the series Ida Rogalski (1970). In the 1970s, he appeared in the series Meine Tochter - Unser Fräulein Doktor (1970), Mein Bruder - Der Herr Doktor Berger (1972) and Die Protokolle des Herrn M. (1979). He also appeared in the crime series SOKO 5113 (1968–1978), in the series Büro, Büro (1982), in the medicine series The Black Forest Clinic (1986) and in the series Aktenzeichen XY… ungelöst (for example episode 150 in 1982). His first television appearance as a lead character was in the satirical television film Der Sheriff von Linsenbach (1983). In 1984, he had a lead role in the series Mensch Bachmann where he gained greater popularity. The series was produced by Helmut Ringelmann, who got him the role of Leo Kress in The Old Fox a few years later. One of Schimpf's last roles was as Dr. Korbinian Niederbühl in the ARD telenovela Storm of Love.

Schimpf also worked in dubbing roles, among them the German-speaking voice of actor Bela Lugosi.

Schimpf was married to actress Ilse Zielstorff from 1968 until Zielstorff's death in May 2015. The couple had a son named Daniel, who is an architect.

In June 2010, the couple moved to the Augustinum old people's home in Neufriedenheim in Munich, where Schimpf stayed until November 2023. Schimpf's wife Zielstorff had to move to a caretaking home because of dementia. In late 2023, Schimpf, at that time suffering from dementia himself, had to move to a different old people's home because of financial difficulties.

Schimpf turned 100 on 14 November 2024, and died on 22 March 2025.

== Filmography ==
- Smuglere (1968)
- Mensch Bachmann (1984, TV series)
- The Old Fox (1986–2007, TV series)
