= Silence in the Forest (1976 film) =

- Directed by: Alfred Vohrer
- Written by: Ludwig Ganghofer (novel); Werner P. Zibaso
- Produced by: Horst Hächler
- Starring: Alexander Stephan; Belinda Mayne; Evelyn Opela
- Cinematography: Ernst W. Kalinke
- Edited by: Ingeborg Taschner
- Music by: Ernst Brandner
- Production company: Terra Film
- Distributed by: Constantin Film
- Release date: 13 October 1976
- Running time: 90 minutes
- Country: West Germany
- Language: German

Silence in the Forest (German: Das Schweigen im Walde) is a 1976 West German historical drama film directed by Alfred Vohrer and starring Alexander Stephan, Belinda Mayne and Evelyn Opela.

It is a heimatfilm, one of the last productions in the group of films produced in post-war Germany. It is based on Ludwig Ganghofer's novel of the same title which has been adapted for the screen several times.

== Cast ==
- Alexander Stephan as Götz Graf Ettingen
- Belinda Mayne as Lore Petri
- Evelyn Opela as Baronin Prankha
- Ferdy Mayne as Baron Sternfeld
- Walter Buschhoff as Sensburg
- Marius Aicher
- Sky du Mont
- Georg Einerdinger
- Bernhard Helfrich as Praxmaler
- Kathi Leitner
- Sepp Löffler as Kluibenschädl
- Edwige Pierre
- Ludwig Schmid-Wildy
- Erni Singerl
- Christian Vonderthann
- Hans Vonderthann

== Bibliography ==
- Goble, Alan. The Complete Index to Literary Sources in Film. Walter de Gruyter, 1999.
