= Mensch Bachmann =

- Starring: Rolf Schimpf
- Country of origin: West Germany

Mensch Bachmann is a 1984 West German television series.

== See also ==
- List of German television series
