= Eric P. Caspar =

Swiss actor

- Born: 14 May 1941 (age 85); Zürich, Switzerland
- Occupation: Actor
- Years active: 1970-present

Eric P. Caspar (born Jürg Kretz; 14 May 1941) is a Swiss actor. He appeared in more than fifty films since 1970.

== Selected filmography ==
| Year | Title | Role | Notes |
|---|---|---|---|
| 1976 | Das Blaue Palais | Carolus Büdel | TV series, 2 episodes |
| 1980 | A Guru Comes | | |
| 1995 | Joseph | | |
| 2010 | Transfer | Werner | |
