= Der Mann ohne Schatten =

- Starring: Gerd Böckmann; Evelyn Opela; Christian Berkel; Pierre Franckh; Hans Peter Hallwachs
- Country of origin: Germany

Der Mann ohne Schatten (The Man Without a Shadow) is a German television series.
