= Hans Schimpf =

German Reichsmarine and intelligence officer

Hans Friedrich Wilhelm Schimpf (1897 in Esslingen – 10 April 1935 in Breslau) was a German Reichsmarine and intelligence officer. During the interwar period he helped co-found, on instruction from the Reichsluftfahrtministerium, the Signals intelligence organization called the Forschungsamt (Abbr. FA); along with Hermann Göring and Gottfried Schapper. He was responsible for the organization between 1933 and 1935.

== Life ==
Schimpf was the son of the entrepreneur Ernst Schimpf and Rosa Helene Schimpf née Fink. He had a sister Elisabeth Eugenie Rosa Merz. Schimpf married Margaretha Helena Schimpf née Deffner and had four children, including actor Rolf Schimpf.

== Career ==
He entered the German Navy at a young age. He had reached the rank of Korvettenkapitän by 1933. In 1933, Schimpf came to the notice of Hermann Göring who was looking for new trained personnel for his new agency, the Forschungsamt. Schimpf had been acting as a liaison officer between the Reichsmarine Signals intelligence service, B-Dienst and the German Army signals intercept service, the Abwehr cipher bureau. At that time, Schimpf was a personal friend of Göring and a Nazi.

During his time at the Reichswehr cipher bureau, Schimpf was somewhat of a dark horse, who had organized within it a Nazi Party cell, in secret. He undertook several trips abroad to link the Abwehr cipher bureau with Italian Armed Forces, e.g. Servizio Informazioni Militare and also set up a small illicit German intercept station on a private estate near Barcelona in Spain. The intercept station was configured to intercept shipping traffic in the Mediterranean, for the Reichsmarine. It also monitored French radio stations in North Africa and southwestern France.

Schimpf has made a large number of contacts, and leading personalities with fascist organizations in Italy and Spain, which attracted Göring. Schimpf was entrusted to start the new agency. He selected 8 people, along with Gottfried Schapper, who had the original idea for the FA agency to be the new key people in the unit. All were Nazi Party members. Schimpf started the new FA agency, in March 1933.

By 30 June 1934, during the Night of the Long Knives, Schimpf had been promoted to ministerial rank (German: Ministerialrat), which ensured for himself a position of great power.

In early 1933, Reinhard Heydrich, the head of the Reich Security Main Office, who was competing with Goering's research office, tried to persuade Schimpf to work for him and Heinrich Himmler and the SS, without the knowledge of Göring, which he refused. Instead, Heydrich is supposed to have tried to extort abuse because of his numerous foreign affairs.

== Death ==
In mid-April 1935, Schimpf, who could always be reached by telephone, had gone away for an indefinite period. Rumours began to circulate, due to the conflicting information that was coming from the agency, then it was confirmed: Schimpf was dead. Several versions of his death were reported, including a car accident, that happened in Silesia, then in Berlin, then in Künigsberg. Later people were informed he committed suicide, with a dozen locations mentioned as the place of death, with one story that he killed himself with a lady friend. Deviated reports suggest that he was killed by a Czech agent.

The American historian Jonathan Petropoulos, who in his book 'Royals and the Reich: The Princes of Hesse in Nazi Germany', also discussed Schimpf's successor, Prince Christoph of Hesse, who was a SS member, and was appointed new director of the FA the day after Schimpfs' body was discovered, argues that the most likely scenario is an assassination of Schimpf as office chief (German: Amtsleiter) on behalf of Heinrich Himmler and Reinhard Heydrich, seeing the FA as an unwelcome competitor to the security service of the SS, which was under their control.

Wilhelm F. Flicke, a German World War II veteran cipher officer who was commissioned by General Erich Fellgiebel to write a history of German cryptography and cryptanalysis during the war, wrote in his book War secrets in the ether the following:

for his eavesdropping on the Reichswehr, Schimpf had recruited and organized an agent network within the organization for his work. In March 1935, one of these agents had extracted an exceedingly important document from a safe in the Reichswehr in order to turn it over to the FA for Mimeographing and inspection. The documents were needed by the Reichswehr, a few days before Easter and they couldn't be located. An investigation was initiated, with the results reported to Werner von Blomberg, who was in opposition to Hermann Göring and Schimpf, made a case before Hitler, who ended up disavowing Schimpf.

On the 10 April 1935, when Göring was getting married, Schimpf was found in Grünewald with a bullet hole in his head. There can be no doubt that Schimpf did not commit suicide but was assassinated by the Gestapo. Schimpf was a generally happy individual who was extremely fond of life, but became dangerous to both Göring and Himmler, and had to be killed.

Schimpf was cremated in a crematory in Wilmersdorf in an elaborate ceremony carried out by Göring. A large wreath was delivered with the inscription:

To my Faithful Collaborator Hans Schimpf, In Gratitude Hermann Göring

This was followed by an address by State Secretary Erhard Milch and a salute of honour.
