= Transfer (2010 film) =

- Film poster
- Directed by: Damir Lukacevic
- Written by: Elia Barceló; Gabi Blauert
- Starring: B. J. Britt; Regine Nehy
- Release dates: 23 September 2010 (Fantastic Fest); 22 September 2011 (Germany)
- Running time: 93 minutes
- Country: Germany
- Language: German

Transfer is a 2010 German science fiction/drama film directed by Damir Lukacevic. The film premiered at the 2010 Austin Fantastic Fest, and opened in German theatres on 22 September 2011.

== Cast ==
- B. J. Britt as Apolain / Hermann
- Regine Nehy as Sarah / Anna
- Ingrid Andree as Anna
- Hans-Michael Rehberg as Hermann
- Mehmet Kurtuluş as Laurin
- Eric P. Caspar as Werner
- Jeanette Hain as Dr. Menzel
- Stefan Lisewski as Dr. Menzel senior
- Zana Marjanović as Dr. Menzel's assistant
