= Research Office of the Reich Air Ministry =

Signals intelligence and cryptanalytic agency of the German Nazi Party

The Research Office of the Reich Air Ministry (German: RLM/Forschungsamt (FA), English: "Research Bureau") was the signals intelligence and cryptanalytic agency of the German Nazi Party from 1933 to 1945. Run since its inception by Luftwaffe chief Hermann Göring, the Research Bureau was a Nazi Party institution rather than an official Wehrmacht-run military signals intelligence and cryptographic agency (headed up by the German High Command's OKW/Chi).

Described as "the richest, most secret, the most Nazi, and the most influential" of all the German cryptoanalytic intelligence agencies, its existence was well known to French intelligence (Deuxième Bureau, Bureau Central de Renseignements et d'Action) via the efforts of the spy Hans-Thilo Schmidt but little known to other countries within the Allies.

The organization was described by the historian, Dr Wilhelm F. Flicke, a German veteran cipher officer, who was commissioned by General Erich Fellgiebel, to write a history of German cryptography and cryptanalysis during World War II in his book War secrets in the ether as:

calculated to give the government and the [Nazi] dominant party such far-reaching insight into the thoughts, feelings, and aspirations of the German people as had been known in all history. Compared with this plan, the informer methods of Metternich and the French Minister of Police, Fouché had been amateurish experiments.

Other names for the FA included Hermann Göring's Research Bureau and Hermann Göring cipher bureau. Its official full name in German was Forschungsamt des Reichsluftfahrt Ministerium, and in English the "Research Office of the Ministry of Aviation",(Luftwaffe)

Late in the war the FA relocated out of heavy combat zones in the north to the safety of southern Bavaria, setting up at the Kaufbeuren Air Base. Upon seizure of its abandoned files in May of 1945, the trove was taken over by TICOM, the British-U.S. effort to seize military assets after the end of World War II in Europe. The existence of the FA had been unknown by TICOM at the start of the war, and the chance discovery came as some surprise to TICOM Team 1. Upon investigation TICOM produced a large archive of documentation. (Note: TICOM's documentation archive consists of 11 primary documents, Volume I to Volume IX. These are aggregate summary documentation, each volume targeting a specific German military agency. The archive also consists of Team Reports, DF-Series, I-Series, IF-Series and M-series reports which cover various aspects of TICOM interrogation. Volume VII, which covers Göring Research Bureau, contains over 32 references to the I-Series documents, which are TICOM Intelligence reports. It also covers references to the full gamut of the other types of reports, e.g. DF-Series, and IF-Series, of which there are over 1500.: I-26 Interrogation of Oblt. Schubert (OKH/Chef HNW/Gen.d.NA) on Russian Military and Agents systems at OKM Signals School, Flensburg on 17 June 1945; I-54 Second Interrogation of five members of the RLM/Forshungsamt; I-93 Detailed Interrogation of Members of OKM 4 SKL III at Flensburg.; IF-132 DAS FORSHUNGSAMT DES REICHSLUFTFAHRTMINISTERIUMS; I-85 P.O.W. Interrogation Report on Reg. Rat Flicke, Tech, Insp. Pokojewski, Stabsintendant Hatz of OKW/Chi.; I-147 Detailed Interrogation of Members of OKM 4/SKL III at Flensburg; I-176 "Homework by 'Wachtmeister Dr. Otto Buggisch of OKH/Chi and OKW/Chi."; DF-9 Activity Report OKW/Chi 1/1/44 to 25/6/44; D-16 Translation of Annual Progress Reports by Pers ZS covering 1927, 1941, 1942)

== Emergence ==
The office of the RLM/Forschungsamt emerged with the events of the Reichstag Fire Decree. With Adolf Hitler's seizure of power by the Enabling Act of 1933, all postal, telegraph and telephone democracy was suspended. The Reichstag Fire Decree Articles 114, 115, 117, 118, 123, 124 and 153 of the Constitution of the German Reich were suspended until further notice. The article inter alia stated the secrecy of correspondence. It read:

The privacy of correspondence, postal, telegraphic and telephonic communications shall be inviolable. Exception may be only made by the Kingdom Act. See the §§ 99-101 of the Criminal Procedure Code from 1 February 1877 (RGBl. S. 253) in the version published on 4 January 1924 (RGBl. I. p.15)

By § 1 of the Reichstag Fire Decree, 28 February 1933 (RGBl. IS 83) was the Article 117 set "until further notice" overridden in conjunction with Article 48 para. 2 sentence 2.

== History ==
=== Founding ===
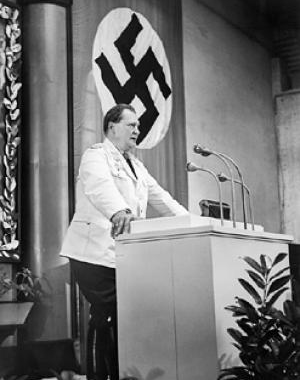
Göring addressing the Reichstag

Hermann Göring was a high ranking Nazi Party member who founded the party-run FA along with Gottfried Schapper in April 1933. Schapper had worked in the Reichswehr Ministry from 1927 to 1933 and been dissatisfied by both the scope of monitoring work and the incompetence of the methods employed there. He along with some colleagues, including Nazi, Hans Schimpf, his predecessor and a personal friend of Göring, resigned in 1933 and proposed to Göring that a separate office be created that would be free from department ties. Schimpf had previously organized a National Socialist cell within the Reichswehr without any word having leaked out about it. Schapper requested, due to both limited scope of operations and incompetence in the signals office of the Reichswehr Ministry, that the new agency be independent of the ministry. Göring consented and later stated during TICOM interrogations that he wanted an organization of his own which could handle all phases of monitoring under one central control.

Göring ensured it was camouflaged under the title Reichsluftrahrtministerium-Forschungsamt to confuse its role within the Nazi hierarchy, though in reality it was not connected to the Aviation ministry. Göring also ensured by 1935 that it was not subordinated to the Reich Air Ministry, by having its own administration, with financing directly from the Treasury by 1938, and bore no relation to the research division of the Luftwaffe technical office, or the Luftwaffe's military intercept or cryptologic unit. By then it was known as Hermann Göring's Research Bureau.

The FA was a Nazi Party civilian organization, unlike complementary organizations that existed at the time, e.g. OKW/Chi, which were military in nature. For security purposes, a small number of individuals, who were civilians, were ordered to wear German Luftwaffe uniforms. This was to ensure fruitful communication between signals intelligence.

The original unit consisted of eight men when it was established on 10 April 1933. Later, as the agency expanded, an additional 33 cryptographers, most with Nazi leanings, would be "poached" from the Supreme Command of the Armed Forces, the OKW/Chi cipher bureau, at the time when OKW/Chi itself was facing a severe personnel shortage. This caused considerable friction between the two agencies. The FA was located in an attic in Göring's Air Ministry building and later moved to a building in Behrendstrasse, Berlin. It then moved again in late 1933 to the Hotel am Knie in Charlottenburg. In 1934 and 1935 it occupied a converted housing complex called the Schiller Colonnades at 116-124 Schillerstrase. Forced to evacuate Berlin due to the heavy Allied bombing, by January 1945 most of the unit had moved to Breslau and Luebben (site of an intercept station) and Jueterbog. By March, the remnants were sent to Kaufbeuren with a small group moving to Rosenheim. By this point the FA had shrunk from around 2000 personnel down to 450 with 100 at Rosenheim. At Kaufbeuren it occupied a block of six buildings at the airfield barracks on the local airfield, secured by the 289th Combat Engineers. The FA had been disbanded and all documents burned shortly before the arrival of the American Army. A small handful of documents discovered after an extensive search provided confirmation of the existence of the FA and provided a basic outline of its organization.

=== Surveillance ===
Whereas the operational scope of the Foreign office and the Reichswehr were organized to monitor foreign communications, the Forschungsamt was designed to monitor interior communications, to collect all communications throughout Germany, and from Germany to foreign countries. The press, all printed material, the surveillance of personal letters, and the interception of conversations were undertaken. Intercept stations were distributed all over Germany, postal districts and cable junctions all had surveillance points. All telegrams sent by anybody were copied and sent to the unit.

Interception of telephone conversations of high ranking government officials, Nazi Party members and state officials were of particular importance. Gradually, an enormous spy net was created that spanned all of Germany. No officer, no official, no party functionary and no person of importance could telephone without the conversation being monitored. The FA paid particular attention to the Reichswehr personnel and commanders of military districts. A system of confidential agents was established to pass it to the FA. Surveillance of general delivery letters formed a large part of the FA.

At the outset, the FA tried to work with the Reichswehr cipher bureau and Bureau C of the Foreign Office, but the relationship quickly soured, due to the nature of the FA always to be the receiver and never the giver. Eventually, cooperation was undertaken in a purely formal manner.

=== Objectives ===
A number of objectives came into being, in the first phase of the FA operation.

- The Officer Corps of the Reichswehr, and the armed forces, in general, were put under surveillance.
- The leading figures of the Nazi Party were put under surveillance.
- The Catholic Church, the Vatican with all its institutions and leading personalities were put under surveillance.
- Anybody in Germany who had been active in political life, e.g. trade union movements, labour organizations, Freemasonry. For this objective, there was close collaboration with the Gestapo.

=== Conflict ===
The nature of the work that the FA undertook, inevitably brought the agency to the notice of Heinrich Himmler, who attempted on his own initiative to gain control of the unit and its activity. This led to an intense rivalry between Göring and Himmler. In time, Himmler succeeded in getting a stronger influence on the unit, so that gradually power in respect of the FA passed from Göring to Himmler.

=== Ernst Röhm affair ===
The first major operation of the FA was the surveillance of Ernst Röhm, the co-founder of the Sturmabteilung (SA; Storm Detachment), the Nazi Party's militia, and later was its commander. Röhm and his SA associates had been watched continuously since the end of 1933. Every telephone conversation, letter written, and conversation that Röhm had uttered was reported to the FA. For many of the associates of Röhm, microphones had been placed in their private lodgings. These were concealed in their telephones, table lamps, chandeliers, electric clocks and other locations. The evidence collected was collated and evaluated in the evaluation centre of the FA. This evidence led directly to the Night of the Long Knives, which took place from 30 June to 2 July 1934 in which 85-200 members of the SA and others were assassinated. During this action Schimpf was promoted to ministerial rank (German: Ministerialrat), which ensured for himself a position of great power.

=== Tukhachevski affair ===
The second major operation of the FA was the Mikhail Tukhachevsky case.

=== Housecleaning affair ===
The third major operation of the FA was a "housecleaning" undertaken by the FA in 1938, when significant numbers of personnel from the Ministry of War were forcefully removed. Two major figures were Werner von Blomberg and the aristocrat Baron Werner von Fritsch and a number of very high ranking officers who had to leave the field. Flicke considered this Göring's revenge, and the revenge of the FA for the death of Hans Schimpf.

During this time, the Foreign Office, which was controlled by Joachim von Ribbentrop, was wired with microphones without any ministry official noticing.

=== Austrian affair ===
The FA played a very important role in the intercepting communications of the government of the Federal State of Austria before the Anschluss occupation in March 1938. A special subsection in the FA was formed, and subsequently the entire communications system of Austria was intercepted. They were increasingly aided in their operation by sympathetic Austrian officials. All telephone conversations carried out in Austrian ministries, the content of all telegrams sent abroad, and many important documents were sent to the Forschungsamt. The Austrian officials even went as far as to provide all the cryptographic systems used by the Foreign Office in Vienna, by the Austrian Armed Forces and by the Austrian Police. The Austrian telephone and telegraph cables leading through the Berchtesgaden areas were tapped by the FA.

=== Himmler takeover ===
By 20 July 1944, Heinrich Himmler had firmly gained control over the FA.

=== TICOM ===
TICOM was the operation by the United States to seize military assets after the end of World War II in Europe. The existence of Göring's Research Bureau was unknown by TICOM at the start of the war, which came as some surprise when papers were discovered by TICOM Team 1 at the Kaufbeuren Air Base indicating it was the FA's final location after fleeing there from heavy combat zones in the north.

== Key personnel ==
Hermann Göring was the most important individual at the FA. He was a German politician, military leader, and leading member of the Nazi Party (NSDAP).

Director Hans Schimpf was the first head of the FA between 10 April 1933 and 10 April 1935. A former Corvette captain (Korvettenkapitän), he was a liaison officer between the Abwehr and the navy department, Reichsmarine/B-Dienst, at the Defence Ministry.

Director Christoph Prinz von Hessen was a German SS officer who managed the agency between 10 April 1935 and 12 October 1943. He was the son of Prince Frederick Charles of Hesse and Princess Margaret of Prussia, a member of one of the oldest traceable families in Christendom (Charlemagne) and a direct relation to the British royal family. He was killed in an airplane accident in Italy on 7 October 1943. Christoph's SS membership and subsequent appointment to the Forschungsamt pointed to a close relationship between the unit and the Sicherheitsdienst (Security Service; SD), which was the SS branch that served as the intelligence gathering and ideological watchdog of the Nazi Party.

Director Gottfried Schapper, an extreme anti semitic, was also a German SS officer who held the rank of Hauptsturmführer, and managed the agency between 12 October 1943 and the end of the war on 8 May 1945. Schapper had been a soldier in World War I and from 1916 to 1917 had been director of the cryptographic offices in the Central Command of the German Army. He had worked in the Reichswehr Ministry from 1927 onwards, becoming instrumental in bringing the scattered services at the ministry under a central organization, and eventually becoming its head in 1933. Having known Göring from the First World War, he approached Göring, along with Schimpf and Hesse, to create the new agency. It was Schapper who came up with the name of the agency, Forschungsamt. In May 1945 he was arrested near Rosenheim by TICOM agents and taken to Salzburg and later Augsburg to be interrogated.

== Organization ==
The FA was organized into six main sections or departments (Hauptabteilung) as follows:

- Principal Department I: Administration. The department was the administrative HQ for the unit, and dealt with organization, administration and personnel. Commanded by Principal Specialist (German: Ministerialrat) Bergeren. The section had 50 people split into two subsections.

- Section 1: Commanded by Senior Specialist (German: Oberregierungsrat) (Abbr. ORR) Rosenhan, it was responsible for correspondence, basic personnel recruitment and budgets. This included electric eye passes, identification passes, guard rotas, work rotas, air raid precautions and soap rations.

- Section 2: Commanded by Senior Specialist (German: Oberregierungsrat) Kunsemueller, it was responsible for administration.

- Principal Department II: Personnel. Commanded by Senior Specialist Kempe. The department was responsible for personnel records and consisted of 80 to 100 men.
- Principal Department III: Intercept. Commanded by Senior Specialist Breuer. The department was responsible for intercept, including the actual intercept stations and initial sorting of intercepted messages. It consisted of over 200 personnel and two sections.

- Section 4: Commanded by Specialist Popp, it was responsible for all FA intercepts. This included intercept control, determination of priorities, locations of stations, and actual administration of the intercept personnel.

- Section 5: Commanded by Dr. Henke, the unit worked as a message center for all intercepts and distributing it to Main Section IV or Main Section V. No traffic analysis was undertaken, only sorted by language and traffic type. Non encrypted messages, e.g. private and commercial messages, press articles, telephone monitoring intercepts were sent direct to Main Section V. Code and cipher text was sorted as to type, e.g. military, diplomatic or commercial. Military intercepts were passed to OKW/Chi for decrypting. Diplomatic traffic would be shared amongst agencies. Any material which was to be worked on by the FA was automatically passed to Department IV.

- Principal Department IV: Codes and Ciphers. Consisting of 180 men, it was commanded by Leading Minister (German: Ministerialdirigent) Georg Schroeder. The department was responsible for the cryptanalysis of all foreign, i.e. enemy signals.

- Section 6: Research. Commanded by an officer named Paetzel, it came into existence in 1944 and had about 40 personnel working in the unit. The nature of the section was one of research on new systems, work specifically that other sections could not work on. They dealt with diplomatic traffic of America, England, Japan, Free France, Spain, and Spanish America.

- Section 7: Overseas and Southwest. Commanded by Senior Specialist Weachter and consisted of between 60 and 70 personnel. Their work included USA, England, Latin America, Spain, Portugal, Turkey, Egypt and the Far East. Senior Specialist Weachter was an expert on American systems. Dr. Erfurt was the only Japanese translator in this unit.

- Section 8: West and South. Commanded by Senior Specialist Schulze, it was composed of 30 to 40 people. They worked on France, Belgium, Switzerland, Netherlands, Romania and Italian ciphers.

- Section 9: East, Southeast, Middle and North. Commanded by Senior Specialist Wenzel. The number of personnel varies, depending on TICOM interrogation reports, but was supposed between 45 and 70.

- Principal Department V: Evaluation. Commanded by Principal Specialist (German: Ministerialrat) Walter Seifert, who commanded around 400 people, which was the biggest number of people for the bureau. Seifert stated of the department:

The object of the department was the production of a purely objective and scientific picture of the world wide political and commercial situation.

- Section 10: Information Dissemination. Commanded by Specialist (German: regierungsrat) Dr Mews. Serving as a library and archive, containing voluminous files of practically every type of information from most countries. This included text books, maps, telephone directories, city plans, newspapers and periodicals. Essentially this section provided the material needed to evaluate and add context to decrypted messages. The staff also included four or five translators.

- Section 11: Foreign Policy Evaluation under Senior Specialist Dr Kurzbach.

- Section 12: Economic Evaluation. Commanded by acting head Brieschke.

- Section 13: Internal Affairs Evaluation. Commanded by Specialist Rentschler, the section employed about 80 people in 1944 while in Berlin.

- Principal Department VI: Technical. Commanded by Senior Specialist Dipl. Ing. Stabenow.

- Section 14: Development of own cipher machinery.

- Section 15: Comparison and evaluation of captured Machinery.

== Operations ==
=== Linguistic output ===
The final output of the FA was Brown Reports or Brown Sheets (Braune Meldungen or Braunblätter). Recipients of these reports included Chief of the Armed Forces Wilhelm Keitel, Chief of Operations Alfred Jodl, Göring, Foreign Minister Ribbentrop, Grand Admiral Karl Donitz and Hitler.

In cases where special reports were created, these had a much shorter distribution list, specifically only Göring and Hitler. Information that would be considered special, for example, were the Berlin-Rome telephone conversations between Italian Prime Minister Benito Mussolini and Italian Foreign Minister Galeazzo Ciano.

Hitler's view on the FA reports were that they were extremely reliable, with the material presented to Hitler verbatim. Linguists were given orders not to make guesses if there were gaps, but to fill them with rows of dots. A special courier section was used that traveled in special cars, not railway cars, with dispatch boxes set up for which only Hitler, Ribbentrop and Göring possessed the keys. Once read, reports were returned, and sometimes due to mixups in sheet numbering or missing sheets due to human error, specific sheets would be re-requested.

=== Primary Distribution list ===
The government agencies on the distribution list for daily brownsheets of the RLM/Forschungsamt were:

- Reichswirtschaftsministerium - Ministry of Domestic Economy.
- Reichsfinanzministerium - Finance Ministry.
- Reichspropagandaministerium - Propaganda Ministry.
- Auswärtiges Amt - Foreign Ministry.
- Buero Ribbentrop - Private Intelligence Service of the Foreign Ministry.
- Ministerium Speer - Armament Ministry.
- RSHA - Headquarters for the security police, security services, criminal police and Einsatzgruppen.
- Oberkommando der Wehrmacht - German Military High Command.

=== Interception ===
The FA ran its own intercept stations. To meet its operational requirements, the FA used 5 different station types, and were called Research Posts (Forschungsstellen). The stations were categorized as follows:

- A Stations - Telephone Intercept
- B Stations - Wireless Intercept
- C Stations - Radio Broadcast Monitoring
- D Stations - Teletype and Telegraph Intercept
- F Stations - Mail Censorship

The A stations were positioned throughout Germany and later in German-occupied countries. These stations were equipped with one of two interceptor switchboards, which enabled the operator to tap into any conversation. The taping was done at the post office with tap lines routed into the station. Included in each switchboard was a Wire recording recorder. The operations of the A stations changed at the start of the war. Prior to September 1939, the intercept stations acted in a civilian function, reporting on the many international lines coming into Germany. Although the locations of most A stations are not available from TICOM documentation, it is known that Berlin had a large A station, which was used to tap the conversations of the diplomatic corps. It had a staff of around 100 people, including 50 to 60 intercept personnel. After the war, these operations ceased, with new operations largely concerned with war production bottlenecks, domestic affairs and attitudes of large industries.

B stations were usually positioned outside of towns in points of good wireless reception. Radio messages were intercepted by short wave receivers and then relayed in written form to the FA headquarters. After the war, B stations became increasingly important with the end of telephone conversations between Germany and other nations with the loss of foreign information.

Only one C station existed, which performed the pure monitoring service of public broadcasts from other countries.

The 3 D stations were located in Berlin, Vienna and Dortmund, which were the chief centres of cablegrams leaving Germany. The D stations operations were also greatly diminished after the start of the war.

The F stations were created after Germany was at war, were not extensive in operation. Censorship offices were operated by OKW and later by RSHA. The F station consisted of small groups attached to these censorship posts. It was known that the FA was concerned with postal censorship

In addition to the stations operating in Germany, the FA setup operational units in occupied countries. In the Netherlands and Poland, A stations were installed with advancing troops. In Vienna, for example, the A station was functioning two days after the occupation. Mobile units were also used during the Polish campaign, but were reported to be largely unsuccessful chiefly because of lack of cooperation with the German Army.

Specialist Oden Hoeckley, head of Section 15 of the FA, who had been employed by Siemens and Halske, and been classmates of various members of WA Pruef 7 (Waffenamt), and also collaborated on the design of the T53e (Siemens and Halske T52) teleprinter, stated the following:

There were 100 to 150 sets at the Templin and Luebben station and from 20 to 30 at Cologne, Konstanz, Eutin, and Gols. Traffic was forwarded by cipher teleprinter, i.e. the T52c, T52d or T52e. The FA did not develop its own intercept equipment, preferring to use the Army, the Reichspost or industry equipment.

=== Liaison ===
==== Liaison with OKW/CHI ====
Liaison between the OKW/Chi and the FA was known to exist A special liaison officer (German:Verbindungsmann), Dr E. Klautachke, was assigned to the Supreme Command of the Armed Forces. The form of this liaison took the form of passing intelligence to the Supreme Command and answering specific questions. Dr Klautachke stated that he did not concern himself with cryptologic matters and stated that liaison regarding these matters did not exist. Considerable ill feeling existed between the FA and OKW/Chi. Wilhelm Fenner in his homework for "TICOM" stated that friction existed between the FA and OKW/Chi started when 33 people went over from Chi to the FA. Personnel friction between Fenner and Selchow existed as well. The question of competence could be used as a lever, as Hitler had assigned the working of diplomatic messages to the FA exclusively, which OKW/Chi had decided that it was not going to let that work move to the FA. Fenner considered the FA had overreached its competence, as the continual requests for help for decipherment aid by the FA to the Pers Z S showed that the FA was not able to supply what was desired. Indeed, the GA tried to get aid from Chi thus overlooking its claim that the OKW/Chi was not competent. Indeed, the OKW/Chi understood neither the organization nor the operations of the FA. The FA sent its traffic to Pers Z S and Chi but to Chi only what the FA saw fit to send, and the OKW/Chi would sometimes receive material from Pers Z S, which was not supplied direct. However it was clear that intercepted traffic was still exchanged between the two units. Indeed, up to 30% of all the intercept traffic received by OKW/Chi came from the FA Fenner stated he had no use for the FA and considered it a private toy of Göring, for which it has no excuse except to further inflate Göring's vanity.

Attempts were made by the FA to take over the monitoring function for the OKW/Chi which was vigorously resisted and in view of the types of monitoring which the FA conducted, which was similar to the FA requirements, would suggest the duplication of monitoring activities as unnecessary. Dr. Walther Fricke, a leading cryptographer of the OKW/Chi, who stated that he knew nothing of the FA until some of them came to Schloss Glucksburg, and who stated that they were a big names with nothing behind them, on being told that the FA employed over 2000 personnel, his comments were:

For their deciphering they should have needed a handful. They must have had other work to do, but what the devil could they have been doing with 2000 people?

==== Liaison with General der Nachrichtenaufklärung ====
As regards General der Nachrichtenaufklärung (Abbr. GDNA), the signals intelligence office of the Oberkommando des Heeres, it was evident that greater liaison took place. This liaison took the form of actual division of tasks and sharing of personnel information. Liaison was also conducted over the IBM developments (Hollerith machines). One of the most important achievements of the FA which resulted from this cooperation and was revealed by Dr Otto Buggisch, one of the leading cryptanalyst of Inspektorate 7. Buggisch reported that the FA was able to read Russian Teletype traffic. Buggisch stated that the FA had some success in reconstructing a Russian Teletype machine in 1943 and recognized it had certain similarities in design with the German SZ40. After a short time, the Soviets changed the design. The FA communicated its results to Inspektorate 7 and were given a report on the solution of a German cipher teleprinter (the model unknown). Buggisch stated this was one of the very rare cases where the FA and Insp. 7/VI exchanged results. Other areas of liaison were known to exist. Insp. 7/VI took the lead amongst German cipher agencies in the use of IBM Hollerith machinery to conduct cryptologic work. This machinery was made available to other agencies. Wilhelm Tranow of the B-Dienst stated:

About March 1942 we paid a visit, in conjunction with the Luftwaffe and the FA, to the OKH Hollerith department in Victoriastrasse, Berlin.

==== Liaison with OKL-Stelle ====
The position of the FA and the OKL-Stelle, the cipher bureau for high command of the Luftwaffe under Göring, should have facilitated an exchange of information between them. TICOM interrogation found no ill feeling between the FA and OKL-Stelle indicates that was not the case. OKL-Stelle was concerned with air traffic ciphers, so a functional division did exist between the two agencies. However, the FA did supply diplomatic and general intelligence to OKL-Stelle. Lt. Colonel Friederich, Chief of Division III of OKL-Stelle stated:

He did not work with them [the RLM/FA] except to the extent that Chief Cryptanalyst Ferdinand Voegele, Chief of Section E, sometimes met with cryptanalysts from this and other agencies to discuss general problems. The FA furnished the Luftwaffe with appropriate traffic on occasion. We asked what was the function of the FA. He said its purpose was really hidden from the services, who were not allowed entry to the establishment. Only Voegele had any contact with them and that only with the cryptanalysts.

Friederich knew that it was a political organization, not military. When it worked on foreign systems, it was only on traffic in the rear.

==== Liaison with B-Dienst ====
Liaison between the FA and the Signal Intelligence Agency of the Navy High Command (B-Dienst) was documented in B-Dienst Yearly Progress reports prepared by the navy and by interrogation of B-Dienst Chief Cryptologist Wilhelm Tranow. Cooperation took the form of working on the cracking of the British Inter Departmental Cipher. Tranow stated in interview:

I informed the FA, the OKW/Chi and the GAF [Luftwaffe] of the existence of this cipher in 1940 and the FA and the Navy (B-Dienst) worked on it. The OKW/Chi and the GAF restricted themselves rather to reviving the cypher data when worked out. The GAF did a little work on it, however, and passed any recovered keys on to us. The cypher went out of use in December 1942. This was the last of it. I believe it was used occasionally at a few stations. I stopped work on it [around] December 1942. The FA continued to send us occasional results. In particular these consisted again and again of information about our U-boat losses and British shipping losses etc.

According to Tranow, 2 to 3% of all intercept traffic came from the FA.

==== Liaison with AA/Pers Z S ====
The status of the liaison between the FA and the AA/Pers Z, the cipher department of the Foreign Office (Germany) was more fully understood by TICOM. Joachim von Ribbentrop, the foreign minister of Nazi Germany stated that Minister (Gesandter I Kl.) Selchow, the director of the AA/Pers SZ worked closely with the FA. The Liaison Officer was Dr Gerstmeyer. TICOM Team 1 first learned the existence of the FA from the foreign office cryptanalysts, who knew the names of many of the section heads in Department IV in which their work was related The Yearly Report for 1942 from AA/Per Z inter alia, reveals an exchange of code book recoveries. The name of Senior Specialist Waechter of the FA appears in the Yearly Report and the names of other FA personnel occur in the code books stored in the AA/Per Z archives. From this evidence it is clear that technical cryptanalyst liaison existed between the FA and the AA/Per Z.

== Cryptanalysis successes by country ==
Only eighty odd references to different types of intercept traffic were known to exist from TICOM interrogations, and the details surrounding these references were vague, unlike the detail provided, for example, by the Signal Intelligence Agency of the German Foreign Office, Pers Z S, the Signal Intelligence Agency of the Supreme Command of the Armed Forces, OKW/Chi or the Department of the German Naval Intelligence Service, B-Dienst when TICOM interrogations turned to liaison between the agencies, when considerable more detail was revealed. There was considerable evidence that the FA possessed copies of a surprising number of code books, although there is no indication in TICOM interrogation documentation, exactly how the FA procured the code books.

Senior Specialist Dr Martin Paetzel, who was responsible for Section 5 and alternate head of Main Section IV of the FA, was responsible for providing most of the intelligence regarding which ciphers were broken and worked on by the FA. Other sources included Georg Schroeder, responsible for Department IV, Erwin Rentschler, head of section 13 of the FA, Wilhelm Tranow, lead cryptanalyst and director of B-Dienst, Dr Kurt Sauerbier who was responsible for sub-section C of Section 9 of the FA. The Russian section is the longest, as Russia ciphers was what concerned TICOM the most.

Cryptanalysis successes by country
Country Name, or System	Notes on compromised Cyphers.
United States	Dr Paetzel stated that four main systems were worked on, that he knew of. A Strip system, a Five Figure Systems with Mono-alphabetic and Bigram Substitution, a State Department diplomatic code and joint American and British low grade cypher. Dr Paetzel stated that the FA attempted a strip system intermittently but not currently. We finally gave it up as it took too many personnel. The system employed 30 of a matrix of 50 strips in a setting. The ability of the FA to read this cypher may have been due to liaison with Pers Z S although there is no indication that such is the case. The Five Figure cypher with Mono-alphabetic and Bigram Substitution was not solved currently as they only read back material several months to a year old. The tables changed within the message and this change was shown by an Indicator. The successor to this cypher was not broken as there was no indicator in the middle of the message to show where the tables changed. The intercepted message traffic of Leland B. Harrison, the United States diplomat and Chargé d'affaires, in Bern, Switzerland were mentioned by Alfred Jodl and Hermann Göring as Signals Intelligence work completed by the FA, and by cryptanalysts of several agencies. These messages were sent in the compromised Brown Code and Erwin Rentschler, head of section 13 of the FA, stated that they had been read up until quite recently Martin Paetzel also referred to FA success with commercial messages between the United States and Britain, some of these which concerned shipping movements, e.g. convoy and individual ships, but it was known that the B-Dienst, the Department of the German Naval Intelligence Service, led by Wilhelm Tranow passed commercial messages supplied decrypted by the Kriegsmarine to the FA.
Belgium	Dr Paetzel stated that Belgium used one book with and without substitution encipherment. It was read in both cases.
United Kingdom	Erwin Rentschler provided information of British Consular, i.e. diplomatic cyphers. Rentschler stated that diplomatic intercepts from the British Consulate in Cairo was cryptanalysed and Alfred Jodl recalled under interrogation that important information was gained from this source. In the Pers Z S Yearly Report for 1942, within the British Empire Section, there is reference to a statement by Senior Specialist Weachter of a fruitless attempt on a Tenerife-Las Palmas Consular Code. He also reported that a system used between Tenerife and Las Palmas has been worked on by the FA in February 1943, which had proved to be the case of a transposed plain text. Georg Schroeder stated that Hitler had delayed his discussions with the British Prime Minister Neville Chamberlain, during the Bad Godesberg Conference in Bad Godesberg in 1938, for several hours, while a message sent to London by the Prime Minister could be decoded. Walter Seifert, head of main Section V, stated that work on British Diplomatic cipher systems was useless and no successes were obtained, There was an occasional physical compromise. We captured clear text and a basic book in Norway but had no success with them cryptographically. (Operation_Stratford). Rentschler stated that second, third and fourth grade British Diplomatic Codes could be read. Wilhem Tranow of B-Dienst stated of the British Interdepartmental Cipher (B-Dienst#Table of attempted cyphers solutions) From the middle of 1942, results fell off because of less material. However, we continued to decipher a very good percentage of what material came in. The military situation had now changed. Russia had entered the war. Traffic with Ankara and Stockholm was very heavy but actual Navy traffic dropped considerably. I informed the FA, the OKW/Chi and the Signals Intelligence Agency of the Luftwaffe (GAF) of the existence of this cipher in 1940 and the FA and the Navy (B-Dienst) worked on it. The OKW and the GAF restricted themselves rather to receiving the cypher data when worked out. The GAF did a little work on it, and passed any recovered keys to us. The cypher went out of force in December 1942. That was the last of it. I believe it was afterwards still used occasionally at a few stations. I stopped work on it at B-Dienst about the middle or end of 1942. The FA continued to send occasional results. In particular, these consisted again and again of information about our U-boat losses and British shipping losses. This was the first months of 1943, until the summer of that year. Ferdinand Voegele, who was chief of Section E of Chi-Stelle OB.d.L (OKL/LN Abt. 350), and widely considered an expert cryptanalyst, and who was first to work on the Interdepartmental cipher, stated that there was an exchange of recyphering book results for the Interdepartmental Cipher with OKW, OKM (General der Nachrichtenaufklärung), and the FA in 1940 up to 1942 The British Empire section of the Pers Z S Yearly Report for 1942 because of traffic received was slight. Miss Ursula Hagen, the head of the Pers Z S English desk stated, there was no liaison with the FA except on the subject of the Interdepartmental Cipher As regards Code B-30, (a Pers Z S classification), the British Empire Section of the Pers Z S Yearly Report from 1942 refers to FA liaison in that year: In February 1942, at the request of ORR Waechter of the FA, an attempt was made to establish contact with the FA, which however did not go beyond a general exchange of ideas. The only concrete results were that the FA placed at out disposal a list of approximately 50 "B-30" recovered groups. As regards the Bank of England Code, Kurt Sauerbier states that the cipher was broken in 1941. Sauerbier stated that the pages of the plain text were shuffled and an encipherment added, and the solution was achieved by the use of cribs, and common form messages, of which the best was a statement of the daily exchange rates between various countries. The encipherment was as follows: the basic system was a bigram substitution from a table, different for each link and changing each three months. The text was divided into segments or three or four groups, and the plain text bigrams for encipherment prearranged pairs, as 1 and 15, 2 and 14, 6 and 10 and so on. Very long depths and near depths were produced on closely similar number values, and this was the entry. The whole cryptanalysis effort took about six months, starting with 1942-1943 traffic and working until 1944. The interception of the traffic was not systematically read at any time, and Saurbier did not believe more than 50% of all the traffic was read as a result of the cipher solution.
Bulgaria	Dr Martin Paetzel stated that Bulgarian systems were basically a few 5-digit codes with repaginations or relineations. A 1940 report from the Pers Z S Bulgarian Group, by Dr Hans-Heidrun Karstien, mentions that the FA had furnished them with Mimeographs of two Bulgarian ciphers. TICOM was in possession of a list of Bulgarian material in possession at the FA. The list contained some twenty entries, including Dictionaries and Work Books, and was marked To be Destroyed.
China	Chinese traffic was worked on at one time, according to Dr Paetzel, but not towards the end. Some progress was made but nothing was read.
Clandestine Traffic	Clandestine traffic of detained persons, according to Kurt Sauerbier, was mostly scattered messages in individual systems, which were rarely solved
Czechoslovakia	The Skoda Commercial Code, according to Sauerbier, this code was one of the major undertakings in the prewar FA, as part of preinvasion planning. The code was used by the Škoda Company for secure communications between Skoda to Iran and Iraq in 1935. It was concerned almost entirely with bridge building projects. TICOM Document 240 Item 42 is a cover letter for Czech Messages to be sent to the Gestapo, the Nazi state police (German: Staatspolizeileitstelle) in Prague.
Denmark	Kurt Sauerbier stated that about 50% of the Danish Diplomatic Code traffic was read up until 1940. Nothing was solved thereafter except an occasional message in the code on some minor commercial matter.
Ethiopia	Dr Paetzel stated that the FA had done a little work on an Ethiopian Code
Finland	The FA at one time had cribs for a Finnish Hagelin [machine cipher (Boris Hagelin) and were able to cryptanalyse the machine cypher. He subsequently stated that it was possible to break the Finnish Hagelin, if they had 4,000 letters or more of the encrypted text.
France	There is an indication that a high level French code was broken. Göring stated that the ciphers French Foreign Office at the Quai d'Orsay had been obtained, but did not give the date or details of the story. An Associated Press story, based on Göring's personal copy of his own telephone conversations taken at the time of the Anschluss, indicates that the ciphers mentioned may well have been a very high grade system. Göring was reasonably guarded in his telephone conversations and the newspaper translation is not perfectly translated. The conversations reveal Göring phoning Hitler, in Austria, to celebrate the triumph of the Anschluss, and that no action by France was to be feared because England had refused to back her in a display of force. Göring assured Hitler that the information from the Brown Reports was taken from a decoded telegram of the French Foreign Office. The mention of the Brown Reports indicate that the FA was involved. Pers Z S referred to work in 1941 on a French code which was a 10,000 group figure code designated as code 19. The first solution was said to have been achieved by the FA using captured tables, which were later turned over to Pers Z S for use. Dr Brandes, the head of the French-Belgian-Swiss section in Dr. Adolf Paschke Linguistics and Cryptanalytics section, stated that he was responsible for liaison with the FA for the group. According to Walter Seifert, the FA has success with all French unenciphered books (This was particularly productive because the French used a large number of these books). Rentschler stated that the easiest French cipher system to break of all those worked on by the FA was the Vichy France code. It is worth noting that Charles de Gaulle used Allied codes and consequently his diplomatic traffic is not read. The Vichy changed its codes only about every four weeks [This statement of Rentschler appears contradictory. It would be expected that Vichy codes would be available to Germany without necessity of cryptanalysis, and the reference to "captured tables" in the paragraph above would support this belief. However, it may be that the FA and the Pers Z S did not receive diplomatic codes or ciphers through the German Armistice Commission which may not have been interested in such liaison.
Germany	Sauerbier stated that during the interwar period he was concerned almost entirely with commercial codes in the German language. This involved the traffic of German firms to foreign countries during the Four Year Plan.
Greece	Dr Paetzel stated that just two Greek codes were read.
Hagelin Machines	Hagelin Machines were machine based ciphers that were built by Boris Hagelin. Paetzel stated that Hagelin messages were never broken because they were never long enough. He estimated that perhaps 5000 letters would be enough. However, in a second interrogation he contradicted himself in connection with Finnish and Swedish systems where he stated that cribs has been secured and the Hagelin read. He also stated that it could be read with 4000 letters.
Hungary	Dr Paetzel said that the Hungarians used an additive changing with the message, which was not solved.
Intabank	Dr Kurt Sauerbier described a solution in 1944 of the code used by Intabank, the Bank for International Settlements at Basel, Switzerland, as a major effort of the section. The cipher used was an old Bank of England book code, which had been solved in 1941. The pages of the cipher book had been shuffled and an encipherment added but solution was achieved via the use of cribs and common form messages, of which the best was a statement of the daily exchange rates between various countries. The details of the encipherment process was as follows: the basic system was bigram substitution from a table different for each link and changing each three months. The text was divided into segments of three or four groups, then the plain text bigrams for encipherment were prearranged pairs as 1 and 15, 2 and 16, 6 and 10, and so on. Very long depths and near depths were produced on closely similar number values and this was the entry. The whole solution took six months, starting at 1942-43 and working up to 1944. The interception of the traffic was not systematically read at any time, and Saurbier did not believe more than 50% of all the traffic was read as a result of the cipher solution.
Eire, Ireland	Dr Paetzel said that the FA Section 7 worked on Irish enciphered codes with considerable success up to the end of World War II. Pers Z S prisoners, who were interrogated, referred to the Government Telegraph Code which was used by the Irish government for diplomatic communications, which was an encipherment by two substitution alphabets. The FA solved the keys used on the Berlin and Madrid links in 1943. Pers Z S took over the keys for the FA in 1944.
Italy	Erwin Rentschler claimed some success on high grade Italian diplomatic systems. The Annual Report of the Italian desk of Pers Z S for 1940 indicated a fairly extensive Pers Z S - FA cooperation on Italian systems. Message intercepts of the FA was made available to the Foreign Office and from the 1939-1940 period, there was regular exchange of encipherment tables. In September 1940, and in November 1940 there was a mutual exchange of book groups on two ciphers AR 38 and RA 1. It is worth noting that: From 1935 until late 1942, with lapses as new code books were introduced, Pers Z S read all Italian diplomatic codes.
Japan	Rentschler claimed that the FA had some success with Japanese diplomatic ciphers. Hermann Göring, remembered that information was obtained from the Japanese ambassador in Berlin, either Saburō Kurusu or Hiroshi Ōshima, while he was reporting home. Dr Paetzel described a Japanese main diplomatic system which employed a code book enciphered by a combination of transposition and Raster. They were successful with this up until the last phase of the war. Dr Paetzel also mentioned a transposition cipher with nulls over a two and four letter code, which had a complicated Indicator system. It was worked on in the middle of 1943 and again in January 1945, close to the ending of World War II and was believed to be the same system. Japanese system was broken in 1941–1942, which was thought to be a machine system although their solution was not mechanical but employed simple paper strips.
Mexico and Latin America	Paetzel stated that the FA read all Mexican traffic and some smaller countries like Costa Rica, Paraguay and Venezuela. They were usually periodic substitution ciphers but Mexico has proper codes.
Yugoslavia	The FA has success with Yugoslavian traffic which he thinks was related to the communications of Draja Mihailovitch. It was a 5-digit or 5-alpha cipher with dinome substitution of the corresponding position of pairs of code groups.
Norway	Kurt Sauerbier stated that an unenciphered five letter code was read completely up until 1940. Nothing was read after the Norwegian Campaign when the Norwegian government moved to London.
Poland	The FA was interested in the Polish Diplomatic code. This operated between London and Washington, Bern, Cairo and Jerusalem. In describing the work of Section 9 of the FA, Kurt Sauerbier only recalled the solution of a Polish diplomatic code in 1940–1941. This used an additive of a specific length, which after 1943 became too long to produce depths. After that date it was not solved. [Sauerbier's interrogator noted that it sounded more like the Polish Home office system rather than the Foreign Office system]. The Situation report of the Pers Z S Polish desk dated 1 January 1940 revealed that at the time both the FA and the Pers Z S were working on a secondary consular system and that Pers Z S received Polish intercepts from the GA. Seifert remembered traffic from Polish Agents in Czechoslovakia. Paetzel described these systems as numerous aperiodic systems employing many cover names but was unable, or perhaps unwilling to provide the information about the key, Lieutenant (German: Ober leutnant) Schubert, who was responsible for work on Agent Systems on the Eastern Front for the Signal Intelligence Agency of the Army High Command (OKH/In 7/VI) stated that Senior Specialist Wenzel of the section 9 of the FA, was an expert on Polish Resistance Movement traffic although he does not know if any of this traffic had been read by the FA.
Portugal	Portuguese systems were considered conservative. They use a 5-digit code plus substitution. It was considered very, very simple.
Russia	Sauerbier mentions [that] a few people who were engaged in a fruitless attack on Russian diplomatic traffic This attack culminated in the belief that the system was a code with a non-repeating additive. Walter Seifert details work by the FA on economic traffic passing between various points in Russia. Our greatest success was obtained on internal Russian traffic which enabled us to discover various bottlenecks in the Russian supply organization Dr Paetzel stated that this traffic totaled several hundred messages a day and was clear text mixed with cover names and was used by industrial plants, foundries and so on. The mathematician, Dr Otto Buggisch, a specialist at both the Signal Intelligence Agency of the Supreme Command of the Armed Forces, and at the Signal Intelligence Agency of the Army High Command, heard; in 1943 that the FA has claimed some success on a Russian teletype machine and had reconstructed the machine. It was a machine with a very long cycle, being not prime, but the product of several smaller cycles like the SZ 42 Buggisch did not know the cycle of all the individual wheels or any other details. He heard this from Dr S. Doering. Mathematician of Inspectorate 7/VI (Army) and he General der Nachrichtenaufklärung who was then doing his research on the T-52 but liaison with the FA was bad anyway (Colonel Mettig was particularly opposed to the SS taint) and the next time Buggisch heard was that the traffic has stopped. Buggisch remembered only that the cycle of one of the wheels was 37; the other he thought varied widely, from 30 to 80. Buggisch was again questioned about this teletype machine success of the GA on what specifically were the results of the FA mentioned in connection with the Russian cipher teleprinter and answered in written [TICOM] homework (a document typed up by the interrogated to illustrate a process to TICOM) : the FA had analysed a Russian cipher teleprinter system in 1943 and recognized that it must have been based on a machine having certain similarities with the German SZ 40. The FA then communicated its result to my unit and were given as a kind of recompense a report on the solution of a German cipher teleprinter. This was a very rare case where the FA and Inspectorate 7/VI exchanged results. Dr Buggisch stated he did not study the FA results at the time, as he was not responsible for work on cipher teleprinters. At all events, the Russian machine (just as in the German types SZ 40, SZ 42 but in contrast to the T52, versions a, b, c and d) gave on 32 different substitution alphabets, the successes of which became periodic only after an astronomically large number of steps. This succession was given by a system of pin wheels, the peripheries of which were prime to each other at an estimate lay between 30 and 90. In any case there was no complicated mutual influence of the pin wheels on each other (as for example in the T-52d). Kurt Sauerbier, who worked as a cryptanalyst on Agent Traffic originating in Russian Agent System in section 9c. He was approached by the Ordnungspolizei, the Nazi police force, commonly called the Orpo, for a request for cryptographic advice on the systems used by the Russian agents. Sauerbier wrote a lengthy paper on the type of systems involved. They gave him copies of systems, that were captured with agents, which these he grouped by category. Analysis was limited almost entirely to a study of characteristics and recognition signals with a view to advising on the possibility of a (German: Gegenspiel) agent backlash [A counter game employing the agent after capture or pretending to be the agent, or the agent becoming a double agent]. This work was done of Sauerbier's own time. Wenzel, his chief, opposed his involvement in the affair, but what started as a request, became official policy, directed at Sauerbier. It was a one mans job entirely, with an occasional file clerk. He estimated up to 1500 different keys passed through his hands, mostly substitution systems, mostly in Russian but many in German. Of these only 4 or 5 were solved without a completely captured key. One of the proudest was the use of an ordinary book left behind by an agent to solve his traffic. Sauerbier was never concerned with radio procedure, but purely with the cipher used. He was able to give advice on the probable group to which an agent belonged and could consult his records for an account of the success or failure of a particular technique of Gegenspiel against this group. A possible additional example of FA success against the Russians was chanced upon after the completion of the Volume 7 TICOM documentation and has been asserted here into the TICOM doc without evaluation. While going through an inventory of various boxes of material recovered by TICOM from Pers Z S, the following item was noted:Box 13, item 18. Green folding box containing: a) Pink folder marked 'Russisches Beutematerial (Ueber FA)' containing, (1) Photostats (mimeographs) of Russian book of additive tables (including instructions for use), date 1940. (2) Some photostats of 5-figure Russian traffic. (3) Blue folder containing photostats of Instruktion für die Behörden des NKWD zur Führung der Chiffre-Arbeit. (Instructions for the authorities of the NKVD to conduct the cipher work).
Scandinavia	Dr Mueller of Pers Z S stated that he had some unofficial liaison with the people in the FA who were working on Scandinavian ciphers but specified no date for the collaboration.
Spain	Paetzel described a system of additives differing according to traffic link. Each link has 10 tables, with 100 4-digit groups on each table. The indications (unenciphered) was the serial number and came in second or third place. Paetzel state that this was the most recent thing he had worked on personally. The Pers Z S Yearly Report for 1942 mentions a Spanish 04 code which was not worked on by Pers Z S due to a lack of traffic. The FA worked on it and believed it was a machine cipher system. It was a 4-digit code, with 04 as the indicator.
Sweden	Erwin Rentschler stated categorically that there was no success with Swedish systems, Kurt Sauerbier detailed a 4 or 5-digit non-alphabetic Swedish Consular code, which was especially used on the link between Stockholm and Tokyo. Almost all the other communications links went over to machine ciphers in 1939, but Tokyo was unable to convert. The machine was Swedish made and was called the Krytaa, Sauerbier stating it has possibly 15 numbered wheels. [The interrogator thought it was either a version of the Kryha with the translation of the name being garbled, or a possible Boris Hagelin designed cipher machine. Sauerbier did not seem sensitive on the subject or appear to be garbling deliberately]. He stated that none of the main consular links to Washington, London or Paris were ever read not was there any success with Swedish diplomatic ciphers in section 9C of the FA. Dr Paetzel stated they possibly undertook the cryptanalysis of Swedish Hagelin traffic. Kurt Sauerbier stated that commercial traffic between Turkey and Sweden was attacked particularly, solved but yielded non of the expected information on shipping possibilities. [It is not clear whether this is Swedish or Turkish traffic.]
Switzerland	Dr Paetzel stated that the Swiss Enigma was formerly broken for a while, but only when it was improperly used. The same internal settings were used for a long time. After the inner settings changed we did not have any more solutions. At first we reconstructed the wheels from the cribs and from the fact that the inner settings remained the same. In this 1943 Report, Dr Brandes of the Pers Z S mentions a solution of the Swiss Enigma. Apparently the FA furnished Pers Z S with a partial solution which Senior Specialist Dr Werner Kunze was able to complete. Thereafter there was an exchange of keys between the two agencies. The Pers Z S Yearly Report for 1941, Report No. 8, mentions a 2304 group, three letter code. Its tables were first solved by the FA and later by Pers Z S.
Thailand	At the beginning of 1942, Pers Z S turned over a Taiwanese code to the FA to copy.
Turkey	Erwin Rentschler claimed some success with high grade Turkish diplomatic systems. Walter Kotschy, a Hungarian interpreter, who was a member of the Italian desk of the Afrika Korps, and trained in encoding and decoding at Inspectorate 7/VI and Heinz Boscheinen, a Turkish interpreter worked in Rudolf Bailovic's section in Inspectorate 7/VI stated that the: Inspectorate 7/VI Organization broke the Turkish diplomatic Code when the FA was having difficulties with it. and subsequently stated that the FA turned over Turkish diplomatic to KONA 4 in the Balkans, receiving only decoded traffic from Inspectorate 7/VI.
Holy See	In a captured Pers Z S reconstruction of a Vatican Code Book, the signature of Fräulein Titschak, who was a member of the Pers Z S cipher bureau, is clearly show with an attached date of August 1939 and a notation that she has copied out values of that time for the FA. The Annual Report of the Pers Z S for 1940 indicates that while Pers ZS did some work on Vatican systems, most of the identifications on Vatican systems were received from the FA.

== Evaluation ==
The operation of the FA, in conjunction with the list of FA cryptologic successes, was believed by TICOM to provide ample evidence to state that the FA was a highly successful intelligence producing organization. From an account given to the interrogators, it was obvious that the FA received a vast amount of material, processed it and sent it to those people and organizations who could make the most use of it. The level of co-operation with other German cryptologic agencies is difficult to estimate. Certainly the statements of individuals employed by the different agencies as regard FA, were defeatist in tone. Both the other agencies and the FA complained that they knew little of each other's operational counterparts with the other agencies personnel stating that the FA personnel were standoffish and exclusive. Yet examination of activity reports, yearly reports, captured work books, memos and other salient information revealed an active exchange of technical data, coordination and sharing of assignments of personnel at all levels.
