= Der Alte (TV series) =

German crime drama series

- Der Alte
- Starring: Siegfried Lowitz; Rolf Schimpf; Walter Kreye; Jan-Gregor Kremp; Thomas Heinze
- Countries of origin: West Germany (1977-1990); Germany (1990-)
- No. of episodes: 451

Production
- Executive producers: Helmut Ringelmann (episodes 1-356); Susanne Porsche (episodes 357-present)
- Running time: 60 minutes

Original release
- Network: ZDF
- Release: 11 April 1977 – present

Der Alte ("The Old One" or "The Old Fox") is a German crime drama series created by Helmut Ringelmann. It premiered on 11 April 1977 on ZDF. Since 1978 the series is part of the Friday Crime Night of the network.

It depicts the crime-solving activities of five police detectives: until 1985, Chief Inspector Erwin Köster, played by Siegfried Lowitz; from 1977 to 1986, Chief Inspector Leo Kress, played by Rolf Schimpf; from 1986 to 2007, Chief Inspector Rolf Herzog, played by Walter Kreye; from 2008 to 2012 and from 2012 to 2023, Chief Inspector Richard Voss, played by Jan-Gregor Kremp and from 2023, Chief Inspector Caspar Bergmann, played by Thomas Heinze.

Chief Inspector Köster is the "Old Fox", who uses his psychological understanding of his suspects to lead them into his own trap, to the surprise of his often perplexed staff.

Armed with the wisdom of age and experience, the "Old Fox" hunts down criminals in Munich, assisted by his colleagues, most notably Gerd Heymann, played by Michael Ande between 1977 and 2016 in 401 episodes. The actors or actresses of other assistant characters over the years include Jan Hendriks, Markus Böttcher, Marlene Morreis, Pierre Sanoussi-Bliss, Ludwig Blochberger and Stephanie Stumph.

== See also ==
- Der Kommissar
- Derrick
