= Rainer Erler =

German director and screenwriter (1933–2023)

- Born: 26 August 1933; Munich, Bavaria, Germany
- Died: 8 November 2023 (aged 90); Perth, Western Australia, Australia
- Occupations: Director; Screenwriter

Horst Rainer Erler (26 August 1933 – 8 November 2023) was a German director, screenwriter, writer and producer.

== Life and career ==
Born in Munich, Erler grew up in Solln and entered the film industry as the assistant director of Rudolf Jugert, a role he fulfilled for eight years. During his career he directed over 40 feature films and five stage works, and wrote 14 novels and more than two dozen short stories.

In 1972, Rainer Erler founded the production company Pentagramma with his wife Renate. He had his international breakout in 1979 with the television thriller film Fleisch, which launched the career of Jutta Speidel, was sold in over 120 countries and even released theatrically in a large number of them. His films were often characterized by an original mixture of exploitation, science fiction and political themes.

Active until 2000, during his career Erler received numerous awards and honours, notably the Deutscher Science Fiction Preis and the Federal Cross of Merit. In his later years he moved to Perth, Australia, where he died on 8 November 2023, at the age of 90.

== Selected filmography ==
- Seelenwanderung (1962, TV film)
- Sonderurlaub (1963, TV film)
- The Ringer (1963, TV film) — based on the eponymous play by Edgar Wallace
- Honours for Sale (1963, TV film)
- Lydia muss sterben (1964, TV film) — based on the novel False Bounty by Stephen Ransome
- Das Bohrloch (1966, TV film)
- Fast ein Held (1967)
- Endkampf (1968, TV film)
- Professor Columbus (1968)
- Der Attentäter (1969, TV film)
- The Delegation (1970, TV film)
- Jan Billbusch (1972, TV series, 16 episodes)
- Der Amateur (1972, TV film) — based on the novel Think of a Number by Anders Bodelsen
- Das Blaue Palais (a.k.a. The Blue Palace, 1974–1976, TV series, 5 episodes)
- The Garbage Dump (a.k.a. The Rubbish Tip, 1975, TV film)
- The Last Holidays (1975, TV film)
- Operation Ganymed (1977, TV film)
- Plutonium (1978, TV film)
- Fleisch (a.k.a. Spare Parts, 1979, TV film)
- A Guru Comes (a.k.a. Here Comes the Guru, 1980, TV film)
- Der Spot oder Fast eine Karriere (1981, TV film)
- Das schöne Ende dieser Welt (1984, TV film)
- Nuclear Conspiracy (1986, TV film)
- Sugar (1989, TV film)
- The Kaltenbach Papers (a.k.a. A Fatal Assignment, 1991, TV film)
