= Helmut Ringelmann =

German film and television producer

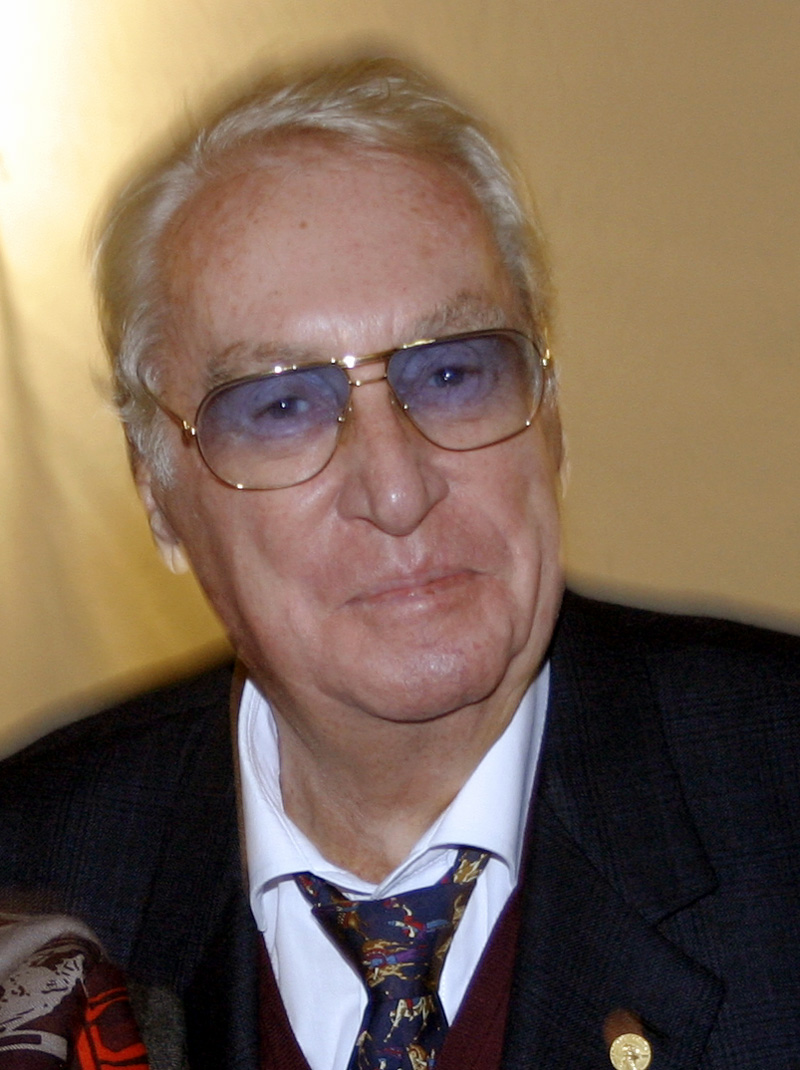
- Born: 4 September 1926; Munich, Weimar Germany
- Died: 20 February 2011 (aged 84); Grünwald, Germany
- Occupation: Producer
- Years active: 1954–2010
- Spouse: Evelyn Opela (m. 1986–2011)

Helmut Ringelmann (4 September 1926 – 20 February 2011) was a German film and television producer.

Ringelmann was born in Munich, he produced a number of television series, including the long running Der Kommissar from 1968 to 1974. He is best remembered as the Producer of the Derrick TV series. Ringelmann died in his house in Grünwald near Munich.
