= Derrick (TV series) =

German crime television series

- Created by: Herbert Reinecker
- Starring: Horst Tappert; Fritz Wepper; Willy Schäfer
- Theme music composer: Les Humphries
- Opening theme: Horst-Tappert-Lied
- Countries of origin: West Germany (1974–90); Germany (1990–98)
- Original language: German
- No. of seasons: 25
- No. of episodes: 281 (list of episodes)

Production
- Executive producer: Helmut Ringelmann
- Running time: 60 minutes

Original release
- Network: ZDF ORF SRG
- Release: 20 October 1974 – 16 October 1998

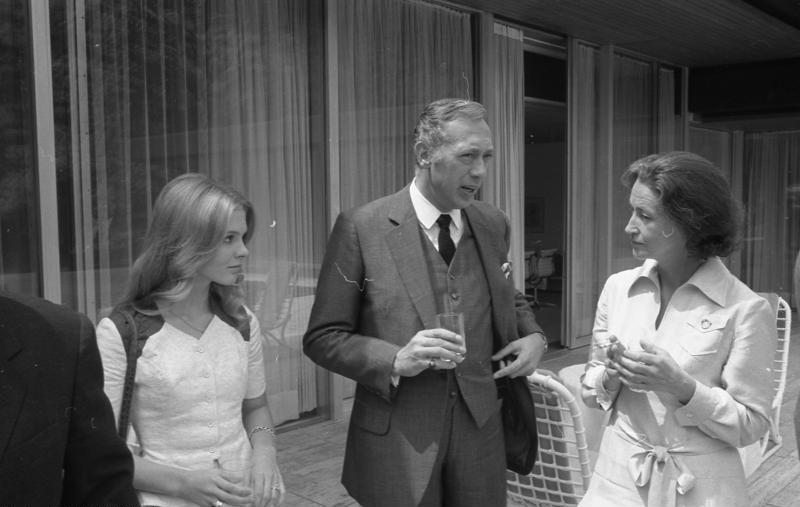
Horst Tappert at a reception of the Chancellor in 1971, with colleague Heidi Hansen (left) and minister Katharina Focke

Derrick is a German crime television series produced between 1974 and 1998, starring Horst Tappert as Detective Chief Inspector (Kriminaloberinspektor) Stephan Derrick, and Fritz Wepper as Detective Sergeant (Kriminalhauptmeister) Harry Klein, his loyal assistant. They solve murder cases in Munich and surroundings (with three unsolved cases in total). It was produced by Telenova Film und Fernsehproduktion in association with ZDF, ORF and SRG.

Derrick is considered to be one of the most successful television programmes in German television history; it was also a major international success, with the series sold in over 100 countries.

== History ==
All 281 sixty-minute episodes were written by veteran screenwriter Herbert Reinecker and produced by Helmut Ringelmann. As a rule, new Derrick episodes were broadcast on Friday night at 8:15 p.m. The series received enormous popularity, and was aired in more than 100 countries worldwide.

The series' discontinuation in October 1998 came as Horst Tappert had reached the age limit he had set himself.

Derrick had many fan clubs abroad, including the Netherlands and France. In France, Derrick is known as Inspecteur Derrick. In Italy, the show is called L'ispettore Derrick. In Chinese, it is known as Dé li kè.

It has been claimed ZDF would no longer carry reruns of the show, after Tappert was found to have been quiet about his service in the Waffen-SS in World War II. However, ZDF has denied that claim.

== Evolution of concept ==
Some episodes follow a whodunit structure, while others follow a howcatchem structure.

The series took a noticeable turn towards psychological drama as time progressed, and Derrick approached retirement age. Acting on a hunch, Derrick would ignore a number of possible suspects right from the start, and instead of doing the legwork often shown in police movies, would follow the main suspect to his or her favourite haunts and involve them in lengthy conversations, claiming that he had to get to know them better. Towards the end of the show, the murderers, now revolted by what they had done, would then be prepared to confess to their crimes without Derrick having to produce any further evidence. Generally, the show has little violence or bloodshed, and no shoot-out at the end.

=== Final episode ===
This philosophy also held true to the last episode, "Das Abschiedsgeschenk" ("The Farewell Gift"). Originally, Derrick was supposed to die by the hands of one of the criminals he had incarcerated, just as he is about to take a new job as the chief of Europol. The violent end was eventually scrapped, though; while there is a shoot-out, no one is killed, and Derrick goes on into the dark city and towards a new life.

== Derrick and Klein ==
As the series begins, Derrick has only recently been promoted from Hauptinspektor to Oberinspektor. The personal relationship between Derrick and his assistant, Klein, is characterized by Derrick's frequent annoyance over Klein, which takes its form as sarcastic remarks to the point of rolling his eyes and shaking his head over his companion in front of witnesses and in public. The reason for this animosity remains unclear, since Klein rarely makes any mistakes, yet Derrick seems to pick at him quite regularly. Klein, though, never talks back and also never gives the slightest appearance of taking offense at this low-level bullying. These many minor episodes notwithstanding, the two work very professionally and organically as a team, but with Derrick always as the leading partner. This behavior of Derrick's becomes less noticeable as the seasons progress.

Derrick hardly has any private life; a girlfriend occurs only in two episodes. In one episode, Derrick says, "no, I am no longer married"; Klein, however, does not seem to have any private life; as a younger inspector, he seems to love getting statements from young, good-looking girls. In that respect and also in the way he goes about a case, Derrick resembles Lt. Columbo. As Umberto Eco has pointed out, though, Columbo is the obedient public servant of rich and powerful Californians (even as he relentlessly, remorselessly, and successfully pursues those engaged in wrongdoing, particularly murder) while Derrick, elegantly dressed and impeccably behaved, always appears in control, and is superior even to the wealthy people he is tracking down.

Just like an earlier television series, Der Kommissar (also written by Reinecker), Derrick features many prominent German and Austrian actors and actresses (including a few expatriates), such as Lilli Palmer, Armin Mueller-Stahl, Klaus Maria Brandauer, Maria Schell, Horst Buchholz, Curd Jürgens, Christine Kaufmann, Brigitte Mira, Gottfried John, Sybil Danning, Reinhard Kolldehoff, Carl Möhner, Eric Pohlmann, Anton Diffring, Ursula Buchfellner and Christoph Waltz. Many appeared repeatedly in different roles throughout several of the seasons.

As one of the first Western TV series shown on the screen of Chinese televisions after the country opened its gate to outside world in 1980s, the series (as "Detective Derek" – 《探长德里克》) was popular in China. Reportedly, it was also actually used to teach police officers and inspectors in proper procedure of tracing and solving criminal cases. Derrick reached cult status in Australia, where it screened on SBS Television with English subtitles.

=== "Harry, hol schon mal den Wagen" ===
The famous phrase "Harry, hol schon mal den Wagen" ("Harry, bring the car 'round"; implying "we're done here") was attributed to Derrick and became part of popular culture in Germany and China as catch phrases. Actually, this phrase was never spoken in any of the 281 episodes; however, in the second episode of the series, "Johanna" (which premiered on 3 November 1974), Derrick orders Klein "Harry! Wir brauchen den Wagen sofort!" ("Harry! We need the car immediately!"). The exact same phrase was used by Erik Ode in the earlier TV series Der Kommissar, where Fritz Wepper already played the character named Harry Klein, then the assistant to a different police inspector (played by Ode).

How exactly this phrase became attributed to Derrick is unknown, but one theory is that since Der Kommissar and Derrick were both created and written by screenwriter Herbert Reinecker, a TV critic may have attributed this phrase to the wrong one of Reinecker's series, after which it entered German popular culture as a catch phrase for Derrick. Horst Tappert did, however, speak this phrase in character as Stephan Derrick was as voice actor of his animated self in the 2004 animated feature film Derrick – die Pflicht ruft (Derrick – Duty calls; see "Beam me up, Scotty" for a catchphrase with a similar background). This animated film shed some satirical light on the ever-serious and sombre world of the original series, making fun of numerous clichés attributed to the series, including Harry's rumoured envy over Derrick standing in the spotlight, while he, Derrick's assistant for 25 years, always stood behind his boss.

== International popularity ==
- The series, with English subtitles, was shown on SBS in Australia for many years.
- The Chinese-dubbed version was broadcast widely in many provincial TV stations in China in the 1980s and 1990s, and the series became a smash hit.
- In Norway, Derrick has been shown throughout the show's history by state-owned broadcaster NRK. Reruns are still running.
- In France, the series has been shown on France 3 television weekday afternoons and was running until May 2013.
- In South Africa, it was dubbed into Afrikaans, with the original German soundtrack simulcast over the radio.
- In Hungary, a Hungarian-dubbed version of the series was a massive hit in the 1970s and 1980s. It still airs occasionally on some television channels.
- In Iran, a Persian-dubbed version of the series is still running in 2014 on the TV station Tamasha.
- In India, an English-dubbed version of the series ran on a state-run TV station Doordarshan during the 1980s.
- In Italy, an Italian-dubbed version of the series was still running in 2015 on the TV station TV2000.
- In Kenya, an English-dubbed version of the series ran on state-run media corporation Kenya Broadcasting Corporation during the 1980s and 1990s.
- In Uganda, an English-dubbed version appeared on state television station UTV for much of the 1980s and '90s alongside other popular German series like Tele-match and Didi's comedy show. The license was owned by Transtel Cologne.
- In the United Kingdom, the series was transmitted by several ITV regions in 1987, including LWT, Yorkshire, Central and HTV.
- In Cameroon, a French-dubbed version was still being aired on its state television station even up to 2014.
- In the Netherlands, the series was broadcast by TROS Television, including several reruns during the 2000s.

== References in popular culture ==
Derrick was briefly referenced in Marjane Satrapi's graphic novel Persepolis.

"Inspektor Derrick" is referenced in Elfriede Jelinek's Die Kinder der Toten.

The series was parodied on the Norwegian comedy show Åpen Post. It was humorously claimed that NRK had bought the rights to produce dubbed remakes of the series' original episodes after the show stopped airing in Germany. However, NRK could not afford expensive remakes, leading to a very simplistic (and, in the viewers' eyes, ridiculous) approach to the show, involving uninspired actors and a strong lack of action.

Derrick has been parodied in the Netherlands in a series called Jiskefet. Herman Koch played the role of inspector Tampert (this name is a corruption of Tappert) and Michiel Romeyn that of his assistant. The parody contained a lot of faux-German and emphasized the slowness of the original series.

In the Netherlands a new phone number was introduced in 2000, to reach the police authorities for non-urgent requests. A TV campaign was launched in 2002 to make the number more well known, entitled "Geen spoed – wel politie" (no urgency – but still police). The TV spot showed Tappert at his house, preparing bratwurst, while being constantly disturbed by phone calls from people trying to reach the police.

== Books ==
Derrick was also used as the protagonist for a series of books published in Germany and Italy:

- Das große Derrick Buch (ISBN 3-89487-239-X), Henschel Verlag (in German)
- Das Derrick Buch (ISBN 3-89487-313-2), Henschel Verlag (in German)
- Derrick «Harry, hol schon mal den Wagen» (ISBN 3-548-35830-6), Ullstein (for ZDF) (in German)
- Die Derrick Story (ISBN 3-932234-63-4), BSV Burgschmiet Verlag (in German)
- Grazie, Derrick (ISBN 88-452-3717-6), Bompiani (in Italian)
- Derrick – L'ordre des choses (ISBN 2-940063-43-5), Les Editions de l'Hèbe (in French)
- Derrick – Eine Erfolgsgeschichte des deutschen Fernsehens (ISBN 3-934305-29-6), Teiresias Verlag (in German)
- Derrick oder Die Leidenschaft für das Mittelmaß (ISBN 3-423-12988-3), Dtv (in German)

== See also ==
- List of Derrick episodes
- Der Kommissar
- The Old Fox
