= Die Manns – Ein Jahrhundertroman =

2001 German TV miniseries

- Genre: Docudrama; Historical drama
- Written by: Heinrich Breloer; Horst Königstein
- Directed by: Heinrich Breloer
- Theme music composer: Hans Peter Ströer
- Country of origin: Germany
- Original language: German
- No. of episodes: 3

Production
- Producer: Sonja Goslicki
- Cinematography: Gernot Roll
- Editors: Monika Bednarz; Olaf Strecker
- Running time: 315 minutes
- Production company: Bavaria Film

Original release
- Network: Arte; Das Erste
- Release: 5 December – 7 December 2001

Die Manns – Ein Jahrhundertroman (German pronunciation: [diː ˈmans ʔaɪn jaːɐ̯ˈhʊndɐtʁoˌmaːn]; The Manns – Novel of a Century) is a 2001 German Docudrama-miniseries directed by Heinrich Breloer. In 2002, it won an International Emmy Award for Best TV Movie or Miniseries.

== Content ==
The miniseries is divided into three parts. The episodes focus on different time periods: 1923 to 1933 (part 1), 1933 to 1941 (part 2), and 1942 to 1955 (part 3). Die Manns combines documentary footage with staged scenes and tells the story of the Mann family, a family of famous writers. It deals with their personal life (passions, tragedies, rivalities), opposition to the Nazis and emigration into the United States from Nazi Germany.

Between the fictional scenes, the miniseries also includes interviews with members of the Mann family and their friends. Elisabeth Mann Borgese, the only living child of Thomas Mann at the time of the filming, is shown on various locations of the film, interviewed about her family by director Breloer.

== Cast ==
- Armin Mueller-Stahl as Thomas Mann
- Jürgen Hentsch as Heinrich Mann
- Monica Bleibtreu as Katia Mann
- Sebastian Koch as Klaus Mann
- Sophie Rois as Erika Mann
- Veronica Ferres as Nelly Kröger
- Stefanie Stappenbeck as Monika Mann
- Philipp Hochmair as Golo Mann
- Katharina Eckerfeld as Elisabeth Mann Borgese
- Rüdiger Klink as Michael Mann
- Anne-Marie Blanc as Hedwig Pringsheim
- Rudolf Wessely as Alfred Pringsheim
- Katharina Thalbach as Therese Giehse
- Torben Liebrecht as Thomas Quinn Curtiss
- Hans-Michael Rehberg as Giuseppe Antonio Borgese
- Gerd David as Gustaf Gründgens
- Andrea Sawatzki as Pamela Wedekind
- Ludwig Blochberger as Klaus Heuser
- Hildegard Schmahl as Salka Viertel
- Norbert Schwientek as Joseph Roth

== Awards ==
Year	Award	Category	Nominated	Result
2002	30th International Emmy Awards	Best TV Movies/Miniseries	Die Manns – Ein Jahrhundertroman	Won
2002	Adolf-Grimme-Preis	Fiction & Entertainment	Die Manns – Ein Jahrhundertroman	Won
2002	German Television Award	Special Award: TV Event of the Year	Die Manns – Ein Jahrhundertroman	Won
2002	Bavarian Television Award	Special Award	Die Manns – Ein Jahrhundertroman	Won
2002	Bavarian Television Award	Best Actor	Jürgen Hentsch, Sebastian Koch, Armin Mueller-Stahl	Won
2002	Bavarian Television Award	Best Actress	Monica Bleibtreu, Veronica Ferres, Sophie Rois	Won
2002	Goldene Kamera	Best TV Film	Die Manns – Ein Jahrhundertroman	Won
2002	Romy	Special Jury Award	Die Manns – Ein Jahrhundertroman	Won
2002	Monte-Carlo Television Festival	Best Screenplay	Heinrich Breloer	Won
