= Hedwig Dohm =

German feminist and writer (1831-1919)

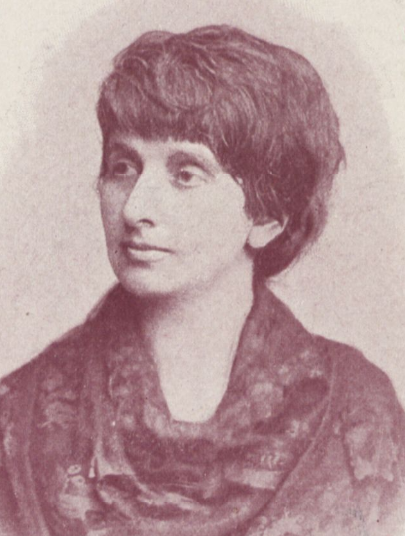
- Hedwig Dohm, c. 1898
- Born: Marianne Adelaide Hedwig Schlesinger; 20 September 1831; Berlin, Kingdom of Prussia
- Died: 1 June 1919 (aged 87); Berlin, Weimar Republic
- Spouse: Ernst Dohm (m. 1853; died 1883)
- Relatives: Gertrude Hedwig Anna Dohm (daughter)

Marianne Adelaide Hedwig Dohm (German pronunciation: [ˈheːtvɪç ˈdoːm]; née Schlesinger, later Schleh; 20 September 1831 – 1 June 1919) was a German feminist and writer.

== Family ==
Hedwig Dohm was born in the Prussian capital Berlin to assimilated Jewish parents, and her father was baptized as a Christian. She was the third child of (Henriette) Wilhelmine Jülich (née Beru) and tobacco manufacturer Gustav Adolph Gotthold Schlesinger (originally Elchanan Cohen Schlesinger). Her father had converted to Protestantism in 1817; in 1851 he adopted the surname Schleh. Hedwig's parents did not marry until 1838, as her father's family had strong reservations about this marital union, and had threatened his son with disinheritance if he married Jülich, who had also been born out of wedlock.

While her brothers were enabled to attend the Gymnasium, Hedwig had to leave school at the age of 15, to help out with household chores. Three years later, she began an apprenticeship at a teaching seminary.

In 1853 she became the wife of writer and actor Ernst Dohm (Elias Levy; 1819–1883), editor-in-chief of the Kladderadatsch satirical magazine, with whom she had five children:

1. Hans Ernst (1854–1866), the only son
2. Gertrude Hedwig Anna (1855–1942), married the mathematician Alfred Pringsheim (1850–1941)
3. Ida Marie Elisabeth "Else" (1856–1922)
4. Marie Pauline Adelheid (1858–?)
5. Eva (1859–?)

Her grandchildren included Katia Mann, Heinz Pringsheim, and Klaus Pringsheim Sr. (children of Hedwig), and Hedda Korsch (daughter of Marie Pauline).

Her great-grandchildren included Erika Mann (who married W.H. Auden), Klaus Mann, Golo Mann, Monika Mann, Elisabeth Mann (who married Giuseppe Borgese), and Michael Mann (all children of Katia).

== Life ==
Hedwig and her husband associated with the intellectual circles in Berlin, the future German capital. In 1867 she published her first study, on the historical development of Spanish national literature, based on the knowledge she had taught herself on an autodidactic basis. From the early 1870s onwards, she published feminist treatises demanding legal, social and economic equality, as well as women's suffrage. These essays encountered opposition by feminists who concentrated on better educational opportunities for young women. In the late 1870s, Hedwig wrote several theatre comedies that were all performed at the Berlin Schauspielhaus.

After her husband died in 1883, she began to write novels, until from the late 1880s she again published numerous treatises on the revived feminist movement. Hedwig Dohm also founded the Reform association advocating a comprehensive educational reform and female university studies. She joined the Frauenwohl ("Women's Welfare") association founded by Minna Cauer as well as Helene Stöcker's League for the Protection of Mothers (Bund für Mutterschutz).

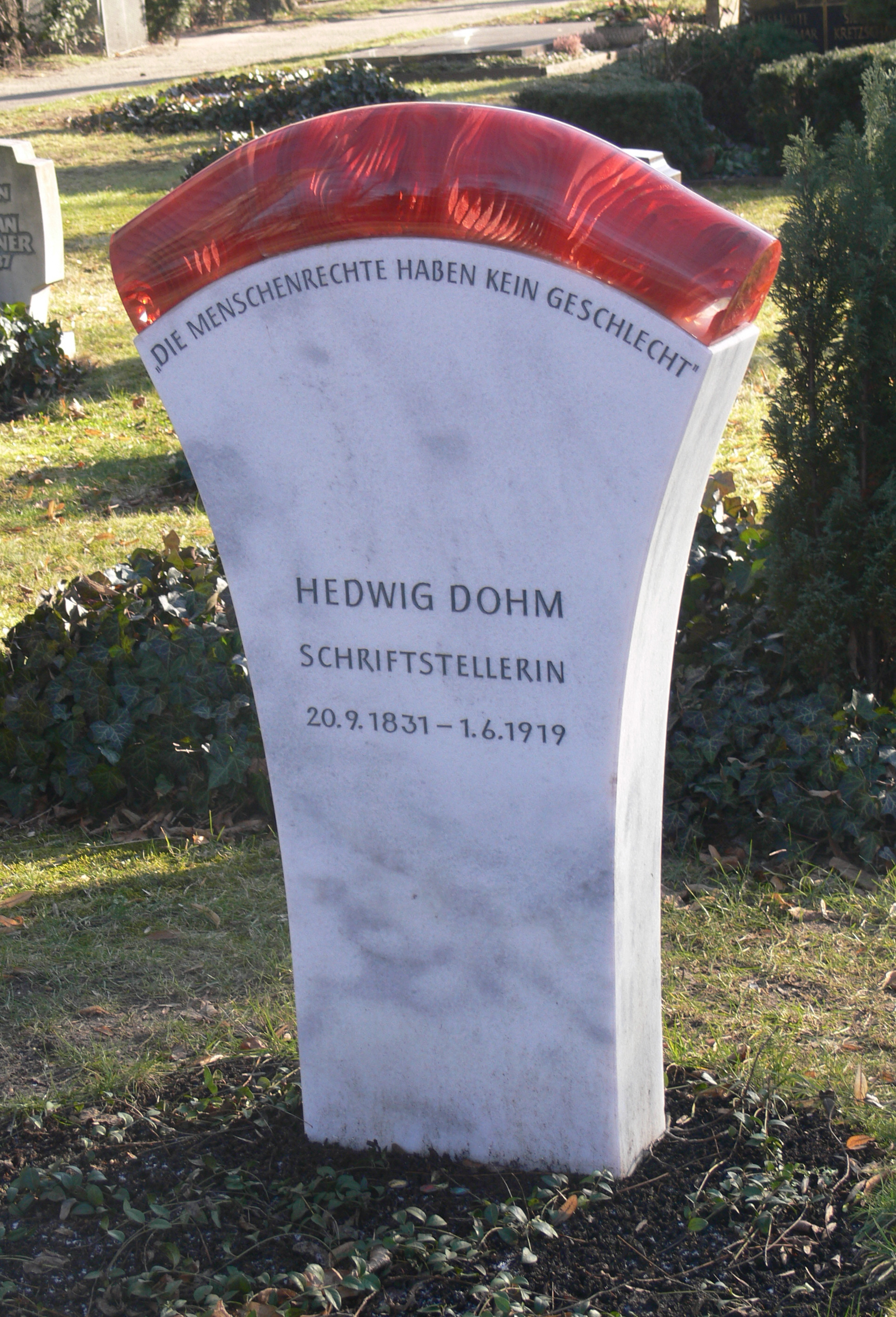
Tomb at Alter St.-Matthäus-Kirchhof

Hedwig Dohm publicly spoke out against the patriotic fever on the eve of World War I, publishing pacifist articles in the communist journal Die Aktion edited by Franz Pfemfert.

Hedwig Dohm died in Berlin at the age of 87. She is buried in the Alter St.-Matthäus-Kirchhof in the Schöneberg district.

== Works ==
Hedwig Dohm was an early pioneer of feminism, and demanded equal education and training for girls as for boys. She was convinced that economic independence was the only way for women to no longer inevitably end up in "marriage prison", but rather to be able to voluntarily, thanks to economic independence, decide for or against an equal partnership with a man.

In addition to the demands for equal education and female employment, she spoke out vehemently for women's suffrage.

Helene Lange judged in 1925: "The disrespect and self-confidence with which Hedwig Dohm wielded her witty pen against men was too unfamiliar to many women who had been brought up in the fear of the Lord."

In The Antifeminists from 1902, Hedwig Dohm uses humorous language to uncover the ideologies of the thought leaders and opinion makers of her own time and exposes their contradictions and fear of the female gender as a stupid defense of claims to power.

In The Mothers from 1903, Dohm addresses motherly love, which, in her view, is not a natural instinct, but is instilled (and, in the absence of other fields of activity for women, cultivated). In order that mothers can continue to pursue their jobs, she suggests having housework and child-rearing done by institutions.

== Appreciation ==
- Since 1991, the Association of Women Journalists has awarded the Hedwig Dohm certificate to women every year for their outstanding journalistic (lifetime) achievements and their commitment to women's politics.
- On 25 October 1994 a street in the new Freiburg district of Rieselfeld was named after her.
- Hedwig-Dohm-Straße in Berlin at the Südkreuz long-distance train station, on the corner of Hildegard-Knef-Platz, has had her name since 2007.
- A school in Berlin-Moabit, Stephanplatz, is named after her.
- On 5 June 2013 a Berlin memorial plaque was unveiled at her former home, Friedrichstrasse 235, in Berlin-Kreuzberg.
- On 6 December 2013 a vocational school was inaugurated in Stuttgart-Nord with Hedwig Dohm as its namesake.
- Since November 2018, her grave has been dedicated to the city of Berlin as an honorary grave.
- A street in the Neustadt district of Bremen is named after her.
- Since 2016, a street in the Franzenbrunnen development area in Saarbrücken has borne her name, Hedwig-Dohm-Straße.
- A Google Doodle was dedicated to her on her 192nd birthday, 20 September 2023.

== Literary works ==
- Was die Pastoren von den Frauen denken, 1872
- Der Jesuitismus im Hausstande, 1873
- Die wissenschaftliche Emanzipation der Frau, 1874
- Der Frauen Natur und Recht, 1876
- Die Antifeministen. Ein Buch der Verteidigung, 1902
- Die Mütter. Ein Beitrag zur Erziehungsfrage, 1903
- Der Mißbrauch des Todes, 1915

=== Literature ===
- Werde die du bist. Wie Frauen werden, 2 novels 1894
- Sibilla Dalmar, 1896
- Schicksale einer Seele, 1899
- Christa Ruland, 1902
