= Ernst Dohm =

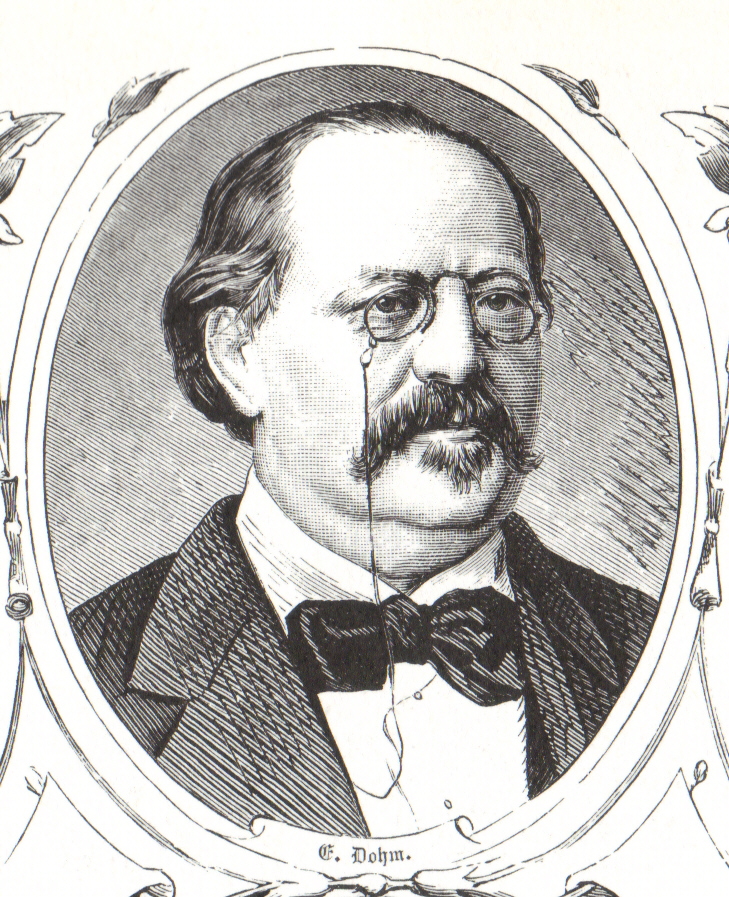
Ernst Dohm.

Friedrich Wilhelm Ernst (or Ernest) Dohm (born Elias Levy Dohm; also known by his pseudonym Karlchen Mießnick; 24 May 1819, Breslau – 5 February 1883, Berlin) was a German editor, actor, and translator.

He was Jewish and a convert to Christianity. He married the feminist Hedwig Dohm and had five children:

1. Hans Ernst Dohm (1854–1866)
2. (Gertrud) Hedwig (Anna) Dohm (1855–1942), married to the Jewish scientist Alfred Pringsheim
3. Ida Marie Elisabeth Dohm (1856–?)
4. Marie Pauline Adelheid Dohm (1858–?)
5. Eva Dohm (1860–?)

He became a grandfather of the musician Klaus Pringsheim Sr. and Katharina "Katia" Pringsheim, the wife of Thomas Mann. He was a chief-editor of Kladderadatsch, a satirical magazine founded in 1848, until 1849.

== See also ==
- Dohm-Mann family tree
- Hedwig Dohm
- Julius Rodenberg
- David Kalisch
