= Hedwig Pringsheim =

German actress (1855–1942)

Gertrud Hedwig Anna Dohm
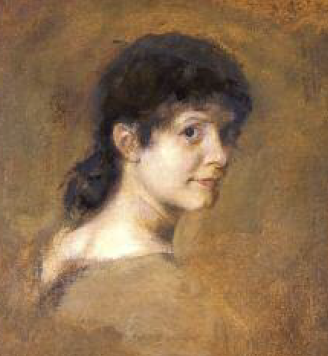
- Born: 13 July 1855; Hedwig Dohm Pringsheim (painting by Franz von Lenbach)
- Died: 27 July 1942 (aged 87); Zurich, Switzerland
- Occupation: Actress
- Spouse: Alfred Pringsheim (m. 1878; died 1941)
- Children: 5
- Parents: Ernst Dohm (father); Hedwig Schlesinger (mother)
- Relatives: Heinz Pringsheim (son); Klaus Pringsheim Sr. (son); Katia Pringsheim (daughter); Erika Mann (granddaughter); Klaus Mann (grandson); Golo Mann (grandson); Monika Mann (granddaughter); Elisabeth Mann (granddaughter); Michael Mann (grandson)

Hedwig Pringsheim (born Gertrud Hedwig Anna Dohm; 13 July 1855 – 27 July 1942) was a German actress.

Born in Berlin, she was the daughter of Ernst Dohm and Hedwig Dohm-Schleh, who were Jewish converts to Christianity. She married Alfred Pringsheim. They had five children: Erich Pringsheim, Peter Pringsheim, Heinz Pringsheim, Klaus Pringsheim Sr. and Katia Pringsheim who married Thomas Mann.

Pringsheim died in Zurich at the age of 87.

== Works ==
- Die Manns – Ein Jahrhundertroman

== See also ==
- Dohm–Mann family tree
