= Monica Bleibtreu =

Austrian-German actress and screenwriter

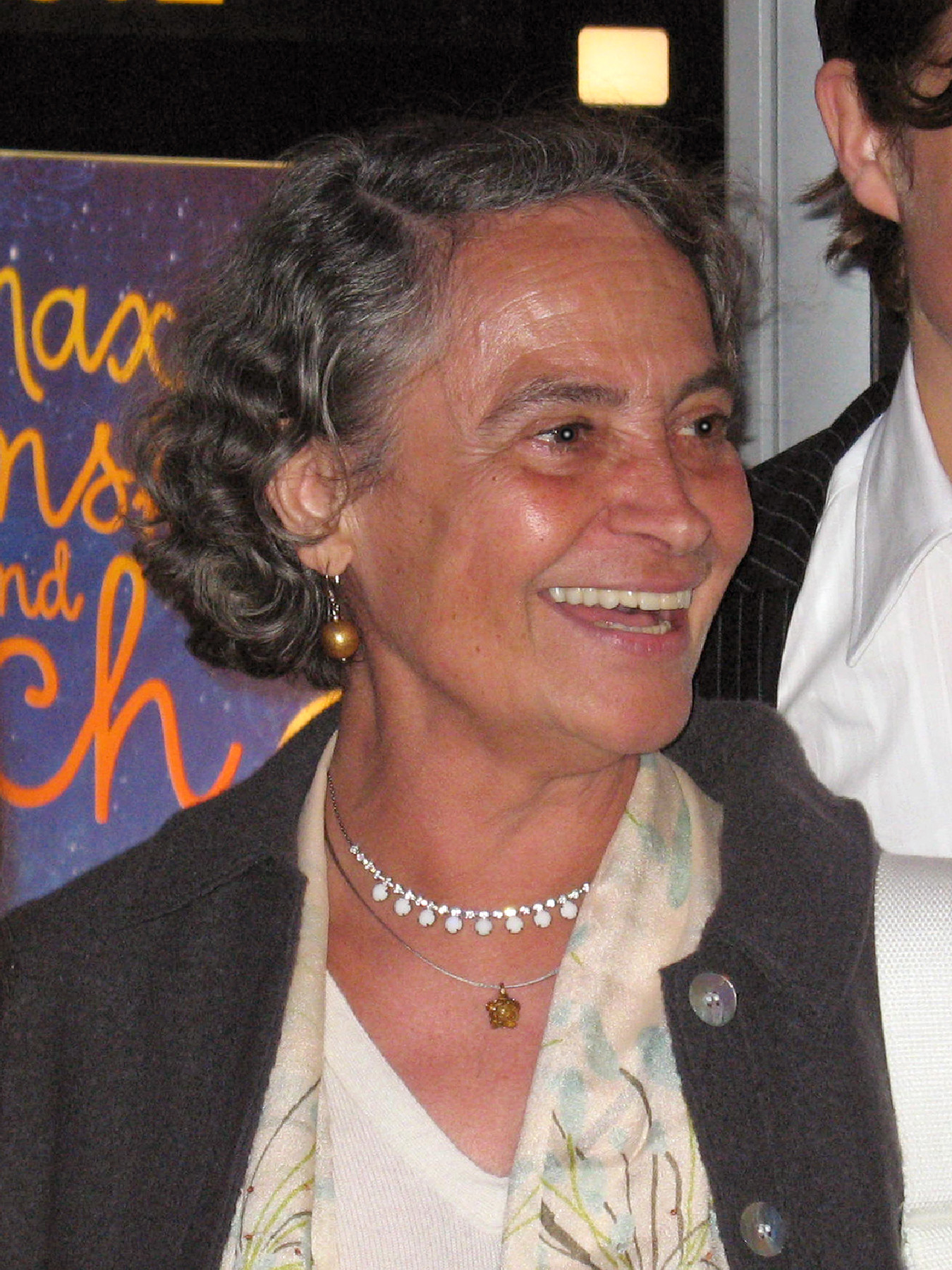
- Bleibtreu at the Premiere of Max Minsky and Me on 2 September 2007
- Born: 4 May 1944; Vienna, Alpine and Danube Reichsgaue, Nazi Germany
- Died: 13 May 2009 (aged 65); Hamburg, Germany

Monica Bleibtreu (German: [ˈmoːnika ˈblaɪptʁɔʏ]; 4 May 1944 – 13 May 2009) was an Austrian-German actress and screenwriter, best known in the German-speaking world for her film, television and stage roles.

== Life and career ==
Bleibtreu was born in Vienna, Austria, the daughter of Helene Buchholt and Renato Attilio Bleibtreu. She studied drama at the renowned Max Reinhardt Seminar in Vienna and made her cinema debut in Ludwig-Requiem for a Virgin King in 1972. Her later roles included appearances in Four Minutes and Tom Tykwer's Run Lola Run, which also starred her son, actor Moritz Bleibtreu.

She also starred as Katia Mann in Heinrich Breloer's television biodrama, The Manns - Novel of a Century, and in Hilde, a biopic of the late German actress and singer Hildegard Knef, which was released in 2009. From 1993 to 1998 Bleibtreu taught drama at the Hochschule für Musik und Theater Hamburg.

Bleibtreu died of lung cancer on 13 May 2009, aged 65, in Hamburg. German President Horst Koehler released a statement saying he was "dismayed" by her death, telling her son that "she enthused countless people" during her career. Her last films, The Murder Farm (Tannöd), directed by Bettina Oberli, and Soul Kitchen, directed by Fatih Akın, were released in 2009 after her death.

== Filmography ==
- 1971: Change (TV film) - Guggi
- 1972: Ludwig: Requiem for a Virgin King - Elisabet Ney
- 1972: Adele Spitzeder (TV film)
- 1976: Lemminge, Teil 2: Verletzungen (TV film)
- 1978: Alzire oder der neue Kontinent - Julie
- 1978: Mittags auf dem Roten Platz (TV film) - Natalja
- 1981: Obszön - Der Fall Peter Herzl - Rosa
- 1982: I'll Be Waiting (TV film) - Nelly Best
- 1982: Das Dorf an der Grenze (TV miniseries) - Hertha
- 1983: Der Zappler - Stefan's Mother
- 1983: Variation (TV film) - Eva
- 1984: Love Is the Beginning of All Terror - Gisela
- 1984: Lenin in Zürich (TV film) - Nadezhda Krupskaya
- 1986: Wohin und zurück 2 – Santa Fe (TV film) - Mrs. Shapiro
- 1986: Mit meinen heißen Tränen (TV film)
- 1987: Lethal Obsession - Cilly
- 1988: Midnight Cop - Mrs. Carstens
- 1992: Mau Mau
- 1997: Maria - Marias Mutter
- 1998: Women Don't Lie - Hausmeisterin
- 1998: Run Lola Run - Die Blinde (uncredited)
- 1998: Love Your Neighbour! - Gräfin
- 1998: Rosenzweigs Freiheit - Judge
- 1999: Ein einzelner Mord - Mother
- 1999: Tödliche Schatten (TV film) - Kommissarin
- 2000: Marlene - Witwe von Losch
- 2000: The Farewell - Helene Weigel
- 2001: Die Manns – Ein Jahrhundertroman (TV miniseries) - Katia Mann
- 2002: Amen. - Mrs. Hinze
- 2002: Ikarus - Ida
- 2002: Tattoo - Kommissarin Roth
- 2002: Bibi Blocksberg - Walpurgia
- 2002: Germanija - Maria
- 2003: Himmel Polt und Hölle (TV film) - Aloisia Habesam
- 2004: The Wishing Tree (TV miniseries) - Tante Lenka
- 2004: Bibi Blocksberg and the Secret of the Blue Owls - Walpurgia
- 2005: Waves (TV film) - Generalin von Palinkow
- 2006: Marias's Last Journey (TV film) - Maria
- 2006: Maria an Callas - Jenny Ritz
- 2006: Four Minutes - Gertrud 'Traude' Krüger
- 2007: Max Minsky and Me - Risa Ginsberg
- 2007: The Heart Is a Dark Forest - Mietzi
- 2008: A Grand Exit (TV film) - Vera Hartel
- 2008: What if Death Do Us Part? - Marie Dunkel
- 2008: My Mother, My Bride and I - Frau Kobarek
- 2009: Hilde - Else Bongers
- 2009: Soul Kitchen - Nadine's Grandmother
- 2009: Ladylike (TV film) - Lore Winter
- 2009: The Murder Farm - Traudl Krieger (final film role)
