= Common Cause (magazine) =

American magazine

- Editor: Elisabeth Mann Borgese
- Categories: political
- Frequency: 12 issues / year (monthly)
- First issue: July 1947; 77 years ago
- Country: United States
- Language: English

Common Cause was an American magazine published from 1947 to 1951 to support the movement for world government that was inspired by the invention and use of the atom bomb.

Soon after the end of World War II, a group of academics and intellectuals, many of them associated with the University of Chicago, responded to a call from University of Chicago Chancellor Robert Maynard Hutchins to draft a world constitution, joining their efforts to those of Richard McKeon and Giuseppe Antonio Borgese, who had originally conceived the task. In November 1945 the committee they formed, which included Mortimer J. Adler, Stringfellow Barr, Albert Léon Guérard, Harold Innis, Erich Kahler, Wilber G. Katz, Charles Howard McIlwain, Robert Redfield, and Rexford Tugwell produced a Preliminary Draft of a World Constitution, later published by the University of Chicago Press (1948).

Common Cause was published from June 1947 through June 1951 in support of the project. The magazine's contributors considered their work to be similar to that undertaken in support of the Constitution of the United States by the authors of The Federalist Papers.
