= Heinz Pringsheim =

- Born: 7 April 1882; Munich, Germany
- Died: 31 March 1974 (aged 91)

Heinz Gerhard Pringsheim (7 April 1882 − 31 March 1974) was a German music critic, composer, pianist and radio contributing editor.

== Life ==
Born in Munich, Pringsheim was a son from the marriage of the mathematician and patron of the arts Alfred Pringsheim, the friend and pioneer of Richard Wagner, with the actress Hedwig Pringsheim. His brother Klaus Pringsheim Sr. was a well-known conductor and music teacher, his sister Katia became the wife of Thomas Mann in 1905.

In 1899 Pringsheim passed the Abitur at the Wilhelmsgymnasium München.

Pringsheim came to music only in a detour. He received his doctorate in 1905 in archaeology, then became a répétiteur under Richard Strauss, became conductor, then went to Berlin and in 1921 composed the music for Mary Wigman's Die sieben Tänze des Lebens. He also worked as a music critic in Berlin until the National Socialists imposed the Berufsverbot on him in 1933.

After the end of the Second World War, Pringsheim established the music department of the Bayerischer Rundfunk in his hometown Munich and founded the series Musica vivatogether with the composer Karl Amadeus Hartmann.

His first wife was the painter Olga Markowa Meerson, with whom he had his daughter Tamara, his second wife Mara brought his son Horst into the marriage.

Pringsheim died in Munich at the age of 91.

== Books and articles ==
- Archäologische Beiträge zur Geschichte des eleusinischen Kults. Dissertation, Munich 1905
- Labyrinthe. Berlin 1920
- Glück und Ende der Verdi-Renaissance. In Melos. Volume 18, 1951, pp. .46–48
- Die heutige Situation der Musik. In Melos. Volume 20, 1953, pp. 65–68
- Wohin steuern wir? In Melos. Volume 21, 1954, pp. 71–74
