= Mann family =

German family

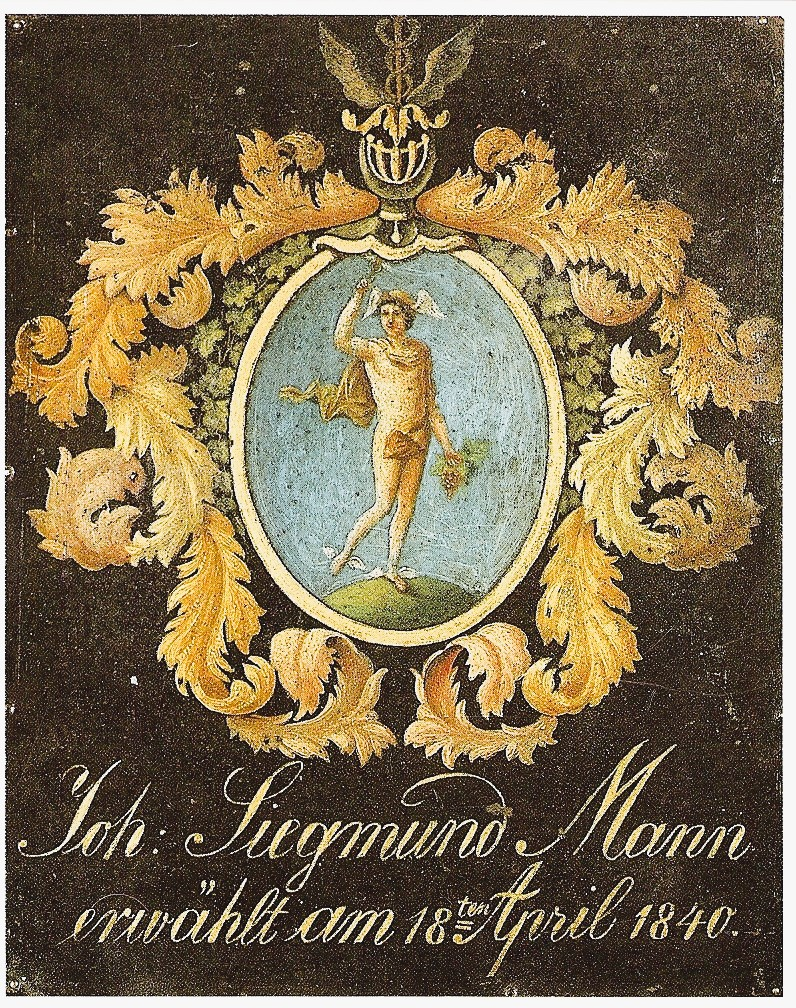
Coat of arms of Johann Siegmund Mann as President of the St. Anna almshouse foundation in 1840

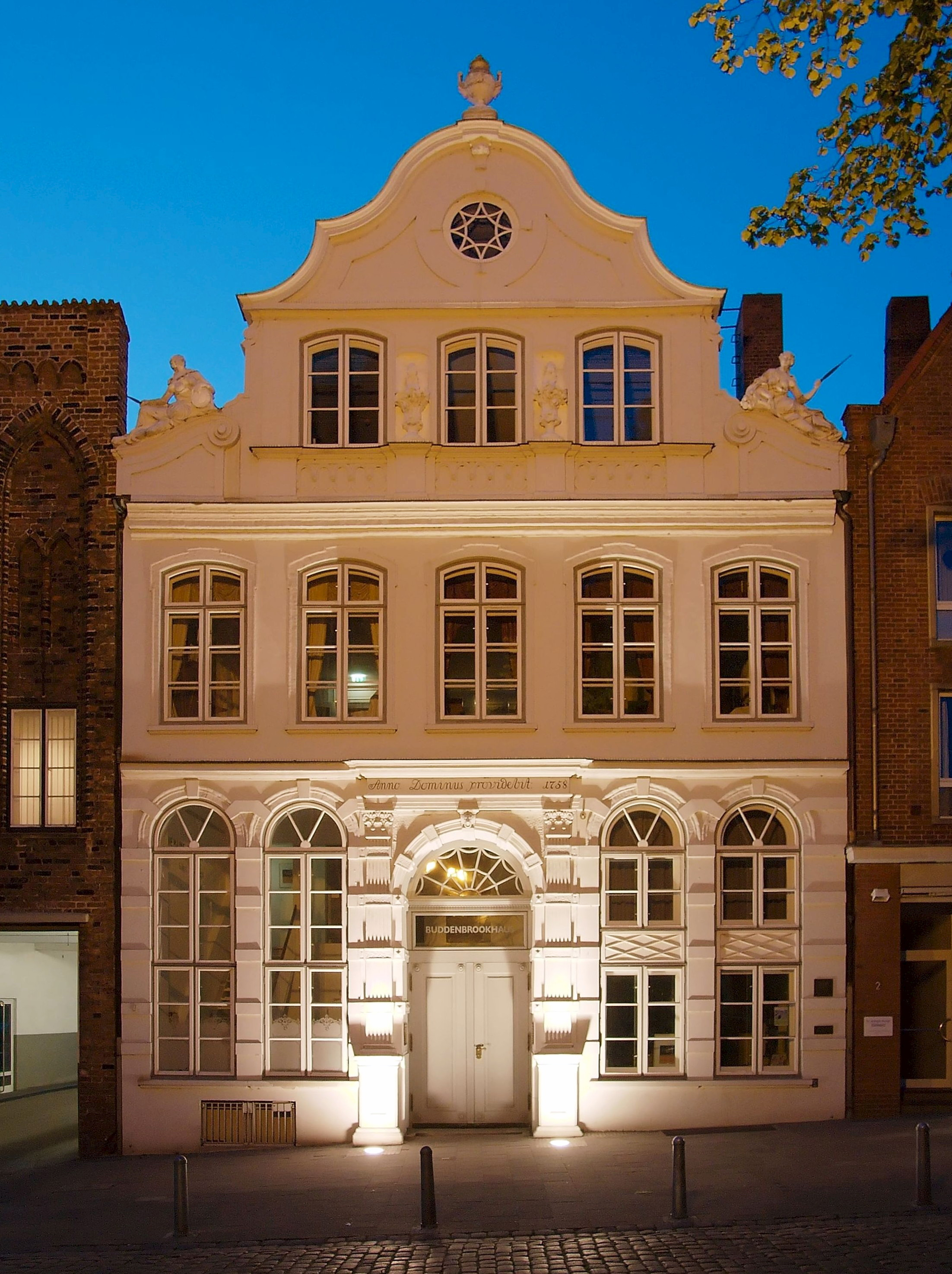
House of the Mann family in Lübeck („Buddenbrookhaus“), now a family museum

The Mann family (UK: /ˈmæn/ MAN, US: /ˈmɑːn/ MAHN; German: [ˈman]) is a German dynasty of novelists and an old Hanseatic family of patricians from Lübeck. It is known for being the family of the Nobel Prize for Literature laureate Thomas Mann.

== History ==
Originally the Manns were merchants, allegedly already in the 16th century in Nuremberg, documented since 1611 in Parchim, since 1713 in Rostock and since 1775 in Lübeck. There they became wealthy grain merchants, a Hanseatic family and as such members of the small ruling class of the Free City of Lübeck, a city republic and state of the German Empire. The symbol in the family's coat of arms is Mercury, the ancient god of commerce (as well as of eloquence).

The family's most famous member is Nobel Prize for Literature laureate Thomas Mann, who portrayed his own family and social class in the novel Buddenbrooks. In 1877, Thomas Mann's father Thomas Johann Heinrich Mann was elected Senator of Lübeck (corresponding to presiding minister of a government office in other German states).

== Lineage ==
- Johann Siegmund Mann (1761–1848), Lübeck merchant, married Anna Catharina Grotjan (1766–1842)
  - Johann Siegmund Mann jr. (1797–1863), Lübeck merchant, married Emilie Wunderlich (1806–1833), second marriage from 1837 to Elisabeth Marty (1811–1890)
    - Marie Elisabeth Amalia Mann (1838–1917), married Ernst Elfeld (1829–1912), Hamburg merchant; married secondly to Gustav Haag, Esslinger merchant
      - Olga Catharina Elisabeth Elfeld
      - Siegmund Christian Carl Elfeld
      - Alice Haag
      - Ewald Siegmund Henry Haag
    - Johannes Mann (1842–1844)
    - Olga Marie Mann (1845–1886), married Gustav Sievers, St. Petersburg merchant
    - Friedrich Wilhelm Lebrecht Mann (1847–1926)
    - Thomas Johann Heinrich Mann (1840–1891), Lübeck merchant and senator, married Júlia da Silva Bruhns (1851–1923)
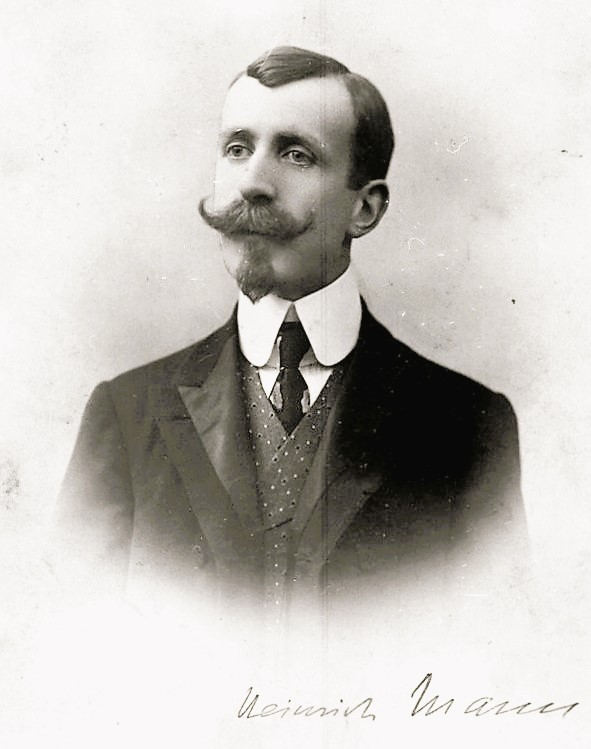
      - Heinrich Mann
        Luiz Heinrich Mann (1871–1950), author, president of the fine poetry division of the Prussian Academy of Arts, married Maria Kanová (1886–1947), divorced 1930, married from 1939 to Nelly Kröger (1898–1944)
        - Carla Maria Henriette Leonie Mann (1916–1986), married Ludvík Aškenazy (1921–1986), author
          - Jindřich Mann-Aškenazy (born 1948), film maker and author
            - Hannah Mann (born 1980)
            - Jenny Lucia Mann (born 1983)
          - Ludvik Mann-Aškenazy (born 1956), film maker
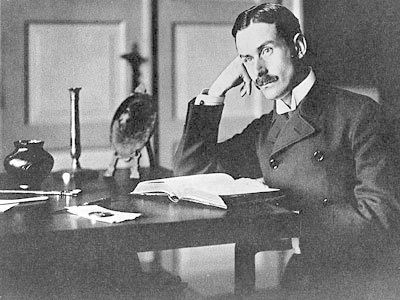
      - Thomas Mann
        Paul Thomas Mann (1875–1955), Nobel Prize for Literature laureate, married Katharina "Katia" Pringsheim (1883–1980)
        - Erika Mann (1905–1969), author, married Gustaf Gründgens (1899–1963), actor and director; married secondly to Wystan H. Auden (1907–1973), poet
        - Klaus Mann (1906–1949), author, editor, journalist
        - Gottfried Golo Mann (1909–1994), historian, author
          - Hans Beck-Mann (adopted son) (died 1986)
        - Monika Mann (1910–1992), author, married Jenö Lányi (1902–1940), art historian
        - Elisabeth Mann Borgese (1918–2002), author, married Giuseppe Antonio Borgese (1882–1952)
          - Angelica Borgese (born 1940), physicist, married Marcello Colocci (born 1941), physicist
            - Michele Colocci (born 1963), financier, married Anne Elizabeth Pryor (born 1964), art advisor
              - Thomas Colocci (born 1994)
              - Isabella Colocci (born 1996)
            - Natalia Colocci (born 1968), physician, married Ken Brameld
              - Annabelle Brameld (born 2005)
              - Maximilian Brameld (born 2007)
          - Dominica Borgese (born 1944), biologist, married, Ettore Guidi, physician
            - Marta Guidi
        - Michael Thomas Mann (1919–1977), professor of German literature, married Gret Moser (1916–2007)
          - Fridolin "Frido" Mann (born 1940), professor of psychology, married Christine Heisenberg (daughter of Werner Heisenberg)
            - Stefan Mann (born 1968), economist, married Kristina Zschiegner (born 1964)
              - Lukas Mann (born 1994)
              - Julia Mann (born 1996)
              - Konstantin Mann (born 1998)
          - Anthony Mann (born 1942)
          - Raju Mann (adopted daughter) (born 1963)
            - Juliet Mann Ward (born 1999) daughter
      - Julia Elisabeth Therese Mann (1877–1927), married Josef Löhr (1862–1922), banker
        - Eva Maria Elisabeth Löhr (1901–1968), married Hans Bohnenberger (1901–1989), bank employee
        - Rosa Marie Julia Löhr (1907–1994), married Friedrich Alder (1914–1942), gardener
        - Ilse Marie Julia Löhr (born 1907)
      - Carla Augusta Olga Maria Mann (1881–1910), actress
      - Karl Viktor Mann (1890–1949), economist, married Magdalena Nelly Kilian (1895–1962)

== Dohm-Mann family tree ==
The Dohm-Mann family tree contains a number of famous writers, musicians and actors. This family tree is not complete but is focused on showing the relationship of the well-known members of the family.

Heinrich Mann
Julia Mann
Thomas Johann Heinrich Mann
Ludwig Herman Bruhns	Carla Mann	Gustaf Gründgens
Júlia da Silva Bruhns
Maria da Silva	Viktor Mann	Erika Mann
Hans Ernst Dohm	Thomas Mann	W. H. Auden
Hedwig Dohm	Katharina Pringsheim	Klaus Mann
Ernst Dohm	Alfred Pringsheim	Klaus Pringsheim Sr.	Golo Mann
Ida Marie Elisabeth Dohm	Monika Mann
Gustav Adolph Schleh
Hedwig Dohm	Marie Pauline Adelheid Dohm	Elisabeth Mann	Angelica Borgese
Wilhelmine Jülich
Eva Dohm	Giuseppe Antonio Borgese	Dominica Borgese
Michael Mann

== Research ==
=== TMI Research ===
The metadatabase TMI-Research brings together archival materials and library holdings of the network "Thomas Mann International". The network was founded in 2017 by the five houses Buddenbrookhaus/Heinrich-und-Thomas-Mann-Zentrum (Lübeck), the Monacensia im Hildebrandhaus (Munich), the Thomas Mann Archive of the ETH Zurich (Zurich/Switzerland), the Thomas Mann House (Los Angeles/USA) and the Thomo Manno kultūros centras/Thomas Mann Culture Centre (Nida/Lithuania). The houses stand for the main stations of Thomas Mann's life and his family. The platform, which is hosted by ETH Zurich, allows researches in the collections of the network partners across all houses. The database is freely accessible and contains over 165,000 records on letters, original editions, photographs, monographs and essays on Thomas Mann and the Mann family.

== Adaptations ==
Heinrich Breloer wrote and directed the 2001 miniseries Die Manns – Ein Jahrhundertroman, which won the International Emmy Award for Best TV Movie or Miniseries.

== Literature ==
- Naumann, Uwe (ed.): Die Kinder der Manns. Ein Familienalbum. Reinbek, 2005. ISBN 3-498-04688-8
- Stübbe, Michael: Die Manns. Genealogie einer deutschen Schriftstellerfamilie. Degener & Co, 2004. ISBN 3-7686-5189-4
- Marianne Krüll: Im Netz der Zauberer. Fischer, 1999. ISBN 3-596-11381-4
- Hans Wißkirchen: Die Familie Mann. Rowohlt, 1999. ISBN 3-499-50630-0
- Jindrich Mann: "Prag, poste restante. Eine unbekannte Geschichte der Familie Mann". Rowohlt Verlag 2007. ISBN 3-498-04500-8
- Die Manns – Genealogie einer deutschen Schriftstellerfamilie in Deutsches Familienarchiv Bd. 145, Degener & Co., Insingen 2005. ISBN 3-7686-5188-6
