= Abel–Dini–Pringsheim theorem =

Convergence test for a series

In calculus, the Abel–Dini–Pringsheim theorem is a convergence test which constructs from a divergent series a series that diverges more slowly, and from convergent series one that converges more slowly. Consequently, for every convergence test based on a particular series there is a series about which the test is inconclusive. For example, the Raabe test is essentially a comparison test based on the family of series whose $n$th term is $1/n^t$ (with $t\in\mathbb R$) and is therefore inconclusive about the series of terms $1/(n\ln n)$ which diverges more slowly than the harmonic series.

== Definitions ==
The Abel–Dini–Pringsheim theorem can be given for divergent series or convergent series. Helpfully, these definitions are equivalent, and it suffices to prove only one case. This is because applying the Abel–Dini–Pringsheim theorem for divergent series to the series with partial sum

$$S_n'=\frac1{r_n}$$

yields the Abel–Dini–Pringsheim theorem for convergent series.

=== For divergent series ===
Suppose that $(a_n)_{n=0}^\infty\subset(0,\infty)$ is a sequence of positive real numbers such that the series

$$\sum_{n=0}^\infty a_n=\infty$$

diverges to infinity. Let $S_n=a_0+a_1+\cdots+a_n$ denote the $n$th partial sum. The Abel–Dini–Pringsheim theorem for divergent series states that the following conditions hold.

1. $\sum_{n=0}^\infty\frac{a_n}{S_n}=\infty$
2. For all $\epsilon>0$ we have $\sum_{n=1}^\infty\frac{a_n}{S_nS_{n-1}^\epsilon}<\infty$
3. If also $\lim_{n\to\infty}\frac{a_n}{S_n}=0$, then $\sum_{k=0}^n \frac{a_k}{S_k} \sim \ln S_n$

Consequently, the series

$$\sum_{n=0}^\infty\frac{a_n}{S_n^t}$$

converges if $t>1$ and diverges if $t\le1$. When $t\le1$, this series diverges less rapidly than $a_n$.

Proof

Proof of the first part. By the assumption $S_n$ is nondecreasing and diverges to infinity. So, for all $n\in\{0,1,2,\dots\}$ there is $k_n\geq 1$ such that

$$\frac{S_n}{S_{n+k_n}}<\frac12$$

Therefore

$$\frac{a_{n+1}}{S_{n+1}}+\cdots+\frac{a_{n+k_n}}{S_{n+k_n}}\ge\frac{a_{n+1}+\cdots+a_{n+k_n}}{S_{n+k_n}}=\frac{S_{n+k_n}-S_{n}}{S_{n+k_n}}=1-\frac{S_n}{S_{n+k_n}}>\frac12$$

and hence $a_0/S_0+\cdots+a_n/S_n$ is not a Cauchy sequence. This implies that the series

$$\sum_{n=0}^\infty\frac{a_n}{S_n}$$

is divergent.

Proof of the second part. If $0<\epsilon\le\epsilon'$, we have $S_n\ge1$ for sufficiently large $n$ and thus $a_n/(S_nS_{n-1}^\epsilon)\ge a_n/(S_nS_{n-1}^{\epsilon'})$. So, it suffices to consider the case $0<\epsilon\le1$. For all $x\in(0,\infty)$ we have the inequality

$$\epsilon(1-x)\le1-x^\epsilon.$$

This is because, letting

$$f(x)=\epsilon(1-x)-1+x^\epsilon$$

we have

$$f(1)=0$$
$$f'(x)=\epsilon(x^{\epsilon-1}-1)\ge0\qquad(\forall x\in(0,1])$$
$$f'(x)=\epsilon(x^{\epsilon-1}-1)\le0\qquad(\forall x\in[1,\infty)).$$

(Alternatively, $g(x)=1-x^\epsilon$ is convex and its tangent at $1$ is $y=g'(1)(x-1)=\epsilon(1-x)$) Therefore,

$$\begin{align}
\sum_{n=1}^\infty\frac{a_n}{S_nS_{n-1}^\epsilon}
&=\sum_{n=1}^\infty\frac{S_n-S_{n-1}}{S_nS_{n-1}^\epsilon}\\
&=\sum_{n=1}^\infty\frac1{S_{n-1}^\epsilon}\left(1-\frac{S_{n-1}}{S_n}\right)\\
&\le\sum_{n=1}^\infty\frac1{\epsilon S_{n-1}^\epsilon}\left(1-\left(\frac{S_{n-1}}{S_n}\right)^\epsilon\right)\\
&=\sum_{n=1}^\infty\frac1\epsilon\left(\frac1{S_{n-1}^\epsilon}-\frac1{S_n^\epsilon}\right)\\
&=\frac1{\epsilon S_0^\epsilon}\\
&<\infty
\end{align}$$

Proof of the third part. The sequence $\ln S_n$ is nondecreasing and diverges to infinity. By the Stolz–Cesàro theorem,

$$\begin{align}
\lim_{n\to\infty}\frac{a_0/S_0+a_1/S_1+\cdots+a_n/S_n}{\ln S_n}
&=\lim_{n\to\infty}\frac{a_0/S_0+a_1/S_1+\cdots+a_n/S_n}{\ln S_0+\ln(S_1/S_0)+\cdots+\ln(S_n/S_{n-1})}\\
&=\lim_{n\to\infty}\frac{a_n/S_n}{\ln(S_n/S_{n-1})}\\
&=\lim_{n\to\infty}\frac{a_n/S_n}{\ln(S_n/(S_n-a_n))}\\
&=\lim_{n\to\infty}\frac{a_n/S_n}{\ln(1/(1-a_n/S_n))}\\
&=\lim_{n\to\infty}\left(-\frac{a_n/S_n}{\ln(1-a_n/S_n)}\right)\\
&=1
\end{align}$$

=== For convergent series ===
Suppose that $(a_n)_{n=0}^\infty\subset(0,\infty)$ is a sequence of positive real numbers such that the series

$$\sum_{n=0}^\infty a_n<\infty$$

converges to a finite number. Let $r_n=a_n+a_{n+1}+a_{n+2}+\cdots$ denote the $(n-1)$th remainder of the series. According to the Abel–Dini–Pringsheim theorem for convergent series, the following conditions hold.

- $\sum_{n=0}^\infty\frac{a_n}{r_n}=\infty$
- For all $\epsilon>0$ we have $\sum_{n=0}^\infty\frac{a_n}{r_n^{1-\epsilon}}<\infty$
- If also $\lim_{n\to\infty}\frac{a_n}{r_n}=0$ then $\lim_{n\to\infty}\frac{a_0/r_0+a_1/r_1+\cdots+a_n/r_n}{\ln r_n}=-1$

In particular, the series

$$\sum_{n=0}^\infty\frac{a_n}{r_n^t}$$

is convergent when $t<1$, and divergent when $t\ge1$. When $t<1$, this series converges more slowly than $a_n$.

== Examples ==
The series

$$\sum_{n=0}^\infty1$$

is divergent with the $n$th partial sum being $n$. By the Abel–Dini–Pringsheim theorem, the series

$$\sum_{n=0}^\infty\frac1{n^t}$$

converges when $t>1$ and diverges when $t\le1$. Since $1/n$ converges to 0, we have the asymptotic approximation

$$\lim_{n\to\infty}\frac{1+1/2+\cdots+1/n}{\ln n}=1.$$

Now, consider the divergent series

$$\sum_{n=1}^\infty\frac1n$$

thus found. Apply the Abel–Dini–Pringsheim theorem but with partial sum replaced by asymptotically equivalent sequence $\ln n$. (It is not hard to verify that this can always be done.) Then we may conclude that the series

$$\sum_{n=1}^\infty\frac1{n\ln^tn}$$

converges when $t>1$ and diverges when $t\le1$. Since $1/(n\ln n)$ converges to 0, we have

$$\lim_{n\to\infty}\frac{1+1/(2\ln 2)+\cdots+1/(n\ln n)}{\ln\ln n}=1.$$

== Historical notes ==
The theorem was proved in three parts. Niels Henrik Abel proved a weak form of the first part of the theorem (for divergent series). Ulisse Dini proved the complete form and a weak form of the second part. Alfred Pringsheim proved the second part of the theorem. The third part is due to Ernesto Cesàro.
