= Isotaro Sugata =

Japanese composer

- Isotaro Sugata (須賀田礒太郎)
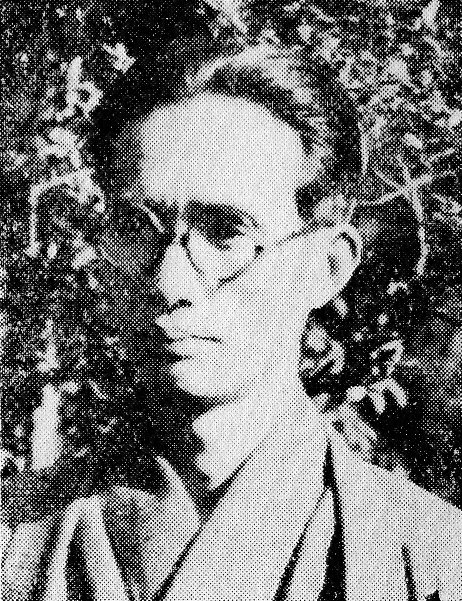
- Isotaro Sugata
- Born: 15 November 1907
- Died: 5 July 1952 (aged 44)

Isotaro Sugata (Japanese: 須賀田礒太郎 Sugata, Isotaro; Yokohama, 15 November 1907 – Tanuma, Tochigi, 5 July 1952) was a Japanese composer.

== Biography ==
Sugata received his education with missionaries in Kanto Gakuin University. There he was influenced by listening to hymns and received lessons for piano, violin, music theory and singing. In 1927 he acquired tuberculosis and then concentrated solely on his composition studies. From 1928 he studied with Kosaku Yamada and Kiyoshi Nobutoki, who had studied in Berlin. Nobutoki taught him music theory in the German tradition.

In 1931 he began studies with Meiro Sugahara, who believed that German music was not a good model for Japanese composers who wanted to compose in Western style with Japanese sensibility, on the principles of Gagaku, Buddhist music and Kabuki music. He considered French, Italian and Russian music more appropriate for the Japanese mentality, because it offers more flexible sounds by using Whole tone and Japanese scales. Sugahara gave the advice to Sugata that composers such as Shiro Fukai were better than the works of Claude Debussy, Maurice Ravel, Igor Stravinsky, Ottorino Respighi and Darius Milhaud to study. As a result, Sugata wrote two major orchestral works in a style that can be described as "Oriental Stravinsky", namely "Yokohama" (1932) and "Symphonic Fantasia" SAKURA "(Cherry Blossoms)" (1933).

In 1933 he returned to German-tinted music and studied with Klaus Pringsheim Sr., a teacher in the neoclassical style and a former pupil of Gustav Mahler, who at the time was a professor at the Tokyo National University of Fine Arts and Music. From then on he studied German music from Johann Sebastian Bach to Paul Hindemith and was interested in Arnold Schoenberg and his atonal music. In 1935 his piece Japanese Picture Scroll, won a composition competition held by the Imperial Household Agency. The following year he also won a competition held by the (NHK) with his work Festive Prelude.

During the Second World War he left for Tanuma, where his grandparents lived. He wanted to compose further, but his illness made working difficult for him. He died on 5 July 1952. Most of his works were not published and his manuscripts were forgotten in their house in Tanuma. It was only in 1999 the manuscripts were found again and received public attention.

== Compositions ==
=== Orchestral Music ===
- 1932 Symphonic Poem "Yokohama"
- 1933 Symphonic Fantasia "SAKURA" (Cherry Blossoms)
- 1935 Emaki Japan (Japanese Picture Scroll)
- 1936 Festive Prelude
- 1937 Symphonic Dances
- 1938 Kanto and Tohoku
- 1939 Symphonic Overture, for orchestra, op. 6
- 1940 Peaceful Dance of Two Dragons, for orchestra, op. 8
  1. Jo (misterioso e gentile)
  2. Ha (con gravita e fastoso)
  3. Kyu (grazioso)
- 1941 Anastasia
- 1941 Sketches of the Desert – Suite in Oriental Style, for orchestra, op. 10
  1. Pilgrimage to Mecca
  2. A Caravan in the Desert
  3. The Patrol in the Desert
  4. Dancing Girl in the Orient (Allegretto con sentimento)
  5. Riding Arabs
- 1942 Philharmonic Symphony No. 1 in C
- 1944 Ouverture
- 1949 Picasso painting
- 1950 Japanese Dance Suite
- 1950 The Rhythm of Life, ballet music for orchestra, op. 25
  1. Misterioso
  2. Andante – Moderato scherzando
  3. Lento – Presto capriccioso

=== Chamber music ===
- 1946 String Quartet
- 1935 Sonata "Sonata Romantic", for violin and piano

== Bibliography ==
- Japanese composers and their works (since 1868), Tokyo, 1972.
