= Golo Mann =

20th-century German popular historian

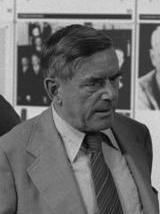
- Born: Angelus Gottfried Thomas Mann; 27 March 1909; Munich, Kingdom of Bavaria, German Empire
- Died: 7 April 1994 (aged 85); Leverkusen, North Rhine-Westphalia, Germany
- Education: University of Freiburg
- Known for: German History in the 19th and 20th Century (1958); Wallenstein; sein Leben erzählt (1971); Erinnerungen und Gedanken. Eine Jugend in Deutschland (1986)
- Parents: Thomas Mann (father); Katia Pringsheim (mother)
- Scientific career
- Fields: Historian
- Workplaces: Claremont Men's College, California; University of Stuttgart

Golo Mann (born Angelus Gottfried Thomas Mann; 27 March 1909 – 7 April 1994) was a popular German historian and essayist. After completing a doctorate in philosophy under Karl Jaspers at Heidelberg, in 1933 he fled Hitler's Germany. He followed his father, the writer Thomas Mann, and other members of his family in emigrating first to France, then to Switzerland and, on the eve of war, to the United States. From the late 1950s he re-established himself in Switzerland and West Germany as a literary historian.

Mann was perhaps best known for his master work German History in the 19th and 20th Century (1958). A survey of German political history, it emphasised the nihilistic and aberrant nature of the Hitler regime. In his later years, Mann took issue with historians who sought to contextualise the crimes of the regime by comparing them with those of Stalinism in Soviet Union and with wartime Allied bombing. At the same time he was sharply critical of those, broadly on the left, who carried a unique German guilt for the Holocaust not only back into the pre-Nazi past but forward in a manner that seemed to question the legitimacy of the postwar Federal Republic.

== Early life and education ==
Mann was born in Munich, the grandchild, on the side of his mother, Katia, of the German Jewish mathematician and artist Alfred Pringsheim and the actress Hedwig Pringsheim, and on the side of his father, the writer Thomas Mann, of the Lübeck senator and grain merchant Johann Heinrich Mann and his Brazilian wife, the writer Júlia da Silva Bruhns who was of Portuguese-Indigenous Brazilian descent.

As a child, he pronounced his first name as Golo, and this name was adopted. He had an elder sister, Erika Mann, an elder brother, Klaus Mann, and three younger siblings, Monika, Elisabeth and Michael.

In her diary his mother describes him in his early years as sensitive, nervous and frightened. His father hardly concealed his disappointment and rarely mentioned the son in his diary. Golo Mann in turn described him later: "Indeed he was able to radiate some kindness, but mostly it was silence, strictness, nervousness or rage." Among his siblings he was most tightly connected with Klaus, whereas he disliked the dogmatism and radical views of his sister Erika.

An average pupil, he received a classical education at the Wilhelms-Gymnasium in Munich beginning in September 1918, revealing talents in history, Latin, and especially in reciting poems, the latter being a lifelong passion. "Longing to be like the others", at school he joined a nationalist youth association (Deutsch-Nationale Jugendbund) but was soon talked out of it by the conversations he heard at the family table: discussion of the need for "tolerance and above all peace, and therefore of above all, so Franco-German reconciliation". Later in the 1920s he shared his father's enthusiasm for Pan-European Union.

New horizons appeared to open in 1923, when Mann entered the Schule Schloss Salem, a famously spartan boarding school where he was joined by his sister Monika, near Lake Constance. He felt liberated from home, enjoyed the new educational approach, and developed an enduring passion for hiking. Yet in 1925 Mann suffered a mental crisis that overshadowed the rest of his life. "In those days the doubt entered my life, or rather broke in with tremendous power ... I was seized by darkest melancholy."

Upon the final school exams in 1927, he commenced his studies of law in Munich, moving the same year to Berlin and switching to history and philosophy. He used the summer of 1928 to learn French in Paris and to get to know "real work" during six weeks in a coal mine in Lower Lusatia, abruptly stopping because of new knee injuries.

At last Mann entered the University of Heidelberg in spring 1929. Here he followed the advice of his teacher Karl Jaspers to graduate in philosophy on the one hand, and to study history and Latin with the prospect of becoming a schoolteacher on the other. He nevertheless found time to join a Social-Democratic Party student group in the autumn of 1930. The students were sharply critical of the party leadership in Berlin for tolerating the presidentialist Brüning government. In May 1932, Mann finished his dissertation, Concerning the terms of the individual and the ego in Hegel's works, which was rated with an average cum laude. (While recognising Mann's literary potential, Jaspers suggested to Mann that the lack of originality and clarity in his analysis is something that would have shamed his father).

Golo Mann's plans to further his university studies in Hamburg and Göttingen were interrupted in January 1933 by Adolf Hitler's appointment as German Chancellor. His father, who never hesitated to articulate his dislike for National Socialism, and his mother moved to Switzerland. Golo Mann looked after the family house in Munich in April 1933, helped his three younger siblings leave the country and brought the greater part of his parents' savings via Karlsruhe and the German embassy in Paris to Switzerland.

== Emigration ==
On 31 May 1933, Mann left Germany for the French town of Bandol near Toulon. He spent the summer at the mansion of the American travel writer William Seabrook near Sanary-sur-Mer and lived six further weeks at the new family house in Küsnacht near Zürich. In November, he joined the École Normale Supérieure at Saint-Cloud near Paris for two intensive, instructive years as lecturer on the German language. At that time, he worked for the emigrants' journal Die Sammlung (The Collection) founded by his brother Klaus.

In November 1935, Mann accepted a call from the University of Rennes to lecture on German language and literature. Mann's travels to Switzerland suggest that the relationship with his father was easier, perhaps because Thomas Mann had learned to appreciate his son's political knowledge. But it was only when Golo Mann helped edit his father's diaries in later years that he realised fully how much acceptance he had gained. In a confidential note to the German critic Marcel Reich-Ranicki he wrote, "It was inevitable that I had to wish his death; but I was completely broken-hearted when he passed away".

In 1936, Thomas Mann and his family were deprived of their German citizenship. His father's admirer, the Czech businessman Rudolf Fleischmann, helped Golo Mann obtain Czechoslovak citizenship, but plans to continue studies in Prague were disrupted by the Sudeten crisis.

Early in 1939, Mann traveled to Princeton, New Jersey, where his father worked as guest professor. Although war was drawing closer, he hesitantly returned to Zürich in August to become editor of the emigrant journal Maß und Wert (Measure and Value).

As a reaction to Adolf Hitler's successes in the West in May 1940 during World War II, and at a time when many of his friends in Zürich were being mobilised for the defence of Swiss neutrality, Mann decided to join a Czech military unit on French soil as a volunteer. Upon crossing the border he was arrested at Annecy and brought to the French concentration camp Les Milles, a brickyard near Aix-en-Provence. In the beginning of August, in what was then unoccupied Vichy France, he was released by the intervention of an American committee. On 13 September 1940, he undertook a daring escape from Perpignan across the Pyrenees to Spain. With him were his uncle Heinrich Mann, the latter's wife Nelly Kröger, Alma Mahler-Werfel and Franz Werfel. On 4 October 1940, they boarded the Nea Hellas headed for New York City.

Mann stayed at his parents' house in Princeton, then in New York City where he lived for a time in what his father described as a "kind of Bohemian colony" with W. H. Auden (with whom his sister Erika contracted a marriage of convenience), Benjamin Britten, the tenor Peter Pears and others.

In the autumn of 1942, Mann finally got the chance to teach history at Olivet College in Michigan, but soon followed his brother Klaus into the US Army. After basic training at Fort McClellan, Alabama, he worked at the Office of Strategic Services in Washington, D.C. In his capacity as intelligence officer it was his duty to collect and translate relevant information.

In April 1944, he was sent to London where he made radio commentaries for the German language division of the American Broadcasting Station. For the last months of World War II, he worked in same function for a military propaganda station in Luxembourg. Then he helped organise the foundation of Radio Frankfurt. During this period, he worked with, and won the confidence of, Robert Lochner. Returning to Germany in the immediate aftermath of the Allied advance, he was shocked at the extent of destruction, especially that caused by British and American bombing.

In 1946, Mann left the US Army by his own request. He nevertheless kept a job as civil control officer, watching the war crimes trials at Nuremberg in this capacity. The same year saw the publication of his first book of lasting value, a biography in English of the 19th century diplomat Friedrich von Gentz who was to account a critical influence upon his own political thinking.

In the autumn of 1947, Mann became an assistant professor of history at Claremont Men's College in California. In hindsight he recalled the nine-year engagement as "the happiest of my life"; on the other hand, he complained, "My students are scornful, unfriendly and painfully stupid as never before". The professorship in California was interrupted by several residences in German-speaking Europe.

== Return to Europe ==
In 1956 and 1957, Mann spent many weeks at the tavern Zur Krone at Altnau on the shores of Lake Constance, writing his German History of the 19th and 20th century. It was published in 1958 and became an instant bestseller. It also marked his final return to Europe because he became guest professor at the University of Münster for two winter terms in a row.

In autumn 1960, Mann joined the University of Stuttgart (then the Technische Hochschule Stuttgart) in the higher position of professor in ordinary for Political Science. It soon became clear that he felt unsatisfied with the machinery at the universities: "In those years I had a feeling of immense, but fruitless effort without getting any echo. This led to a depression that made me resign the professorship in 1963".

In the following years, Mann worked as a free-lance historian and essayist, suffering in both capacities from chronic overwork that increasingly damaged not only his work but also his health. He took up residence at his parents' house in Kilchberg near the Lake of Zurich, where he lived until 1993 — sharing the house for most years with his mother.

Of his sixteen historical studies, the bestselling proved to be a monumental biography of Albrecht von Wallenstein published in 1971. It arose from a fascination in childhood with the role in the Thirty Years' War of the imperial marshal for which, Mann confessed, he had no satisfactory explanation. The LA Times described Wallenstein: His Life Narrated as "a work not only of erudition but of art."

== Political engagement ==
Asked in 1965 by the television interviewer Günter Gaus how in the last days of the Weimar Republic he had avoided being pulled like so many of his generation to the political extremes of either the right or left, Mann suggested it had been a matter not only of analysis but also of temperament. Figures like Calvin or Robespierre, Trotsky or Lenin, he had "always hated". Mann described his own outlook as broadly conservative. But conservatism too he rejected when presented as an "ism"—when represented by those who believed they had a monopoly of truth (as if they had "eaten the truth with a spoon").

By conservative, Mann understood a particular stance (Haltung), or tendency of thought. It is an assessment of human nature sufficiently pessimistic to reject utopian belief in the reliable goodness or reason of man and, accordingly, can appreciate the value of inherited ties, even if irrational, so long as "they bind people and give them a moral and spiritual home." It is not an attitude Mann identified in party-political terms: he might "very well be able to vote Social Democratic" without seeing any contradiction in himself having these basic conservative tendencies.

In early years of the Federal Republic, Mann praised Konrad Adenauer for his policy of seeking reconciliation and integration with France and alliance with the United States. In time, however, he came to criticise the Chancellor's commitment to German unification as largely rhetorical. Later still, believing that the post-war territorial settlement had to be accepted as "an accomplished fact", he supported the Ostpolitik of Willy Brandt as foreign minister (1966–1969) and then as the new Social-Democratic Chancellor (1969–1974). He would sometimes even ghostwrite for Brandt. But he was to emphasise that as an acknowledgement of "hard facts that can no longer be changed", his support of diplomatic recognition of Europe's post-war division was "more conservative than revolutionary".

Mann had been wary of the left-wing student movement and the development of the so-called "extra-parliamentary opposition" (Außerparlamentarische Opposition) in the 1960s and was to reproach Brandt as Chancellor for taking an insufficiently hard line against East German infiltration and domestic subversion. Mann called the terrorist activities of the Red Army Faction "a new development in the phenomenon of civil war".

It was nonetheless a shock to many when in 1979, with a post-script to the politician's hagiographic campaign book, Mann announced his support for Franz-Josef Strauß, the right-wing Chancellor candidate of the CDU/CSU. He sought to justify his choice as precautionary. Tax-supported welfare had advanced to the point at which it "greatly diminished the joy of making money" with potentially dire consequences for a future in which "more and more retirees" will depend, proportionately, on an "ever smaller number of productive workers". There was also need for a retrenchment in Ostpolitik. In Afghanistan the West had failed to contain the Soviet Union. Were he an American, Mann allowed that he would have voted for Reagan rather than Carter.

Mann foresaw the reputational loss of embracing Strauss, a figure who, since the Spiegel Affair in 1962 had been a bete noir of liberal and left opinion. "I will have to pay for it", he wrote in his diary, as Kaiser Wilhelm did for his 'Daily Telegraph Affair'".

In one of his last interviews, with Die Welt in 1991, Mann again alarmed his more liberal readers and colleagues by calling for restrictions on the constitutional provision for political asylum. To the suggestion that Germany should openly acknowledge itself as an immigrant country (Einwanderungsland), the man who had himself sought asylum abroad said "No, the boat is full".

== Hitler in German historiography ==
In the early years of the Federal Republic, Mann acknowledged that Hitler had been an "unpleasant subject" too often avoided. But as a staunch defender of the political and economic achievements of post-war West Germany, once the taboo was broken he had little patience with the Sonderweg thesis which placed Hitlerism within a context of German exceptionalism, or with the "critical-emancipatory" historiography of the 1968 generation and the Bielefeld school of early 1970s. He was critical of what he regarded as the Left's obsession with Vergangenheitsbewältigung (working through the past). In 1978 he posed the rhetorical question: "When will the past cease to poison the present".

It was perhaps from this perspective that, years before, Mann had been among the first critics of Hannah Arendt's Eichmann in Jerusalem (1963). Arendt had portrayed Adolf Eichmann, the principal organiser of the Nazi genocide of European Jewry, less as an exceptional anti-Semite than as a typical, if unusually talented, German bureaucrat. The controversy led to Mann's permanent estrangement from Jaspers, who had also been Arendt's doctoral supervisor.

Mann insisted that there was nothing preordained about Hitlerism. It was not the inevitable product, as others had suggested, of the contradictions of the Reich's formation or of the chaos induced by its defeat in the Great War. The Weimar Republic did not have to collapse; the Jews of Europe did not have to die, or even have to be classified as Jews. In an essay collected in Geschichte und Geschichten (1962), he excoriated A. J. P. Taylor for his certitude on the subject:

To attribute foreseeable necessity to the catastrophe of Germany and the European Jews would be to give it a meaning that it didn't have. There is an unseemly optimism in such an assumption. In the history of mankind there is more that is spontaneous, wilful, unreasonable and senseless than our conceit allows.

At the same time, Mann rejected the temptation to "normalise" the Holocaust by setting the genocide in an international context. Although not among the principal protagonists in the Historikerstreit (historians' dispute, 1986–88), Mann's comments broadly aligned him with Eberhard Jäckel (who had replaced Mann on the faculty in Stuttgart). Like Jäckel, Mann opposed the revisionist efforts of Ernst Nolte to press comparisons with, and to find context in, Stalinism or in Allied carpet bombing, or to otherwise deny the uniqueness of what Mann described as the "vilest crime ever perpetrated by man against man."

== Last years ==
In 1986, his adopted son Hans Beck-Mann died. Beck-Mann was a pharmacist he got to know in 1955 and supported financially in his studies. In November of the same year his successful semi-autobiography Erinnerungen und Gedanken. Eine Jugend in Deutschland (Memories and Thoughts. A Youth in Germany) was published. He immediately started work at a sequel that was never finished. In 1988, he was awarded an Honorary Degree (Doctor of Letters) by the University of Bath.

After the death of his adopted son, he lived a secluded life, most of the time in Berzona, in the Swiss Canton of the Ticino. He devoted his time to translating into German the work of the dark and picaresque Spanish novelist Pío Baroja. He was surrounded by a group of young Spanish-language enthusiasts, some of whom have become notable in their field.

The East German regime lifted its ban on Golo Mann at the beginning of 1989. Not only was his Wallenstein biography finally available in East Germany after 18 years — he was even allowed to read from it on invitation from the East German Minister of Education. When the reunification of Germany came only one year later, he reacted dispassionately: "No delight in German unity. They are bound to fool around once more, even if I won't live to see it".

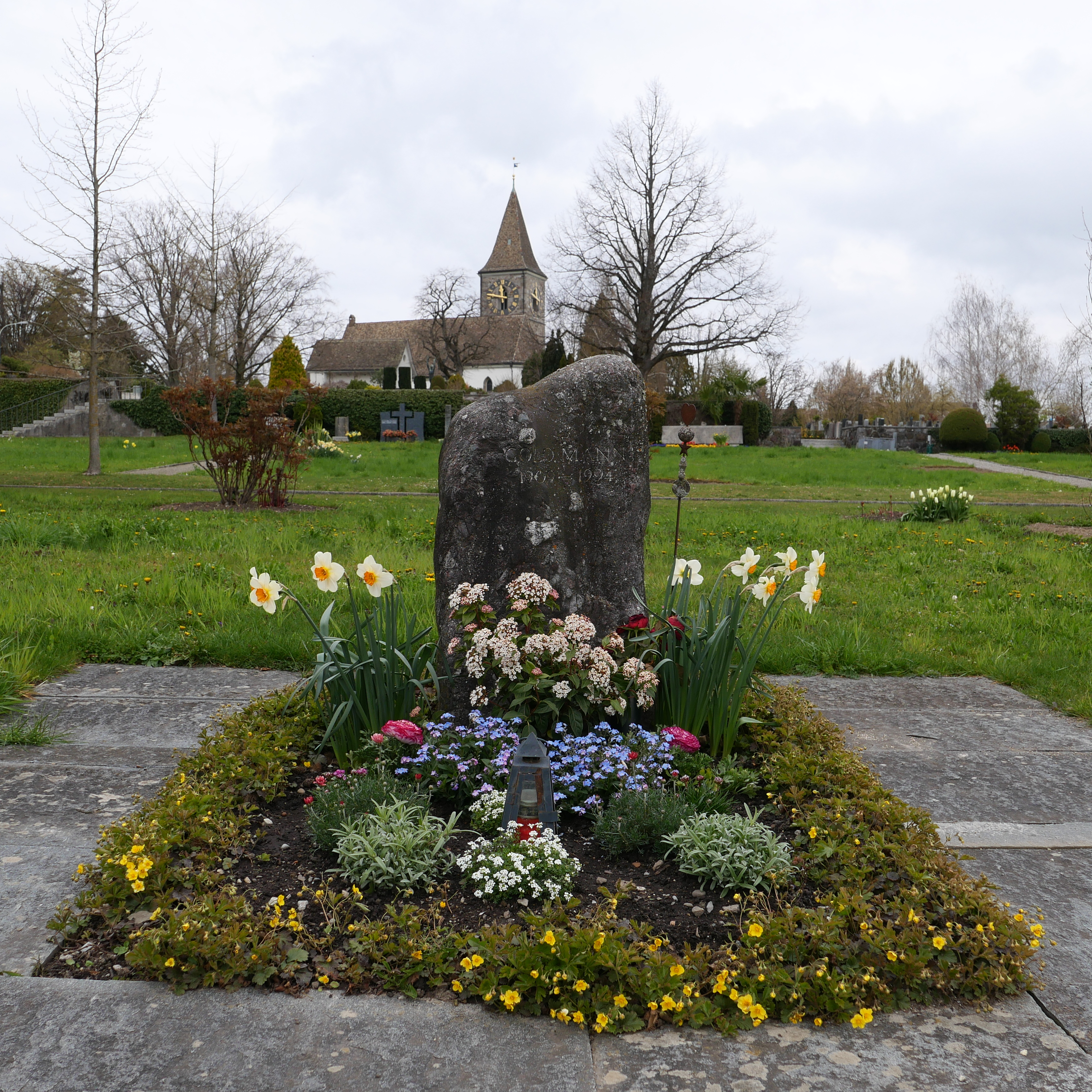
Mann's grave in Kilchberg.

In March 1990, Mann had a heart attack after a public lecture. In the same year it became evident that he suffered from prostate cancer. Because of his ill health he moved to Leverkusen in 1992, where he was nursed by Ingrid Beck-Mann, the widow of his adopted son Hans. A few days prior to his death, he acknowledged his homosexuality in a TV interview: "I did not fall in love often. I often kept it to myself, maybe that was a mistake. It also was forbidden, even in America, and one had to be a little careful". According to Tilman Lahme's biography, although Golo Mann did not act out his homosexuality as openly as his brother Klaus Mann he had had love relationships since his student days.

On 7 April 1994, Mann died in Leverkusen aged 85. His urn was buried in Kilchberg, but—in fulfillment of his last will—outside the family grave.

Golo Mann's literary estate is archived in the Swiss Literary Archives in Bern. In 2009 the German Postal system honoured the 100th anniversary of Golo Mann's birth with a new stamp, which displayed his portrait with the caption Literarischer Historiker (literary historian).

== Works ==
- 1947 Friedrich von Gentz. Secretary of Europe: The Life of Friedrich Gentz, Enemy of Napoleon. Yale University Press (1946).
- 1958 Deutsche Geschichte des 19. und 20. Jahrhunderts. The History of Germany Since 1789. Praeger Publishers (1968).
- 1964 Wilhelm II
- 1965 Thomas Mann: Memories of my Father and Translations of Thomas Mann's Works — a Bibliography. Bonn: Inter Nationes.
- 1970 Von Weimar nach Bonn. Fünfzig Jahre deutsche Republik
- 1971 Wallenstein. Wallenstein, His Life Narrated. Holt, Rinehart and Winston (1976).
- 1986 Erinnerungen und Gedanken. Eine Jugend in Deutschland. Reminiscences and Reflections: A Youth in Germany. W. W. Norton & Company (1990).
- 1989 Wir alle sind, was wir gelesen
- 1992 Wissen und Trauer
- 2009 Man muss über sich selbst schreiben. Erzählungen, Familienporträts, Essays. Herausgegeben vn Tilmann Lahme. Frankfurt am Main: S. Fischer Verlag.

== See also ==
- Dohm–Mann family tree
