= Alfred Pringsheim =

German mathematician (1850–1941)

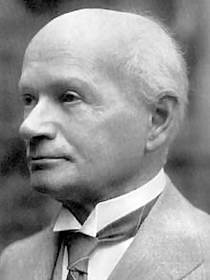
- Born: 2 September 1850; Ohlau, Silesia Province
- Died: 25 June 1941 (aged 90); Zürich, Switzerland
- Spouse: Hedwig Dohm (m. 1878)
- Children: 5, including Klaus, Katia and Heinz
- Scientific career
- Fields: Mathematics

Alfred Pringsheim (2 September 1850 – 25 June 1941) was a German mathematician and patron of the arts. He was the father-in-law of the author and Nobel Prize winner Thomas Mann.

== Family and academic career ==
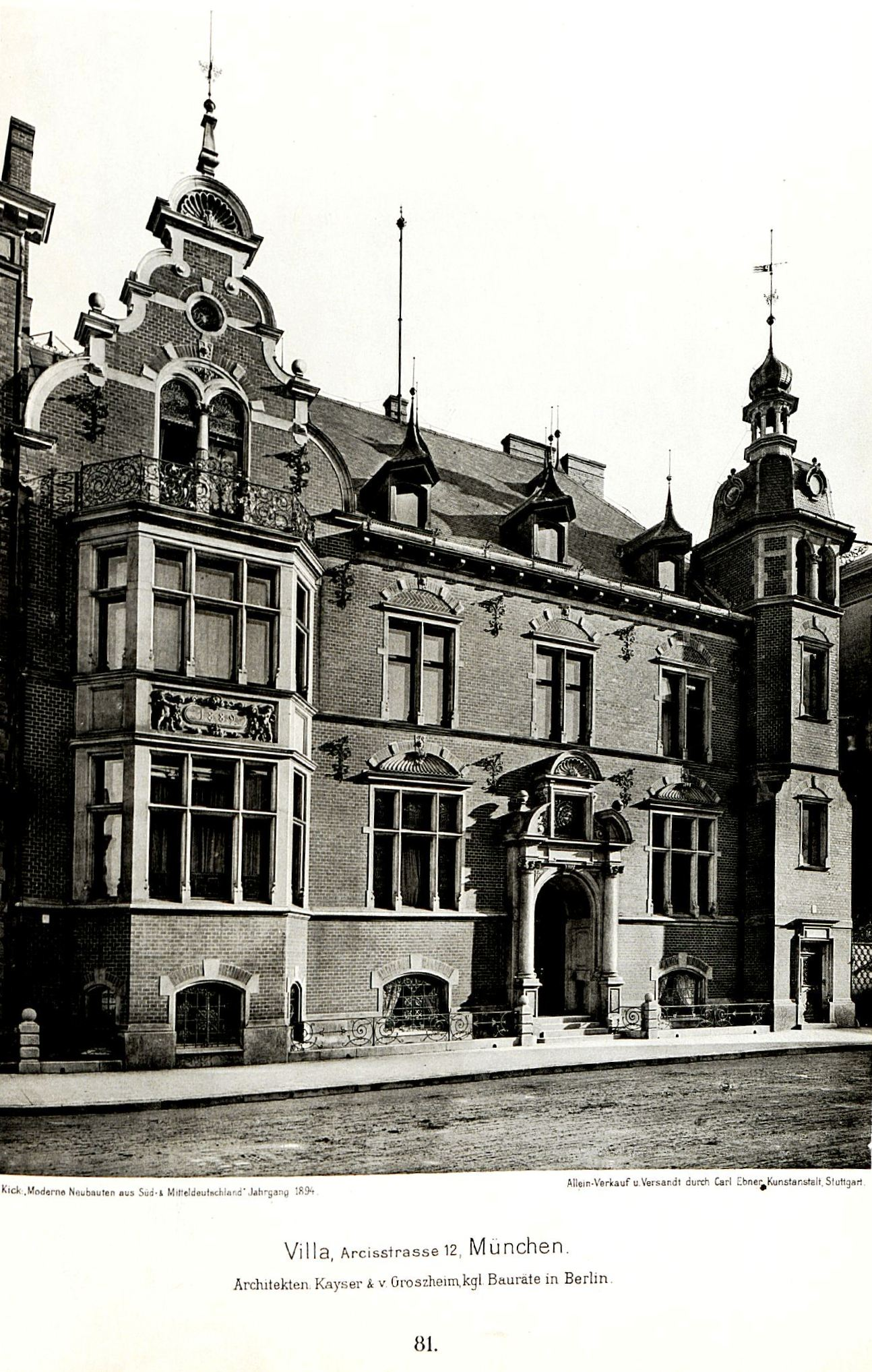
He moved into "Pringsheim Palace" at 12 Arcis Street, Munich, in 1889.

Pringsheim was born in Ohlau, Province of Silesia (now Oława, Poland). He came from an extremely wealthy Silesian merchant family with Jewish roots. He was the first-born child and only son of the Upper Silesian railway entrepreneur and coal mine owner Rudolf Pringsheim (1821–1901) and his wife Paula, née Deutschmann (1827–1909). He had a younger sister, Martha.

Pringsheim attended the Maria Magdalena Gymnasium in Breslau, where he excelled in music and mathematics. Starting in 1868 he studied mathematics and physics in Berlin and at the Ruprecht Karl University in Heidelberg. In 1872 he was awarded a doctorate in mathematics, studying under Leo Königsberger. In 1875, he moved from Berlin, where his parents lived, to Munich to earn his habilitation. Two years later he became a lecturer at the Ludwig-Maximilians-Universität München (LMU) in Munich.

In 1886 Pringsheim was appointed associate professor of mathematics there, and in 1901 full professor. He retired as emeritus professor in 1922. He was elected a member of the Bavarian Academy of Sciences in 1898, a position he held until 1938, and was a corresponding member of the Göttingen Academy of Sciences. He was also awarded membership in the Leopoldina, Germany's oldest academy of natural sciences.

Pringsheim considered himself to be a German citizen who no longer followed the "Mosaic belief" (meaning conservative or orthodox Judaism). He repeatedly declined to have himself baptized.

In 1878 Pringsheim married the Berlin actress Gertrude Hedwig Anna Dohm (1855–1942), whose mother was the Berlin advocate of women's rights Hedwig Dohm (1831–1919). They had five children: Erik (1879–1909), Peter (born 1881), Heinz (born 1882) and twins born in 1883, Klaus and Katharina, known as Katia. His first-born son, Erik, was exiled to Argentina because of his dissolute life and gambling debts and died there at an early age. His sons Peter and Klaus followed him in pursuing academic careers, obtaining professorships in physics and musical composition. One musician in the family was enough, so his third son, Heinz, became an archaeologist with a doctorate in that field, but soon changed course, becoming a successful conductor and critic in Berlin and Munich. His daughter Katia was the first female in Munich to earn the qualifications for university admission and was one of the first active women students at LMU Munich. She later became the wife of the author and Nobel Prize winner Thomas Mann.

In 1889 Pringsheim and his family moved into a Neo-Renaissance villa at Arcisstrasse 12 designed by the Berlin architects Kayser & von Großheim with interior furnishings provided by Joh. Wachter and the court furniture manufacturer O. Fritsche of Munich. On major social nights the Munich elite was hosted here in what was known as the Pringsheim Palace. There he had the Romantic painter Hans Thoma, of similar political affiliation, decorate the music room.

Besides mathematics, ever since his youth Pringsheim was also intensively occupied with music, and adapted various compositions of Richard Wagner for the piano.

Later he became interested in the theory and history of art, building up important collections of majolica earthenware and silver. His was the largest and most important private collection of majolica in Germany consisting of 440 pieces. He also collected enamels, stained-glass panels, tapestries, and paintings by Franz von Lenbach.

In his novel Royal Highness, Thomas Mann portrayed his father-in-law as the character Samuel Spoelman.

Pringsheim at the Fourth Conference International Union for Cooperation in Solar Research at Mount Wilson Observatory, 1910

== Mathematical investigations ==
In mathematical analysis, Pringsheim studied real and complex functions, following the power-series-approach of the Weierstrass school. Pringsheim published numerous works on the subject of complex analysis, with a focus on the summability theory of infinite series and the boundary behavior of analytic functions.

One of Pringsheim's theorems, according to Hadamard earlier proved by E. Borel, states that a power series with positive coefficients and radius of convergence equal to 1 has necessarily a singularity at the point 1. This theorem is used in analytic combinatorics and the Perron–Frobenius theory of positive operators on ordered vector spaces.

Another theorem named after Pringsheim gives an analyticity criterion for a C^{∞} function on a bounded interval, based on the behaviour of the radius of convergence of the Taylor expansion around a point of the interval. However, Pringsheim's original proof had a flaw (related to uniform convergence), and a correct proof was provided by Ralph P. Boas.

Pringsheim and Ivan Śleszyński, working separately, proved what is now called the Śleszyński–Pringsheim theorem on convergence of certain continued fractions.

Besides his research in analysis, Pringsheim also wrote articles for the Enzyklopädie der mathematischen Wissenschaften on the fundamentals of arithmetic and on number theory. He published papers in the Mathematische Annalen. As an officer of the Bayerische Akademie der Wissenschaften, he recorded the minutes of its scientific meetings.

He also proved a significant part of the Abel–Dini–Pringsheim theorem, a convergence test for a series in which the nth term is divided by the nth partial sum.

== Acquaintance with the Wagner family ==
Pringsheim had a deep, early interest in music and was especially fascinated by the works of Richard Wagner. He corresponded with Wagner personally, and he took Wagner's letters with him when he went into exile to Switzerland. His musical inclinations led to the publication of several arrangements of Wagner's work, and he also wrote on subjects in the field of music.

His association with Wagner was so intense that Pringsheim supported Wagner financially to a significant extent, and also backed the Bayreuth music festival. In gratitude, he received a certificate designating him as a patron, which guaranteed him a seat at certain performances. In her memoirs about this acquaintance with Wagner, his granddaughter, Erika Mann, wrote that Prof. Pringsheim was even once involved in a duel because someone had insulted Wagner.

== Financial situation ==
His family's fortune left Pringsheim a wealthy man. He also had a sizeable monthly income as a full professor at the university. After the death of the family patriarch in 1913 he had at his disposal assets amounting to 13 million marks and an annual income of 800,000 marks, which is today equivalent to €10.5 million and €646,000, respectively.

Pringsheim's financial decline began with World War I. As a “German patriot” he subscribed to war loans which lost their nominal value after the war, which meant the loss of a major part of his capital. The disastrous inflation of 1923 and 1924 resulted in additional high losses. As a result, he had to sell part of his art collection, which probably included a mural by Hans Thoma. He commented, ironically, “I live from wall to mouth”. He also had to sell his marvellous mathematics library which contained many precious books dating back to the sixteenth century. The auction catalogue is still preserved in the Bayerische Staatsbibliothek.

== Nazi persecution ==
When the Nazis came to power in 1933, Pringsheim was persecuted because of his Jewish origins. In 1933, the Nazis seized the Pringsheim Palace. In 1934, he refused to take a loyalty oath to Hitler's Nazi government. The Pringheim's passports were canceled by the Nazi authorities in early 1937.

Primarily because of his age (he was in his mid-80s) he did not want to go abroad, as did most of his family, and remained in Germany. One of many antisemitic pieces of Nazi legislation, the Namensänderungsverordnung which came into effect 1 January 1938, forced him to legally change his name into Alfred Israel Pringsheim at age 87. At first, he was not allowed to leave the country. Winifred Wagner was not able to help the elderly Wagner devotee in this respect. Through the intervention of the then-rector of LMU Munich, his former neighbor Karl Haushofer, who was a friend of Rudolf Hess, and the professor of mathematics Oskar Perron, one of Alfred Pringsheim's former students, as well as through the initiative of a courageous member of the SS who arranged for passports at the last minute, he and his wife were able to leave for Zürich, Switzerland on 31 October 1939 after suffering further grave humiliations.

During Kristallnacht, in November 1938, the SS seized Pringsheim's maiolica collection from his home in Munich. His world famous collection of majolica was sold in a forced sale by the Nazis at Sotheby's in London in 1939 in exchange for permission to emigrate. The fate of his goldsmith collection is less well known.

Pringsheim's house was forceably sold to the Nazi party. It was torn down and replaced by a party administration building. The files of all German Nazi party members were stored there until 1945. Today it houses the Institute of Art History of LMU Munich and the offices of the Munich State Collection of Antiquities, among others entities.

Pringsheim died on 25 June 1941 in Zürich. His wife then apparently burned all of the personal effects which had been brought to Switzerland, including the letters from Richard Wagner. She died one year later.

== Restitution claims ==
Pringheim's heirs have requested that artworks looted by the Nazis and sold in forced sales be returned to the family. According to Christie's some of the works were restituted in 1953. However, other sources specify that there was a financial settlement with the German government. In 2008 Pringheim's heirs asked the Museum Boijmans Van Beuningen Foundation to restitute to them seven pieces of Italian maiolica that the museum had acquired by the collector J.N. Bastert. Research into paintings and other objects is ongoing. More than 400 artworks are registered with the German Lost Art Foundation in its Lostart database.

== Publications ==
- Entehrt. Ausgeplündert. Arisiert: Entrechtung und Enteignung der Juden 2005
- Daniel Bernoulli – Versuch einer neuen Theorie der Wertbestimmung von Glücksfällen, 1896
- Irrationalzahlen und Konvergenz unendlicher Prozesse, Leipzig 1898
- Über Wert und angeblichen Unwert der Mathematik – Address presented at a public meeting of the royal Bavarian Academy of Sciences, Munich, on the occasion of the 145th Endowment Day on 14 March 1904
- Uber Konvergenz und Funktionentheoretischen Charakter Gewisser Limitar-Periodischer Kettenbruche, Munich 1910
- Majolica, Leiden 1910
- Über den Taylorschen Lehrsatz für Funktionen einer reellen Veränderlichen, offprint of the Royal Academy of Sciences, 1913
- Majolikasammlung Alfred Pringsheim in München, Leiden 1914
- Vorlesungen über Zahlenlehre – first volume, part 2 (I.2) Unendliche Reihen mit Reellen Gliedern, Leipzig 1916
- Über singuläre Punkte gleichmässiger Konvergenz – presented on 6 December 1919 in Munich at the Bavarian Academy of Sciences (Minutes of the Bavarian Academy of Sciences, Mathematical-Physical Division; offprint 1919)
- Grundlagen der allgemeinen Funktionenlehre
- Vorlesungen über Funktionslehre. Erste Abteilung: Grundlagen der Theorie der analytischen Funktionen einer komplexen Veränderlichen, Leipzig and Berlin 1925
- Vorlesungen über Zahlen- und Funktionenlehre, 2 vol. (Bibliotheca Mathematica Teubneriana, volumes 28,29). Leipzig, 1916–1932
- Kritisch-historische Bemerkungen zur Funktionentheorie, Reprint 1986 ISBN 3-7696-4071-3

== Films ==
- Frau Thomas Mann, film script and director: Birgit Kienzle, first broadcast: ARD, 9 August 2005
- Die Manns – Ein Jahrhundertroman, film script: Horst Königstein and Heinrich Breloer, director: Heinrich Breloer, WDR 2001

== See also ==
- Dohm–Mann family tree
- Vivanti–Pringsheim theorem
- Aryanization
- Nazi plunder
- List of Claims for Restitution for Nazi-looted art

== Sources ==
- Ernst Klee, Das Kulturlexikon zum Dritten Reich, Frankfurt/Main 2007
- Franz Neubert (Hrsg.), Deutsches Zeitgenossen-Lexikon, Leipzig 1905
- Hermann A.L. Degener, Wer ist's, Leipzig 1911
- Hermann A.L. Degener, Wer ist's, Berlin 1935
- Tilmann Lahme, "Von der Wand in den Mund – Ordnung und spätes Leid im Haus der Schwiegereltern Thomas Manns: Die Pringsheims im Münchner Jüdischen Museum", artikel in the Frankfurter Allgemeine Zeitung dated 7 April 2007
