= Elisabeth Mann Borgese =

Canadian German-born expert in maritime law, ecologist

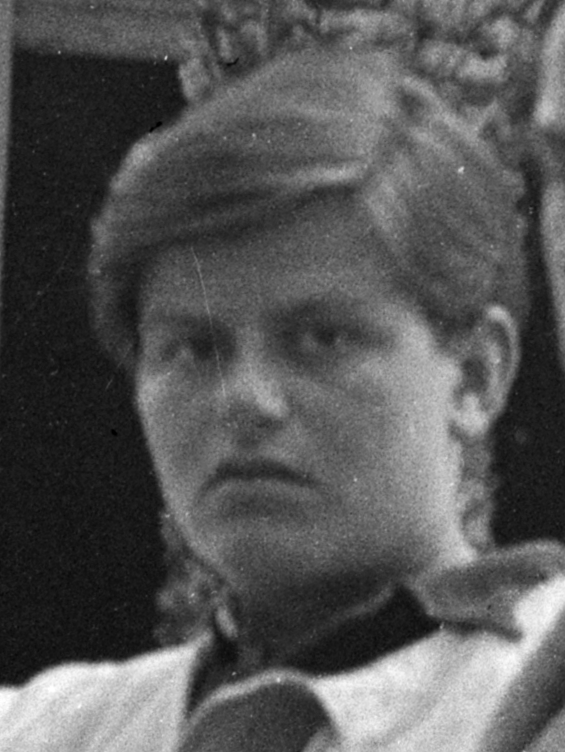
- Mann in 1936
- Born: Elisabeth Veronika Mann; 24 April 1918; Munich, German Empire
- Died: 8 February 2002 (aged 83); St. Moritz, Switzerland
- Citizenship: Germany, Czechoslovakia, United States, Canada
- Occupations: Environmentalist, political scientist and writer
- Spouse: Giuseppe Antonio Borgese (m. 1939; died 1952)
- Partner: Corrado Tumiati (1953–1967)
- Parents: Thomas Mann (father); Katia Mann (mother)
- Relatives: Erika Mann (sister); Klaus Mann (brother); Golo Mann (brother); Monika Mann (sister); Michael Mann (brother)
- Awards: Order of Canada
- Writing career

Elisabeth Veronika Mann Borgese, CM (24 April 1918 – 8 February 2002) was an internationally recognized expert on maritime law and policy and the protection of the environment. Called "the mother of the oceans", she received the Order of Canada and awards from the governments of Austria, China, Colombia, Germany, the United Nations and the World Conservation Union.

Elisabeth was a child of Nobel Prize–winning German author Thomas Mann and his wife Katia Mann. Born in Germany, Elisabeth experienced displacement due to the rise of the Nazi Party and became a citizen first of Czechoslovakia, then of the United States, and finally of Canada.

Elisabeth Mann Borgese worked as a senior fellow at the Center for the Study of Democratic Institutions in Santa Barbara, California and as a university professor at Dalhousie University in Halifax, Nova Scotia, Canada. She became a proponent of international cooperation and world federalism. In 1968, she was one of the founding members – and for a long time the only female member – of the Club of Rome. In 1970 she organized the first international conference on the law of the sea, "Pacem in Maribus" ("Peace in the Oceans") in Malta, and helped to establish the International Ocean Institute (IOI) at the Royal University of Malta. From 1973 to 1982, Mann Borgese helped to develop the United Nations Convention on the Law of the Sea (UNCLOS). She also helped to establish the International Tribunal for the Law of the Sea.

== Family and citizenship ==
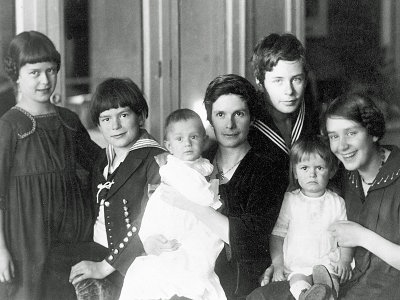
Katia Mann with children (about 1919). From left to right: Monika, Golo, Michael, Katia, Klaus, Elisabeth, Erika

Elisabeth Veronika Mann was born in Munich, Germany, the youngest daughter of Katia Pringsheim and Nobel Prize winning German author Thomas Mann. Her uncle was novelist Heinrich Mann. Her brothers and sisters are Klaus, Erika (wife of W. H. Auden), Golo, Monika and Michael Mann. She was of Jewish descent from her mother's side. Due to her being the granddaughter of Júlia da Silva Bruhns, she was also of Portuguese-Indigenous Brazilian partial descent.

The Mann family left Germany after Adolf Hitler came to power, moving first to Switzerland. On 11 February 1933, Thomas Mann and his wife Katia left Munich on what was planned as a lecture tour. Within weeks he was warned that the Nazi Party, which had recently come to power, was moving against him. His house and possessions, his published books, and initially his royalties were confiscated. Mann was warned to remain abroad but was dependent upon German citizenship for a valid passport. He began to explore the possibility of obtaining citizenship in Austria, Switzerland or Czechoslovakia.

Thomas Mann publicly indicated his opposition to the Nazi Party in an open letter to literary critic Eduard Korrodi of the Neue Zürcher Zeitung, dated 2 February 1936. On 18 August 1936, the town council of Proseč, Czechoslovakia, voted to accept Thomas Mann's application for a Certificate of Domicile. Mann's application was supported and expedited at high levels of government and as of 19 November 1936 he and other family members, including his minor children Elisabeth and Michael, were granted Czechoslovak citizenship.

Elisabeth studied piano and cello at the Conservatory of Music in Zürich, Switzerland, receiving a Bachelor of Arts degree in Classics and a diploma from the Conservatory of Music in Zurich in 1938. Among musicians, she is known for her translation of Heinrich Schenker's Harmonielehre (1906) into English. As a result of excisions by the editor, Oswald Jonas, Mann Borgese's translation Harmony (1954) is "somewhat removed from what Schenker himself actually wrote." Nonetheless, her "rough and ready" translation was for many years one of the few versions available.

On 10 February 1938, Thomas Mann travelled to the United States on a lecture tour. Following the annexation of Austria on 12 March 1938, he expressed grave concern over the appeasement policy and sought to become a citizen of the United States. Elisabeth accompanied her parents to the United States. Following the German occupation of Czechoslovakia, their Czechoslovak passports were no longer considered valid. In 1941, Thomas Mann and other family members, including Elisabeth Mann Borgese, became citizens of the United States.

At the time of her death, Elisabeth Mann Borgese was the last living child of Thomas Mann. This came to prominence with the Emmy-winning docudrama TV mini-series Die Manns – Ein Jahrhundertroman (2001), in which she was shown in interviews with director Heinrich Breloer on different locations in Europe and the United States where her family once stayed. The Frankfurter Allgemeine Zeitung described her appearance in the interviews as "unpretentious, wise and with a winning sense of humor". It marked the first time that she talked extensively about her family, and she agreed that she was the only one of the six children of Mann who felt totally reconciled with the shadow of their father.

== Marriage ==
Elisabeth Mann married the anti-fascist Italian writer and professor of literature Giuseppe Antonio Borgese (1882–1952) in 1939. They had two daughters, Angelica (born 1940) and Dominica (born 1944). Mann Borgese also had a foster son, Marcel Dechamp.

In 1952, G. A. Borgese died in Fiesole, Italy.

Elisabeth lived with psychiatrist and writer Corrado Tumiati (1885–1967) in her home in Fiesole (Florence, Italy) from 1953 until his death in 1967.

In 1967, Mann Borgese met Arvid Pardo, the UN ambassador for Malta, who later became her partner.

== University of Chicago ==
Mann Borgese moved to Chicago with her husband, who taught at the University of Chicago. With Richard McKeon and Robert Hutchins, G. A. Borgese formed the interdisciplinary Committee to Frame a World Constitution, which published a Preliminary Draft of a World Constitution in 1948. The members of the Committee at the time of the publication of the Draft were, in addition to Hutchins and Borgese, Mortimer J. Adler, Stringfellow Barr, Albert Léon Guérard, Harold Innis, Erich Kahler, Wilber G. Katz, Charles Howard McIlwain, Robert Redfield, and Rexford Tugwell. Elisabeth was the secretary of the Committee and edited its journal, Common Cause, which was published by the University of Chicago Press from 1947–1951.

In the mid-1960s, Mann Borgese worked as an editor, researcher and translator. She was editor of Intercultural Publications for the Ford Foundation from 1952 to 1964. She was for two years the executive secretary of the board of the Encyclopædia Britannica. She worked as a translator with Max Rheinstein, who helped to establish the study of comparative law in the United States. She assisted Rheinstein and Edward A. Shils in translating parts of Max Weber's Wirtschaft und Gesellschaft, published as Max Weber On Law In Economy And Society.

She experimented with writing science fiction, publishing several stories in 1959, which were collected in the anthology, To Whom It May Concern (1960). The pessimism of her speculative fiction is in strong contrast to her usual optimism. In 1963, Borgese published The Ascent of Woman, a sociological work suggesting that women were in the process of becoming "men's true equals".

== Center for the Study of Democratic Institutions ==
With Robert Hutchins and others, Elisabeth moved to the Center for the Study of Democratic Institutions in Santa Barbara, California, where she served as a senior fellow from 1964 to 1978. She wrote extensively on topics including peace, disarmament, human rights, world development, and the Law of the Sea. When the Constitution of the World was republished in 1965, Elisabeth Mann Borgese provided a critical introduction. In 1967, she began to focus specifically on marine law, working with Wolfgang Friedmann and Arvid Pardo, then Malta's Ambassador to the United States. In 1968, she published The Ocean Regime, an early proposal for an international agency tasked with the care of ocean resources including the high seas and the continental shelf. By 1970, at the age of 52, Mann Borgese had established herself as an international expert on the oceans.

She was the initiator and organizer of the first international conference on the law of the sea, held at Malta in 1970, with the title of "Pacem in Maribus" ("Peace in the Oceans"). She also helped to establish the International Ocean Institute (IOI). It now has over 20 centres around the world. In connection with this work, she appeared on the syndicated version of the television game show To Tell the Truth in the spring of 1973.

She was the founder and founding senior editor of the International Ocean Institute's primary publication, The Ocean Yearbook, which first appeared in 1978. and the editor of Ocean Frontiers (1992). She has also published short stories, children's books and a play. She was editor of Intercultural Publications from 1952 to 1964 and research associate and editor of Common Cause, at the University of Chicago (1946–52).

From 1973 to 1982, Mann Borgese formed part of the expert group of the Austrian delegation during the development of the United Nations Convention on the Law of the Sea (UNCLOS). She acted as an advisor to Ambassador Karl Wolf, who led the Austrian Delegation to UNCLOS III. She also helped to establish the International Tribunal for the Law of the Sea.

== Dalhousie University ==
In 1979, Mann Borgese accepted a one-year fellowship as the Killam Senior Fellow at Dalhousie University, in Halifax, Nova Scotia, Canada. Invited to remain, she became professor of political science at Dalhousie in 1980, and an adjunct professor of law in 1996. She taught maritime law and political science, including a special international summer program for civil servants. She continued to work internationally, including consulting for international organizations such as UNIDO, UNESCO, and the World Bank.

In 1983, Elisabeth Mann Borgese became a Canadian citizen. She lived in an A-frame house on Sambro Head, fronting the ocean, near Sambro, Nova Scotia.

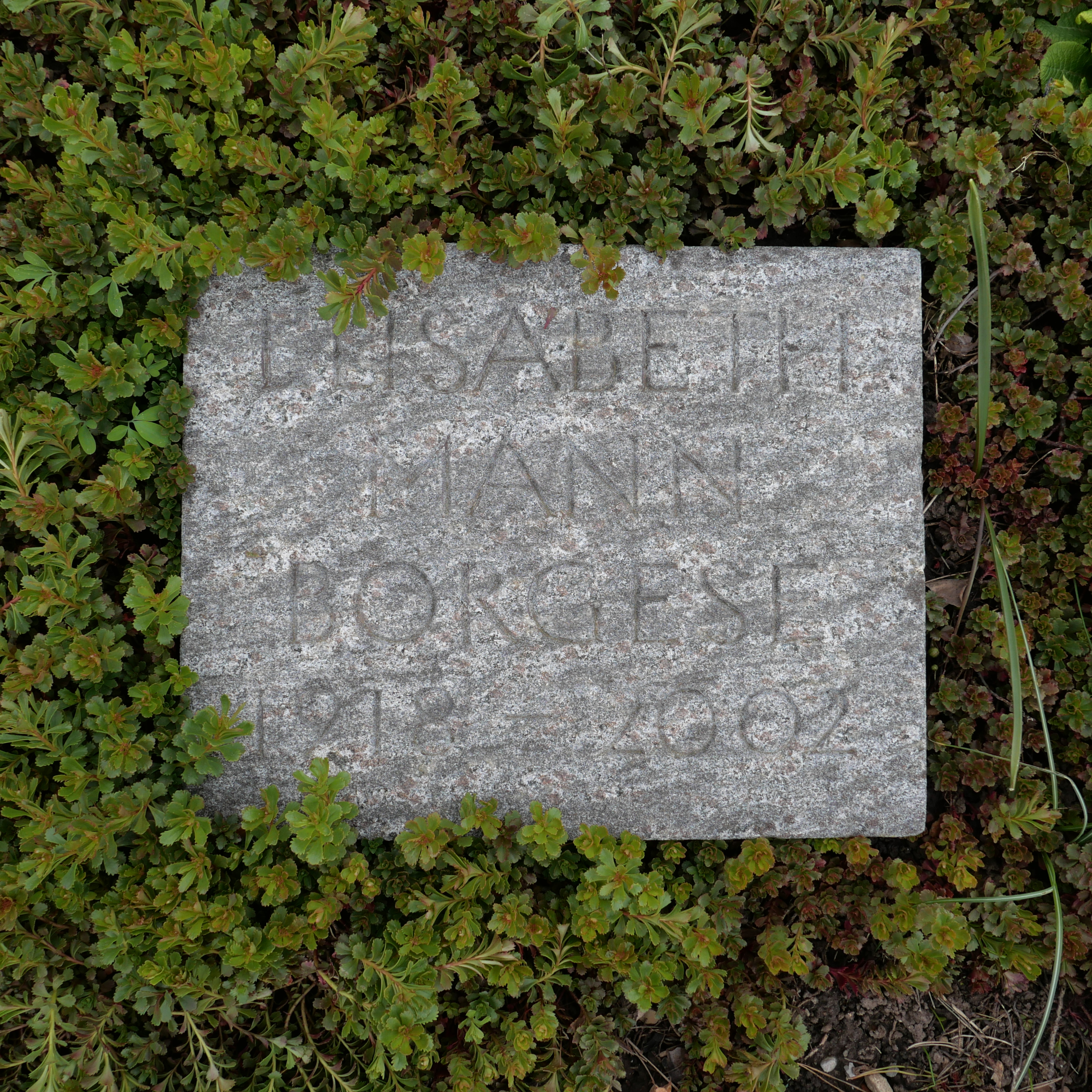
Mann Borgese's tomb in the family grave at the cemetery of Kilchberg in the Swiss canton of Zurich.

From 1987 to 1992 Mann Borgese served as chairperson of the International Centre for Ocean Development. She helped to develop programs in ocean management to train people from developing countries around the world.

== Death ==
Elisabeth Mann Borgese died unexpectedly on 8 February 2002, at the age of 83, during a skiing holiday in St. Moritz, Switzerland.

"She really was a pioneer, a utopian in some ways, but she linked these aims with real politics, to policy and hard work. And she pushed that process ahead for 30 years. She lived a remarkable life."– Holger Pils, Lübecker Museen

== Awards and honours ==
- 1982, Cross for High Merit, Government of Canada
- 1988, Order of Canada, Governor General of Canada. Her citation for this award read:

A true citizen of the world, she has been involved with a number of global issues and has been a trusted spokesperson and defender of the rights of Third World countries. Currently Associate Director of the Lester Pearson Institute for International Development and an advocate of international co-operation, she is recognized as an authority on the Law of the Sea and is respected for her undisputed knowledge, her outstanding leadership abilities and her commitment to a better future for all – Governor General of Canada

- 1987, United Nations Sasakawa Prize for the Environment
- 1988, Gold Medal, Foundation for International Studies, Malta
- 1992, Order of Colombia, Government of Colombia
- 1993, St. Francis of Assisi International Environment Prize
- 1996, Order of Merit of the Federal Republic of Germany
- 1999, Gold Medal Muenchen Leuchtet, City of Munich, Germany
- 1999, Caird Medal, National Maritime Museum, Greenwich, London, England
- 2001, Mann Borgese was nominated, with the International Ocean Institute, for a Nobel Peace Prize, but did not receive the award.
- 2002, Großes Bundesverdienstkreuz (Commander's Cross of the Order of Merit), Government of Germany
- 2018, issue of a stamp by Deutsche Post in honour of the 100th anniversary of her birth
- Medal of High Merit (Hohes Verdienstkreuz, Grosse Ehrenzeichen für Verdienste um die Republik Österreich), Government of Austria
- Friendship Award, Government of the People's Republic of China
- Member of Honour, IUCN, The World Conservation Union

Mann Borgese received a number of honorary degrees, including an honorary Doctor of Humanities from Mount St. Vincent University in Halifax (1986), one from Concordia University in Montreal in 1997, and a Doctor of Laws degree from Dalhousie University in 1998, at the age of 80.

Awards given in her name include the Elisabeth-Mann-Borgese-Meerespreis, established in 2006 by the state government of Schleswig-Holstein, Germany.

== Archives ==
The Elisabeth Mann Borgese fonds, MS-2-744, Dalhousie University Archives, Dalhousie University were acquired through five different accessions, from the Estate of Elisabeth Mann Borgese (2002–2003), from the International Ocean Institute (2009), and from Betsy B. Baker (2013). Digitization of the Elisabeth Mann Borgese fonds has been supported through donations from Nikolaus Gelpke.

An exhibition focusing on her life and work, "Elisabeth Mann Borgese and the Drama of the Oceans", was developed by the Lübecker Museen's Buddenbrookhaus in Lübeck, Germany, for display in 2012 and as a visiting exhibit in 2013 in Kiel and Berlin.

== Published works ==
Mann Borgese published extensively. In addition to works dealing with international relations, the law of the sea, the environment, and world development, she wrote children's books, plays, and a study of animal communication.

=== Research and other non-fiction ===
- Borgese, Elisabeth Mann (1998). The Oceanic Circle: Governing the Seas as a Global Resource (PDF). New York: United Nations University Press. ISBN 92-808-1013-8.
- Borgese, Elisabeth Mann (1995). Ocean Governance and the United Nations. Halifax: Centre for Foreign Policy Studies, Dalhousie University. ISBN 92-808-1013-8.
- Borgese, Elisabeth Mann (1986). The Future of the Oceans. A Report to the Club of Rome. With a Preface by Alexander King. Montreal: Harvest House.
- Borgese, Elisabeth Mann (1987). Some Preliminary Thoughts on the Establishment of a World Space Organisation. Ottawa: Canadian Institute for International Peace and Security.
- Borgese, Elisabeth Mann (1985). The Mines of Neptune: Minerals and Metals from the Sea. New York: Harry N. Abrams.
- Borgese, Elisabeth Mann (1980). Seafarm: The story of aquaculture. New York: Harry N. Abrams.
- Borgese, Elisabeth Mann (1975). The drama of the oceans. New York: H.N. Abrams. ISBN 0-8109-0337-7.
- Borgese, Elisabeth Mann (1968). The ocean regime: A suggested statute for the peaceful uses of the high seas and the sea-bed beyond the limits of national jurisdiction. Santa Barbara, California: Center for the Study of Democratic Institutions.
- Borgese, Elisabeth Mann (1963). The Ascent of Woman. New York: G. Braziller. ISBN 9780307362605.
- Borgese, Elisabeth Mann (1968). The Language Barrier: Beasts and Man. New York: Holt, Rinehart and Winston.

=== Fiction ===
- The Immortal Fish (1957)
- For Sale, Reasonable (1959)
- "True Self" (1959)
- Twin's Wail (1959)
- "To Whom it May Concern" (1960)
- "My Own Utopia" (1961) (epilogue from The Ascent of Woman)

== See also ==
- Dohm–Mann family tree
