= Klaus Pringsheim Sr. =

German musician (1883–1972)

- Born: 24 July 1883; Munich, Germany
- Died: 7 December 1972 (aged 89); Tokyo, Japan
- Occupation: Musician
- Children: 1
- Parent(s): Hedwig Dohm; Alfred Pringsheim
- Relatives: Katharina Pringsheim (twin sister)

Klaus Pringsheim Sr. (24 July 1883 – 7 December 1972) was a German-born composer, conductor, music-educator and the twin brother of Katharina "Katia" Pringsheim, who married Thomas Mann in 1905.

== Biography ==
Pringsheim was the son of mathematician and artist Alfred Pringsheim and his wife Hedwig Dohm Pringsheim, who was an actress in Berlin before her marriage. His son, historian Klaus Pringsheim Jr. (23 May 1923 – 6 February 2001), attended Bunce Court School, a German Jewish refugee school in Kent, England during World War II.

A former pupil of Gustav Mahler, Pringsheim Sr. was invited to Tokyo in 1931 to become professor of music at the Tokyo National University of Fine Arts and Music. Known for establishing and propagating Western classical music in Japan, Pringsheim had a great influence on many later Japanese musicians. Among his famous students are Kōmei Abe, Kozaburo Hirai and Isotaro Sugata.

== See also ==
- Dohm–Mann family tree
