= Katia Mann =

German wife of Thomas Mann

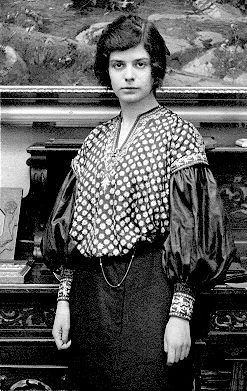
- Katia in 1905
- Born: Katharina Hedwig Pringsheim; 24 July 1883; Feldafing near Munich, German Empire
- Died: 25 April 1980 (aged 96); Kilchberg, Zürich, Switzerland
- Spouse: Thomas Mann (m. 1905; died 1955)
- Children: Erika, Klaus, Golo, Monika, Elisabeth, Michael
- Parent(s): Hedwig Dohm; Alfred Pringsheim
- Relatives: Klaus Pringsheim Sr. (twin brother)

Katia Mann (born Katharina Hedwig Pringsheim; 24 July 1883 – 25 April 1980) was the youngest child and only daughter (among four sons) of the German Jewish mathematician and artist Alfred Pringsheim and his wife Hedwig Pringsheim, who was an actress in Berlin before her marriage. Katia was also a granddaughter of the writer and women's rights activist Hedwig Dohm. Her twin brother Klaus was a conductor, composer and music pedagogue, active in Germany and Japan. She married the writer Thomas Mann.

== Life ==
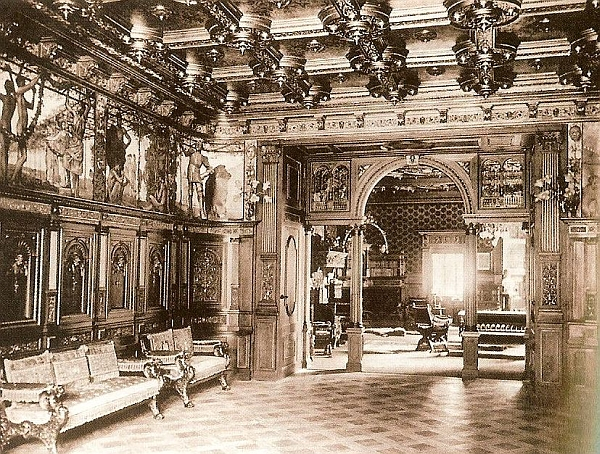
Katia's childhood home, Pringsheim Palace, Munich

Katia was born in Feldafing near Munich, into one of the wealthiest families in Germany. She was the granddaughter of German-Jewish industrialist Rudolf Pringsheim and the great-niece of the banker Hugo Pringsheim. At the age of 21, in the fall of 1904, she aborted her studies of physics and mathematics at the request of her mother and aunt, to marry the writer Thomas Mann on 11 February 1905, in Munich. She continued her studies as a guest student for another four semesters. Katia and Thomas Mann had six children (see section "Children" infra). Katia later converted to her husband's Lutheranism.

=== Children ===
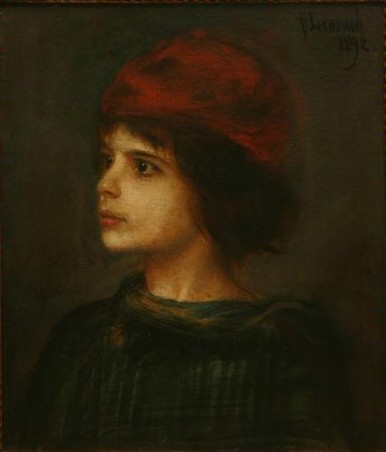
Portrait of Katia Pringsheim as a child, Franz von Lenbach

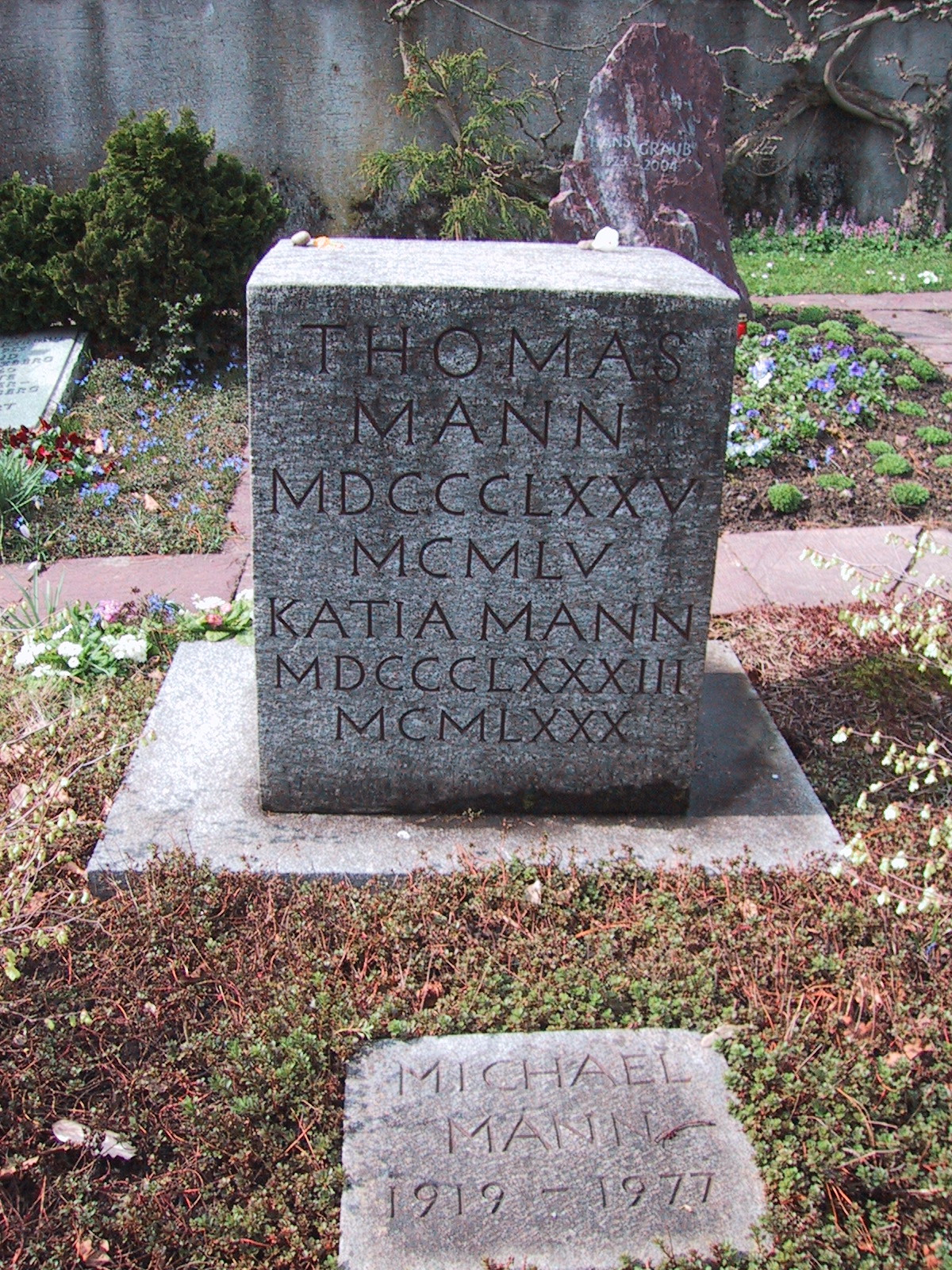
The tomb of Katia, Thomas and Michael Mann, in Kilchberg

Name	Birth	Death
Erika	9 November 1905	27 August 1969
Klaus	18 November 1906	21 May 1949
Angelus ("Golo")	27 March 1909	7 April 1994
Monika	7 June 1910	17 March 1992
Elisabeth	24 April 1918	8 February 2002
Michael	21 April 1919	1 January 1977

== Illness, exile and death ==
Katia Mann became ill in autumn 1911, a year after Monika's birth. The illness was first suspected to be tuberculosis, but X-ray examinations found no evidence of the disease. Her mother, Hedwig, put the illness down to exhaustion. Katia had given birth to four children and suffered two miscarriages in less than five years. In addition, she typed for her husband and arranged his appointments on top of the tasks of a large household. Hedwig realised that her daughter needed rest, and in January 1912, Katia was one of the first patients to be admitted to the Wald Sanatorium in Davos, Switzerland. Thomas Mann's visits to her there inspired his novel The Magic Mountain. Up to May 1914, Katia spent several months in sanatoriums, which (according to her) strengthened her so that she could "stand it all".

While the Mann family lived in exile, Katia Mann continued to take care of her six children and husband. She was not just a strong woman but a unifying figure that kept the family together. She educated her children and was her husband's office manager. She outlived three of her children (Klaus, Erika and Michael) and her husband. She died in Kilchberg near Zürich.

Thomas Mann made a sort of "portrait" of her in his novel Royal Highness.

== See also ==
- Dohm–Mann family tree
