= Brecht (film) =

2019 film directed by Heinrich Breloer

- Directed by: Heinrich Breloer
- Written by: Heinrich Breloer
- Starring: Tom Schilling; Burghart Klaußner; Lou Strenger; Adele Neuhauser; Mala Emde; Friederike Becht; Leonie Benesch; Trine Dyrholm; Franz Hartwig; Anatole Taubman; Thimo Meitner; Anna Herrmann; Maria Dragus; Laura de Boer
- Cinematography: Gernot Roll
- Edited by: Claudia Wolscht
- Music by: Hans-Peter Ströer
- Production companies: Bavaria Fiction in collaboration with WDR, BR, SWR etc.
- Release date: 2019
- Running time: 180 minutes
- Countries: Germany, Austria, Czech Republic
- Language: German

Brecht is a 2019 docudrama film, dealing with the life and work of the German playwright Bertolt Brecht. A co-production between Bavaria Fiction in Germany, Satel Film in Austria and MIA Film in the Czech Republic, principal photography occurred in and around Prague from 30 May to 28 July 2017. Formed of two 90-minute parts, it was scripted and directed by Heinrich Breloer, with Tom Schilling and Burghart Klaußner in the title role. It premiered at the Berlinale 2019.

== Plot ==
The film focusses more on Brecht's relationships with women (namely Paula Banholzer, Marianne Zoff, Helene Weigel, Elisabeth Hauptmann, Ruth Berlau, Käthe Reichel, Regine Lutz and Isot Kilian) than on his plays and poems. It does not mention the term epic theatre (though rehearsal scenes in Part 2 illustrate his working process with the Berliner Ensemble) and his years of exile are skipped – Bresloer has written:

"Naturally I would also like to have treated his exile. But that would have been a very particular film and there wasn't enough budget or airtime for it. In my novel about the film, however, exile does come up, especially his time with Margarete Steffin."

Part of the film consists of an account by Martin Pohl, one of Brecht's Masters students, who was imprisoned for two years – it tells how he was tortured by sleep deprivation and gave a false confession.

=== Part 1 ===
This deals with Brecht's time in Augsburg, Munich and Berlin before his exile. "I'll come right behind Goethe" muses the slight and shy-looking 17-year-old schoolboy to his young love Paula, wanting to be the latest genius. His friends laugh with him at his presumptuousness and yet believe him.

=== Part 2 ===
This mainly deals with his life and work in East Berlin after his return from exile, such as his work with the SED regime in East Germany. This includes the SED central committee's 1953 plan to hand over the Theater am Schiffbauerdamm to the Kasernierten Volkspolizei ensemble (later known as the Erich-Weinert-Ensemble) and Brecht's successful appeal to Otto Grotewohl against this. That venue has thus housed the Berliner Ensemble (founded by Brecht and Weigel in 1949) since 1954.

== Cast ==
- Tom Schilling: Brecht as a young man
- Burghart Klaußner: Brecht as an older man in the post-war period
- Lou Strenger: Helene Weigel as a young woman
- Adele Neuhauser: Helene Weigel as an older woman
- Mala Emde: Paula Banholzer, Brecht's first love
- Friederike Becht: Marianne Zoff, Brecht's first wife
- Leonie Benesch: Elisabeth Hauptmann, Brecht's translator and collaborator
- Trine Dyrholm: Ruth Berlau, Brecht's Danish lover and collaborator
- Franz Hartwig: Caspar Neher, a friend of Brecht
- Anatole Taubman: Ernst Josef Aufricht, director of the Theater am Schiffbauerdamm
- Thimo Meitner: Walter Brecht, Brecht's brother
- Anna Herrmann: Käthe Reichel
- Maria Dragus: Regine Lutz
- Laura de Boer: Isot Kilian
