= Gernot Roll =

German cinematographer (1939–2020)

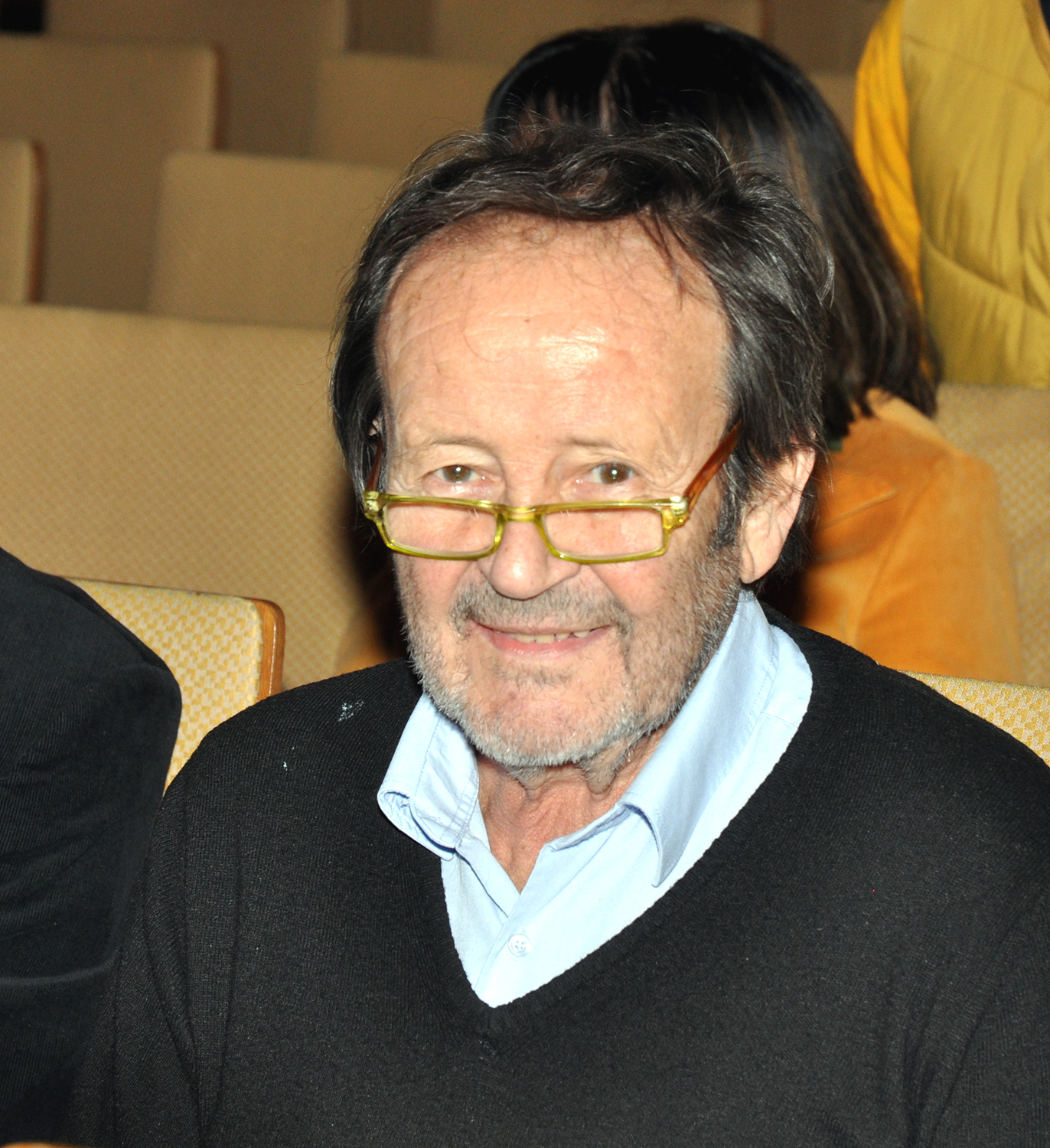
- Gernot Roll in 2015
- Born: 9 April 1939; Dresden, Germany
- Died: 12 November 2020 (aged 81); Munich, Germany
- Occupations: Cinematographer; Film director; Script writer
- Awards: Grimme-Preis; Deutscher Filmpreis; Deutscher Kamerapreis; Order of Merit of the Federal Republic of Germany; Bavarian Film Awards

Gernot Roll (9 April 1939 – 12 November 2020) was a German cinematographer, film director and script writer. He collaborated on several films with directors Edgar Reitz and Sönke Wortmann. He was regarded as an expert on literary adaptations and film biographies, such as The Buddenbrooks, filming Thomas Mann's novel in eleven television episodes directed by Franz Peter Wirth, and the same work again in 2008 in the film directed by Heinrich Breloer.

== Life ==
Roll was born in Dresden and grew up in Pirna. At the age of 14 he began training as a cameraman and then worked at the DEFA Studios in Berlin-Babelsberg. His first film as a camera assistant was the fairy tale film The Singing Ringing Tree. In 1960 he went to West Germany to work at Bavaria Film in Munich. He filmed literary works such as Geschlossene Gesellschaft, and television series such as Graf Yoster gibt sich die Ehre and Tatort. From 1976, he worked as a freelance cinematographer. He was considered an expert in literary adaptations and film biographies. In 1979, he was the cinematographer for The Buddenbrooks, eleven episodes for television of Thomas Mann's novel, directed by Franz Peter Wirth.

Roll's breakthrough came with the celebrated 16-hour TV series Heimat – Eine deutsche Chronik by Edgar Reitz in 1984. Among his films were Caroline Link's Jenseits der Stille and Helmut Dietl's Rossini. He worked with Sönke Wortmann for Der bewegte Mann, with Peter Sehr for Kaspar Hauser, and with Link again for Oscar-winning Nirgendwo in Afrika (Nowhere in Africa). He also worked with directors including Jo Baier, Axel Corti and Peter Keglevic.

Roll's debut as a director was in the film Radetzkymarsch. Roll was the director for films including the children's classic The Robber Hotzenplotz in 2006. In 2008, he was the cinematographer for Heinrich Breloer's film Die Buddenbrooks.

Roll was one of the founding members of the Deutsche Filmakademie in 2003.

He was married to the producer Rita Serra-Roll; their son is the actor Michael Roll (born 1961). They lived in the Hunsrück.

Roll died on 12 November 2020 in Munich after a severe illness, at the age of 81.

== Filmography ==
Films for which Roll was the cinematographer include:

Filmography
Year	Title	Director	Notes
1970	The Last Escape	Walter Grauman	
1971–72	Salto Mortale	Michael Braun	TV series
1977	Zero Hour	Edgar Reitz	
1979	The Buddenbrooks	Franz Peter Wirth	TV series
1980	Car-napping	Wigbert Wicker	
1980	Ein Stück Himmel	Wirth	
1984	Heimat – eine deutsche Chronik	Reitz	TV series
1985	Morenga	Egon Günther	
1985	Mit meinen heißen Tränen	Fritz Lehner	
1989	The Rose Garden	Fons Rademakers	
1982	Kleine Haie	Sönke Wortmann	
1994	Der bewegte Mann	Wortmann	
1996	Das Mädchen Rosemarie	Bernd Eichinger	TV film
1996	Beyond Silence	Caroline Link	
2001	Nowhere in Africa	Link	
2001	Die Manns – Ein Jahrhundertroman	Heinrich Breloer	miniseries
2002	Jedermanns Fest	Lehner	
2005	Speer und Er	Breloer	
2008	Buddenbrooks	Breloer	
2010	Henri 4	Jo Baier	
2013	Home from Home	Reitz	
2019	Brecht	Breloer	

== Awards ==
- 1982, 1985, 1993, 2000 Grimme-Preis
- 1992, 1993, 2002 Deutscher Filmpreis – Best Cinematography
- 1998 Deutscher Kamerapreis
- 2013 Order of Merit of the Federal Republic of Germany
- 2014 Bavarian Film Awards Honorary award
