= Zoff =

Zoff is a surname. Notable people with the surname include:

- Alfred Zoff (1852–1927), Austrian painter
- Dino Zoff (born 1942), Italian football player
- Marianne Zoff (1893–1984), Austrian actress and opera singer
- Otto Zoff (1890–1963), Austrian journalist and author
- Stefano Zoff (born 1966), Italian boxer
