= Das Duo =

German crime drama television series

- Genre: Criminal drama
- Starring: Charlotte Schwab; Ann-Kathrin Kramer; Lisa Martinek; Mišel Matičević; Sólveig Arnarsdóttir; Martin Brambach
- Country of origin: Germany
- Original language: German
- No. of episodes: 24

Production
- Running time: 90 minutes

Original release
- Network: ZDF
- Release: 16 March 2002 – 12 September 2012

Das Duo was a German crime series produced by TV60Filmproduktion (Sven Burgemeister) for ZDF. The show was set in the town of Lübeck. Swiss actress Charlotte Schwab played the main role as Commissioner for Criminal Investigation Marion Ahrens, who initially works alongside Lizzy Krüger (Ann-Kathrin Kramer), and later Clara Hertz (Lisa Martinek). From 2002 until 2012, a total of 24 episodes were broadcast at irregular intervals.

In August 2012, it was announced that in September 2012, the last episode of the series would be televised. The broadcaster justified this decision by stating that the separate parties wanted to go in different directions.

In 2016, a new series of crime films called Solo für Weiss, in which Anna Maria Mühe plays the role of LKA target investigator Nora Weiss, appeared on German television.

== Characters ==
=== Marion Ahrens ===
Head of Criminal Investigation Commissioner Marion Ahrens is deeply connected to her hometown of Lübeck. Ahrens is the superior to Lizzy Krüger and Clara Hertz.

=== Lizzy Krüger ===
Detective Commissioner Lizzy Krüger moves from Hamburg to Lübeck at the beginning of the show. When she begins working in Lübeck, she is met with little love from her superior Ahrens. Her new colleague Benno Polenz (Mišel Matičević), who had been out for Krüger's position, also treats her coldly. After eleven common cases, and garnering more affection from her coworkers, Krüger leaves to take care of her family-owned breeding stallion.

=== Clara Hertz ===
Police Commissioner Clara Hertz replaces Lizzy Krüger from the twelfth case onward. She first meets her superior Ahrens in a minor car collision. Over the course of the series, she has an affair with bank director Robert Lilienthal (Roman Knižka).

== Awards ==
The fifth episode, "The Lover", was awarded the VFF TV Movie Award in 2003 (since 2009: Bernd Burgemeister TV Award).

== See also ==
- List of German television series
