= Tagaev =

Tagaev, also Tagayev (masculine, Cyrillic Тагаев) or Tagaeva (feminine, Cyrillic Тагаева) is a surname of Turkic origin. The surname is slavicised from Tagai and literally means Tagai's.

== People with the surname ==
- Abdoujapar Tagaev (1953–2017), Kyrgyzstani politician
- Bobirjon Tagaev (born 1993), Uzbekistani Muaythai practitioner
- Kalyibek Tagaev (born 1940), Kyrgyzstani composer, People's Artist of Kyrgyzstan
- Magomed Tagaev (born 1948), ideologist of Dagestani separatists
- Murataly Tagaev (born 1978), Kyrgyzstani politician
- Elman Tagaýew (born 1989), Turkmen footballer
- Ramazan Tagaev, fictional character from the film Die Kunst des Krieges
