= Reinhild Solf =

German actress and author (1940–2022)

- Born: 14 April 1940; Haldensleben, Saxony, Germany
- Died: May/June 2022
- Education: Max Reinhardt Acting Academy
- Occupations: Actress (stage and television); Novelist
- Spouse: Hans Hollmann
- Children: Anna Joséphine; Caspar Florian (d 2001)

Reinhild Solf (14 April 1940 – May/June 2022) was a German born stage and television actress and author.

== Life ==
=== Early years ===
Reinhild Solf was born in Haldensleben, a small town a short distance to the northwest of Magdeburg in Saxony. She received her drama training at the Max Reinhardt Acting Academy in West Berlin and went on to make her stage debut at the regional theatre in Hanover. This was followed by work at the Theater Lübeck and at the National Theatre (Staatliche Schauspielbühnen) in Berlin.

=== Theatre ===
In 1973, at Berlin, she played Fontanelle in Edward Bond's take on King Lear and Mrs. Frost in The Vegetable, or From President to Postman (in German "Der Präsident oder das Würstchen") by F. Scott Fitzgerald. In 1974 she embarked on a freelance career. In 1983 she took over the title role in Goethe's Stella at the Zürich Playhouse. She followed this the next year with Penthesilea by Kleist. Further roles followed at Zürich, where she remained until 1989. In 1988 she took the part of Mrs Meinhold in The Open Country by Arthur Schnitzler, and in 1989 she appeared as Lotte (Lovage) in Peter Shaffer's "Laura and Lotte". It was around this time that Solf married the theatre director Hans Hollmann.

In 1989 she joined Frank Baumbauer at the Theater Basel where the same year she appeared in the first theatre production of The Piano Teacher by Elfriede Jelinek. In 1991 she appeared at Basel in "Die Zeit und das Zimmer" by Botho Strauß, and two years later she took the title role in Victor Hugo's Lucrezia Borgia. During the next few years she worked variously at the Kleine Komödie theatre in Munich as well at theatres in Bonn, Düsseldorf, Basel and Berlin.

=== Literature ===
Reinhild Solf's first novel appeared in 1980, published by Molden Verlag of Graz, and in 1985 as a paperback by Goldmann Verlag, by this time based in Munich in West Germany. The book, entitled "Leberwurst, Käsebrot, zwo, drei vier: Ein deutsch-deutsches Märchen" ("Liver sausage, bread 'n cheese, one two three: a German to German journey") provided a fictional account of a childhood in East Germany, a theme that will have resonated with thousands of readers in the west because of the massive population shifts across the "internal frontier" that had taken place between the foundation of the two separated German states in 1949 and the erection of the Berlin Wall in 1961. The book was a commercial success and the paperback edition was reprinted in January 1987.

Her second novel, "Schmetterling" ("Butterfly") appeared in 2008 after a gap of nearly three decades. In 2011 she presented her third novel, "Schattenfrauen" ("Shadow women"), the story of three women meeting up in 2009 at the same camping place beside the Baltic Sea where they previously camped many decades before when it was a girls' holiday camp for Free German Youth members during the years of one-party dictatorship. Published by Langen Müller Verlag, this book had its debut at the 2012 Leipzig Book Fair. A film version of "Schattenfrauen" is reported to be (2016) under preparation.

=== Television ===
Solf has worked extensively as a television actress. She starred as Elisabeth of Bohemia in ZDF's four-part drama Wallenstein (1978), and later featured as Tony, a central character in the 1979 television drama based on Thomas Mann's unhurried exploration of bourgeois decline, Buddenbrooks. She has also appeared in supporting roles in three long-running television police dramas: Derrick, Der Alte and Die Männer vom K3.

== Personal life ==
Reinhild Solf was married to the theatre director Hans Hollmann. Hollmann was born in Austria and the couple lived in Basel, Switzerland for many years. The marriage produced two recorded children. Their son, Caspar Florian, was killed in an avalanche in 2001.
