= Adele Neuhauser =

Austrian actress (born 1959)

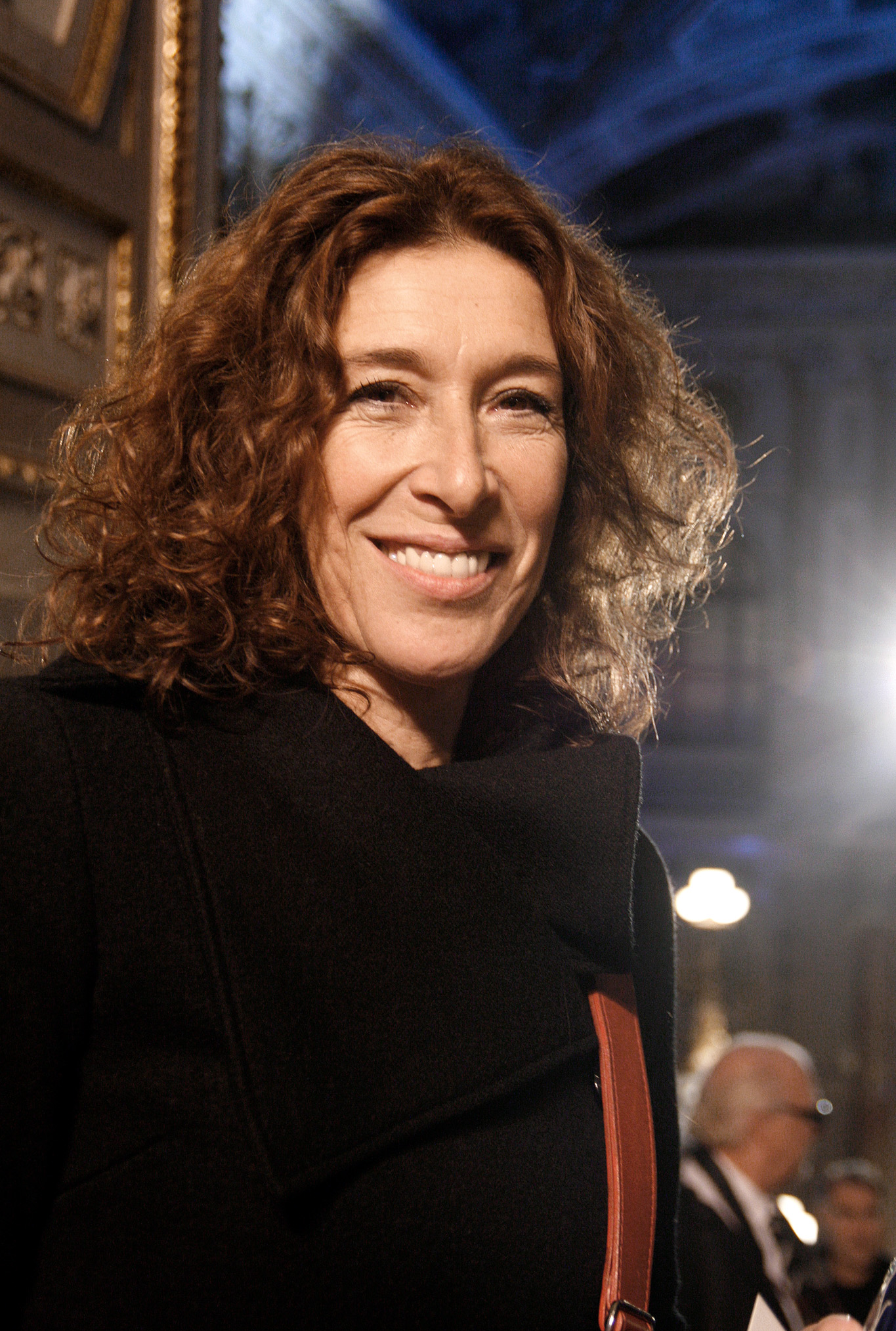
- Adele Neuhauser (2010)
- Born: 17 January 1959 (age 67); Athens, Greece

Adele Neuhauser (born 17 January 1959 in Athens, Greece) is an Austrian actress. She began her career as a theater actress. Later she also worked in television and cinema. She is a member of the Akademie des Österreichischen Films.

== Life ==
Adele Neuhauser was born in Athens but moved at the age of four with her family from Greece to Vienna, where she grew up. Her mother left the family with Neuhauser's half-brother, and Neuhauser and her brother stayed with their Greek father George. Later she grew up alone with him. At the age of ten she cut her wrist, and until the age of 21 she tried several times more to commit suicide.

After separating from her husband Zoltan Paul, Neuhauser moved to Vienna. Their son, Julian Pajzs (*1987) studied jazz guitar in Graz and in Weimar, before becoming a professional musician and composer of film music. She likes to hike, mostly on her own.

Neuhauser's grandparents from the Waldviertel were academic painters. Her brother, Peter Marquant, followed in their footsteps. The sgraffito on the Vienna Künstlerhaus were created by her grandfather. Because her grandfather was of the opinion that there should be only one painter in the family, her grandmother turned to the production of tapestry, Punch figures and worked for the Wiener Werkstätten. Her great-grandmother, although not subjected to persecution by the Nazis race laws, went voluntarily with her Jewish husband to the concentration camp where both died.

== Career ==
Neuhauser wanted to be an actress since she was six. From 1976-1978 she trained as an actor at the drama school Schauspielschule Krauss. In her early twenties she moved to Germany and began performing in theaters in Münster, Essen, Regensburg, and at the Staatstheater Mainz and occasionally also in Vienna.

Neuhauser gained nationwide attention for playing the woman Mephisto in Faust at the Stadttheater Regensburg. In addition, she also starred in movies (Helden in Tirol, Gone – eine tödliche Leidenschaft, Wo ist Fred?, Little White Lies, 3faltig) and television series (Tatort, Polizeiruf 110 and Sinan Toprak ist der Unbestechliche) and became widely known for her distinctive voice, in particular through her role of the farmer's wife Julie Zirbner in the ORF production Vier Frauen und ein Todesfall.

In 2008 Neuhauser underwent vocal cord surgery due to deposits and a Reinke's edema on the vocal cords. The pitch of her voice has thus increased a little and she has since then not been addressed on the phone as "Mr. Neuhauser".

Since 2010 she plays the alcohol-dependent former vice squad investigator Bibi Fellner who suffers from burnout syndrome and works alongside Harald Krassnitzer (as Moritz Eisner) in the Viennese production of Tatort, produced by the ORF.

== Filmography (incomplete) ==
Television

- 1978: Kottan ermittelt (Nachttankstelle), as pupil
- 1990: Der neue Mann
- 1995: Um die 30
- 1995: Kriminaltango
- 1996: Der Fahrradfahrer
- 1998: Girl's Trap – Death Comes Online
- 1998: Neonnächte – Gefahr der Großstadt
- 1999: Alphamann
- 1999: Meines Bruders Hüter
- 1999: Weg in die Dunkelheit
- 1999: Sinan Toprak ist der Unbestechliche
- 1999: Tatort – Die kleine Zeugin (SWR)
- 2001: Der Kranichmann
- 2001: Davon stirbt man nicht
- 2001: Der kleine Mann
- 2001: Zwei Engel auf Streife (series)
- 2002: Tatort – Wolf im Schafspelz (BR)
- 2003: Die Rosenheim-Cops
- 2003: Schulmädchen (RTL)
- 2003: Queen of Cherries (TV miniseries; ZDF)
- 2004: Italiener und andere Süßigkeiten (ProSieben)
- 2004: Der Weihnachtshund
- since 2005: Vier Frauen und ein Todesfall (ORF)
- 2005: Vorsicht Schwiegermutter! (ProSieben)
- 2005: Mutig in die neuen Zeiten – Im Reich der Reblaus (serial; ORF-Zeitgeschichte)
- 2005: Zwei Weihnachtshunde
- 2006: Mutig in die neuen Zeiten (serial; ORF-Zeitgeschichte)
- 2006: Wo ist Fred?
- 2007: Ich Chef, du nix
- 2007: Großstadtrevier
- 2008–2011: Doctor’s Diary (ORF/RTL)
- 2008: Ich liebe den Mann meiner besten Freundin (Sat.1)
- 2008: Tatort - Granit
- 2009: Mein Flaschengeist und Ich (RTL)
- 2009: Sturmfrei – Der Film
- 2009: Little White Lies
- 2009: London, Liebe, Taubenschlag
- 2009: Liebe Edelbitter
- 2009: Wüstenblume (voice)
- 2010: Tatort: Weil sie böse sind (HR)
- 2010: Aufschneider (ORF)
- 2010: Die Wanderhure
- 2010: Molly & Mops – Das Leben ist kein Gugelhupf (series; ORF/ZDF/mungo-film)
- since 2011: Tatort (ORF) as inspector Bibi Fellner
  - 2011: Vergeltung
  - 2011: Ausgelöscht
  - 2012: Kein Entkommen
  - 2012: Falsch verpackt
  - 2013: Zwischen den Fronten
  - 2013: Unvergessen
  - 2013: Angezählt
  - 2013: Abgründe
- 2012: The Marriage Swindler and His Wife
- 2016: Die Kunst des Krieges
- 2019: Brecht

Cinema

- 1990: The Gamblers
- 1996: Father's Day
- 1998: Helden in Tirol
- 2001: nogo
- 2004: Gone – Eine tödliche Leidenschaft
- 2010: 3faltig
- 2013: Bad Fucking

== Theater (incomplete) ==
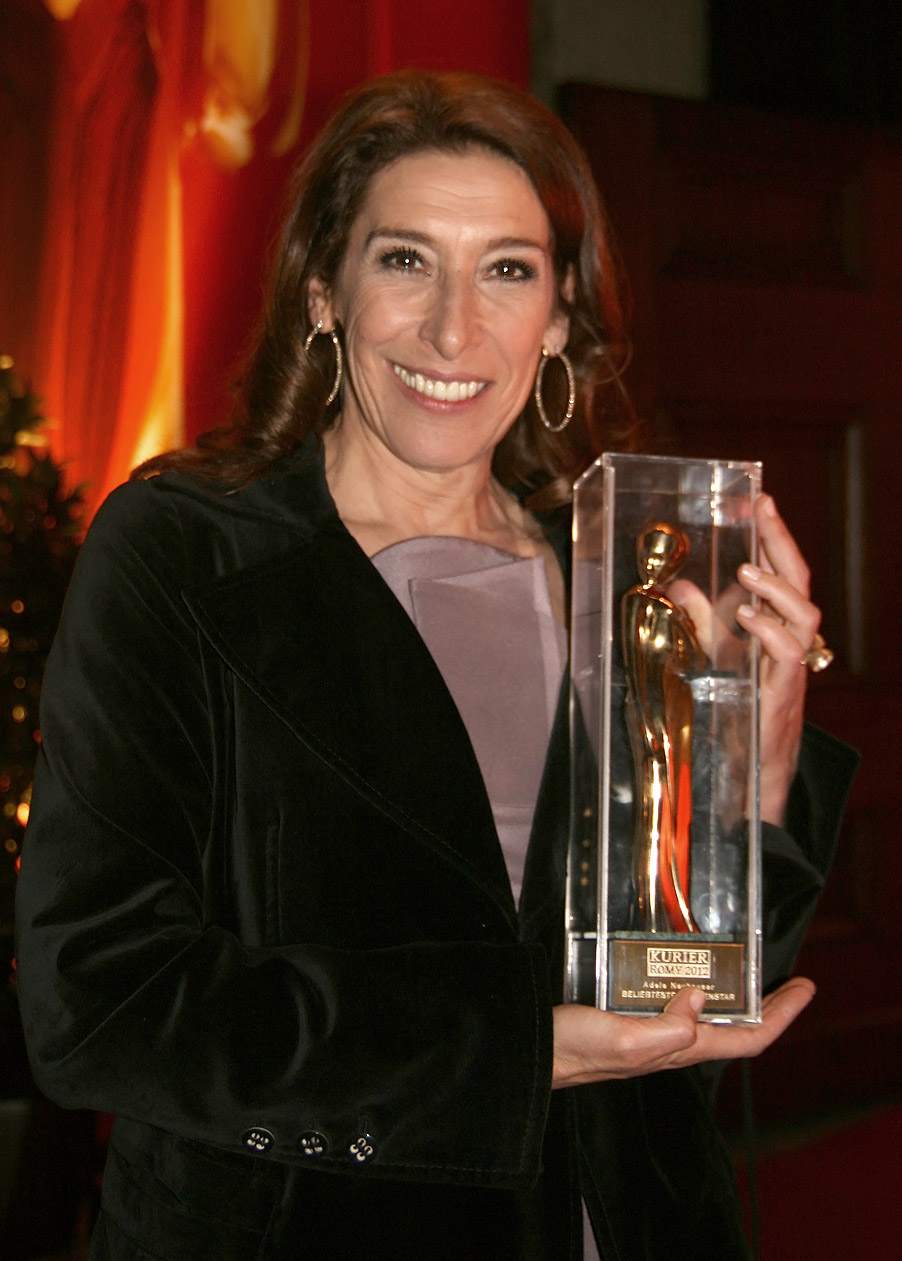
Adele Neuhauser with the ROMY 2012 as most popular actor/actress in TV series

- 1986: Nachtasyl (Grillo-Theater in Essen)
- 1990: King Ubu (Wiener Schauspielhaus)
- 1991: Medea (Staatstheater Mainz)
- 1992: Quartett (Theater Erlangen)
- 1996-1998: Präsidentinnen (Theater Erlangen)
- 1999: Maria Stuart (Theater Regensburg)
- 1999: Faust (Theater Regensburg)
- 2000: Macbeth (Theater Regensburg)
- 2000: Meisterklasse (Theater Regensburg)
- 2000: Macbeth (Theater Regensburg)
- 2000: Medea (Theater Regensburg)
- 2010/2011: Unschuldsvermutung (Rabenhof Theater, Vienna) as Karl-Heinz Grasser

== Awards ==
- 1996: Darstellerpreis Bayerische Theatertage
- 2012: Romy Film- und Fernsehpreis as Beliebteste Seriendarstellerin (most popular actor/actress in TV series)
- 2013: Romy Film- und Fernsehpreis as Beliebteste Seriendarstellerin (most popular actor/actress in TV series)
- 2014: Grimme-Preis for Tatort: Angezählt
