= Harald Krassnitzer =

Austrian actor (born 1960)

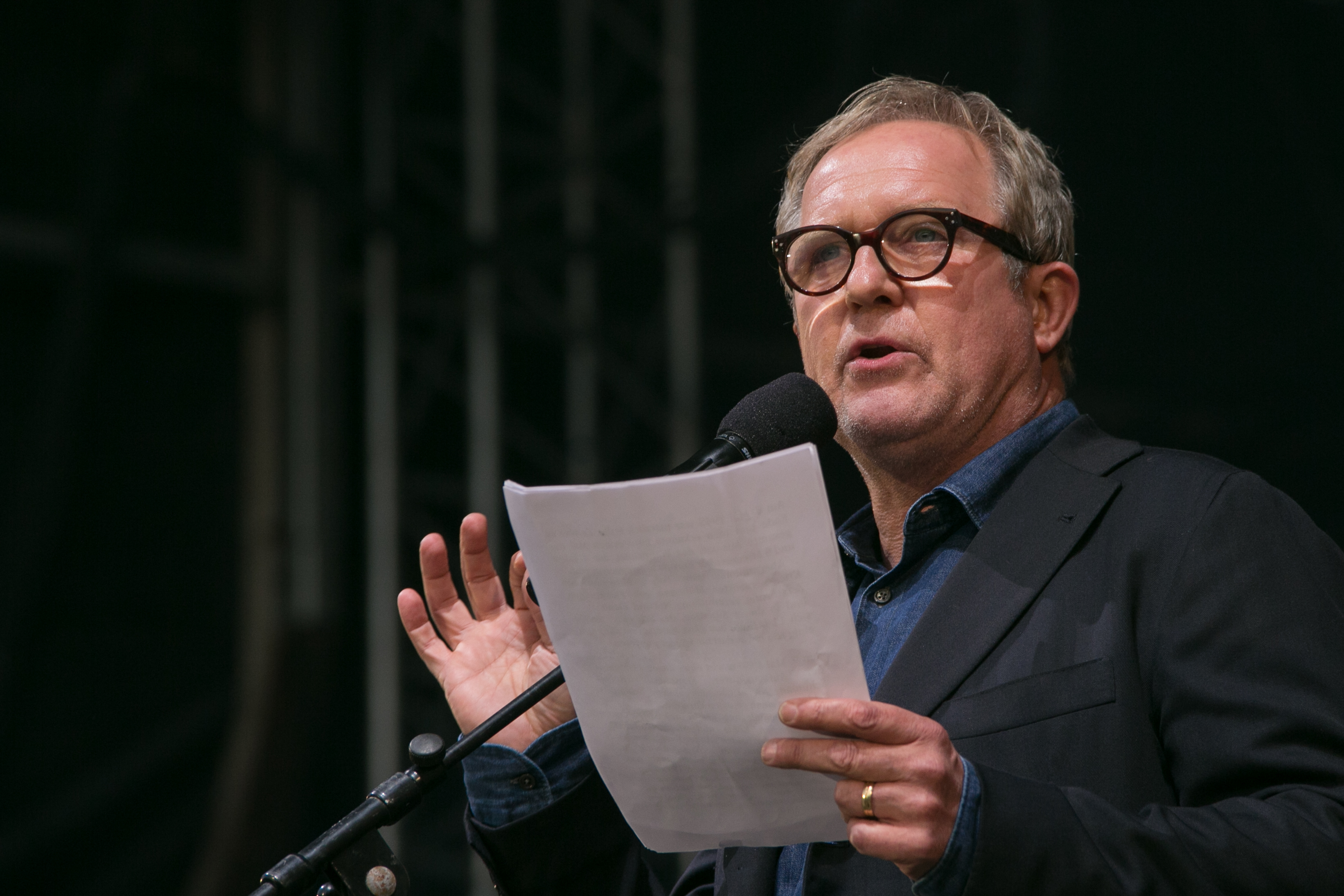
- Harald Krassnitzer at the Voices for Refugees concert in Vienna in 2015
- Born: 10 September 1960 (age 65); Grödig, Austria
- Occupation: Actor
- Spouse: Ann-Kathrin Kramer (m. 2009)
- Parent(s): Susanne Krassnitzer, Siegfried Krassnitzer

Harald Krassnitzer (born 10 September 1960, in Grödig, Austria) is an Austrian actor.

== Life ==
Krassnitzer grew up in Grödig, in the Flachgau district in Salzburg state, Austria. His father was a locksmith, while his mother worked in a candy factory. After graduating from the HTL in Eisenstadt, he was trained as a forwarding agent.

Krassnitzer was trained as an actor at the Elisabethbühne in Salzburg, where he was employed for four years upon the completion of his studies. After that, he played at the Schauspielhaus Graz in Graz, the Wiener Volkstheater in Vienna and the Saarland State Theatre in Saarbrücken.

Since 1995, Krassnitzer has acted mainly in television series (Der Bergdoktor, Der Winzerkönig, Tatort). He has been playing the role of the investigator Moritz Eisner in the Tatort series for the ORF since 1999, partly alone, and partly with changing colleagues. Since his 24th case, he has now working with Bibi Fellner, played by Adele Neuhauser.

He appeared as a co-moderator alongside Peter Rapp at the Licht ins Dunkel Gala in 1998. In the summer 1999, Krassnitzer presented the film series Wunderland as a personal love letter to Austria, in which he presented his favorite music and his favorite places.

Krassnitzer is committed to Hilfswerk Austria. He is co-owner of the company Blinklicht, a production company for mobile TV, which he founded in Vienna with two childhood friends.

Since 7 July 2009, he has been married to German actress Ann-Kathrin Kramer, with whom he previously was romantically involved for more than nine years. He currently lives in Wuppertal and has a second home in the Tirol region (Mieming).

Harald Krassnitzer is a social democrat and regularly supports the Social Democratic Party of Austria.

== Works ==
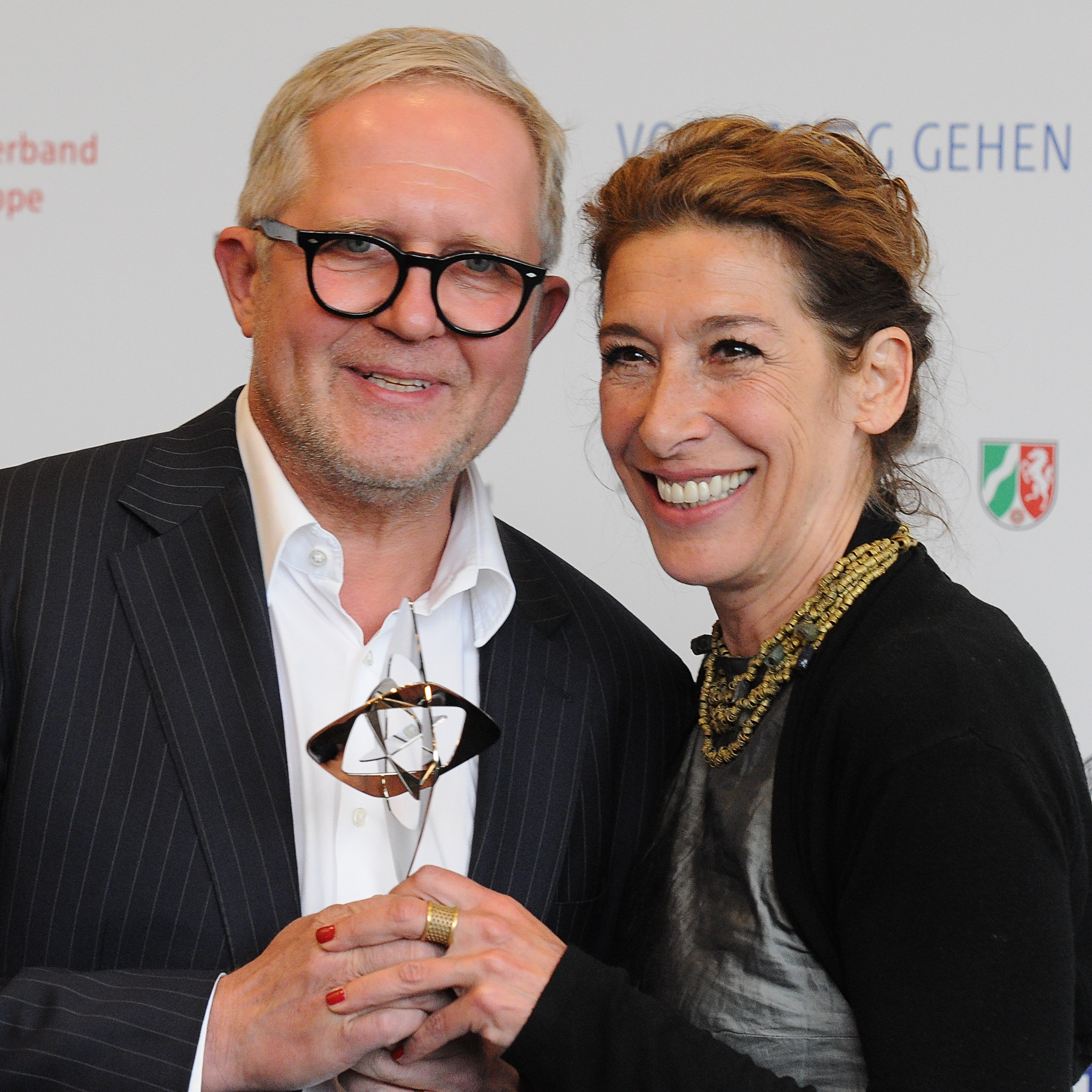
Harald Krassnitzer with Adele Neuhauser at Grimme-Preisverleihung 2014

=== Theatre ===
- Prince in Yvonne, Prinzessin von Burgund by Witold Gombrowicz, 1987
- Jojo in Das Gauklermärchen by Michael Ende, 1987, Elisabethbühne
- title role in Peer Gynt by Ibsen
- title role in König Johann by Friedrich Dürrenmatt
- Hamlet in Hamlet by Heiner Müller
- Oedipus in Oedipus Rex and Oedipus at Colonus by Sophokles
- Xerxes in Die Perser by Volker Braun after Aeschylus
- Karl Moor in Die Räuber by Schiller
- Faust in Faust I and Faust II by Goethe
- Primislaus in Libussa by Grillparzer
- Truffaldino in Diener zweier Herren by Carlo Goldoni
- Fernando in Stella by Goethe

=== Filmography (selection) ===
- 1996: Der Pakt – Wenn Kinder töten
- 1997: Stockinger – Spuren in den Tod
- 1997: Der Bergdoktor (TV series)
- 1998: Hurenmord – Ein Priester schweigt
- 1999: Rosamunde Pilcher – Der lange Weg zum Glück
- 1999/2000: Kanadische Träume – Eine Familie wandert aus (TV miniseries)
  - Episodes: 1. Der Aufbruch, 2. Das neue Leben, 3. Umwege der Liebe
- Since 1999: Tatort (TV series), as Moritz Eisner
- 2001: Hochzeit zu viert
- 2002: The Sisters' House
- 2003: Ausgeliefert
- 2003: Amundsen the Penguin
- 2003: MA 2412 – Die Staatsdiener
- 2003: Aus Liebe zu Tom
- 2003: Gefährliche Gefühle
- 2003: Das Traumschiff – Sambia und die Viktoriafälle
- 2004: Der Ferienarzt… auf Korfu
- 2004: Blood of the Templars
- 2004: Weißblaue Wintergeschichten
- 2004: Stauffenberg
- 2005: Im Reich der Reblaus
- 2005: Full Throttle
- 2005: Margarete Steiff
- 2005–2009: Der Winzerkönig (TV series)
- 2008: Live Wire
- 2008: Marie Brand und der Charme des Bösen
- 2009: Mein Mann, seine Geliebte und ich (TV film)
- 2009: Das Traumschiff – Papua Neuguinea
- 2010: Greed
- 2011: The Girl at the Bottom of the Sea
- 2011: Am Kreuzweg
- 2011: Aschenputtel
- 2012: Der Wettbewerb
- 2012: Never Trust Your Wife
- 2013: Paul Kemp – Alles kein Problem (TV series, 13 episodes)
- 2014: Elly Beinhorn: Solo Flight (TV film)
- 2014: The Lies You Sleep With (TV film)
- 2014: Fluss des Lebens – Wiedersehen an der Donau (TV film)
- 2014: Katie Fforde: Geschenkte Jahre (TV film)
- 2015: Meine fremde Frau
- 2016: Die Kunst des Krieges
- 2025: How to Be Normal and the Oddness of the Other World

== Awards ==
- 2000: Romy – Most popular series
- 2014: Grimme-Preis for Tatort: Angezählt
