= Hans Peter Ströer =

German musician and composer

Hans Peter Ströer (born 1956) in Munich is a German jazz musician and composer.

== Life and career ==
At the age of seven, Ströer was already composing his own rock 'n' roll pieces on the guitar, and at eleven he founded his first band. Ströer studied music theory and piano at the Richard Strauss Conservatory in the 1960s and then at the Hochschule für Musik in Munich.

At 17, he worked as a theatre musician. In the early 1970s, he became bass player in the Bobby Jones Trio, but he achieved greater fame from 1975 onwards as bassist in the Mild Maniac Orchestra of Volker Kriegel, to which he belonged until the mid-1980s, also to be heard on Biton Grooves. At the same time, he became a sought-after studio musician and participated in recordings by Eberhard Schoener, Falco, Donna Summer, Amanda Lear, La Bionda and Gilbert Bécaud.

Since 1984, Ströer has composed music for over 150 films, including films by Heinrich Breloer such as Death Game, Die Manns - Ein Jahrhundertroman, Speer und Er and Buddenbrooks. In addition, he was active as a music producer (including for Udo Lindenberg's albums between 1986 and 1998, which received several Goldene Schallplatten).

The percussionist Ernst Ströer is his younger brother, with whom he played in the group Ströer Brothers and contributed to the official German cultural contribution Kunstdisco Seoul to the Olympic Arts Festival at the 1988 Summer Olympics in Seoul.

== Filmography (selection) ==
- 1987: Reichshauptstadt – privat
- 1987: Eine geschlossene Gesellschaft
- 1993: Wehner – die unerzählte Geschichte
- 1997: Death Game
- 1999: Einfach raus
- 2001: Die Manns – Ein Jahrhundertroman
- 2005: The Night of the Great Flood
- 2005: Speer und Er
- 2008: Buddenbrooks
- 2013: Afghanistan: A Murderous Decision
- 2014: A Blind Hero: The Love of Otto Weidt
- 2014: Meine Tochter Anne Frank
- 2016: Letzte Ausfahrt Gera – Acht Stunden mit Beate Zschäpe
- 2016: Tatort: Borowski und das verlorene Mädchen
- 2019: Brecht
