= Jessica Schwarz =

German actress (born 1977)

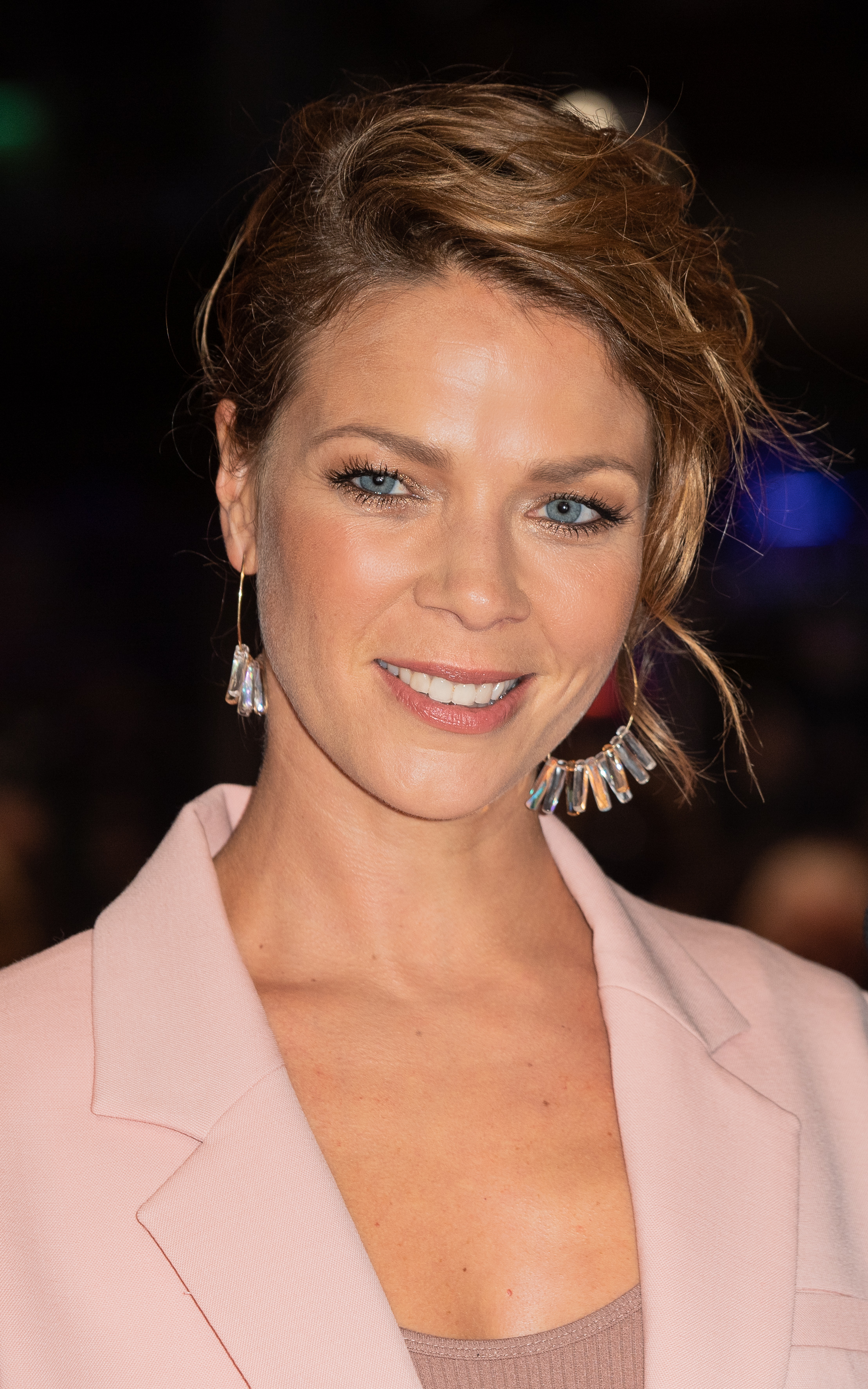
- Schwarz in 2020
- Born: 5 May 1977 (age 48); Erbach im Odenwald, West Germany
- Occupation: Actress
- Years active: 1997–present
- Spouse: Louis-Freytag Beckmann (m. 2021)
- Partners: Daniel Brühl (2001–2006); Markus Selikovsky (2010–2019)

Jessica Schwarz (born 5 May 1977) is a German actress.

== Life and career ==
Schwarz was born in Erbach im Odenwald and grew up in the small town of Michelstadt, Germany. She won a contest of the German teen magazine Bravo in 1993. Subsequently, she worked as a model and VJ for the music channel VIVA. In 2000 she started her acting career, but still occasionally hosts events, e.g. the German Film Award 2004. Schwarz separated from actor Daniel Brühl after a five-year relationship in 2006. She currently resides in Berlin.

Schwarz is probably best known outside Germany for her part in Perfume: The Story of a Murderer and as Tony Buddenbrook in the 2008 film adaptation of Thomas Mann's novel Buddenbrooks.

== Awards ==
- 2002 New Faces Award (Best Actress) for No Regrets
- 2003 Adolf Grimme Award (Fiction/Entertainment) for the performance in The Friends of the Friends
- 2004 Bavarian Film Awards (Best Actress), for her performance in Kammerflimmern
- 2009 Bambi Award for her performance in Romy

== Filmography (selected) ==
- 2001: No Regrets (Nichts bereuen)
- 2002: Friends of Friends (Die Freunde der Freunde, TV film)
- 2003: Play It Loud! (Verschwende deine Jugend)
- 2004: Cold Spring (Kalter Frühling, TV film)
- 2004: Off Beat (Kammerflimmern)
- 2004: Quito (TV film)
- 2006: Wild Chicks
- 2006: The Red Cockatoo (Der rote Kakadu)
- 2006: Lulu (TV film)
- 2006: Perfume: The Story of a Murderer
- 2006: Nothing but Ghosts
- 2006: Impossibly Yours (Der Liebeswunsch)
- 2007: Wild Chicks in Love
- 2007: Why Men Don't Listen and Women Can't Read Maps
- 2008: Buddenbrooks
- 2009: The Wild Chicks and Life
- 2009: The Door
- 2009: Romy (TV film, depicting Romy Schneider)
- 2010: Lautlose Morde (TV film)
- 2010: Der Mann der über Autos sprang
- 2010: The Day I Was Not Born
- 2011: Death of a Superhero
- 2011: When Santa Fell to Earth
- 2012: Heiter bis Wolkig
- 2012: Baron on the Cannonball
- 2012: Jesus Loves Me
- 2013: Adieu Paris
- 2014: Der Koch
- 2016: Zweimal zweites Leben
- 2016: Freddy/Eddy
- 2020: Biohackers
- 2022: Over & Out
- 2025: Das Kanu des Manitu
