= The Buddenbrooks (TV series) =

- Genre: Drama
- Based on: Buddenbrooks by Thomas Mann
- Written by: Berndt Rhotert; Franz Peter Wirth
- Directed by: Franz Peter Wirth
- Starring: Carl Raddatz; Ruth Leuwerik; Martin Benrath; Katharina Brauren; Volkert Kraeft
- Composer: Eugen Thomass
- Country of origin: West Germany
- Original language: German
- No. of series: 1
- No. of episodes: 11

Production
- Cinematography: Gernot Roll
- Running time: 60 minutes
- Production company: Hessischer Rundfunk

Original release
- Network: ARD
- Release: 15 October – 23 December 1979

The Buddenbrooks (German: Die Buddenbrooks) is a television series based on Thomas Mann's 1901 novel Buddenbrooks. It originally aired on ARD in 1979.

== Selected cast ==
- Carl Raddatz as Johann Buddenbrook sen.
- Katharina Brauren as Antoinette Buddenbrook
- Martin Benrath as Consul Johann (Jean) Buddenbrook jr.
- Ruth Leuwerik as Johann Buddenbrook jr.'s wife
- Volkert Kraeft as Thomas Buddenbrook
- Gerd Böckmann as Christian Buddenbrook
- Reinhild Solf as Antonie (Tony) Buddenbrook
- Michael Degen as Bendix Grünlich
- Noëlle Châtelet as Gerda Buddenbrook
- Adem Rimpapa as Hanno Buddenbrook
- Ursula Dirichs as Ida Jungmann
- Udo Thomer as Marcus, Procurator
- Alexander Hegarth as Dr. Grabow
- Regine Lutz as Sesemi Weichbrodt
- Elisabeth Endriss as Mlle. Popinet
- Hans Caninenberg as narrator
