= Hans Hollmann (director) =

Austrian-Swiss theatre director and actor (1933–2022)

- Born: 4 February 1933; Graz, Styria, Austria
- Died: 26 June 2022 (aged 89)
- Occupation: Theatre director
- Spouse: Reinhild Solf
- Children: Anna Joséphine; Caspar Florian (d 2001)
- Parent: Prof. Hans Hollmann

Hans Hollmann (4 February 1933 – 26 June 2022) was an Austrian-Swiss theatre director and actor. He also worked as a university lecturer and had a doctorate in jurisprudence. Despite having been born in Austria, for many years Hollmann lived with his family in Basel.

== Career ==
Hollmann's father, also called Hans Hollmann, was well known in and around Graz as a music teacher. His mother was also a teacher. Hollmann attended the Gymnasium (school) in Graz and then progressed to the local university, emerging in 1956 with a doctorate in jurisprudence. He then switched to drama, as he studied at the Reinhardt Seminar at the University of Music and Performing Arts in Vienna. In 1958 he received a diploma in acting.

He then made a start professionally, both as an actor and as a director, at Vienna's Josefstadt Theatre. His breakthrough as a director came in the 1964/65 season with a production of Shakespeare's Romeo and Juliet at the Heidelberg Theatre. In 1967 he achieved wider recognition internationally with a production of Ödön von Horváth's Italian Night at the Stuttgart State Theatre: the production later moved on to Berlin's Kurfürstendamm Theatre.

In December 1974 he directed the first comprehensive production of The Last Days of Mankind by Karl Kraus, over two evenings in the foyer of the Basel Theatre, which raised him to the status of one of the top theatre directors in German speaking central Europe. The next years he was appointed to the directorship of the theatre, a position he held for three years till 1978.

Hollmann later reprised his The Last Days of Mankind for the 1980 Vienna Festival, with a cast that included Helmuth Lohner, Peter Weck, Paulus Manker, Alexander Goebel and Götz Kauffmann, and returned to the piece on various occasions. Over a period of several decades he directed in all the major theatres of Germany, Austria and Switzerland. A particular focus was in respect of contemporary theatre, including first productions of plays by Bertolt Brecht, Elias Canetti, Tankred Dorst, Rainald Goetz, Peter Handke, Elfriede Jelinek, Heiner Müller and Botho Strauss. He also manifested an enduring interest in music theatre.

In 1993 Hollmann accepted a professorship in Theatre Direction at the University of Music and Performing Arts in Frankfurt am Main, heading up the Faculty of Performing Arts as dean between 1998 and 2003. While at Frankfurt he conceived and created what in 2002 became today's "Hessian Theatre Academy" ("Hessische Theaterakademie"), an association-network of four drama universities/academies and fifteen theatres in and around Frankfurt. It introduced an entirely new approach to artistic training, and for many years Hollmann himself served as its president, until succeeded in that role by Heiner Goebbels in 2006. The Hamburg Theatre Academy founded in 1994 followed the same model.

Along with numerous adaptations, translations and screenplays, Hollmann wrote essays and other contributions on theatre. He also gave public readings, focusing in particular on the writings of Elias Canetti, Karl Kraus und Heinrich Heine.

== Personal life ==
Hollmann was married to the actress Reinhild Solf until his death. The marriage produced two recorded children. Their son, Caspar Florian, was killed in an avalanche accident in 2001.

== Appreciation ==
From 1967 Hollmann productions were invited to be at the Berlin Theatre Festival. He was a member of the German Academy of Presentational Arts and an honorary member of the Berlin National Theatre company.

He was a holder of the Austrian Decoration for Science and Art (First class) and of the Styrian Cross of Honour (Gold). He was also a recipient of the Josef Kainz Medal from the city of Vienna and, in 2006, of the highest honour from the State of Hessen, the Goethe Award.
