= Paula Banholzer =

Paula Banholzer (6 August 1901 – 25 February 1989) was an educator and first love of Bertolt Brecht, who was born in Markt Wald and died in Augsburg.

== Life ==
The daughter of the physician Carl Banholzer, she was born and grew up in the Middle-Swabian Markt Wald in the present-day district of Unterallgäu. Later, she attended a higher girls' school, the Augsburger Maria-Theresia-Schule (now Maria-Theresia-Gymnasium). Banholzer and Brecht met in Augsburg in the spring of 1917. Brecht also called Paula "Bi" or called her by the English word "Bittersweet". He took this nickname from the drama Der Tausch by Paul Claudel.

Banholzer became pregnant by Brecht at the end of 1918. Brecht therefore sought her father to get his consent to a marriage, but Carl Banholzer declined this and sent his pregnant daughter from the district, to Kimratshofen in what is now the district of Oberallgäu. There, her son Frank was born in July 1919, named after Brecht's then role-model Frank Wedekind; he died on November 13, 1943, as a corporal in Porkhov (Porchow) on the Eastern Front. After the birth, Banholzer resumed her love affair with Brecht, who now lived in Munich. Another pregnancy ended in November 1921, possibly through an abortion. Brecht continued the relationship, but at the same time had a relationship with Marianne Zoff and medical student Hedda Kuhn.

In July 1921 Banholzer took a first distancing step, when she accepted a position as an educator in Nuremberg. When Brecht, now married to Marianne Zoff, learned in February 1924 of Banholzer's marriage intentions with her future husband, the Augsburg merchant Hermann Gross, he sent Helene Weigel to Augsburg to fetch "Bi" to Berlin. Paula Banholzer did not come.

In 1981 she wrote her memoirs, which were published as a book. 29 letters from Brecht to Banholzer were found in the estate of his brother Walter Brecht. They appeared in 1992 in book form.

== Bibliography ==
- Paula Banholzer, Paula Banholzer, so viel wie eine Liebe: der unbekannte Brecht (Erinnerungen u. Gespräche), ed. by Axel Poldner and Willibald Eser (München: Universitas, 1981) ISBN 3-8004-0899-6 (repr. as Paula Banholzer, meine Zeit mit Bert Brecht (München: Goldmann, 1984), ISBN 3-442-06669-7.
- Bertolt Brecht, Liebste Bi: Briefe an Paula Banholzer, ed. by Helmut Gier and Jürgen Hillesheim (Frankfurt/Main: Suhrkamp, 1992), ISBN 3-518-40487-3.
- Jürgen Hillesheim, Paula Banholzer, in Augsburger Brecht-Lexikon. Personen – Institutionen – Schauplätze (Würzburg: Königshausen & Neumann, 2000), pp. 38–40.
- Jürgen Hillesheim, Bertolt Brecht – Erste Liebe und Krieg (Augsburg 2008).
