= Die Alpenklinik =

- Starring: Erol Sander
- Country of origin: Germany

Die Alpenklinik (The Alpine Clinic) is a German romantic drama television series aired since 2005. It follows the activities of the successful Berlin heart surgeon Dr. Daniel Guth in the Salzburg area.

== See also ==
- List of German television series
