= Anna Herrmann (actor) =

German actress (born 1987)

Anna Herrmann (born 6 November 1987) is a German actress.

== Life ==
Born in Berlin, she made her screen debuts as a child actor in the TV series Hinter Gittern – Der Frauenknast and the film As Far as My Feet Will Carry Me. From 2014 to 2018 she trained at the Hochschule für Musik und Theater „Felix Mendelssohn Bartholdy“ Leipzig. There her appearances included Viel Lärm um nichts, a German translation of William Shakespeare's Much Ado About Nothing. In 2015 and 2016 she was awarded the Grimme-Preis award. She has also appeared in TV adverts for companies including Media Markt. Herrmann was a contributing writer for the 2024 Feminist Theatre Then & Now: Celebrating 50 years.

== Selected filmography ==
=== TV series ===
- 1999–2002: Hinter Gittern – Der Frauenknast (25 episodes)
- 2010: Tatort: Mord in der ersten Liga
- 2013: SOKO Köln: Der Gartenpirat
- 2014: SOKO Leipzig – Mr. Green
- 2014: Weinberg (4 episodes)
- 2015: Homeland (2 episodes)
- 2016: Die Spezialisten – Im Namen der Opfer: Die Mädchen aus Ost-Berlin
- 2017: Notruf Hafenkante: Todesraser
- 2017: SOKO Leipzig: Aus der Deckung
- 2017: Polizeiruf 110: Dünnes Eis
- 2017: Bad Cop – kriminell gut – Kindsköpfe
- 2017: Siebenstein – Rudi und die goldene Kugel
- 2017: Schuld nach Ferdinand von Schirach – Anatomie
- 2018: Rosamunde Pilcher: Wo dein Herz wohnt
- 2018: SOKO Köln: Tod in der Milchstraße
- 2018: SOKO Köln: Fatale Begierdeod in der Milchstraße
- 2019: Der Usedom-Krimi: Geisterschiff
- 2019: In aller Freundschaft – Die jungen Ärzte: Rollenmuster
- 2019: SOKO Leipzig: Mein Kind
- 2019: Tatort: Der gute Weg
- 2019: Skylines (Netflix series, 6 episodes)
- 2019: Der Bergdoktor: Déjà-Vu
- 2020: Notruf Hafenkante: Pick-Up-Artist
- 2020: Der Staatsanwalt: Fangschuss
- 2020: Letzte Spur Berlin: Amöbenliebe
- 2020: WaPo Berlin: MS Bettina
- 2020: In aller Freundschaft: Hoffnung ist keine Strategie
- 2020: Bettys Diagnose: Hitzewelle
- 2021: SOKO Stuttgart: Vermisst
- 2021: SOKO Hamburg: Kiezliebe
- 2021: Tatort: Hetzjagd
- 2021: Morden im Norden: Absturz
- 2021: Nord Nord Mord: Sievers und der schwarze Engel
- 2021: Fritzie – Der Himmel muss warten (5 episodes)
- 2022: Die Toten vom Bodensee – Das zweite Gesicht

=== TV films ===
- 2018: For My Daughter
- 2019: Brecht
- 2021: Die Luft zum Atmen

=== Films ===
- 2001: As Far as My Feet Will Carry Me
- 2011: Trattoria
- 2015: Die Schweigeminute
- 2017: Millennials
- 2017: A Terribly Rich Couple
- 2026: Eat Pray Bark

=== Short films ===
- 2008: Der Streit der Waisenmädchen
- 2009: Luzi
- 2010: Das Parfüm
- 2010: Die Nacht davor
- 2012: Kindergeburtstag
- 2012: Versammelt
- 2012: Stille Tage
- 2013: Leb Wohl, Adieu, Gute Nacht

=== Diploma films ===
- 2013: Neverland Now
- 2014: Millenilas
- 2014: Arielle
