= Mark Waschke =

German actor (born 1972)

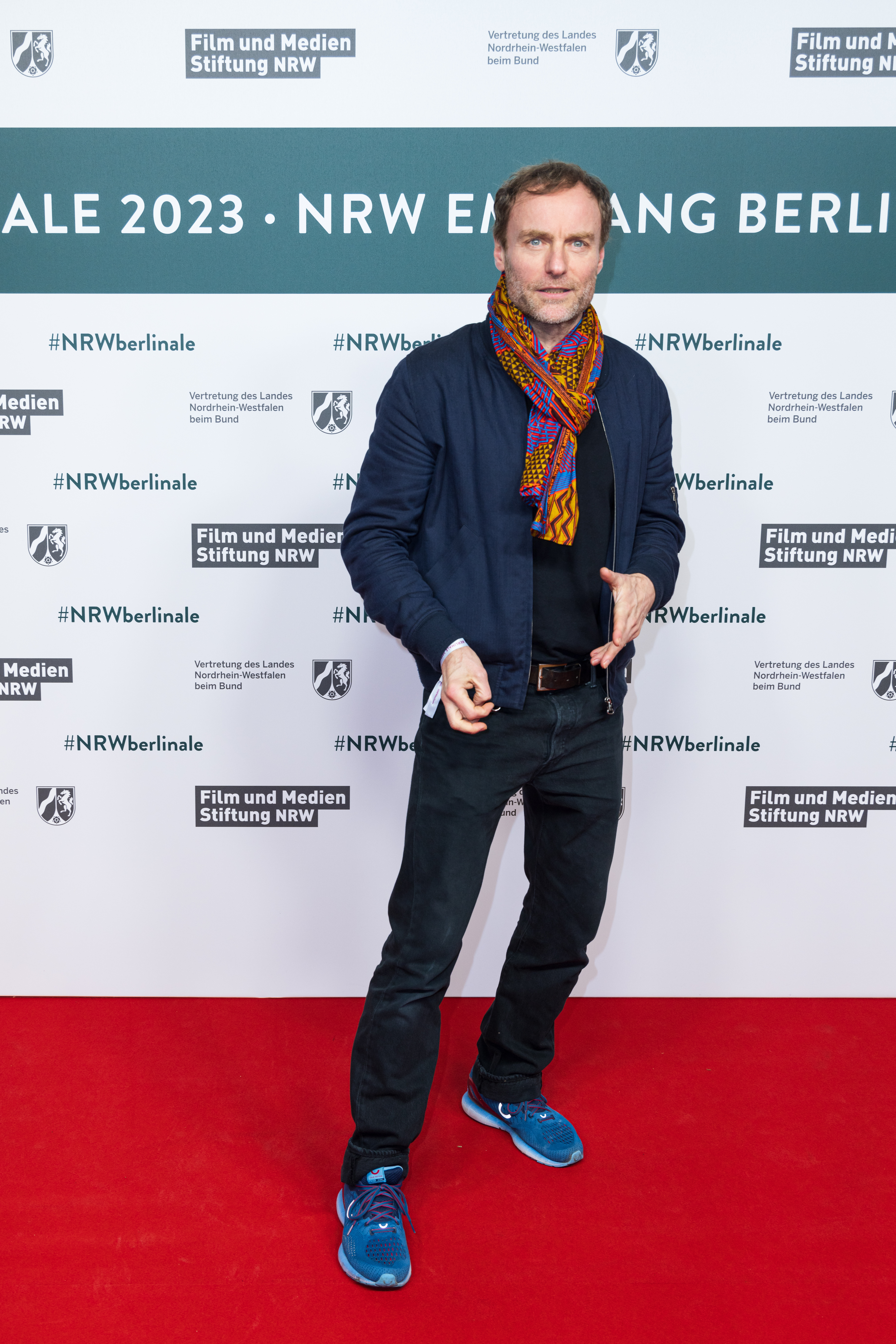
- Waschke in 2023
- Born: 10 March 1972 (age 54); Bochum, West Germany
- Occupation: Actor
- Years active: 1999–present
- Known for: Buddenbrooks; Habermann; Tatort; Dark

Mark Waschke (born 10 March 1972) is a German theatre, film and television actor who has been performing since 2005.

== Early life and education ==
Waschke was born the second of three sons in Wattenscheid, a district of the German city of Bochum. His father was a surgeon and his mother a nurse. In 1980, Waschke's father was hired as head of surgery at a hospital in Sulzbach, Saarland, and the family moved to Friedrichsthal. Waschke joined the local children's theater and later an amateur theater group.

In 1991, Waschke moved to Berlin. After completing his mandatory civil service, he began to study philosophy, which he later quit in order to focus on acting. From 1995 until 1999, he studied acting at the Ernst Busch Academy of Dramatic Arts.

== Career ==
From 1999 until 2008, Waschke was a regular staff member of the Berlin Schaubühne theatre company under Thomas Ostermeier, who has described him as "a good-looking, virile actor who takes full responsibility for his play and display of emotional diversity".

At Schaubühne, Waschke played lead roles in plays such as William Shakespeare's Macbeth and Tennessee Williams' Cat on a Hot Tin Roof.

In 2006, he performed at the Deutsches Theater Berlin in Kasimir und Karoline by Ödön von Horváth (directed by Andreas Dresen), and in 2009 at the Maxim Gorki Theater, Berlin, in Leonce and Lena by Georg Büchner, directed by Jan Bosse.

Since 2005, Waschke has appeared in television series and films, notably Buddenbrooks (2008), Habermann (2010), The City Below (2011), and Generation War (2013).

Since 2009, he has made regular appearances in the long-running crime drama series Tatort, and in 2015, he gained a permanent role, playing detective Robert Karow.

Waschke rejoined the Schaubühne theater for their 2013/14 season. He has said that acting on stage is a mental and physical need, not only because it does not get interrupted as in filming but also "for a different kind of responsibility, for oneself, the role, the play, the great ritual, which at best doesn't only do something for the audience [...]. In a rare moment it becomes utopia."

The actor became known to international audiences for his role as Noah in the Netflix-produced series Dark.

== Personal life ==
Waschke lives in Berlin with his wife, daughter, and son. In February 2021, he publicly came out, together with 184 other German LGBTQ+ actors. The move was part of a call for greater inclusion and diversity within the industry.

== Awards ==
- Nominated for Der Faust award – Best Acting Performance for Cat on a Hot Tin Roof (2007)
- Roma Fiction Fest – Best Actor in a Leading Role (2009)
- Bavarian Film Awards – Best Actor for Habermann (2009)
- Franz-Hofer Prize (2012)
- German Actors Award (2013)

== Selected filmography ==
=== Film ===
List of film appearances, with year, title, and role shown
Year	Title	Role	Notes
2008	Buddenbrooks	Thomas Buddenbrook	
2010	The City Below	Oliver Steve	
2010	Habermann	August Habermann	
2012	Barbara	Jörg	
2013	&ME	Eduard Schiller	

=== Television ===
List of television appearances, with year, title, and role shown
Year	Title	Role	Notes
2009	Die Rosenheim-Cops		1 episode
2009/2010	Tatort	Dr. Ralph Winkler/Bernd Bürger	2 episodes
2010	Kommissarin Lucas	Jan Geissler	1 episode
2010	Stolberg		
2012/2013	Tatort	Johannes Riether/Max Brenner	2 episodes
2013	Generation War	Dorn	
2015–present	Tatort	Robert Karow	11 episodes
2017–20	Dark	Hanno Tauber/Noah	
2021	The Billion Dollar Code	Carsten Schlüter	4 episodes
