= Volkert Kraeft =

German actor (born 1941)

- Born: 7 August 1941 (age 83); Timmendorfer Strand, Germany
- Website: www.agentur-eichhorn.de/schauspieler/kraeft/index.html

Volkert Kraeft (born 7 August 1941 in Timmendorfer Strand) is a German television actor.

== Selected filmography ==
- A Handful of Heroes (1967)
- Old Mamsell's Secret (1972, TV film)
- Derrick: Kalkutta (1976, TV series episode)
- Die Affäre Lerouge (1976, TV film)
- The Buddenbrooks (1979, TV series)
- Land, das meine Sprache spricht (1980, TV film)
- Vom Webstuhl zur Weltmacht (1983, TV series)
- Lorentz & Söhne (1988, TV series)
- With the Next Man Everything Will Be Different (1989)
- Karambolage (1989, TV film)
