= Claudia Wolscht =

German film editor

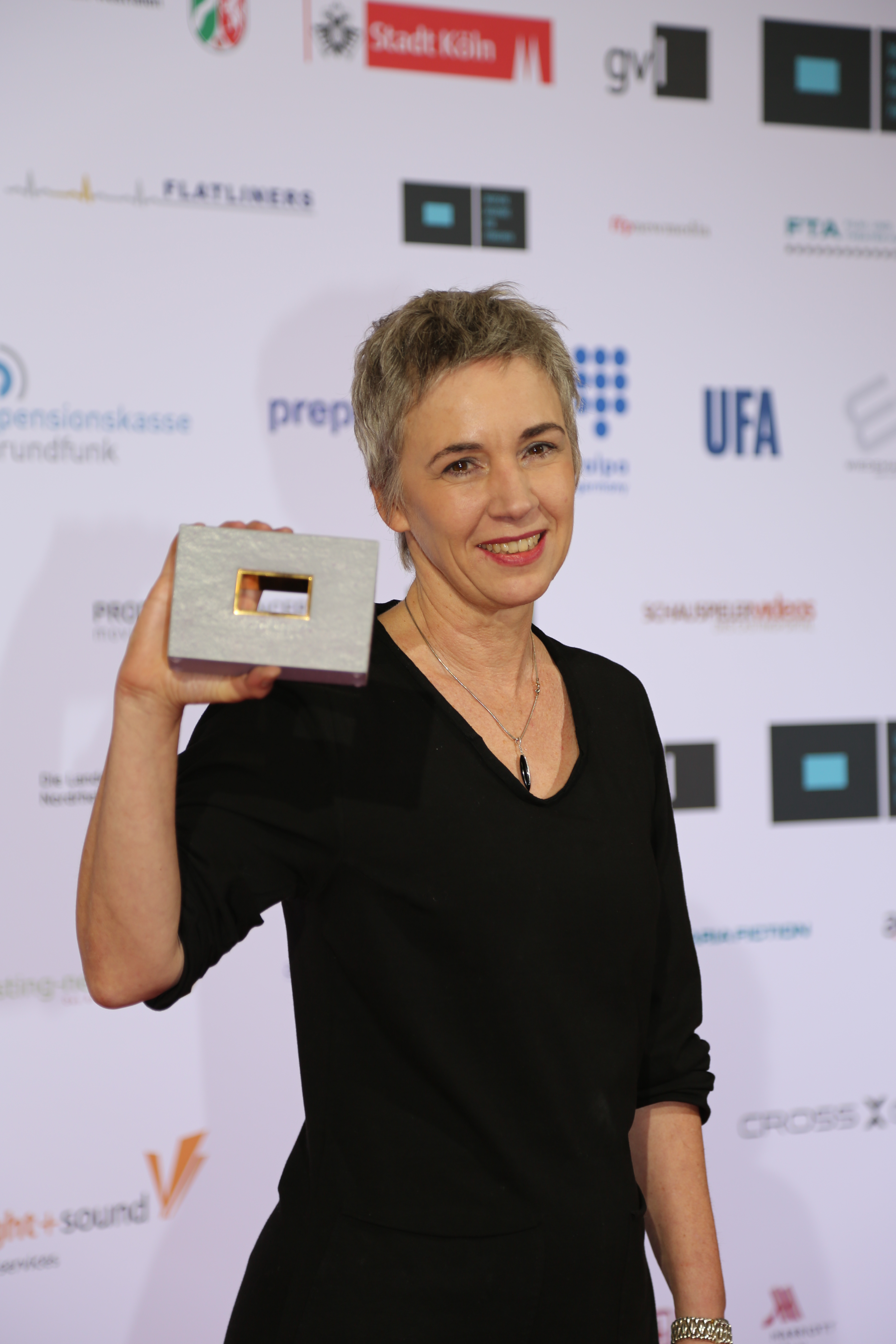
Claudia Wolscht at the Deutschen Akademie für Fernsehen awards in 2017

Claudia Wolscht (born 13 December 1960) is a German film editor.

== Life ==
Born in Bad Honnef, she studied social pedagogy and in 1986 assisted on the film Metropolis in Cologne. From 1988 to 1992 she gained experience as an assistant film editor and took a course in Avid-Media Composer. She has worked as a film editor for cinema and TV since 1993 on over 35 productions. She lives and works in Cologne.

== Awards ==
She won the 2010 German TV Prize (in the category "Best Multi-Part Work") her work on the series Im Angesicht des Verbrechens, which the following year also won her the Grimme-Preis (Fiction). She also won the 2017 German Television Prize and an award from the Deutsche Akademie für Fernsehen (in the Best Editing category) for Manhunt: Escape to the Carpathians (ARD/WDR). She also received a 2021 German Television Prize for her work on the historical drama Fabian: Going to the Dogs.

== Selected filmography ==
- 1999: Snow on New Year's Eve
- 2001: Tatort: Mördergrube (TV series)
- 2001: Tatort: Kindstod
- 2002: Tatort: Schützlinge
- 2003: Sex Up
- 2003: Bella Block: Tödliche Nähe
- 2003: Mensch Mutter
- 2003: Das siebte Foto
- 2004: Drechslers zweite Chance
- 2006: Wilsberg: Tod auf Rezept (TV series)
- 2007: Wilsberg: Miss-Wahl
- 2007: Ich leih’ mir eine Familie
- 2007: The Vow
- 2008: The Secret of Loch Ness
- 2010: Im Angesicht des Verbrechens (TV series, 10 episodes)
- 2011: Fernes Land
- 2011: The Invisible Girl
- 2012: Rat mal, wer zur Hochzeit kommt
- 2014: Not for Cowards
- 2014: Wealthy Corpses: A Crime Story from Starnberg
- 2015: Tatort: Hydra
- 2016: Am Abend aller Tage
- 2016: Manhunt: Escape to the Carpathians
- 2016: Wolfsland: Tief im Wald
- 2016: Hotel Heidelberg: Kramer gegen Kramer
- 2016: Hotel Heidelberg: Kommen und Gehen
- 2016: Hotel Heidelberg: Tag für Tag
- 2018: Crossroads
- 2019: Marie Brand und der Reiz der Gewalt
- 2019: Brecht
- 2021: Fabian: Going to the Dogs
- 2021: Polizeiruf 110: Bis Mitternacht
- 2022: Tatort: Gier und Angst
