= Buddenbrooks (film) =

- Theatrical release poster
- Directed by: Heinrich Breloer
- Screenplay by: Heinrich Breloer; Horst Königstein
- Based on: Buddenbrooks by Thomas Mann
- Produced by: Michael Hild; Jan S. Kaiser; Uschi Reich; Winka Wulff
- Starring: Jessica Schwarz; Mark Waschke; August Diehl; Armin Mueller-Stahl; Iris Berben
- Cinematography: Gernot Roll
- Edited by: Barbara von Weitershausen
- Music by: Hans Peter Ströer
- Production company: Bavaria Film
- Distributed by: Warner Bros. Pictures
- Release date: 25 December 2008
- Running time: 150 minutes
- Country: Germany
- Languages: German; Low German; Bavarian

Buddenbrooks, released also as Buddenbrooks: The Decline of a Family, is a 2008 German drama film directed by Heinrich Breloer, adapted from the 1901 novel of the same name by Thomas Mann. Set in the 19th century, the film portrays the decline of a wealthy family of grain merchants in Lübeck, the Buddenbrooks, and with them a whole way of life as Germany changed radically. It stars Armin Mueller-Stahl as the family's patriarch Consul Jean Buddenbrook, Iris Berben as his wife Bethsy Buddenbrook, and Jessica Schwarz, Mark Waschke and August Diehl as their children Tony, Thomas, and Christian Buddenbrook, respectively.

Buddenbrooks was released in Germany on 25 December 2008, and by July 2009 it was seen by more than 1.2million viewers. The film had its American premiere at the Seattle International Film Festival in June 2009. In 2010, it was released as a two–episode television miniseries, which was shown on the Arte on 23 and 24 December, and on the Das Erste on 27 and 28 December.

== Plot ==
The film tells the story of the Buddenbrook family over three generations — Jean Buddenbrook and his wife Bethsy; their sons Thomas and Christian; their daughter Tony; and Thomas' son Hanno. Even though he dearly loves them, Jean Buddenbrook expects his children to subordinate their personal happiness to the welfare of the family firm. The first to learn this is Tony who, after a holiday romance with a medical student from a modest family, is married off to Bendix Grünlich, a prominent businessman in Hamburg who shortly after goes bankrupt: Jean brings her home.

Her brothers have meanwhile been learning their trade in Amsterdam and London. Crushed by Tony's marital disaster and several unlucky transactions, Jean Buddenbrook makes over the business to Thomas, the elder son. Thomas leaves his secret mistress, a florist's assistant, and although he does not love her marries Gerda, a Dutch heiress who is more interested in playing the violin and in consorting with aristocrats. After having spent time in Valparaiso, Christian returns to Lübeck but shows no interest in the firm, preferring to drink and haunt the theatre, especially the actress Aline. The patriarch Jean dies, and his widow Bethsy holds the family together.

The divorced Tony catches the eye of Alois Permaneder, a cheerful Bavarian hop merchant who marries her and takes her off to his home in Munich. His fondness for drink and for the maid leads her to return shortly to Lübeck. She suggests to Thomas that he could expand the business by buying grain before harvest from the estates of Prussian aristocrats. He buys a whole crop that is than destroyed by hail, losing all his outlay and denting his reputation.

Gerda at length gives birth to a son Hanno, who proves to be a gifted musician but has no interest in the family or the business. Thomas is elected a senator, like his father but, after the extraction of a troublesome tooth, collapses and dies. His will requires that the near-moribund firm be liquidated. Hanno dies in his teens and Gerda returns to the Netherlands. Tony and Christian, after selling the family home and contents, go their separate ways.

== Cast ==
- Jessica Schwarz as Antonie "Tony" Buddenbrook
- Mark Waschke as Thomas Buddenbrook
- August Diehl as Christian Buddenbrook
- Armin Mueller-Stahl as Consul Johann "Jean" Buddenbrook
- Iris Berben as Elisabeth "Bethsy" Buddenbrook
- Léa Bosco as Gerda Buddenbrook
- Alexander Fehling as Morten Schwarzkopf
- Justus von Dohnányi as Bendix Grünlich
- Martin Feifel as Alois Permaneder
- Nina Proll as Aline Puvogel
- Raban Bieling as Hanno Buddenbrook
- Sylvester Groth as Kesselmeyer
- Fedja van Huêt as Hermann Hagenström
- Ariella Hirshfeld as Julchen Möllendorpf
- Sunnyi Melles as Mrs. Möllendorpf
- Josef Ostendorf as Senator Möllendorpf
- Max von Pufendorf as René Maria von Trotha
- Maja Schöne as Anna Iwersen
- Tonio Arango as Stefan Kistenmaker
- Matthias Deutelmoser as Doctor Giesecke
- André Hennicke as Gosch
- Teresa Harder as Ida Jungmann
- Elert Bode as Consul Lebrecht Kröger
- Michael Abendroth as Doctor Grabow
- Jan-Hendrik Kiefer as Kai von Mölln
- Jürgen Rißmann as Diener Anton

== Awards and nominations ==
Award	Year	Category	Nominated	Result
Bavarian Film Awards	2008	Production and Costume Design	Götz Weidner; Barbara Baum	Won

== Home media ==
Buddenbrooks was released on DVD and Blu-ray on 11 September 2009.
