= Eat Pray Bark =

2026 German comedy film

Eat Pray Bark (Eat Pray Bark – Therapie auf vier Pfoten) is a German comedy feature film co-written and directed by Marco Petry and released in 2026. The main actors are Alexandra Maria Lara, Anna Herrmann, Devid Striesow, Doğa Gürer, Rúrik Gíslason, and Kerim Waller.

== Production and release ==
Filming took place in Tyrol, Austria, from August 21 to October 9, 2024. The film was produced by Olga Film, with Viola Jäger and Marina Schiller producing. Lemonpie Film handled production in Austria. The cinematography was by Marc Achenbach, the editing by Knut Hake, and the casting by Iris Baumüller. Production design was by Tommy Stark, costume design by Nici Zinell, sound design by Herbert Verdino, and makeup by Christina Baier and Dolores Sanchez. The animal trainer was Renate Hiltl. Marco Petry previously directed the comedy Spieleabend (Film) (2024) for Netflix. Bill Kaulitz makes a cameo appearance in the film. The film was released on Netflix on April 1, 2026.
