= Vier Frauen und ein Todesfall =

- Created by: Wolf Haas
- Starring: Adele Neuhauser; Brigitte Kren; Martina Poel; Julia Stinshof
- Country of origin: Austria
- No. of seasons: 9
- No. of episodes: 66

Original release
- Network: ORF 1
- Release: 17 February 2005 – 19 October 2020

Vier Frauen und ein Todesfall is an Austrian crime television series, first aired on the Austrian television channel "ORF eins" in 2005. The show also aired in Switzerland on SRF1, in Germany on RTL Crime and on the Franco-German TV network Arte dubbed in French.

The sending-rights were sold to Slovenia, Bosnia, Bulgaria, Ukraine, Russia and Denmark.

== Plot ==
The four so-called "funeral friends" live in a small Austrian village and visit every funeral there. They always have their own theories about how people died and start investigations themselves because of the incompetence of the village police. With that, they often make enemies among the village's other inhabitants.

== Critical reception ==
At the beginning the show seemed to be a flop, but the ratings are still very good (1.3 million). Apart from the setting in a very picturesque landscape the show offers a typical Austrian sense of humour and a sometimes unorthodox image of women.

== See also ==
- List of Austrian television series
