= Erol Sander =

Turkish-German actor (born 1968)

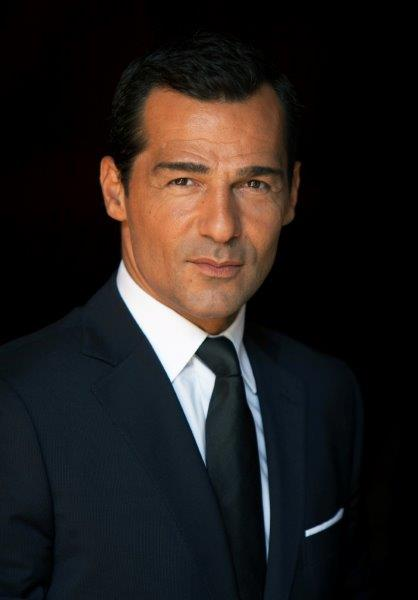
- Sander in 2014
- Born: Urcun Salihoglu; 9 November 1968 (age 56); Istanbul, Turkey
- Years active: 1996–present
- Website: erolsander.de (in German)

Erol Sander (born 9 November 1968 as Urçun Salihoğlu) is a Turkish-German actor.

== Filmography ==
- 1990: Two's a Crowd (TV series) - Jannicke Guigue
- 1997: Paradis d'enfer (TV series) - Philippe Roussel
- 2000: Zwei Leben nach dem Tod
- 2001: The Apocalypse (TV film) - Ionicus
- 2001-2002: Sinan Toprak ist der Unbestechliche (TV series) - Kriminalhauptkommissar Sinan Toprak
- 2003: Spurlos – ein Baby verschwindet (TV film) - Peter Wedekind
- 2003: Für immer verloren (TV film) - Erkan Öcelit
- 2003: Betty – Schön wie der Tod (TV film) - Thomas Lohner
- 2003: Soraya (TV film) - the Shah
- 2003: Mein Mann, mein Leben und du (TV film) - Frank Moss
- 2003: Rosamunde Pilcher: Federn im Wind (TV) - David Norris
- 2004: Tausendmal berührt (TV film) - Leon Willfahrt
- 2004: Alexander - Persian Prince
- 2004: Vernunft und Gefühl (TV film)
- 2004: Liebe ist (k)ein komisches Wort
- 2005: Wenn der Vater mit dem Sohne (TV film) - Paul Bachmann
- 2005: This Far from Paradise (TV film) - Andrew Stoughton
- 2005: Die Liebe eines Priesters (TV film) - Michael
- 2005: Wen die Liebe trifft (TV film) - Luca Berger
- 2005: Inga Lindström: Sprung ins Glück (TV) - Axel Hasselroth
- 2005: Andersrum (TV film) - Makler
- 2005: Die goldene Stadt
- 2005: Liebe hat Flügel
- 2006: Pompeii
- 2006: Im Himmel schreibt man Liebe anders (TV film) - Christoph Fischer
- 2006–2011: Die Alpenklinik (TV series, 6 episodes) - Dr. Daniel Guth
- 2007: Im Tal der wilden Rosen (TV series) - Jake Cross
- 2007: A Love in Cuba (TV film) - Jan Holzer
- 2007: Der Zauber des Regenbogens (TV film) - Brian O'Casey
- 2007: Die Rosenkönigin (TV film) - Bernhard Reichenberg
- 2008: Die Blüten der Sehnsucht (TV film) - Paul Pflüger
- 2008: Rebecca Ryman: Olivia and Jai (TV film) - Jai Raventhorne
- 2008–2018: Mordkommission Istanbul (TV series, 22 episodes) - Police Inspector Mehmet Özakin
- 2009: All the Longing in the World (TV film) - Jan Hansen
- 2009: Tatort: Familienaufstellung (TV) - Durmus Korkmaz
- 2016: Snowden - Diplomat Party Guest

== Personal life ==
In 2000 Sander married Frenchwoman Caroline Godet, a niece of director Oliver Stone.
