= Blackout (2010 film) =

2010 German film

- Film poster
- German: 380.000 Volt – Der große Stromausfall
- Directed by: Sebastian Vigg
- Starring: Ann-Kathrin Kramer; Tobias Oertel; Rolf Kanies; Michael Lott
- Music by: Kay Skerra
- Country of origin: Germany
- Original language: German

Production
- Cinematography: Peter Nix
- Editor: Daniela Beauvais
- Running time: 92 minutes

Original release
- Release: 30 November 2010

Blackout (German: 380.000 Volt – Der große Stromausfall) is a German film directed by Sebastian Vigg. It was released in 2010.
