= Puti Kaisar-Mihara =

Martial artist

- Born: April 28, 1986 (age 39); Padang, Indonesia
- Citizenship: Austria
- Known for: Die Kunst des Krieges (2016)
- Father: Mihar Walk Tan Pangeran

External media
- A Look at Puti Kaisar-Mihara

Images
- Aplikasi Self Defense dari Pendekar Minang Puti Kaisar Mihara
- 来週、私はバレッタにいます - マルタ
- Frohes Chinesisches Neujahr!
- Manis (Dir auch einen wundervollen Tag)

Video
- Puti Kaisar-Mihara in the film "The Art of War"

Puti Kaisar-Mihara (born April 28, 1986) is an Austrian martial artist and model of Indonesian origin. Her father Mihar Walk Tan Pangeran (b. 1961) is Minangkabau. Puti Mihara was born in Padang, but moved at the age of three with her father from Indonesia to Vienna, where she grew up. A silat student since the age of 3-4, Mihara holds the honorary title of Pendekar and works as the coach at the Pandeka Mihar Institute in Vienna. She raised to prominence with her leading role in Tatort: Die Kunst des Krieges (2016). Also, she plays a role in the Austrian television series "Vorstadtweiber."
