= Ann-Kathrin Kramer =

German actress and writer (born 1966)

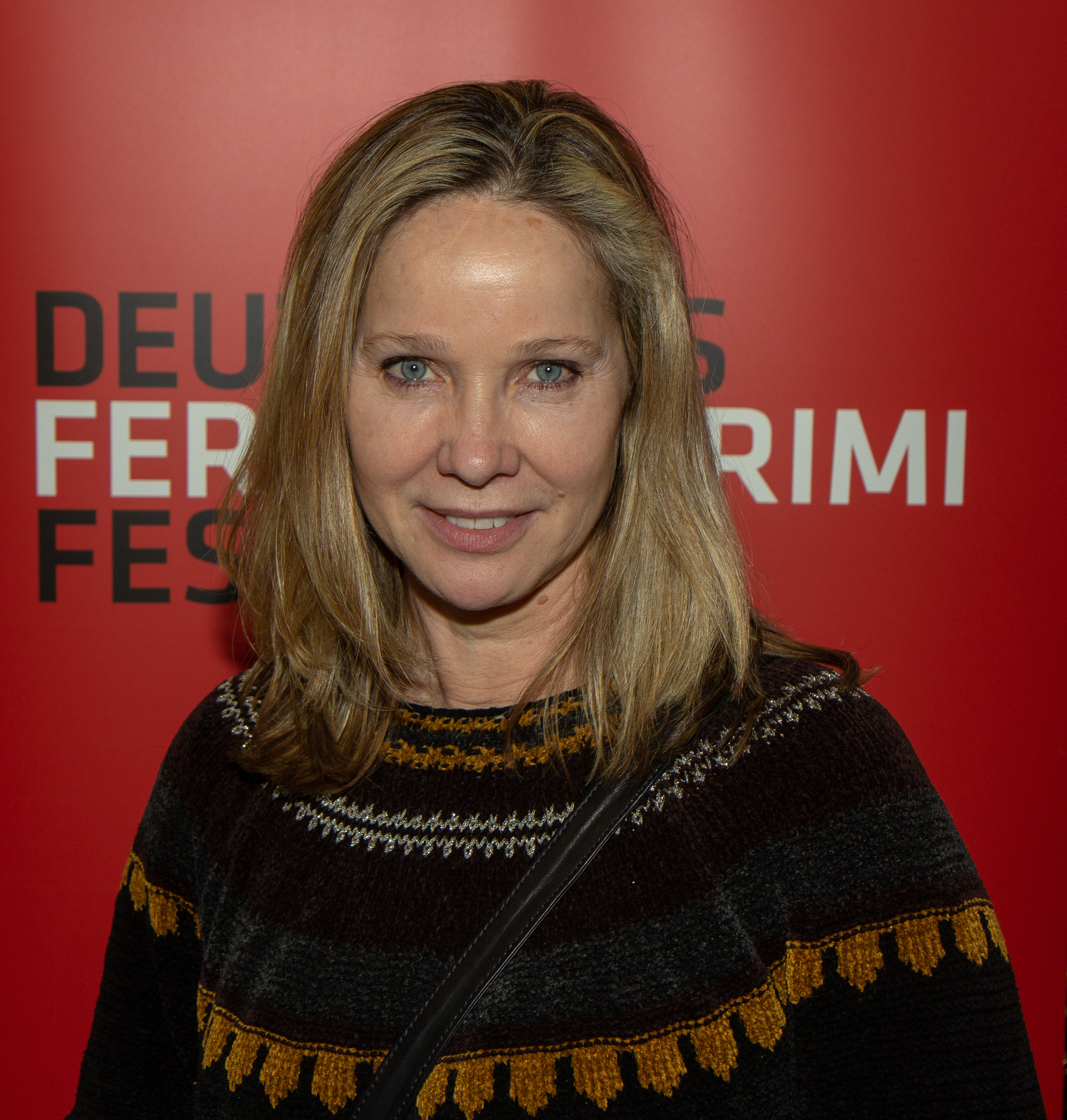
- Kramer in 2019
- Born: 4 April 1966 (age 59); Wuppertal, West Germany
- Occupations: Actress; writer
- Spouse: Harald Krassnitzer (m. 2009)

Ann-Kathrin Kramer (born 4 April 1966) is a German actress and writer.

== Biography ==
Kramer was born and educated in Wuppertal but left school at the age of sixteen. She worked as a shop window designer, made portraits of tourists in Greece, and applied to fashion school without success. She eventually took the "Technische Abitur" (baccalaureate-level qualification), but decided against studying physics as she had initially planned. At 26, she went to the Gmelin Drama School in Munich and completed her training as an actress.

Kramer took singing lessons with Anneliese Hofmann de Boer and acting lessons with John Costopoulos in the Lee Strasberg Method.

She has two brothers and a son who was born in 1997 from her relationship with Jan Josef Liefers. She married Harald Krassnitzer in 2009.

Kramer works with the charity "Dunkelziffer - Hilfe für sexuell missbrauchte Kinder" (Unreported - Help for Sexually Abused Children) in Hamburg and represents the "Bundesstiftung Kinderhospiz" (Federal Children's Hospice Foundation).

In 2005, she published the children's book Matilda - Oder die aus dem Haus ohne Fenster (Matilda - Or the House Without Windows), with a sequel, Neues von Matilda, dem Mädchen aus dem Haus ohne Fenster (News From Matilda, the Girl From the House Without Windows), in 2014.

In 2008, Stefan Loeffler wrote a biography of Kramer titled Ann-Kathrin Kramer – Begegnungen (Ann-Kathrin Kramer – Encounters).

== Selected filmography ==
=== Film ===
List of film appearances, with year, title, and role shown
Year	Title	Role	Notes
1998	Das merkwürdige Verhalten geschlechtsreifer Großstädter zur Paarungszeit	Manuela	
1998	Abgehauen	Erika Salow	
2010	Blackout	Anja Radtke	

=== Television ===
List of television appearances, with year, title, and role shown
Year	Title	Role	Notes
1993	SOKO München		1 episode
1994	Alles außer Mord		1 episode
1994	Hallo, Onkel Doc!	Nurse Anna	12 episodes
1995	Zwei Brüder		
2000, 2006	Der letzte Zeuge		2 episodes
2002–2006	Das Duo	Lizzy Krüger	11 episodes
2006	Ein Fall für zwei		1 episode
2007	Tatort	Frederike Kawentz	1 episode
2009	Polizeiruf 110	Ruth Brehme	1 episode
2014	Das Traumschiff		
2014/2015	Ein starkes Team	Gisela Kubasch/Maike Berger	2 episodes
2014, 2019	The Old Fox		2 episodes
2016	Die Chefin		1 episode
2017	Der Bergdoktor		1 episode

== Bibliography ==
- Matilda – Oder die aus dem Haus ohne Fenster (2005)
- Neues von Matilda, dem Mädchen aus dem Haus ohne Fenster (2014)
