= Hanne Hiob =

German actress (1923–2009)

Hanne Hiob (12 March 1923 – 23 June 2009) was a German actress.

== Early life ==
Hiob was born on 12 March 1920 as Hanne Marianne Brecht in Munich, the daughter of the writer Bertolt Brecht and his then wife, the opera singer and actress Marianne Zoff. In February 1928, Zoff had a daughter, Ursula Lingen, by German actor Theo Lingen. In September 1928, Brecht and Zoff divorced; Zoff married Lingen later that year. Hanne Brecht later married Joachim Hiob.

Hanne grew up with her mother and Theo Lingen, and Lingen was able to protect his wife, who was classified as a half-Jew under the Nazi-regime, and his daughter from persecution.

== Career ==
Hanne Brecht studied dance at the Vienna State Opera. From 1941 she worked as a dancer and an actress in Salzburg, Austria. Among other parts, she played the leading role in Brecht's Señora Carrar's Rifles and in 1959 in Saint Joan of the Stockyards under the direction of Gustaf Gründgens. She performed in Munich, Hamburg, Frankfurt, Vienna and Berlin.

She retired from the stage in 1976 but remained active reading Brecht works and participating in street theater projects such as the Anachronistic Train.

Hiob got involved in pacifism, and received the Aachen Peace Prize in 2005.

In 1990, Hiob published a collection of letters Brecht had sent to her mother and herself.

== Death ==
Hanne Hiob died in Munich, on 23 June 2009, aged 86, from undisclosed causes.

== Filmography ==
=== Actress ===
- Hundert Jahre Brecht (A hundred years of Brecht) (1997)
- Die letzte Runde (The last round) (1983)
- Raindrops (1980/1981)
- The Investigation (1966, TV film)
- Es fing so harmlos an (It began so innocently) (1943/1944)
- Frau Luna (Mrs. Luna) (1941)

=== Director ===
- Flüchtlingsgespräche (2003)

== Literature ==
- Hanne Hiob, Gerd Koller (ed.) Wir verreisen...in die Vernichtung; Briefe 1937–1944, Aufbau Taschenbuch Verlag Berlin (1998), ISBN 3-7466-1395-7
- Brecht, Bertolt; Zoff, Marianne; Glaeser, Günter (1990). Hiob, Hanne (ed.). Briefe an Marianne Zoff und Hanne Hiob (1. Aufl ed.). Frankfurt am Main: Suhrkamp. ISBN 978-3-518-40222-1.
- Hillesheim, Jürgen (2000). Augsburger Brecht-Lexikon: Personen - Institutionen - Schauplätze. Würzburg: Königshausen und Neumann. ISBN 9783826012761.
