= Ursula Lingen =

German-Austrian actress

Ursula Lingen (9 February 1928 – 20 October 2014) was a German-Austrian actress.

== Life ==
Lingen was the daughter of actor Theo Lingen and actress Marianne Zoff, the first wife of Bertolt Brecht. Zoff's daughter, actress Hanne Hiob, was Ursula Lingen's half-sister. She was married to the actor and film director Kurt Meisel.

== Filmography ==
Year	Title	Role	Notes
1944	Es fing so harmlos an	Young Woman	Uncredited
1948	Hin und her	Prinzessin Marina von Lappalien / Lilly Dore	
1949	Die seltsame Geschichte des Brandner Kaspar	Mena	
1949	Weißes Gold	Maggie, Konstruktionszeichnerin	
1951	Johannes und die 13 Schönheitsköniginnen	Ramona, Miss Spanien	
1951	Dance Into Happiness	Inez Cavalcante	
1956	Regine	Rita Carsten	
1956	The Model Husband	Alma Sedlmayr	
1966	Die rote Rosa	Rosa Luxemburg	TV film
1979-1995	Derrick	Agnes Ortner / Helene v. Schulze-Westorp / Frau Holzinger / Hannelore Schenk / Dora Kolberg / Lena	6 episodes
