= Otto Zoff =

Austrian journalist and writer

- Born: Otto Friedländer-Zoff; 9 April 1890; Prague, Austria-Hungary
- Died: 14 December 1963 (aged 73); Munich, West Germany
- Occupation(s): Novelist; Dramatist; Journalist; Dramaturge; Gambler
- Children: 2

Otto Zoff (9 April 1890 – 14 December 1963) was an Austrian author, script writer, dramaturge, journalist and "all-round Bohemian". For reasons of politics and race he spent much of his life abroad, including almost twenty years as an immigrant in the United States of America. During his lifetime he was noted, in particular, for his drama compositions and historical monographs, but fifty years after his death he had for most purposes fallen out of fashion.

== Life ==
Otto Friedländer-Zoff was born on 9 April 1890, in Prague, at that time a multi-cultural and intellectually dynamic city. His father, Otto Andreas Zoff, who had served time in prison before he married, is variously described as a senior railway inspector and a military official. When the boy was aged 2 the family relocated to Sankt Pölten, the first substantial town along the main railway line from Vienna travelling west. Shortly afterwards they moved again, this time to Hainfeld, a much smaller town to the southwest of Vienna. It was in Hainfeld that Otto Zoff's younger sister, Marianne Zoff (who later became the first wife of Bertolt Brecht) was born.

In 1909, he enrolled at the University of Vienna where he studied the History of Arts and Literature. His teachers included Max Dvořák. He emerged with a doctorate in 1914. By that time he had started to contribute poems and short stories to the literary journal Der Brenner. 1913 also saw the publication of his first novel, "Das Haus am Wege". Friends during his time at university included the novelists Felix Braun and Max Mell, as well as the art historian Leopold Zahn.

During the First World War Zoff moved to Berlin where he wrote for various newspapers and magazines, including the Berliner Tageblatt, the Berliner Börsen-Courier, Neue Rundschau, März and Wieland. Along with that, during 1916 and 1917, he was employed as an editor with the publisher S. Fischer Verlag. In 1917, he took a job as a dramaturge in Munich at the Munich Kammerspiele (theatre) where between 1919 and 1923 he was deputy theatre director. His literary career also continued to flourish, with the novel "Der Winterrock" ("The winter skirt") published in 1919. He also enjoyed great success during the early 1920s with stage adaptations of literary works, a notable example being a liberal reworking of von Eichendorff's "Die Freier" ("The suitors"), which was staged by almost a hundred theatres.

Such adaptations were a major focus of Zoff's work through the rest of the decade, during which he worked as a freelance writer and editor. Starting in 1926, he also began to contribute radio scripts to the broadcasters being set up in major cities such as Vienna, Breslau and Munich. What was, perhaps, his most important novel, "Die Liebenden" appeared in 1929, and stimulated a certain amount of controversy with its mixture of "new worldly" and "tearfully conventional" aspects.

After 1931, Zoff spent most of his time in Italy. However, it was in Berlin that in 1933—the same year Adolf Hitler took power—he met Liselotte Kalischer whom he married shortly afterwards; they were politically left-wing, and Zoff's mother was Jewish. At one point during the mid-1930s, Zoff's novels were publicly burned and placed on a list of banned books in Nazi Germany (which after 1938 would also include Austria). Otto and Liselotte settled in Milan, where Liselotte and her sister ran a "movement therapy" clinic. Their daughter Constance ("Stanzel" / "Stanzi") Zoff was born in 1938. Meanwhile, under circumstances that remain unclear, the ban against publishing Zoff's books had been lifted in Germany where his historical presentation "The Huguenots" appeared in 1937. During the late 1930s, Zoff ostentatiously turned his back on authorship, preferring to earn his living by playing roulette. He was joined in this enterprise by the (originally Viennese) archaeologist Guido Kaschnitz von Weinberg. Sources indicate that gambling produced a negative income, however, and the Zoffs were dependent on Liselotte's earnings during these years.

War was declared in September 1939 and France was invaded in May/June 1940. The three Zoffs relocated to Nice which had become part of France eighty years before. Other Jewish intellectuals, such as the Zoffs' friend Walter Benjamin, made similar moves to the French riviera. Like thousands of others following the German invasion from the north, they now became involved in a desperate struggle to obtain the visas and other documents necessary to exit France, traverse Spain, and then to emigrate to the United States of America. Liselotte Zoff's previous husband's was a man called Ludwig Köbner. Köbner's second wife lived in New York City, and he was able to help them obtain the necessary "Danger visa". In 1941, the Zoffs arrived in New York.

Zoff settled in an artists' colony in New Hampshire. Due to the scale of the enforced exodus from central Europe of Jewish (and other) intellectuals, Zoff had arrived in New York to find plenty of influential contacts, such as the publisher Kurt Wolff and his wife Helene and the writers Alfred Neumann and Hermann Kesten. Another familiar face belonged to Bertolt Brecht who remained a friend despite his marriage to Zoff's younger sister having ended more than ten years earlier. Although he had ready made social network in the literary world, Zoff barely set foot in it himself, having apparently lost the necessary spark of spontaneity. He saw his friends, but did not become attached to any particular social circle, preferring to remain a "loner": Liselotte thought that he might have feared being overshadowed. He spent long hours at his desk, and had grand ideas, but little came of it. After the war, and more particularly during the early 1950s, he undertook work as a correspondent for various West Germany newspapers, but sources suggest that it was still Liselotte, working as a therapist, who was the principal bread winner.

Directly following the war the Zoffs were in no hurry to return to Germany, but by 1950 they would have liked to be able to visit. Initially they were unable to obtain passports, having apparently fallen under suspicion for their leftwing views in the context of the McCarthyism of the times. However, US naturalization certificates dated 15 May 1953 were issued by the New York Southern District Court for Otto and Liselotte Zoff. At first they were still unable to visit Europe due to lack of cash. However, later in 1953 they were able to make the trip "because a rich friend gave us the money", as Liselotte wrote. In addition to work for German newspapers, at some point during the postwar years Otto Zoff worked as New York correspondent for the South West [German] broadcasting company. In the later 1950s he also experienced a moderate return to form with his writing, notably with his 1959 comedy "König Hirsch" ("King Stag"), adapted from a piece by Carlo Gozzi.

Zoff made his final visit to Germany in 1961 and stayed. He was now affected by the heart disease that would kill him. He died at Munich, on 14 December 1963, aged 73.
