= Der Winzerkönig =

- Country of origin: Austria

Der Winzerkönig is an Austrian television series.

== See also ==
- List of Austrian television series
