= Sinan Toprak ist der Unbestechliche =

- Starring: Erol Sander
- Country of origin: Germany

Sinan Toprak ist der Unbestechliche is a German television series.

== See also ==
- List of German television series
