= Solo für Weiss =

2016 German crime television film series

- Genre: Crime film
- Country of origin: Germany
- Original language: German
- No. of episodes: 4

Production
- Running time: 90 Minutes

Original release
- Network: ZDF
- Release: 7 November 2016

Solo für Weiss is a German crime television film series with Anna Maria Mühe in the role of a target investigator, Nora Weiss. The series was first produced in 2016 and was broadcast as the Television Movie of the week.

After two contiguous episodes were first broadcast in November 2016, the series continued a year and a half later with the release of the third episode. A fourth episode was shot in early 2018.

== Plot ==
Target investigator Nora Weiss has a godchild named Daina. Diana disappears on a ferry from Riga to Lübeck. Nora's new job with the Schleswig-Holstein Police allows her to take the case of her missing godchild from her predecessor, Jan Geissler, into her own hands because Weiss is working on the Mattner case. Ultimately, both cases come together when the child who is said to have killed Mattner has allegedly abducted as Daina. This connection causes the commissioner to track a very influential human trafficking ring. In order to motivate Nora to continue working on the case, her niece is released. Disagreements between a smuggler and a ring leader lead to the murder of a man. Weiss understands the motivations behind this man's murder, and becomes close to the criminal organization. She resorts to successful, but illegal means to free the girls held by the trafficking ring. Among the girls is Lisa Harms, the girl who allegedly assassinated Mattner, who was originally blamed in order to distract from the girls' human trafficking ring.

Weiss works with Simon Brandt, a colleague who moved from Dortmund to Lübeck. Over the course of their working relationship, the investigator realizes that Brandt has a gambling addiction.

Nora Weiss' father is a pastor and had helped citizens flee from the GDR.

== Episodes ==
Episode	Title	Original Broadcast date	Director	Ratings
1	Das verschwundene Mädchen	7 November 2016	Thomas Berger	5,84 Mio. (17,3 % MA)
2	Die Wahrheit hat viele Gesichter	9 November 2016	Thomas Berger	6,41 Mio. (19,8 % MA)
3	Es ist nicht vorbei	5 March 2018	Judith Kennel	7,25 Mio. (22,2 % MA)
4	Für immer schweigen		Maria von Heland	

== DVD releases ==
- 2018: Solo für Weiss – Die Filme 1–3, released on 29 June 2018 by Pandastorm Pictures
