= Thimo Meitner =

German actor

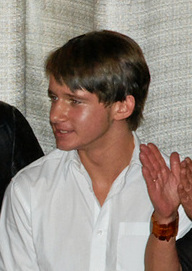
Thimo Meitner in 2010.

Theme Meitner (born 13 February 1994) is a German film actor.

== Life and career ==
Meitner first came into contact with acting at age seven, when his parents arranged for him to participate in the ZDF television show "Lass Dich Überraschen" with Thomas Ohrner. There he was able to meet his then idol Jan Fedder, who played the role of Dirk Matthies in the ARD primetime crime show "Großstadtrevier". Beginning with that encounter, Meitner's interest in acting was awakened. In 2004 he visited the children's theater club of the Württembergische Landesbühne Esslingen and performed there for one year.

Following a successful audition, he played the role of Zettel in the young people's television show "Ein Fall für B.A.R.Z." from 2005 to 2007. Since then he has appeared in several TV films including Das geteilte Glück (2009), which was named best television film of the year at the Biberach Film Festival in 2010. He has also appeared in television series such as SOKO 5113 and SOKO Stuttgart as well as in short films.

In 2012, Meitner completed his Abitur at the Georgii-Gymnasium in Esslingen am Neckar. From 2013 to 2017 he studied acting at the Hochschule für Schauspielkunst "Ernst Busch" in Berlin.

From 2017 to 2021 he appeared alongside Stephanie Stumph and Ludwig Blochberger as the third co-investigator assisting Jan-Gregor Kremp in the primetime ZDF crime show Der Alte, taking over the role of Lenny Wandmann from Michael Ande. Lenny Wandmann was not a police officer but rather a computer expert with Asperger's syndrome whose assignments lay in the fields of research and the analysis of computer data.
