= Die Kunst des Krieges =

- Tatort episode
- Episode no.: Season 38; Episode 992
- Directed by: Thomas Roth
- Written by: Thomas Roth
- Original air date: September 4, 2016

Episode chronology
← Previous "HAL"	Next → "Freitod"

Die Kunst des Krieges (transl. The Art of War) is the 992nd episode of the television series Tatort written and directed by Thomas Roth. It was ordered by the Austrian Broadcasting Corporation and produced by Superfilm The film was shot in Vienna and its environs. The official television premiere took place on Sunday, September 4, 2016.

== Plot summary ==
A gruesome murder of a man occurs in a villa on the outskirts of Vienna. The man had been tortured before he was killed. The detective Bibi Fellner (Adele Neuhauser) and her colleague Moritz Eisner (Harald Krassnitzer) begin investigating the incident. The cruelty of the murder leads the detectives to the conclusion that the victim was involved in organised crime activities. Inquiry finally puts the detectives on the trail of the pimp Andy Mittermeier (Michael Fuith) and his beautiful female bodyguard Mina Sandra Nomura "Asia" (Puti Kaisar-Mihara).

=== Partial cast listing ===
- Harald Krassnitzer as Moritz Eisner
- Adele Neuhauser as Bibi Fellner
- Simon Schwarz as Inkasso-Heinzi
- Puti Kaisar-Mihara as Mina Sandra Nomura
- Janina Rudenska as Victoria Oshchypko
- Daniel Wagner as Ramazan Tagaev

== See also ==
- Dead Pigeon on Beethoven Street (1974, Tatort episode 25)
- Reifezeugnis (1977, Tatort episode 73)
- There's Something About a War
