= Charlotte Schwab =

Swiss actress

- Born: 17 December 1952 (age 73); Basel, Switzerland
- Occupation: Actress
- Years active: 1981–present

Charlotte Schwab (born 17 December 1952) is a Swiss stage and television actress. She is best known for her performance as Anna Engelhardt in Alarm für Cobra 11 – Die Autobahnpolizei.
