= Heinrich Breloer =

German author and film director

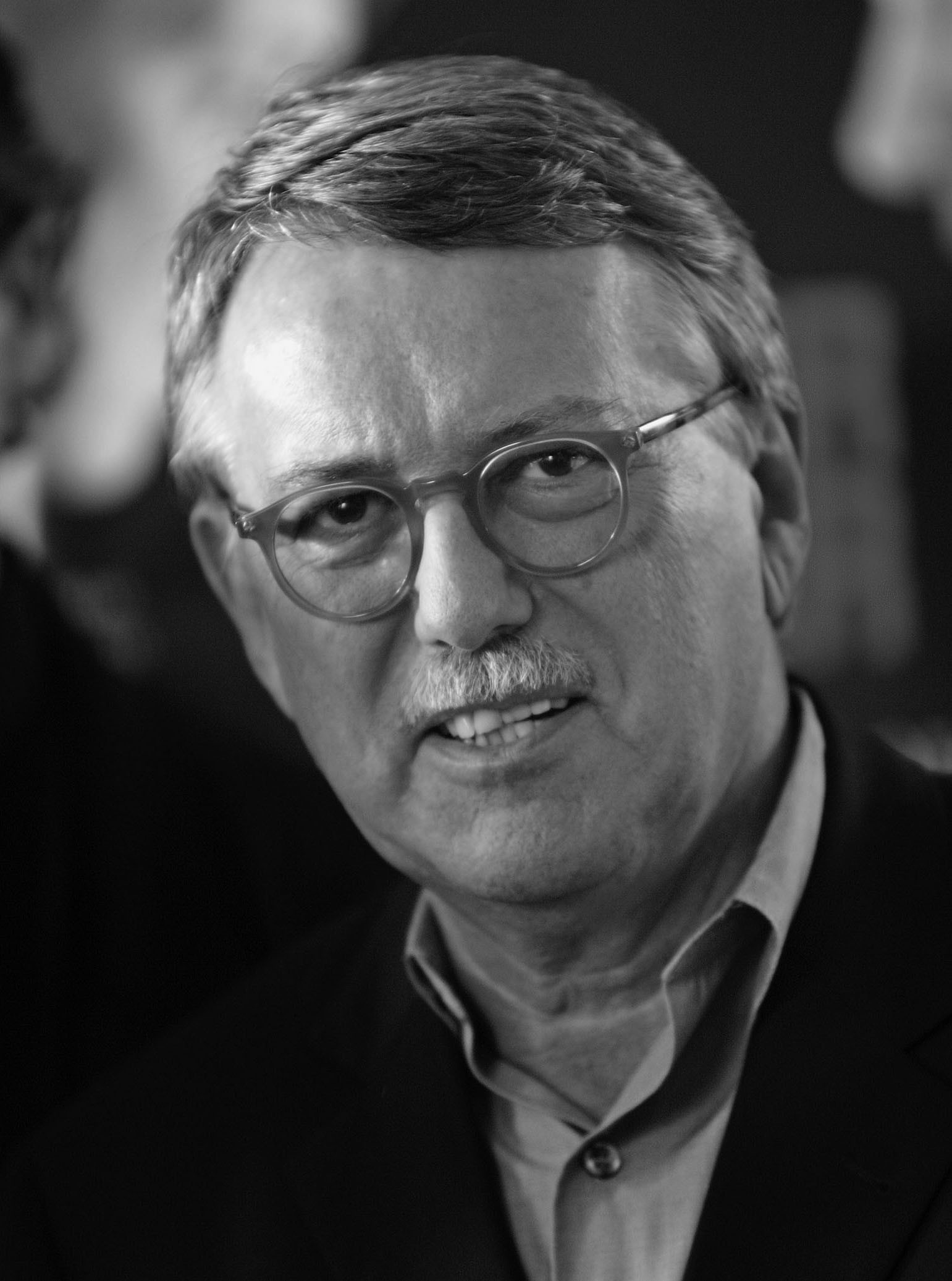
Heinrich Breloer, 2005

Heinrich Breloer (German pronunciation: [ˌbʀeˈløːɐ̯], born 17 February 1942 in Gelsenkirchen) is a German author and film director. He has mainly worked on docudramas related to modern German history and has received many awards. Breloer's 2005 docudrama Speer und Er was described as a milestone in the understanding of Nazi Germany by the German people.

== Selected filmography ==
- The Axe of Wandsbek (co-director: Horst Königstein, 1982, TV film) — based on a novel by Arnold Zweig
- Treffpunkt im Unendlichen (co-director: Horst Königstein, 1984, TV film) — based on a novel by Klaus Mann
- Eine geschlossene Gesellschaft (1987, TV film)
- The State Chancellery (1989, TV film) — (about Uwe Barschel)
- Kollege Otto – Die Coop-Affäre (1991, TV film) — (about Bernd Otto and the co op Affair)
- Wehner – die unerzählte Geschichte (1993, TV film) — (about Herbert Wehner)
- Death Game (1997, TV film) — (about the German Autumn)
- Die Manns – Ein Jahrhundertroman (2001, TV miniseries) — (about Thomas Mann)
- Speer und Er (2005, TV miniseries) — (about Albert Speer)
- Buddenbrooks (2008) — based on the novel Buddenbrooks by Thomas Mann
- Brecht (2019, TV film) — (about Bertolt Brecht)
