= Murataly Tagaev =

Kyrgyz politician (born 1978)

Mayor of Jalal-Abad
- Incumbent
- Assumed office 11 June 2018
- Preceded by: Salaidin Avazov

Personal details
- Born: Murataly Tagaev; 15 June 1978 (age 48) Suzak District, Kirghiz SSR, Soviet Union
- Party: Ata-Zhurt
- Relations: Asylbek Jêênbekov
- Children: 4
- Education: Kyrgyz State Academy of Law

Murataly Abdykarovich Tagaev (Russian: Мураталы Абдыкарович Тагаев; Kyrgyz: Мураталы Абдыкар уулу Тагаев; born 15 June 1978) is a Kyrgyz politician who has been serving as Mayor of Jalal-Abad since 2018.

== Career ==
- 2010–2012 Director General, shopping centre "Tagai Biy" (Crimean Tatar: Toğay bey), Jalal-Abad
- 2017–2018 Speaker of the city council of Jalal-Abad

== Personal life ==
He is fluent in both Kyrgyz and Russian, but he needs a dictionary to read in English.

== Awards and honours ==
- 2013: People’s Chairperson (Kyrgyz: элдик төрага)
- 2015: Honorary Citizen of Suzak District
