= Regine Lutz =

Swiss actress (1928–2023)

- Born: 22 December 1928; Basel, Switzerland
- Died: 17 December 2023 (aged 94); Neuss, Germany
- Occupation: Actress
- Known for: Member of the Berliner Ensemble
- Spouse: Hans Joachim Paulus (m. 1970)

Regine Lutz (22 December 1928 – 17 December 2023) was a Swiss actress. A longtime member of the Berliner Ensemble under Bertolt Brecht, she went on to perform at major German-language theaters in West Berlin, Munich, Wuppertal, Bremen, Hamburg and Basel, and later worked as an independent artist, author and teacher.

== Biography ==
Lutz was born in Basel on 22 December 1928, the daughter of Wilhelm Lutz, head of the dermatology clinic of the University of Basel, and of Hedwig Lutz, née Gutknecht. In 1970 she married the physician Hans Joachim Paulus.

== Career ==
Shortly after obtaining her Matura, Lutz became a trainee at the Schauspielhaus Zürich in 1947. Already in 1948, she played the cowherd in the premiere of Mr Puntila and his Man Matti by Bertolt Brecht, directed by the author himself. Engaged in 1949 with the newly founded Berliner Ensemble, she made her mark in 1950 in The Tutor by Jakob Michael Reinhold Lenz, staged by Brecht. She moved to West Berlin in 1960 and subsequently performed in Munich, Wuppertal and Bremen, before returning to Basel from 1968 to 1970.

After a break following her marriage, Lutz resumed her activity in 1972 and was part of the companies of Boy Gobert's Thalia Theater in Hamburg (1979) and the Schillertheater in Berlin (1980–1985). She then worked as an independent artist, performing in particular in Munich, Frankfurt am Main, Berlin and on tour.

The author of a handbook (Schauspieler – der schönste Beruf, 1993), she taught at various universities from 1993 onwards. She was named honorary professor of the Hochschule für Musik und Theater Rostock in 2005, appeared in numerous films and television films, and received many awards.

== Bibliography ==
- Deutsches Theater-Lexikon (DTS), pp. 1143–1144.
