= Marianne Zoff =

Austrian opera singer

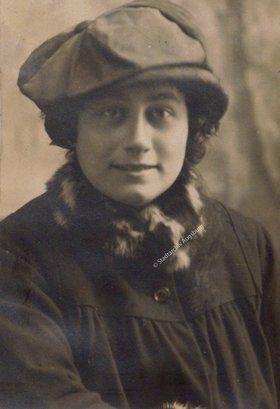
Marianne Zoff

Marianne Josephine Zoff (30 June 1893 – 22 November 1984) was an Austrian actress and opera singer (mezzo-soprano).

Zoff was born in Hainfeld, Lower Austria. Starting in 1919 at the Staatstheater Augsburg, she sang at several German opera houses, and until 1925 at the Theater Münster.

Zoff was the first wife of Bertolt Brecht, to whom she was married from 1922 until September 1927. Their daughter Hanne Marianne was born on 12 March 1923. The writer Otto Zoff was her older brother.

In 1928 Zoff married the actor Theo Lingen and Zoff's daughter Hanne grew up with her and Lingen. Lingen's popularity protected Zoff and her daughter, who were classified as half-Jews by the Nazi regime, from persecution. In 1928, Zoff and Lingen had a daughter, Ursula Lingen, who also was an actress.

Zoff died in 1984, aged 91, in Vienna and is buried at the Vienna Zentralfriedhof.

== Literature ==
- Brecht, Bertolt (1990). Briefe an Marianne Zoff und Hanne Hiob (in German). Suhrkamp Verlag. ISBN 3-518-40222-6.
- Häntzschel, Hiltrud (2002). Brechts Frauen (in German). Reinbek bei Hamburg: Rowohlt Verlag. ISBN 978-3-498-02964-7.
