= Buddenbrooks =

1901 novel by Thomas Mann

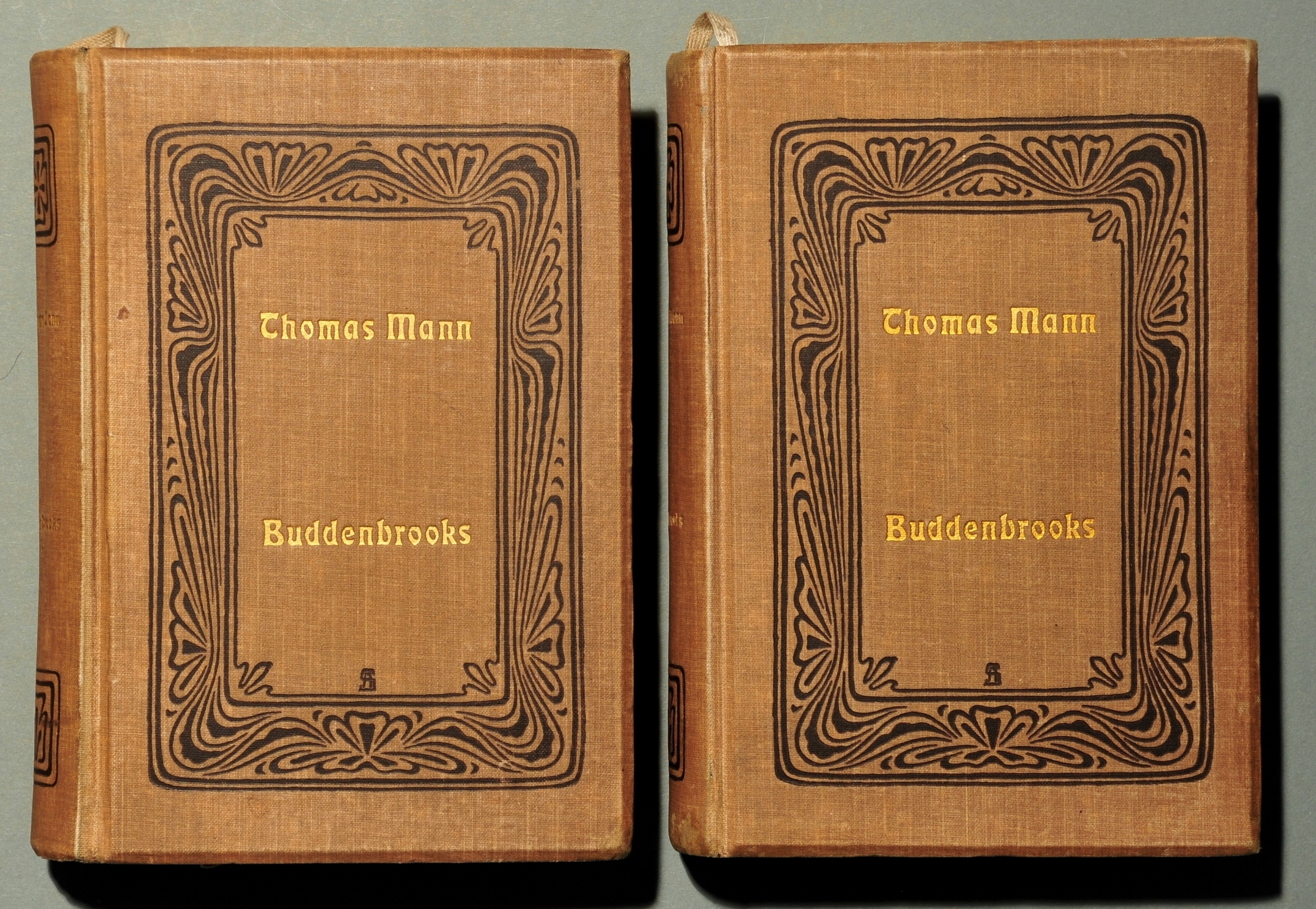
- First-edition covers (two volumes)
- Author: Thomas Mann
- Original title: Buddenbrooks: Verfall einer Familie
- Language: German
- Genre: Family saga
- Publisher: S. Fischer Verlag, Berlin
- Publication date: 1901
- Publication place: Germany
- OCLC: 16705387
- Dewey Decimal: 833.9/12
- Original text: Buddenbrooks: Verfall einer Familie online

Buddenbrooks or The Buddenbrooks (Note: Although the first two English translations are titled Buddenbrooks, the third is titled The Buddenbrooks. The third translation states that it is "the first to have the correct English title, The Buddenbrooks. In German, it is usual to refer to a family without the definite article ... when the article is expected in English". Mann, Thomas (2026). The Buddenbrooks, translated by Mike Mitchell, "Note on the Translation", p. xxiii.) (German: [ˈbʊdn̩ˌbʁoːks]) is a 1901 novel by Thomas Mann, chronicling the decline of a wealthy north German merchant family over the course of four generations, incidentally portraying the manner of life and mores of the Hanseatic bourgeoisie in the years from 1835 to 1877. Mann drew deeply from the history of his own family, the Mann family of Lübeck, and their milieu.

It was Mann's first novel, published when he was twenty-six years old. With the publication of the second edition in 1903, Buddenbrooks became a literary success. Its English translation by Helen Tracy Lowe-Porter was published in 1924. The work led to a Nobel Prize in Literature for Mann in 1929; although the Nobel award generally recognises an author's body of work, the Swedish Academy's citation for Mann identified "his great novel Buddenbrooks" as the principal reason for his prize.

Mann began writing the novel in October 1897, when he was twenty-two years old, and completed it three years later, in July 1900. It was published in 1901. His objective was to write a novel on the conflicts between the worlds of the businessman and the artist, presented as a family saga, continuing in the realist tradition of such 19th-century works as Stendhal's Le Rouge et le Noir (1830; The Red and the Black). Buddenbrooks is his most popular novel, especially in Germany, where it has been cherished for its intimate portrait of 19th-century German bourgeois life.

Before Buddenbrooks Mann had written only short stories, which had been collected under the title Der kleine Herr Friedemann (1898, Little Herr Friedemann). They portrayed spiritually challenged figures who struggle to find happiness in (or at the margins of) bourgeois society. Similar themes appear in the Buddenbrooks, but in a fully developed style that already reflects the mastery of narrative, subtle irony of tone, and rich character descriptions of Mann's mature fiction.

The exploration of decadence in the novel reflects the influence of Schopenhauer's The World as Will and Representation (1818, 1844) on the young Mann. The Buddenbrooks of successive generations experience a gradual decline of their finances and family ideals, finding happiness increasingly elusive as values change and old hierarchies are challenged by Germany's rapid industrialisation. The characters who subordinate their personal happiness to the welfare of the family firm encounter reverses, as do those who do not.

The city where the Buddenbrooks live shares so many street names and other details with Mann's native town of Lübeck that the identification is unmistakable, although the novel makes no mention of the name. The young author was condemned for writing a scandalous, defamatory roman à clef about (supposedly) recognisable personages. Mann defended the right of a writer to use material from his experience.

The years covered in the novel were marked by political and military developments that reshaped Germany, such as the revolutions of 1848, the Austro-Prussian War, and the establishment of the German Empire. Historic events generally remain in the background, having no direct bearing on the lives of the characters.

== Plot summary ==
In 1835, the wealthy and respected Buddenbrooks, a family of grain merchants, invite their friends and relatives to dinner in their new home in Lübeck. The family consists of patriarch Johann Buddenbrook Jr. and his wife Antoinette; their son Johann III ("Jean") and his wife Elisabeth; and the latter's three school-age children, sons Thomas and Christian and daughter Antonie ("Tony"). They have several servants, most notably Ida Jungmann, whose job is to care for the children. During the evening, a letter arrives from Gotthold, the estranged son of the elder Johann and half-brother of the younger. The elder Johann disapproves of Gotthold's life choices, and ignores the letter. Johann III and Elisabeth later have another daughter, Klara.

As the older children grow up, their personalities begin to show. Diligent and industrious Thomas seems likely to inherit the business. Christian is more interested in entertainment and leisure. Tony has grown quite conceited and spurns an advance from the son of another up-and-coming family, Hermann Hagenström. Hermann takes it in stride, but Tony bears a grudge against him for the rest of her life. The elder Johann and Antoinette die, and the younger Johann takes over the business, and gives Gotthold his fair share of the inheritance. The half-brothers will never be close and Gotthold's three spinster daughters continue to resent Johann's side of the family, and delight in their misfortune over the coming years. Thomas goes to Amsterdam to study, while Tony goes to boarding school. After finishing school, Tony remains lifelong friends with her former teacher, Therese "Sesemi" Weichbrodt.

An obsequious businessman, Bendix Grünlich, of Hamburg, introduces himself to the family, and Tony dislikes him on sight. To avoid him, she takes a vacation in Travemünde, a Baltic resort northeast of Lübeck, where she meets Morten Schwarzkopf, a medical student in whom she is interested romantically. She yields to pressure from her father, and marries Grünlich, against her better judgement, in 1846. She gives birth to a daughter, Erika. Later it is revealed that Grünlich had been cooking his books to hide unpayable debt, and had married Tony solely in the hope that Johann would bail him out. Johann refuses, and takes Tony and Erika home with him instead. Grünlich goes bankrupt, and Tony divorces him in 1850.

Christian begins traveling, going as far as Valparaíso, Chile. At the same time, Thomas comes home, and Johann puts him to work at the business. During the revolutions of 1848, Johann is able to calm an angry mob with a speech. He and Elizabeth become increasingly religious in their twilight years. Johann dies in 1855, and Thomas takes over the business. Christian comes home and initially goes to work for his brother, but he has neither the interest nor the aptitude for commerce. He complains of bizarre illnesses and gains a reputation as a fool, a drunk, a womanizer and a teller of tall tales. Thomas, coming to despise his brother, sends him away, to protect his and his business's reputation. Later, Thomas marries Gerda Arnoldsen, a daughter of a wealthy Amsterdam merchant, a violin virtuoso and Tony's former schoolmate.

Klara marries Sievert Tiburtius, a pastor from Riga, but she dies of tuberculosis without issue. Tony marries her second husband, Alois Permaneder, a provincial but honest hops merchant from Munich. Once he has her dowry in hand, he invests the money and retires, intending to live off his interest and dividends, while spending his days in his local bar. Tony is unhappy in Munich, where her family name impresses no one, where her favorite seafoods are unavailable at any price in the days before refrigeration, where even the dialect is noticeably different from hers. She gives birth to another baby, but it dies on the same day it is born, leaving her heartbroken. Tony later leaves Permaneder after she discovers him drunkenly trying to grope the maid. She and Erika return to Lübeck. Somewhat surprisingly, Permaneder writes her a letter apologizing for his behavior, agreeing not to challenge the divorce, and returning the dowry.

In the early 1860s, Thomas becomes a father and a senator. He builds an ostentatious mansion and soon regrets it, as maintaining the new house proves to be a considerable drain on his time and money. The old house, now too big for the number of people living in it, falls into disrepair. Thomas suffers many setbacks and losses in his business. His hard work keeps the business afloat, but it is clearly taking its toll on him. Thomas throws a party to celebrate the business's centennial in 1868, during which he receives news that one of his risky business deals has resulted in yet another loss.

Erika, grown up, marries Hugo Weinschenk, a manager at a fire insurance company, and delivers a daughter, Elizabeth. Weinschenk is arrested for insurance fraud and is sent to prison. Thomas's son, Johann IV ("Hanno"), is born a weak, sickly runt and remains one as he grows. He is withdrawn, melancholic, easily upset and frequently bullied by other children. His only friend, Kai Mölln, is a dishevelled young count, a remnant of the medieval aristocracy, who lives with his eccentric father outside Lübeck. Johann does poorly in school, but he discovers an aptitude for music, clearly inherited from his mother. This helps him bond with his uncle Christian, but Thomas is disappointed by his son.

In 1871, the elder Elizabeth dies of pneumonia. Tony, Erika and little Elizabeth sadly move out of their old house, which is then sold, at a disappointing price, to Hermann Hagenström, who is now a successful businessman. Christian expresses his desire to marry Aline, a woman of questionable morals with three illegitimate children, one of whom may or may not be Christian's. Thomas, who controls their mother's inheritance, forbids him. Thomas sends Johann to Travemünde to improve his health. Johann loves the peace and solitude of the resort, but returns home no stronger than before. Weinschenk is released from prison, a disgraced and broken man. He soon abandons his wife and daughter and leaves Germany, never to return.

Thomas, becoming increasingly depressed and exhausted by the demands of keeping up his faltering business, devotes ever more time and attention to his appearance, and begins to suspect his wife may be cheating on him. In 1874, he takes a vacation with Christian and a few of his old friends to Travemünde during the off season, where they discuss life, religion, business and the unification of Germany. In 1875, he collapses and dies after a visit to his dentist. His complete despair and lack of confidence in his son and sole heir are obvious in his will, in which he directed that his business be liquidated. All the assets, including the mansion, are sold at distress prices, and faithful servant Ida is dismissed.

Christian gains control of his share of his father's inheritance and then marries Aline, but his illnesses and bizarre behavior get him admitted to an insane asylum, leaving Aline free to dissipate Christian's money. Johann still hates school, and he passes his classes only by cheating. His health and constitution are still weak, and it is hinted that he might be homosexual. Except for his friend Count Kai, he is held in contempt by everyone outside his immediate family, even his pastor. In 1877, he takes ill with typhoid fever and soon dies. His mother, Gerda, returns to Amsterdam, leaving an embittered Tony, her daughter Erika and granddaughter Elizabeth (accompanied in the table by their adopted cousin Tilda and Gotthold's three daughters) as the only remnants of the once proud Buddenbrook family, with only the elderly and increasingly infirm Therese Weichbrodt to offer any friendship or moral support. Facing destitution, they cling to their wavering belief that they may be reunited with their family in the afterlife, a wavering that precisely the hunched and little Mrs. Weichbrodt tries to dispel with her last encouraging words of conviction.

== Themes ==
One of the more famous aspects of Thomas Mann's prose style can be seen in the use of leitmotifs. Derived from his admiration for the operas of Richard Wagner, in the case of Buddenbrooks an example can be found in the description of the color – blue and yellow, respectively – of the skin and the teeth of the characters. Each such description alludes to different states of health, personality and even the destiny of the characters. Rotting teeth are also a symbol of decay and decadence because it implies indulging in too many cavity-causing foods. An example of this would be Hanno's cup of hot chocolate at breakfast.

Aspects of Thomas Mann's personality are manifest in the two main male representatives of the third and the fourth generations of the fictional family, Thomas Buddenbrook and his son Hanno Buddenbrook. It should not be considered a coincidence that Mann shared the same first name as one of them. Thomas Buddenbrook reads a chapter of Schopenhauer's The World as Will and Idea, and the character of Hanno Buddenbrook escapes from real-life worries into the realm of music, Wagner's Tristan und Isolde in particular. (Wagner was of bourgeois descent and decided to dedicate himself to art.) In this sense both Buddenbrooks reflect a conflict experienced by the author: departure from a conventional bourgeois life to pursue an artistic one, although without rejecting bourgeois ethics. A theme of Thomas Mann's novels, the conflict between art and business, is already a dominant force in this work. Music also plays an important role: Hanno Buddenbrook, like his mother, tends to be an artist and musician, and not a person of commerce like his father.

== Literary significance and criticism ==
Lübeck's patrician Hanseatic families resented Mann's daring to describe their caste with what they felt was mockery. He did not intend to write an epic against contemporary aristocratic society and its conventions. Mann often sympathizes with its Protestant ethics and criticizes with irony and detachment. When Die protestantische Ethik und der Geist des Kapitalismus (1905, The Protestant Ethic and the Spirit of Capitalism) by Max Weber was published, Mann recognised its affinities with his novel.

Before writing the novel, Mann conducted research to depict in detail the conditions of the times and even the mundane aspects of the lives of his characters. His cousin Marty provided him with substantial information on the economics of Lübeck, including grain prices and the city's economic decline. Mann carried out financial analyses to present the economic information provided in the book accurately. Accurate information through extensive research was a feature of Mann's other novels as well. Some characters in Buddenbrooks speak in the Low German of northern Germany.

The novel's detailed treatment of prices, debts, inheritances, and commercial calculations reflects the changing monetary culture of nineteenth-century Lübeck. Its early chapters still reckon in marks courant and schillings, the older currency system, while the final chapters overlap with the introduction of the imperial mark and the new Reich-wide monetary order. Mann keeps these reforms largely offstage, folding them into the everyday transactions and accounting habits of the merchant class. Political and monetary unification thus enters the novel not as an abstract event but as a practical change in Hanseatic business life.

In the conversations appearing in the early parts of the book, many of the characters switch back and forth between German and French. The French appears in the original within Mann's German text, similar to the practice of Tolstoy in War and Peace. The bilingual characters are of the older generation, who were already adults during the Napoleonic Wars; in later parts of the book, with the focus shifting to the family's younger generation against the background of Germany moving towards unification and assertion of its new role as a great European power, the use of French by the characters diminishes.

All occurrences in the lives of the characters are seen by the narrator and the family members in relation to the family trade business, the sense of duty and destiny accompanying it as well as the economic consequences that events bring. Through births, marriages, and deaths, the business becomes almost a fetish or a religion, especially for some characters, notably Thomas and his sister Tony. The treatment of the female main character Tony Buddenbrook in the novel resembles that of the 19th-century realists (Flaubert's Madame Bovary and Tolstoy's Anna Karenina), but from a more ironic and less tragic point of view.

Mann's emotional description of the Frau Consul's death has been noted as a significant and eloquent literary treatment of death and the subject's awareness of the death process.

William Faulkner considered it to be the greatest novel of the 20th century.

== Thomas Buddenbrook and Schopenhauer ==
In part 10, chapter 5, Thomas Mann described Thomas Buddenbrook's encounter with Arthur Schopenhauer's philosophy. When he read the second volume of Schopenhauer's The World as Will and Representation, Thomas Buddenbrook was strongly affected by chapter 41, entitled "On Death and Its Relation to the Indestructibility of Our Inner Nature". From this chapter's influence, he had such thoughts as "Where shall I be when I am dead? ...I shall be in all those who have ever, do ever, or ever shall say 'I' " ..."Who, what, how could I be if I were not—if this my external self, my consciousness, did not cut me off from those who are not I?"..."soon will that in me which loves you be free and be in and with you – in and with you all." "I shall live...Blind, thoughtless, pitiful eruption of the urging will!" Schopenhauer had written that "Egoism really consists in man's restricting all reality to his own person, in that he imagines he lives in this alone, and not in others. Death teaches him something better, since it abolishes this person, so that man's true nature, that is his will, will henceforth live only in other individuals." According to this teaching, there really is no self to lose when death occurs. What is usually considered to be the self is really the same in all people and animals, at all times and everywhere. Irvin D. Yalom had a character in his novel describe it:

...essentially it described a dying patriarch having an epiphany in which the boundaries dissolved between himself and others. As a result he was comforted by the unity of all life and the idea that after death he would return to the life force whence he came and hence retain his connectedness with all living things.

— Irvin D. Yalom, The Schopenhauer Cure, ch. 32

A few days after reading Schopenhauer, "his middle-class instincts" brought Thomas Buddenbrook back to his former belief in a personal Father God and in Heaven, the home of departed individual souls. There could be no consolation if conscious personal identity is lost at death. The novel ends with the surviving characters' firm consoling belief that there will be a large family reunion, in the afterlife, of all the individual Buddenbrook personalities.

== English translations ==
The first English translation, published in 1924, was by Helen Tracy Lowe-Porter.

In 1993, an English translation by John E. Woods was published.

In 2023, Damion Searls published a translation of "A Day in the Life of Hanno Buddenbrook", which he explained "was originally part 11, chapters 2 and 3, of Mann's first novel, Buddenbrooks, but he considered it something of an independent work.... The title is provided by me".

In 2026, Oxford University Press published a translation by Mike Mitchell, which titles the novel The Buddenbrooks.

== Film and television adaptations ==
A silent film version directed by Gerhard Lamprecht was filmed in Lübeck and released in 1923.

Alfred Weidenmann directed the two-part television film The Buddenbrooks (1959), starring Liselotte Pulver, Nadja Tiller, Hansjörg Felmy, Hanns Lothar, Lil Dagover and Werner Hinz.

A seven-part dramatisation by Jack Pulman was broadcast on BBC-2 in November and December 1965, starring Nigel Stock as Thomas, Kenneth Griffith as Christian and Elizabeth Shepherd as Tony.

Franz Peter Wirth directed an 11-episode television series (1979). It was filmed in Gdańsk, which had been less damaged by war than Lübeck was.

Another film version, starring Armin Mueller-Stahl, was released in 2008.

== See also ==
- Best German Novels of the Twentieth Century
