= Menuhin =

Menuhin or Menuchin is an Ashkenazi Jewish matronymic surname derived from the female name Menuha/Menucha. Notable people with the surname include:

- Diana Menuhin
- Gerard Menuhin (born 1948), author, son of Yehudi
- Hephzibah Menuhin (1920–1981), American-Jewish concert pianist
- Jeremy Menuhin (born 1951), British pianist, son of Yehudi
- Joel Ryce-Menuhin (1933–1998), Jungian psychologist
- Linda Menuhin (born 1950), Iraqi-born Israeli journalist, editor, and blogger
- Moshe Menuhin (1893–1983), teacher and author, father of Yehudi, Hephzibah and Yaltah Menuhin
- Yaltah Menuhin (1921–2001), American-Jewish pianist
- Yehudi Menuhin (1916–1999), American-Jewish (later Swiss, then British) violin virtuoso and conductor

== See also ==
- Mnuchin
- Minuchin
