= Gerard Menuhin =

Holocaust denier and neo-Nazi

Gerard Menuhin (born July 23, 1948 in Scotland) is a Holocaust denier and activist, associated with the neo-Nazi movement in Germany. He is of English and Jewish descent.

His book Tell the Truth and Shame the Devil, published in 2015, argues that the Holocaust is "the biggest lie in history", that Jews are an "alien, demonic force which seeks to dominate the world", that "Jews are flooding Europe with non-white races" to create a "society of racial mongrels, under the rule of a 'new Jewish nobility'", and plan to "create a one-world government". Menuhin argues that "the world owes Adolf Hitler an apology".

He is the son of the violinist Yehudi Menuhin and dancer Diana Gould, and brother of pianist Jeremy Menuhin. He is the grandson of anti-Zionist author and campaigner Moshe Menuhin, who was from a distinguished, religious Lithuanian Jewish family. He is descended from the lineage of Rabbi Shneur Zalman of Liadi, the founder of Chabad Hassidism, as well as Rabbi Levi Yitzchok of Berditchev.

== Background ==
Born in July 1948 in Scotland, he is the son of violinist Yehudi Menuhin, who was Jewish, and Diana Gould, an English ballerina. He attended Eton College, completing his studies at Stanford University in California. The brother of the pianist Jeremy Menuhin, Gerard did not want to follow in the footsteps of his father or brother and decided to enter into acting. In London's Mermaid Theatre, he landed a role in the Erich Kästner-piece Emil and the Detectives.

In December 1970, when Menuhin was 22, he and his father temporarily lost their American citizenship after they were granted Swiss citizenship, as American law at the time did not permit dual citizenship.

In 1985, he published his first book, a novel, Elmer, which was panned by Ian Murray of the Glasgow Herald.

Menuhin was, until November 2005, the CEO of the German chapter of the Yehudi Menuhin Foundation (YMF). He was representative of the Menuhin family on the Board of the Menuhin Festival Gstaad in Gstaad, Switzerland. In June 2007, he took up the post as president of the Yehudi Menuhin Foundation in Grenchen, Switzerland. Since 2009, there is no indication to be found of Menuhin's continuing administrative position with the Menuhin Festival Gstaad.

He has previously worked for Menuhin IP Management GmbH (Menuhin IP Management Ltd liab Co) (Menuhin IP Management Sàrl) in Schöfflisdorf which owns the official Yehudi Menuhin website. The content of the website, however, is controlled by two of Yehudi Menuhin's other children, Jeremy Menuhin and Zamira Menuhin Benthall, as directors of SYM Music Company Limited.

== Controversy over extremist views ==
A supporter of Adolf Hitler, Menuhin writes about Jews: "It remains for Jews only to imitate or destroy what they can never have or become, and to undermine the homogeneous social fabric via their political stooges, by civil-war-induced migrations and so-called anti-discriminatory legislation, including attacks on such core values as the traditional family, through contrived 'gender neutral' and radical feminist ideologies and 'movements.'"

He considers himself anti-Zionist. Until 2005, his political views had barely registered with the outside world, even though he has a regular column in the Munich-based ultra-German nationalist National Zeitung. Because of Gerard Menuhin's extremist or nationalistic utterances, he was relieved of his post as chairman on 12 November 2005 by the Yehudi Menuhin Foundation Germany. The London Times Berlin correspondent Roger Boyes reported a few days later, that Menuhin had "outed himself as a clear sympathiser with the neo-Nazi cause in two interviews he gave. In Deutsche Stimme," the newspaper of the far-right National Democratic Party of Germany (NDP), "he used classical anti-Semitic language while still staying within the boundaries of German law".

"Apart from a few curious comments about America, we weren't really aware of his politics", Winfried Kneip, YMF's chief executive, said. Alarmed by press reports, from the Spiegel website among others, the Foundation took notice, that Gerard Menuhin had given interviews to the National Zeitung, writing a column named "Menuhin and how he sees the world", and also in the newspaper of the far-right NDP's Deutsche Stimme (German Voice).

In November 2014, Israeli media referred to Menuhin as an example of a "Jewish anti-Semite" and "anti-Israel extremist". An article in The Jerusalem Post asserted that he "authored columns in the National-Zeitung, a paper infamous for its neo-Nazi and right-wing extremist ideas. He has also provided a fiercely anti-Israel interview with the pro-Iranian regime extremist German-language website, Muslim-Markt."

Gerard Menuhin's book Tell the Truth and Shame the Devil was published in 2015. According to Menuhin, the Holocaust is "the biggest lie in history" and "Germany has no blame for the Second World War".

== Personal life ==
Menuhin married Eva Struyvenberg in New York in March 1983, the daughter of Albert Struyvenberg from Seattle. In 1990, he and Eva had one child together, Maxwell Duncan Menuhin, but later divorced.

== Bibliography ==
- Elmer, Hutchinson, 1985, ISBN 978-0091599003.
- Die Antwort, FZ-Verlag, 2007, ISBN 978-3-924309-81-7 (German).
- Tell the Truth and Shame the Devil, Barnes Review, 2015, ISBN 978-1937787295.
- Lies & Gravy: Landmarks in Human Decay, Castle Hill Publishers, 2019, ISBN 978-1591489894.
- Lived It Wrong: An Autobiography, Reconquista Press, 2020, ISBN 978-1-912853-16-8.
