= Oak Ridge Symphony Orchestra =

The Oak Ridge Symphony Orchestra is a professional community-based symphony orchestra in Oak Ridge, Tennessee. Celebrating 80 Years Nov 3rd.

The founder and first conductor was Waldo Cohn, a Manhattan Project biochemist and an accomplished cellist who started hosting chamber music sessions in his home upon arriving in Oak Ridge in 1943. As the group grew, they began rehearsing in the high school and gave their first concert in June 1944 under the name Oak Ridge Symphonette. Brass and woodwinds were added to the group later that year, and the first full symphonic orchestra concert was in November 1944. In his later years, Cohn recalled that some of the amateur musicians in the orchestra had difficulty attending rehearsals because of World War II fuel rationing, the difficulty of travel on streets that were not paved, and round-the-clock operating schedules at Oak Ridge's Manhattan Project production facilities that required them to work at night. Oak Ridge residents have boasted that the new city had a symphony orchestra before it had sidewalks.

The orchestra has been in continuous existence since its formation in 1944. Many of the early members of the orchestra left Oak Ridge at the end of World War II, so professional musicians began to be hired to augment the amateur volunteers. Virtuoso violinist Isaac Stern appeared with the orchestra as a soloist in 1948 as a favor to Cohn. Other early soloists included Percy Grainger, Yaltah Menuhin, Nadia Reisenberg, Samuel Sanders, and Albert Spalding. In more recent years, soloists have included U.S. Senator Lamar Alexander, water percussionist David Cossin, and virtuoso bassist Edgar Meyer, a graduate of Oak Ridge High School.

Cohn continued to serve as conductor until 1955. Under his leadership, the orchestra concentrated on a traditional classical repertoire but also introduced works by American composers such as Edward McDowell and Henry Cowell. In 1952 the symphony presented the premiere performance of Overture to a Dedication of a Nuclear Reactor, composed by Arthur Roberts and considered to be "the first serious musical composition inspired by the atomic age." The Overture was dedicated to Cohn, who was conductor for the premiere.

In 2008, the orchestra launched a series of concerts called "Isotone," designed to connect music with science. The Isotone concerts feature original compositions written as tributes to famous physicists and include scientific equipment from the collection of the American Museum of Science and Energy. The February 2010 Isotone Concert presented the premiere performance of a 12-minute composition by Larry Spivak entitled Space; a van de Graaff generator was used in the performance to create effects of lightning. Items such as Geiger counters have been used in other concerts. The first two seasons' compositions honored Marie Curie, Richard Feynman, and Stephen Hawking. The compositions for the 2010–2011 season honored Glenn Seaborg and Lise Meitner.

Dan Allcott became the Oak Ridge Symphony conductor beginning with the 2010–2011 season. He succeeded Cornelia Kodkani-Laemmli, who had led the orchestra for several years.
