= Marcel Ciampi =

French musician (1891–1980)

Marcel Paul Maximin Ciampi (29 May 1891 – 2 September 1980) was a French pianist and teacher. He held the longest tenure in the history of the Conservatoire National Supérieur de Musique de Paris and also became head of piano classes at the Yehudi Menuhin School in England.

== Life ==
Ciampi was taught by Louis Diémer at the Paris Conservatoire and won the first prize for piano in 1909. He had a career as a concert pianist, appearing with orchestras in France, London, Amsterdam, Brussels, Prague, Warsaw, Sofia and Athens. He was also a pupil of Isidor Philipp, who headed the Piano Department at the Paris Conservatory for many years. He worked closely with Claude Debussy.

He turned to teaching and had a particular influence on Hephzibah Menuhin and her sister Yaltah Menuhin, and in sum, all the Menuhin family. He accepted Yaltah at age four, after hearing her play Robert Schumann's Kinderszenen. His students also included Yvonne Loriod, Cécile Ousset, Thea Musgrave, John Carmichael, Jeremy Menuhin, Míceál O'Rourke, Jean-Marc Luisada, Pierre Hétu, Kathryn Stott, Melvyn Tan, Nancy Bricard, Avi Schönfeld, Beryl Sedivka, Albert Attenelle, Anna-Marie Globenski, Éric Heidsieck, Jacqueline Cole, and Sally Sargent. Another of his students was John-Paul Bracey, who was to become his biographer.

Ciampi recorded some early electrical solo and chamber music discs for French Columbia. His available recordings on CD include César Franck's Piano Quintet with the Capet Quartet.

His wife, Yvonne Astruc, was a violinist. His sister Gabrielle Ritter-Ciampi was an operatic soprano.

His compositions include Six Studies for the piano. He was a jury member on competitions such as the Alexander Brailowsky Competition in Liège and the Eugène Ysaÿe Competition in Brussels.

Ciampi was appointed an Officer of the Légion d'honneur and the Belgian Order of Léopold. He died in 1980.

== Sources ==
- Eric Blom, ed., Grove's Dictionary of Music and Musicians, 5th edition (1954)
