= Cecil Harcourt =

Royal Navy Admiral (1892–1959)

Admiral Sir Cecil Harcourt GBE KCB
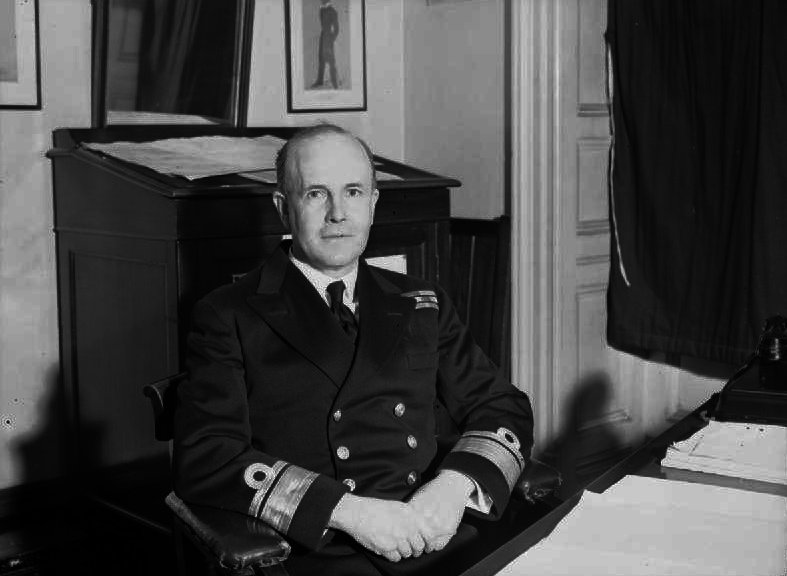
- Harcourt during World War II

Governor of Hong Kong
- Military administration
- In office 1 September 1945 – 1 May 1946
- Monarch: George VI
- Preceded by: Franklin Gimson
- Succeeded by: Mark Aitchison Young

Personal details
- Born: 11 April 1892 Bromley, Kent, England
- Died: 19 December 1959 (aged 67) Chelsea, London, England
- Education: Royal Naval College
- Awards: KCB (1945); GBE (1953)

Military service
- Allegiance: United Kingdom
- Branch/service: Royal Navy
- Years of service: 1904–1952
- Rank: Admiral
- Battles/wars: First World War; Second World War

Admiral Sir Cecil Halliday Jepson Harcourt GBE KCB (translated to Chinese as 夏慤; haa6 kok3; 11 April 1892 – 19 December 1959) was a British naval officer. He was the de facto governor of Hong Kong as commander-in-chief and head of the military administration from September 1945 to May 1946. He was called by the Chinese name "Ha Kok", a reference to the fourth-century Chinese nobleman Chung Kok.

== Military career ==
Harcourt was born in Bromley, Kent, England, to Halliday Harcourt and Grace Lilian (née Jepson) on 11 April 1892. He was educated at Fonthill, East Grinstead, and later at the Royal Naval Colleges at Osborne and Dartmouth (1904–1908). He had a distinguished career in the Royal Navy, which he entered on 15 September 1904, at the age of 12. He served in both world wars.

In 1939, Harcourt was appointed Director of the Admiralty's Operations Division. In 1941 he was Flag Captain of the Home Fleet, while commanding HMS Duke of York. In August 1942 until January 1943 he commanded the 10th Cruiser Squadron of the Home Fleet. From 1942 to 1944 he took part in the North Africa campaign, the capture of Tunisia, Pantelleria, Lampedusa, and Sicily, and the landing at Salerno. In 1944, he became Naval Secretary. In 1945, he was Flag Officer Commanding 11th Aircraft Carrier Squadron, with his flag in HMS Colossus.

Harcourt commanded Task Group 111.2 for the reoccupation of Hong Kong with his carriers, three cruisers, four destroyers, a submarine, and mine-sweeping flotillas. He ordered his carriers' planes to destroy a small number of Japanese suicide motor boats near Hong Kong. The pre-war colonial secretary Franklin Gimson took Harcourt to the prisoner of war camps and hospitals. Their first stop was the Stanley Internment Camp, which Harcourt reported:

On arriving we found everyone awaiting us and we had a most unforgettable welcome. The Union Flag had been produced by an ex-Naval rating who had hidden it in his bedding when Hong Kong was captured and had managed to hide it for the whole period so as to be ready for this occasion. The morale ... was extremely high despite the obvious effects of malnutrition which could be seen on every face. The enthusiasm and the cheering really had to be seen and heard to be believed, it was so obviously spontaneous and seemed to express the pent-up feelings of all these years. I shall never forget it.

On 16 September, Harcourt received the surrender of Japan (under Major-General Umekichi Okada and Vice-Admiral Ruitarō Fujita) in Government House. He was the de facto governor of Hong Kong as commander-in-chief and head of the military administration until May 1946. On 18 December 1945, he was made a Knight Commander of the Order of the Bath (KCB). In 1946, he was promoted to vice-admiral.

In 1947, Harcourt became Flag Officer (Air) and Second in Command Mediterranean Fleet. In 1948, he became Second Sea Lord and Chief of Naval Personnel as well as a Lord Commissioner of the Admiralty, promoted to Admiral in 1949, and in 1950 Commander-in-Chief, The Nore. He retired in 1952. He died en route to St Stephen's Hospital, Chelsea, London, on 19 December 1959. A memorial service was held at St Martin-in-the-Fields in January 1960.

== Commands ==
Ships (and station) under Harcourt's command included:

- HMS Wessex (1931)
- HMS Stuart (1935; leader of the Australian Destroyer Flotilla)
- HMS President (1939)
- HMS Duke of York (1941)
- HMS Sheffield (1942)
- HMS Aurora (1942)
- HMS Cleopatra (1943)
- HMS Venerable (1945)
- HMS Tamar (1945, as Administrator of Hong Kong from shore station)
- HMS Newfoundland (1943)
- HMS Swiftsure (1945, used to hoist flag during restoration of British command in Hong Kong from Japanese control)

== Family ==
On 17 April 1913, he assumed the surname "Harcourt-Morris", but this lasted only a short time.

In 1920 he became the second husband of the English pianist Evelyn Suart, a widow. They had no children of their own. One of her daughters by her first marriage was the noted ballerina Diana Gould, who later became the second wife of the violinist Yehudi Menuhin. Her sister Griselda became the second wife of the pianist Louis Kentner. After Evelyn Suart's death in 1950, Harcourt married Stella, widow of Air Commodore David Waghorn, in 1953.

== Honours ==
Harcourt's honours:

- Commander of the Order of the British Empire (CBE), 1940
- Legion of Merit, November 1942
- Companion of the Order of the Bath (CB), 1943
- Knight Commander of the Order of the Bath (KCB), 18 December 1945
- Grand Cordon of the Order of the Cloud and Banner, 1946
- Order of St. Olav, 1951
- Order of the Dannebrog, 1952
- Knight Grand Cross of the Order of the British Empire (GBE), 1953

== Namesakes ==
- Harcourt Road, Hong Kong
- Harcourt Garden, Hong Kong

Military offices
Preceded by Frederick Dalrymple-Hamilton	Naval Secretary; 1944–1945	Succeeded by Claud Barry
Political offices
Preceded by Franklin Charles Gimson; Provisional Government as Governor of Hong Kong	Administrator of Hong Kong; 1945–1946	Succeeded by Sir Mark Young as Governor of Hong Kong
Military offices
Preceded by Sir Arthur Power	Second Sea Lord; 1948–1950	Succeeded by Sir Alexander Madden
Preceded by Sir Henry Moore	Commander-in-Chief, The Nore; 1950–1952	Succeeded by Sir Cyril Douglas-Pennant
