= Waldo Cohn =

American biochemist

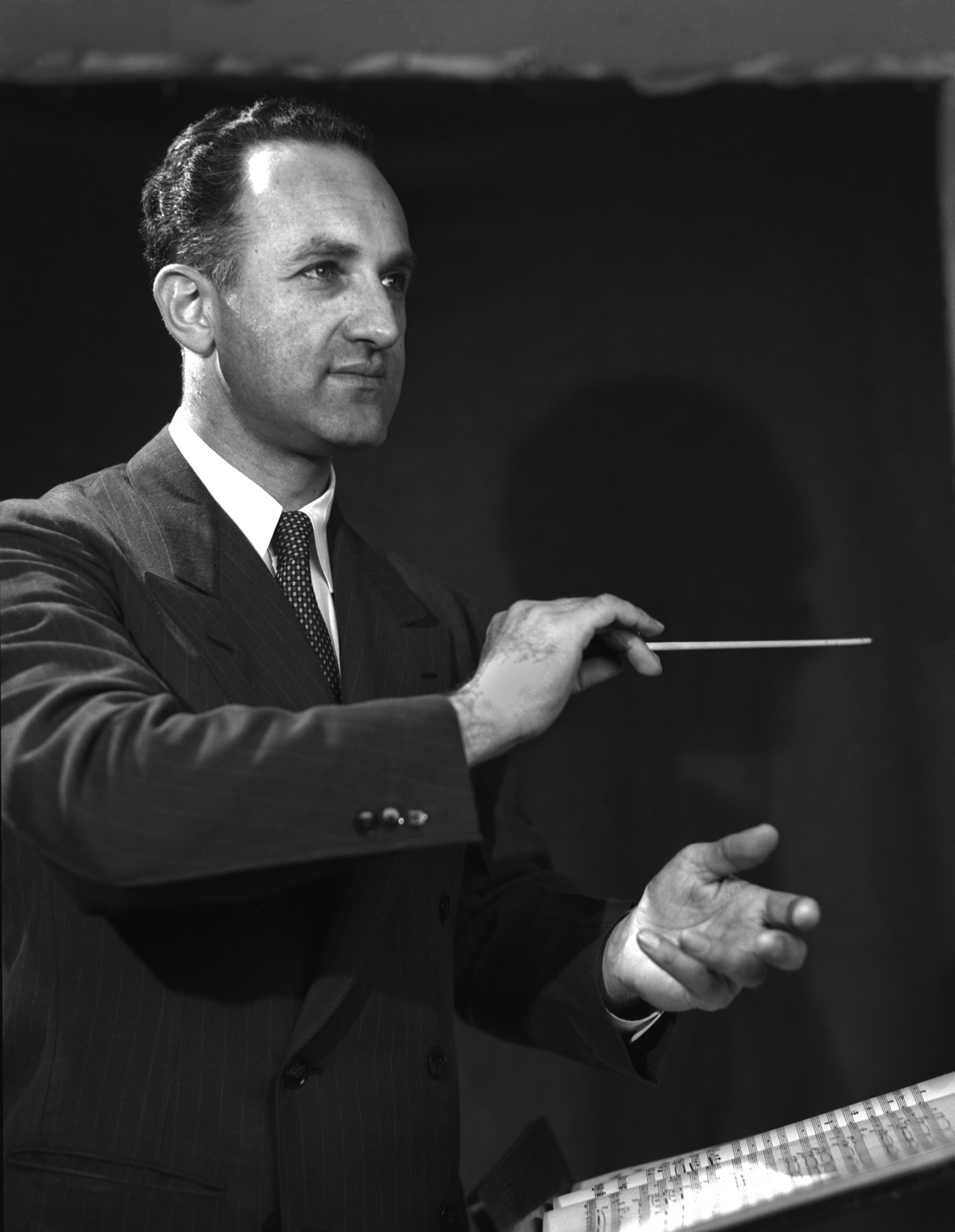
- Cohn in 1947
- Born: 28 June 1910; San Francisco, California, US
- Died: 27 August 1999 (aged 89); Oak Ridge, Tennessee, US
- Education: University of California, Berkeley (Ph.D.)
- Known for: Separation of uranium isotopes for the Manhattan Project; desegregation of schools; founding the Oak Ridge Symphony Orchestra
- Spouse: Charmian Edlin Cohn
- Scientific career
- Fields: Biochemistry
- Institutions: Harvard Medical School, Oak Ridge National Laboratory
- Doctoral advisor: D. M. Greenberg

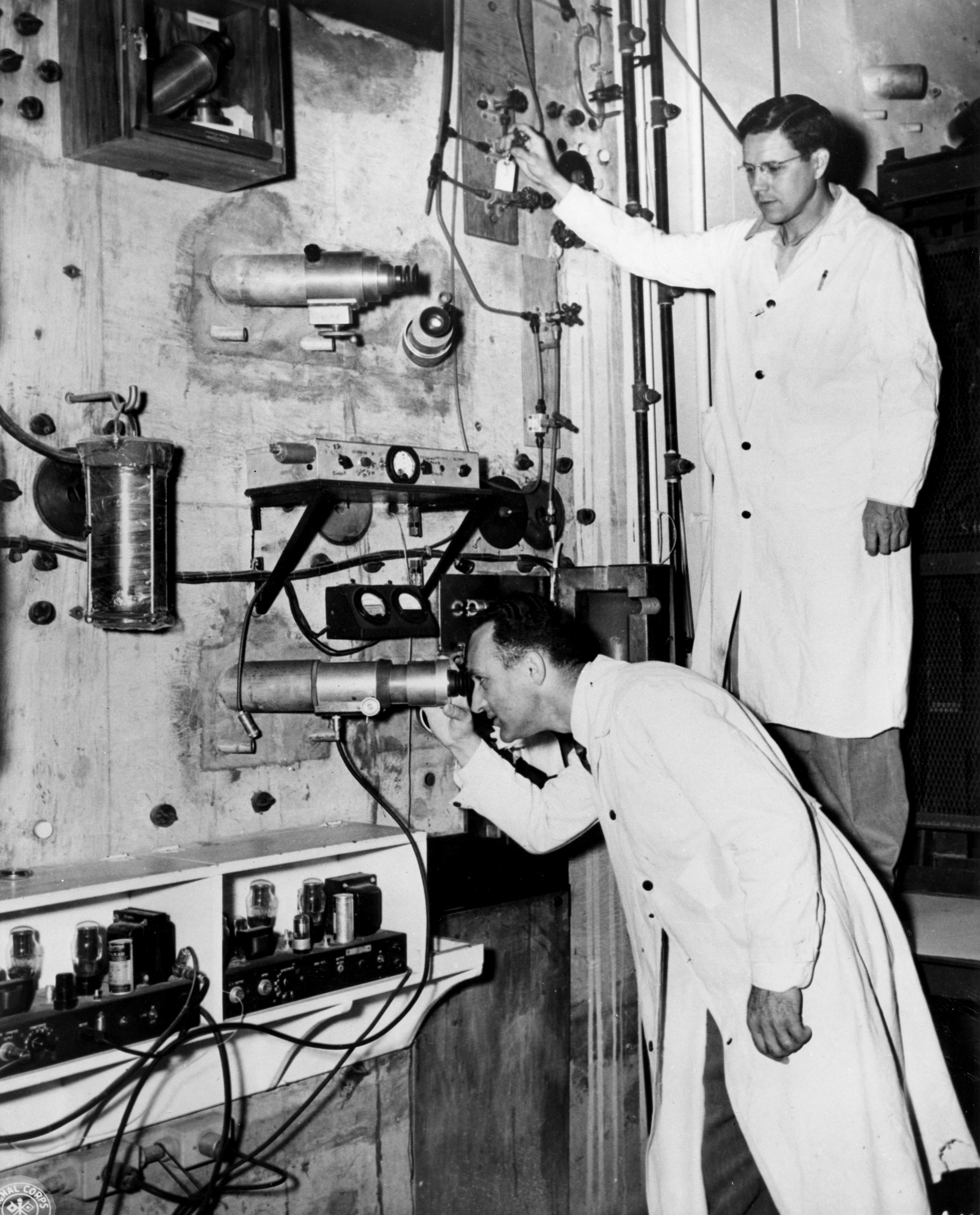
Cohn looking through the periscope of the X-10 Graphite Reactor (1946)

Waldo E. Cohn (1910–1999) was an American biochemist known principally for developing techniques for separation of isotopes necessary for the Manhattan Project.

== Birth and education ==
He was born in San Francisco, California, on 28 June 1910, and studied at the University of California, Berkeley, where he worked under the supervision of D. M. Greenberg, and received his Ph.D. on the basis of a thesis on radioactive phosphorus (^{32}P) produced in the cyclotron and its effects in rats, work later published with Greenberg. In the period 1939–1942 he carried out post-doctoral research in the Harvard Medical School, where he worked on determination of haemoglobin in tissue extracts.

== Career at Oak Ridge ==
From 1942 he participated in the Manhattan Project, working initially at the University of Chicago, but after 1943, and for the rest of his career, at Oak Ridge, Tennessee. There he introduced the use of ion-exchange chromatography for separation of isotopes needed for developing the atomic bomb. On account of the secrecy attached to the Manhattan Project, Cohn published rather little during this period, but that included the start of a long-term interest in nucleic acids.

== Chemical and biochemical nomenclature ==
In his capacity as Director of NAS-NRC Office of Biochemical Nomenclature, located in Oak Ridge, Waldo Cohn worked closely with the IUPAC on chemical and biochemical nomenclature, and maintained a publicly available collection of the Recommendation of the IUPAC-IUB Commission on Biochemical Nomenclature, as noted, for example, in the document on one-letter symbols for amino acids.

== Work outside science ==
=== Music ===
Cohn was an accomplished cellist, and created the Oak Ridge Symphony Orchestra, which held its first concerts in 1944, with early soloists including Isaac Stern, Yaltah Menuhin and Percy Grainger. He played the cello in the orchestra, and also served as its conductor for the first eleven years.

=== Desegregation ===
Cohn was elected chairman of the town advisory council of Oak Ridge in 1953. In that capacity he promoted a resolution urging the federal government to include the town and its schools in an order desegregating military bases that had just been signed by President Dwight D. Eisenhower, and Oak Ridge became one of the first school districts in the southern USA to desegregate its schools. This change was unpopular with many residents, and led to a recall petition. This failed, but Cohn did resign his chairmanship of the Town Council, while remaining a member.

== Death and family ==
Waldo Cohn died in Oak Ridge on 27 August 1999, survived by his widow Charmian Edlin Cohn, who died in 2007, and numerous children and grandchildren. His brother Roy (not to be confused with the notorious lawyer of the same name) worked as a chemist in the paint industry in the San Francisco Bay Area.
