= Mary Mei Loc Wu =

Chinese classical pianist

Mary Mei Loc Wu (Chinese: 吳美樂), also known as Mary Wu, is a Chinese classical pianist, now based in Hong Kong.

== Career ==
At an early age, Mary Wu started full time professional music training at the Yehudi Menuhin School, the Royal College of Music, Banff Centre and the State University of New York at Stony Brook where she completed a Doctorate of Music degree. Her teachers includes Constance Wu, Betty Drown, Peter Norris, Edward Kendall-Taylor, Phyllis Sellick, Vlado Perlemuter, Louis Kentner and Gilbert Kalish. Her prizes and distinctions include first prize at the Royal Overseas League Competition, the Mozart Bicentenary Competition of Asia and the Hong Kong Arts Development Council's Best Artist Award in Music in 2010. In 2003 she was voted as one of Hong Kong's Top Ten Outstanding Young Persons. She is featured as a major artist in the recently published “Hong Kong Music History (CC Liu, Commercial Press 2014).”

Hailed by Ravel's protégé, late Vlado Perlemuter as “one of the most gifted pianists of her generation”, Mary Wu is also praised by Yehudi Menuhin as having “a captivating poetical quality to her playing”. European music review praises Wu for "her extraordinary artistic quality, absolute mastery over the keyboard and magical virtuosity". Mary Wu has performed worldwide, at concert halls such as Southbank Centre, Wigmore Hall in London, Mozarteum concert hall Salzburg, Merkin Hall in New York, Hong Kong City Hall Concert Hall, Hong Kong Cultural Centre, Esplanade – Theatres on the Bay in Singapore, Beijing Concert Hall, Shanghai Concert Hall and Guangzhou (Xing Hai) Concert Hall in China. She has also performed at the Ibiza Festival in Spain, the l'Académie de Ravel in France, the Singapore Arts Festival, the Asian Pianist Masters Series in Singapore, the International Contemporary Music Festival, Manhattan Hong Kong and the Macau Festival.

As a chamber musician she has performed with Yehudi Menuhin, Vlado Perlemuter, Richard Stoltzman, Colin Carr, Tasmin Little, the Maggini Quartet, and the Bauhinia Piano Trio in Hong Kong of which she is a founding member. She has appeared as a soloist with the Calgary Philharmonic Orchestra, Central Philharmonic Orchestra in Beijing, the Polish Baltic F.Chopin Philharmonic in Gdańsk (Polish: Polska Filharmonia Bałtycka im. Fryderyka Chopina w Gdańsku), the Hong Kong Philharmonic Orchestra, the Guangzhou Symphony Orchestra, Hong Kong Sinfonietta, Hong Kong City Chamber Orchestra, Singapore Chinese Orchestra, the Hong Kong Chinese Orchestra, Bangkok Symphony Orchestra and Macau Orchestra.

Notable recordings of Mary Wu included "Fantasia Piano Pieces" by BMG, “ Contemporary Chinese Piano Works” by Paradism and “Ravel Piano Works” under Universal Label, complete Arnold Bax / Ernest Reed violin and piano works with violinist Robert Gibbs on ASV.

Mary Wu serves as a faculty member of the Hong Kong Academy of Performing Arts, and has been a Steinway Artist since 1995. She is the co-president of the Ibiza International Piano Competition since 2019.

== Discography ==
- Fantasia Piano Pieces (BMG, 1993)
- Mary Mei-Loc Wu – Piano Classics (中國文化協會, 1995)
- The Chinese Pianoforte (Paradisum, 2000)
- Live at Wigmore (2000)
- Arnold Bax Violin Sonatas, Ballad, Legend (ASV, 2002)
- W. H. Reed (Dutton, 2003)
- Rachmaninov & Barber Cellosonaten (CFM, 2003)
- Arnold Bax Three Violin Sonatas (ASV, 2002)
- Mary Wu Ravel Piano Works (Universal, 2006)
