= Eva Cox =

Australian writer and sociologist

Eva Cox AO
- Born: Eva Maria Hauser; 21 February 1938 (age 88); Vienna, Austria
- Education: University of New South Wales (1974, B.A. in sociology)
- Occupations: Researcher, women's rights activist
- Known for: Founding member of the Women's Electoral Lobby
- Political party: Labor (until the 1980s)
- Parents: Richard Hauser (father); Ruth Hauser (mother)

Eva Maria Cox AO (née Hauser; born 21 February 1938) is an Austrian-born Australian writer, feminist, sociologist, social commentator and activist. She has been an active advocate for creating a "more civil" society. She was a long-term member of the Women's Electoral Lobby (WEL), and is still pursuing feminist change by putting revaluing social contributions and wellbeing onto political agendas, as well as recognising the common ground between Australia's First Nations and feminist values of the importance of the social.

== Early life ==
Eva Maria Hauser was born into a Jewish family in Vienna in 1938, less than three weeks before the Anschluss (12 March 1938) that left her and her family stateless. The following year, she traveled with her mother Ruth, a final-year medical student, to England, UK; she spent the war—technically as an enemy alien in Surrey. Her father, Richard Hauser, joined the British Army in Palestine, and her grandparents and other relatives sought refuge in Sydney. After the war, her father worked for the United Nations Refugee Association in Rome, Italy, where Cox continued her schooling for two years. In 1948 she joined her mother's extended family in Sydney.

In Sydney she attended Sydney Girls' High School. Two years after arrival, her father began a relationship with the pianist Hephzibah Menuhin, who was at that time married to an Australian grazier, Lindsay Nicholas, and living in western Victoria. Hauser and Menuhin divorced their respective spouses to marry, and Menuhin became Cox's stepmother. Cox attended the University of Sydney from 1956 to 1957, where she met Germaine Greer and Robert Hughes and became associated with the Sydney Push. However, she chose to leave university to travel throughout Europe, where she met John Cox. They married on return to Sydney, and in 1964, they became parents of a daughter, named Rebecca. Rebecca was conceived in Hughenden, Queensland, where Eva Cox had gone to reunite with her husband after they had separated. In 1969 they separated again.

== Career ==
Cox returned to study as a single mother in the early 1970s, graduating with an Honours degree in sociology from the University of New South Wales (UNSW) in 1974, and became a tutor and research consultant in that department. In the 1970s, Cox became a spokeswoman for the WEL and she later helped to found the Women's Economic Think Tank. Cox was director of the New South Wales Council for Social Service (NCOSS) from 1977 to 1981 and she was awarded a Churchill Fellowship in 1980.

Cox was part of the feminist magazine Refractory Girl during the 1980s and became a media spokeswoman, in addition to her activism in anti-war and feminist issues. She also established the first Commonwealth-funded after-school childcare centre, at Glenmore Road Public School in Paddington, New South Wales.

In 1981 and 1982, Cox was an adviser to the Federal Shadow Minister for Social Services, Senator Don Grimes. In 1989, she commenced operating a small private consultancy firm, Distaff Associates, and lectured from 1994 until 2007 at Australia's University of Technology, Sydney (UTS), where she finished as program director of social inquiry.

Cox delivered the 1995 Australian Broadcasting Corporation (ABC) Boyer Lectures presentation, entitled "A Truly Civil Society", which highlighted the importance of social capital. Cox's book Leading Women was published the following year and explored the topic of power in relation to gender. She is a prolific writer and social commentator and her articles can be read in Crikey and The Conversation.

From 2007 to 2015, Cox was a Fellow of the Centre for Policy Development. From 2007 she has been a professorial fellow at Jumbunna Indigenous House of Learning at UTS—Cox works with the latter on evidence bases for social policy. Cox continues as the director of Distaff Associates and is convenor of the Women's Equity Think Tank (WETTANK), a further development of the Women's Economic Think Tank. In March 2014, Cox joined former Australian High Court judge Michael Kirby, among others, to become a patron of Touching Base, a New South Wales-based organisation that provides information, education and support for disabled clients, sex workers and disability service providers. In 2015, following in the footsteps of Jack Mundey who was prominent in the Green Bans movement, she became a patron of the campaign to save the public housing of Millers Point from further development.

== Honours ==
Cox was appointed as an Officer (AO) of the Order of Australia in 1995 for her services to women's welfare and was named Humanist of the Year in 1997 by the Council of Australian Humanist Societies.

In 2011, she received an Australia Post Legends Award and her face appeared on a postage stamp as part of a series of four stamps honouring women who have advanced the cause of gender equality—the other three women were Germaine Greer, Elizabeth Evatt and Anne Summers.

== Personal life ==
It was only after settling in Australia that Cox started to become aware of her Jewish identity and the Jewish community. She is agnostic and a humanist. According to her Twitter profile in March 2014, Cox is based in Sydney, Australia and seeks to "make the societies we live in more civil, with feminism, fairness and equity, with less emphasis on economic materialism".

On her personal website, she refers to herself as a "political junkie" and explains her passion for activism by suggesting, "My father used to embarrass me and adolescent friends by asking what we had done to save the world that day, so maybe it's genetic to feel that if something is wrong, I should try to fix it."

== Bibliography ==
- Cox E. and Goodman J., Bullying at an Australian university: practices and implications, EUR October 2005
- Cox, Eva, In Defence of Social Capital: A reply to Blue Book 8, Arena Magazine 76 June 2005
- Cox E. (2005), A Better Society: Ingredients for Social Sustainability in ed Adams P. and Spender D., The Ideas Book, UQP Brisbane
- Bloch, B. and Cox E. (2005), Jewish Women and Australian in Braham, G. and Mendes P. Jews in Australian Politics, Sussex University Press
- Cox E. (2002), Australia, Making the Lucky Country in Putnam R., Democracies in Flux: The evolution of social capital in contemporary society, OUP NY
- Cox E. (2000), The Light and Dark of Volunteering (2000) in Warburton J. and Oppenheimer M. (Ed), Volunteers and Volunteering, Federation Press, Sydney.
- Cox E. (2000), Diversity and Community: Conflict and Trust? in Vasta E. (Ed), Citizenship, Community and Democracy, Macmillan UK.
- Cox E. and Caldwell C. (2000), Making Policy Social in Winter, I. ed., Social Capital and Public Policy.
