= Richard Hauser =

Austrian-British social scientist (1911 – 1990)

- Born: 1 April 1911; Vienna, Austria
- Died: 6 November 1990 (aged 79)
- Occupation: Sociologist
- Spouse(s): Ruth Kantor Hephzibah Menuhin (m. 1955)
- Children: 2, including Eva Cox

Richard Hauser (1911 – 1990) was an Austrian-British sociologist who had a significant influence on modern social work, primarily through his practical work. Hauser contributed to the founding of centers for group studies and community work worldwide, including in Osnabrück, Essen, and Cologne in Germany.

Richard Hauser was born into a Jewish family in Vienna, on 1 April 1911, the second child of Simon and Hermine (née Stern) Hauser, a Jewish family. His father died in 1934, and his mother was deported to Łódź Ghetto in 1941, where her trail disappeared. Hauser studied sociology and psychology in Vienna, without obtaining a degree.

Hauser married Ruth Kantor, with whom he had a daughter, Eva Cox, who was born in Vienna in 1938, less than three weeks before the Anschluss that left the family stateless. While Ruth and Eva went to England during World War II, Hauser joined the British Army in Palestine; other family members sought refuge in Sydney. After the war, Hauser worked for the United Nations Refugee Association in Rome and was reunited with his family.

In 1948, the Hauser family emigrated to Australia, where Hauser worked for the Government of New South Wales. In 1951, he met American-Australian pianist and writer Hephzibah Menuhin (1920 – 1981), who was then married to Lindsay Nicholas, an Australian grazier. Hauser later divorced Kantor and married Menuhin in 1955. In 1957, the couple moved to London with their daughter, Clara Menuhin-Hauser, where they fostered Michael Alexander Morgan, a boy of mixed Welsh and Nigerian background, who grew up with Clara.

Hauser and Menuhin worked together in many ways. While still in Sydney, they began working with individuals with mental health conditions, and in 1954, established the Psychiatric After Care Club, a support group for patients who were about to be discharged from a mental health hospital. The Psychiatric Rehabilitation Association was established the following year, with Hauser and Menuhin serving as co-founders. Later, they published The Fraternal Society (1963). They also founded the Center for Human Rights and Responsibilities, and the Centre for Group Studies, and later moved to Friends Hall, a Quaker settlement house in Bethnal Green, in the East End of London. They later ran a Human Rights refuge from their house at 16 Ponsonby Place in Pimlico. This also became the base for The Institute for Social Research, which Hauser ran until his death. They worked on small-steps conciliation and attempted to help minorities all over the world.

Hauser and Menuhin were married until Menuhin's death from throat cancer in 1981. Hauser died in London on 6 November 1990.

== Works ==
- Hauser, Richard (1962). The homosexual society. London: The Bodley Head Ltd.
- Hauser, Richard; Menuhin, Hephzibah (1963). The fraternal society. New York: Random House.
- Hauser, Richard; Menuhin, Hephzibah (1971). Die kommende Gesellschaft. Handbuch für die soziale Gruppenarbeit und Gemeinwesenarbeit. Translated by Siegel, Elisabeth. München: Pfeiffer. ISBN 3-7904-0049-1.
