= Éric Heidsieck =

French pianist (born 1936)

Éric Charles Michel Heidsieck (born 21 August 1936) is a French classical pianist.

== Biography ==
Born in Reims on 21 August 1936, Heidsieck gave his first recital at the age of nine and his first orchestral concert a year later. He studied Beethoven with Marcel Ciampi, Alfred Cortot and Wilhelm Kempff.

In 1959 Heidsieck won the Grand Prix du Disque (EMI) for his recording of Mozart's piano concertos Nos. 21 and 24. The following year, he and his wife, Tania Heidsieck, began performing as a piano duo. In 1969, he began performing Beethoven's piano sonatas, which he would proceed to record with EMI Classics on three separate episodes: once between 1970 and 1974, again ten years later, and again in 1997.

Heidsieck has taught for 18 years at the Conservatoire national supérieur de musique et de danse de Lyon. He has given more than 2000 concerts, made around 100 recordings, and gave numerous masterclasses, in France and abroad.
