= Marguerite Wolff =

British pianist

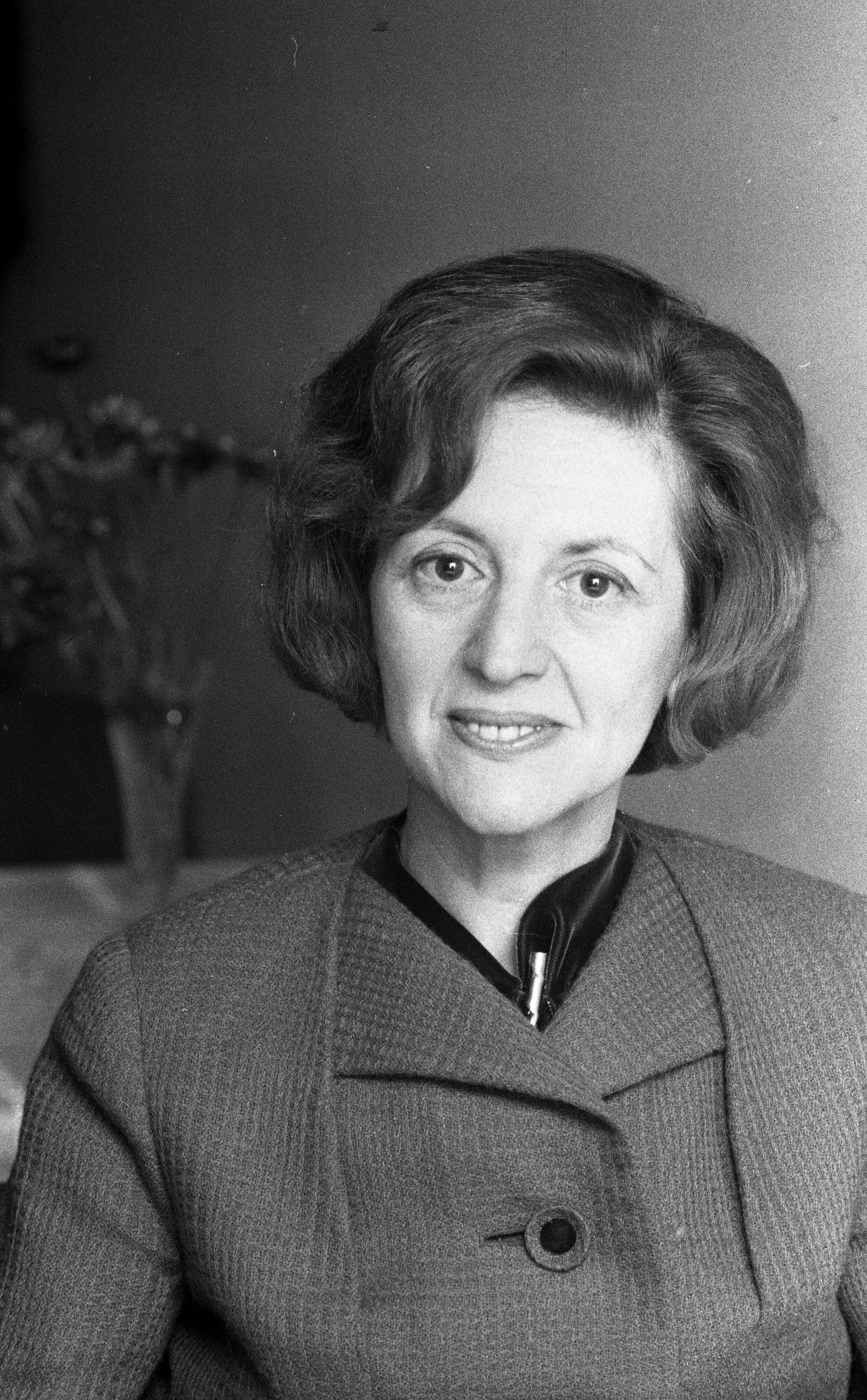
- Marguerite Wolff in 1967.
- Born: 17 February 1919; London, England
- Died: 25 May 2011 (aged 92)
- Children: 2
- Musical career
- Genres: Classical
- Instrument: Piano
- Years active: c. 1934 – ?

Marguerite Agnes Rachel Wolff OBE (17 February 1919 – 25 May 2011) was a British pianist.

== Biography ==
Marguerite Wolff was born in the West Ham area of London on 17 February 1919, the daughter of Walter and Selina (known as Nina) Wolff; her parents were also musical. She studied under Gertrude Azulay and later Solomon Cutner and Louis Kentner.

Her orchestral debut was made when she was just 15, under Sir John Barbirolli. During World War II, she performed more than 1,000 concerts for troops around the UK, under the auspices of the Entertainments National Service Association (ENSA). She was made music professor at Trinity College of Music when only 21.

She gave up her career for marriage and to raise a family (of two daughters) but resumed public performances after being widowed while only 35, in 1964. She subsequently made the premiere recording of Arthur Bliss's Piano Sonata, under the composer's supervision. While touring the US in 1974, she gave the world premiere of his Wedding Suite. Malcolm Williamson's Fourth Piano Concerto was written for her, in 1994.

She was made an Honorary Fellow of Trinity College of Music in 1999 and appeared as a castaway on the BBC Radio programme Desert Island Discs on 15 November 2002, and was made an Officer of the Order of the British Empire (OBE) the same year. She was a member of West London Synagogue.

Wolff died on 25 May 2011 aged 92. She had never remarried.

== Bibliography ==
- Clarson-Leach, Robert (1985). Marguerite Wolff: Adventures of a Concert Pianist.
