= Jean-Marc Luisada =

French pianist (born 1958)

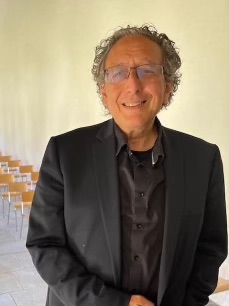
- Luisada in August 2022

Background information
- Born: 3 June 1958 (age 67) Bizerte, Tunisia
- Instrument: Piano

Jean-Marc Luisada (born 3 June 1958) is a French pianist born in Bizerte, Tunisia. He started on the piano at six years old, "the normal age".

== Biography ==
At the age of 16 he began studies at the Conservatoire de Paris under Dominique Merlet and Marcel Ciampi (piano) and Geneviève Joy-Dutilleux (chamber music). He has also studied with Nikita Magaloff and Paul Badura-Skoda.

In 1985, he won fifth prize at the XI International Chopin Piano Competition in Warsaw.

At 29 he had performed in Europe, the United States, and Asia and was known as a performer of "outstanding brilliance".

Luisada signed an exclusive agreement with RCA Red Seal in 1998. Among his recordings are the waltzes and mazurkas of Chopin and the infrequently-heard chamber version of the first Chopin piano concerto, recorded with the Talich Quartet.

Luisada is on the faculty of École Normale de Musique de Paris-Alfred Cortot. Luisada calls himself a human being of the 19th century and often mentions his love for the past and history in his music.
