= Joel Ryce-Menuhin =

- Yaltah Menuhin and Joel Ryce: 1967

Background information
- Born: Joel Taylor Rice; June 11, 1933; Sterling, Illinois, U.S.
- Died: March 31, 1998 (aged 64) Canfield Gardens, Hampstead, England, U.K.
- Genres: Classical
- Occupations: Pianist, psychologist
- Instrument: Piano
- Years active: 1960–1971

Joel Ryce-Menuhin (June 11, 1933 – March 31, 1998) was an American pianist, who later became a Jungian psychologist in private practice.

== Biography ==
Joel Ryce-Menuhin was born as Joel Taylor Rice in Sterling, Illinois to Joseph Kenneth Rice (1901–1998) and Emily Bours Thompson Rice (1898–1982). At a young age he showed considerable talent as a pianist, attending the Juilliard School along with pianist Van Cliburn as a student of Rosina Lhévinne.

While later studying in London with famed pianist Dame Myra Hess in 1959, Joel Rice was introduced to Yaltah Menuhin, sister of violinist Yehudi Menuhin, who had come to play in the Bath Festival. A year later, after their marriage in America on Joel's 27th birthday in 1960, the young pianists were invited to play together at a festival in California. They so enjoyed this first performance, that they subsequently devoted a large portion of their time each season to joint appearances, playing solos, duets and works for two pianos and television appearances in New York, Paris and Geneva.

In 1962, the duo won the Harriet Cohen International Music Award for their London debut, in a program largely devoted to works by Schubert for four hands. In 1966, they performed the Mozart Double Piano Concerto under the baton of Yehudi Menuhin in Gstaad, Switzerland and other venues in Europe. In 1967, Yaltah and Joel recorded the entire duet repertoire of Mozart in America for Everest Records, the first time ever that this was done by one team of artists. During their annual tours in America and Europe, they gave many charity performances, for such organizations as the Swiss Technical Overseas Relief, for mental hospitals, needy infants in Germany, the World Day of Peace at the Lausanne Swiss National Exposition, and for the opening of United Nations Week in London.

== Jungian psychology ==
The Self in Early Childhood by Joel Ryce-Menuhin, 1988.

Physical illness forced Joel to end his musical career in 1971. During the following years, strongly supported by Yaltah, he studied psychology in Switzerland with the founder of Sandplay therapy, Dora M. Kalff, and he became a highly regarded Jungian psychotherapist.

He wrote several music-related books with his wife, Yaltah Menuhin, and wrote and edited several books on psychology (Jung and the Monotheisms, Jungian Sandplay: The Wonderful Therapy, et al.). He formerly edited the Jungian journal, Harvest.

== Personal life ==
Joel Ryce-Menuhin and his wife were married for almost forty years. Following an extended struggle with cancer, Ryce-Menuhin died on March 31, 1998, aged 64, with his wife by his side. Yaltah Menuhin continued to live in their home in Canfield Gardens, Hampstead, England, where she died on June 9, 2001.

== Genealogy ==
Joel was a direct descendant of Edmund Rice, an English immigrant to Massachusetts Bay Colony, as follows:

- Joel Ryce-Menuhin (né Joel Taylor Rice), son of
- Joseph Kenneth Rice (1901 – 1998), son of

- John Samuel Rice (1879 – 1955), son of
- Samuel Gardner Rice (1840 – 1893), son of
- Gardner Rice (1804 – 1878), son of

- Samuel Rice (1772 – 1853), son of
- Nathaniel Rice (1745 – 1777), son of
- Phineas Rice (1724 – 1777), son of

- Perez Rice (1698 – 1782), son of
- Thomas Rice (1654 – 1747), son of
- Thomas Rice (1626 – 1681), son of

- Edmund Rice (1594 – 1663)

== Selected recordings ==
- Menuhin, Yaltah & Joel Ryce. 1965. Music for dual pianists: Petrouchka, by Stravinsky, adapted in 1947 by the composer, --Duet Sonata, by Hindemith—Neue Liebeslieder Walzer, op. 65, complete, by Brahms. SDBR 3130, Everest Records, USA. (Sound recordings)
- Menuhin, Yaltah & Joel Ryce. 1967. The complete works for piano, four hands, Wolfgang Amadeus Mozart No. SDBR 03168/3, Everest Records, USA. (Sound recordings)
- Menuhin, Yaltah & Joel Rice. 1967. Piano Music For Four Hands: Beethoven - 3 Grand Marches In C, E Flat And D Op. 45/ Mendelssohn - Andante And Variations Op. 83A/ Schubert - Fantasie In F Minor Op. 103/ Dvorak - Slavonic Dances Op. 71 No.S 1, 2, 5 & 7. No. 036676, Everest Records, USA (Sound recordings)

== Selected publications ==
- Ryce-Menuhin, J. 1988. The self in early childhood. Free Association Books, London. (ISBN 1853430021)
- Ryce-Menuhin, J. 1992. Jungian sandplay: The wonderful therapy. Routledge Press, London & New York. (ISBN 0415047757)
- Ryce-Menuhin, J. 1992. The performing musician as an analyst: A shift in depth interpretation. Journal of Analytical Psychology 37:49-60.
- Ryce-Menuhin, J. (ed.) 1994. Jung and the monotheisms: Judaism, Christianity, and Islam. Routledge Press, London & New York. (ISBN 0415079624)
- Ryce-Menuhin, J. 1996. Naked and erect: male sexuality and feeling. Chiron Publications, Wilmette, Illinois. (ISBN 1888602007)
