= Míceál O'Rourke =

Irish musician

Míċeál O'Rourke is an Irish pianist who is best known for his recordings of works by John Field.

Born and raised in Dublin, O'Rourke obtained a degree in music from University College, Dublin. Shortly after graduation, he moved to Paris where he has lived ever since. On 12 December 1976 he gave his first public recital in France, playing an all-Chopin programme. He studied piano under Marcel Ciampi, a pupil of Debussy.

O'Rourke has increased the availability of John Field's works considerably through his recordings of all the piano concerti, sonatas, and nocturnes.

In 1994, O'Rourke was awarded the Chopin Medal by the Fryderyk Chopin Society of Warsaw in recognition of his "outstanding Chopin playing".

== Recordings ==
- Chopin - Four ballades, Grandes polonaise brillante, Polonaise-fantasie (1995)
- Debussy - Preludes and Estampes (1992)
- Field - Four Piano Sonatas CHANDOS CD CHAN 8787(1989)
- Field - 16 Piano Pieces (1994)
- Field - Piano Concertos Nos. 1 & 2 (1994)
- Field - Piano Concertos Nos. 3 & 5 (1996)
- Field - Piano Concertos Nos. 4 & 6 (1995)
- Field - Piano Concerto No. 7, Divertissement Nos. 1 & 2, Rondeau, Nocturne No.16, Quintetto (1996)
- Field - The Complete Nocturnes (1988)
- Pinto - Piano Music (2000)
- Schumann - Kreisleriana and Carnaval (1995)
- Field - Nocturnes
