= Evelyn Suart =

English pianist (1881–1950)

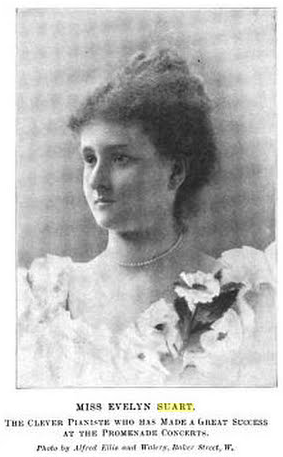
Evelyn Suart, from a 1900 publication.

Evelyn Suart, Lady Harcourt (30 April 1881 – 26 October 1950) was an English pianist.

She was born in 1881 in Sindapore, India, the daughter of Brigadier-General W. H. Suart, and she spent some of her early childhood there. She also lived for periods in Gibraltar and England. Her piano studies were with Storck in Brussels, Raoul Pugno in Paris and Theodor Leschetizky in Vienna. She made six tours and appeared in Vienna, Brussels, London, and with the Berlin and Warsaw Philharmonic Orchestras. In London she often played at the St. James's Hall, under conductors such as Hans Richter and Sir Henry J. Wood, and appeared with violinists of the calibre of Eugène Ysaÿe and Karel Halíř, and other artists.

Her British premieres included the original version of Sergei Rachmaninoff's 1st Piano Concerto (under Wood, 4 October 1900), Max Reger's Violin Sonata No. 5 in F-sharp minor (with Halíř), and pieces by Debussy, Ravel, H. Balfour Gardiner, and most particularly Cyril Scott. She met Scott in 1902 and soon became his champion, frequently playing his works, and introducing him to his publisher, Elkin. Scott dedicated his Scherzo, Op. 25, to her.

She was also a Christian Scientist, and interested in metaphysics. It was through her that Cyril Scott began his lifelong interest in such matters.

Evelyn Suart was a President of the Society of Women Musicians. She died in London in 1950.

== Private life ==
In 1910, Evelyn Suart married Gerald Gould, an Irish-born civil servant with the Foreign Office, who died of typhoid fever in 1916. They had one son (also named Gerald Gould) and two daughters. The elder daughter Diana Gould became a noted ballerina and was the second wife of Yehudi Menuhin. The younger, Griselda, became the second wife of the pianist Louis Kentner.

Evelyn Suart had no time for her children, and had so little understanding of the world that Diana found it hard to imagine how she and her siblings had been conceived. She told Griselda, "Don't think of her as a mother, think of her as a fascinating woman".

In 1920 she married a second time, to a naval officer, Cecil Harcourt. He had a prominent career, rising to the rank of admiral in 1949. He was Head of the Military Government of Hong Kong in 1945–46, and became Second Sea Lord in 1948. He was knighted on 18 December 1945, and Evelyn Suart became Lady Harcourt.

== Sources ==
- Grove's Dictionary of Music and Musicians, 5th ed., 1954
