= Mnuchin =

Mnuchin is a family name, derived from the Jewish female given name Menucha (Menuha, Minucha, Minicha, depending on dialect). Notable people with the surname include:

- Robert Mnuchin (1933–2025), American banker, art dealer and gallerist
- Steven Mnuchin (born 1962), American banker, film producer, political fundraiser, and 77th United States Secretary of the Treasury
- Moshe Menuhin (1893–1982), born Moshe Mnuchin, the great-great-grandson of Shneur Zalman of Liadi, the founder of Chabad Hassidism

== See also ==
- Menuhin
