= Michael Mann (scholar) =

German academic (1919–1977)

Michael Thomas Mann (April 21, 1919 – January 1, 1977) was a German-born musician and professor of German literature.

== Life ==
Born in Munich, Michael Mann was the youngest and sixth child of writer Thomas Mann and Katia Mann. His older siblings were Erika, Klaus, Golo, Monika and Elisabeth. He was of Jewish descent from his mother's side. Due to his being the grandson of Júlia da Silva Bruhns, he was also of Portuguese-Indigenous Brazilian partial descent.

He studied viola and violin in Zürich, Paris and New York City.

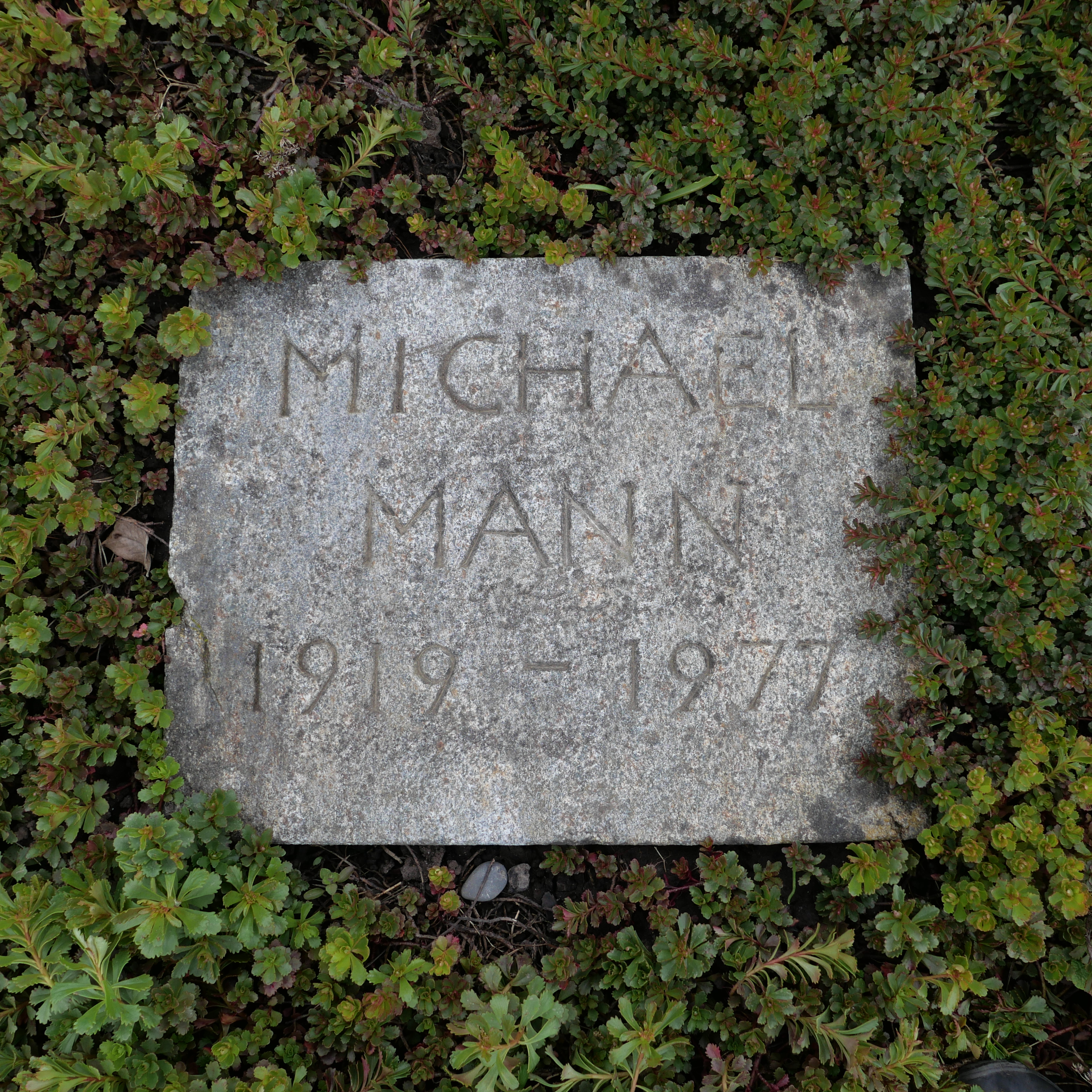
Mann's grave at the cemetery of Kilchberg in the canton of Zurich, where he is buried in the family grave with his parents and his sisters.

He was a viola player in the San Francisco Symphony Orchestra from 1942 to 1947 as well as being a solo viola player. Accompanied by pianist Yaltah Menuhin, he made a concert tour in 1951 and recorded the 1948 Viola Sonata by Ernst Krenek. He was forced to give up professional music due to a neuropathy.

Mann's tour with Menuhin came to an end when he struck her in a fit of rage. He also was physically abusive to his wife Gret.

Mann gained a master's degree in musicology from Duquesne University and a PhD in German literature from Harvard before joining the German faculty at the University of California, Berkeley in 1961.

Mann published a number of books on musicology, short stories, an opera libretto and journal articles. Subjects of his publications included Goethe, Heinrich Heine, Schiller, Schubart and his father's works.

He was married to Gret and they had two sons, Fridolin "Frido" Mann (born 1940) and Toni as well as an adopted daughter, Raju.

He died at age 57 in Orinda, California on 1 January 1977. Reported at the time as a heart attack, his death has also been stated to be the result of an "overdose of alcohol and barbiturates" that was either suicidal or accidental. There is a stone with his name on it on his parents' grave in Kilchberg, Switzerland.

== Discography ==
Deutsche Grammophon. Recorded in Hanover, Germany

- Arthur Honegger – Sonata for viola and piano (1920); Michael Mann (viola); Dika Newlin (piano); recorded 19 March 1952
- Ernst Krenek – Sonata for viola and piano (1948); Michael Mann (viola); Yaltah Menuhin (piano); recorded 9 April 1951
- Darius Milhaud - Quatre Visages (1943); Michael Mann (viola); Dika Newlin (piano); recorded 21 May 1952

Reissue: Johanna Martzy/Michael Mann: Complete Deutsche Grammophon recordings. Deutsche Grammophon/eloquence 484 3299 (2021)

== See also ==
- Dohm–Mann family tree
