= Yehudi Menuhin =

American-British violinist (1916–1999)

The Right Honourable The Lord Menuhin OM KBE
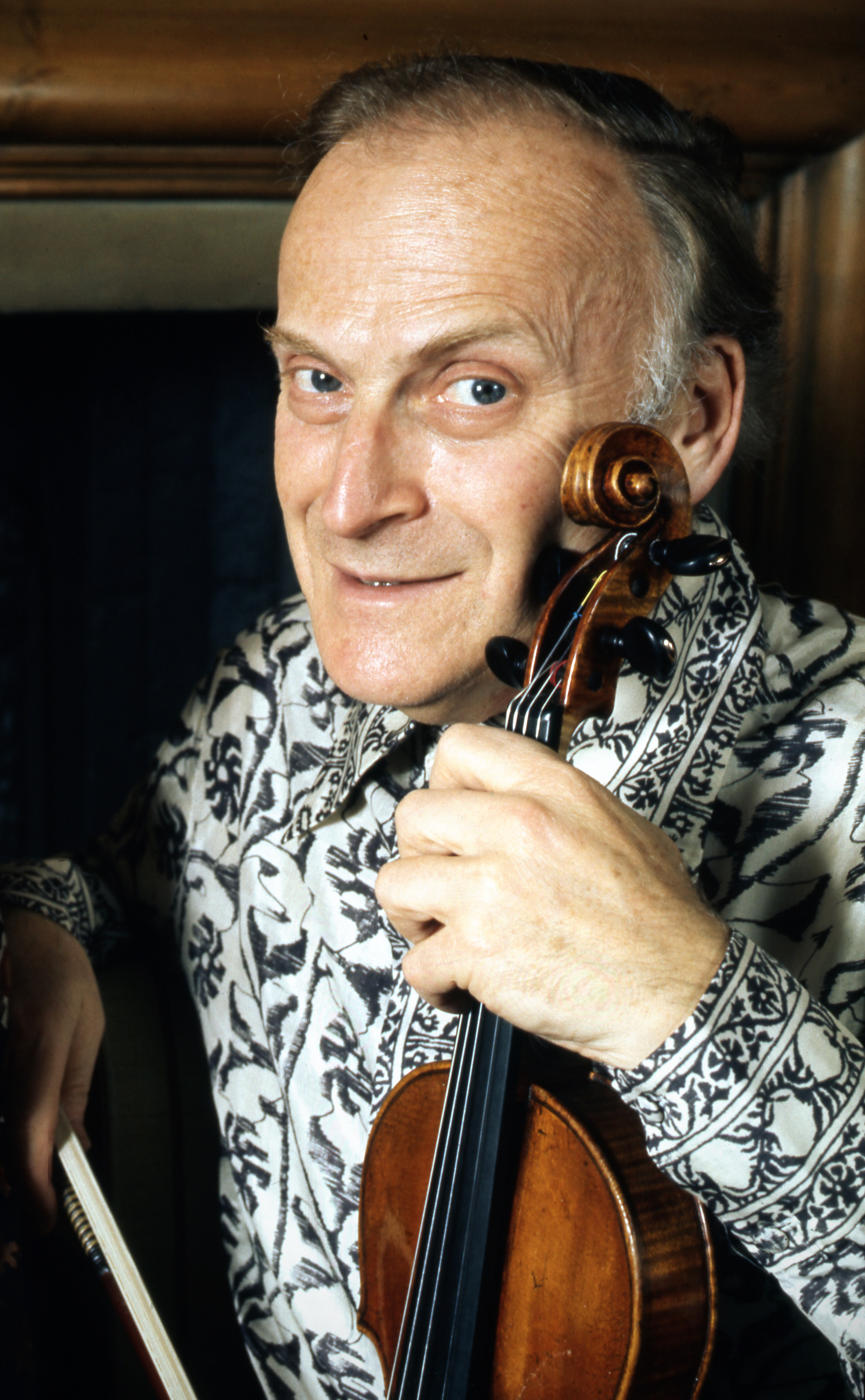
- Menuhin in 1976

Background information
- Born: 22 April 1916; New York City, US
- Died: 12 March 1999 (aged 82) Berlin, Germany
- Genre: Classical music
- Occupations: Violinist, conductor, educator, humanitarian
- Instruments: Violin, viola, piano
- Years active: 1926–1999
- Labels: RCA Victor, EMI Classics, Deutsche Grammophon
- Website: menuhin.org

Yehudi Menuhin, Baron Menuhin (22 April 1916 – 12 March 1999), was an American-born British and Swiss violinist and conductor who spent most of his performing career in Britain. He is widely considered one of the greatest violinists of the 20th century.

== Early life and career ==
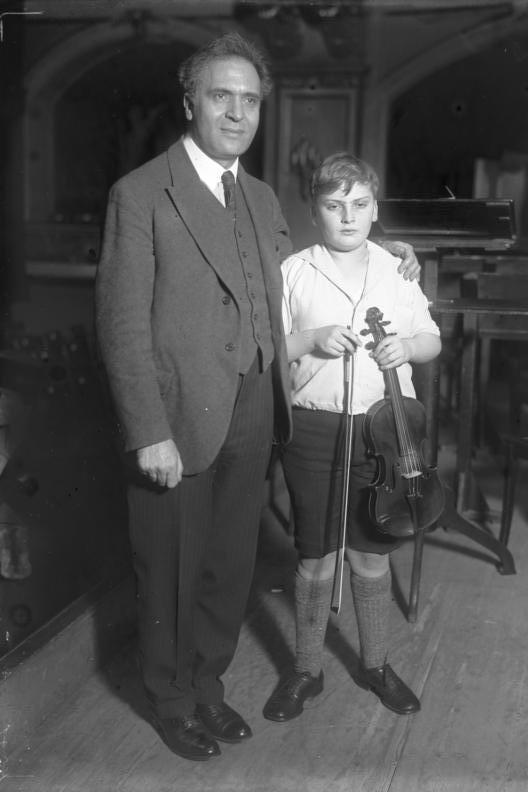
Menuhin with Bruno Walter (1929)

Yehudi Menuhin was born in New York City to Moshe Menuhin, a Lithuanian Jew from Gomel in modern Belarus, and Marutha, a Crimean Karaite. Through his father Moshe, he was descended from a rabbinical dynasty. Moshe and Marutha (née Sher) met in the Mutasarrifate of Jerusalem (part of historic Palestine under the Ottoman Empire) before marrying in New York in 1914. In late 1919, the pair became American citizens and changed the family name from Mnuchin to Menuhin. Menuhin's sisters were concert pianist and human rights activist Hephzibah, and pianist, painter and poet Yaltah.

Menuhin's first violin instruction was at the age of four by Sigmund Anker (1891–1958) an Austrian violin teacher who teaches advanced demanding technique from very young age for children, but his teaching lasted for two years for Menuhin. His parents had wanted Louis Persinger to teach him, and Persinger agreed. Menuhin took lessons for a while from Persinger at his Hyde Street studio. He made his first public solo appearance in November 1921, at a pupil's concert. On 29 February 1924, he formally debuted in a solo performance for a matinee concert given by the San Francisco Symphony at the Oakland Auditorium under the direction of Alfred Hertz, with Persinger playing the piano accompaniment. This was followed by a recital at the Scottish Rite Hall. His reputation preceded him to New York for his debut there on 17 March 1926, at the Manhattan Opera House. Persinger then agreed to teach him and accompanied him on the piano for his first few solo recordings in 1928 and 1929.

Julia Boyd records:

On 12 April 1929, it [the Semperoper] cancelled its advertised programme to make way for a performance by the twelve-year-old Yehudi Menuhin. That night he played the Bach, Beethoven and Brahms violin concertos to an ecstatic audience ... The week before, Yehudi had played in Berlin with the Philharmonic under Bruno Walter to an equally rapturous response.

A newspaper critic said of his Berlin performance: "There steps a fat little blond boy on the podium, and wins at once all hearts as in an irresistibly ludicrous way, like a penguin, he alternately places one foot down, then the other. But wait: you will stop laughing when he puts his bow to the violin to play Bach's violin concerto in E major no.2."

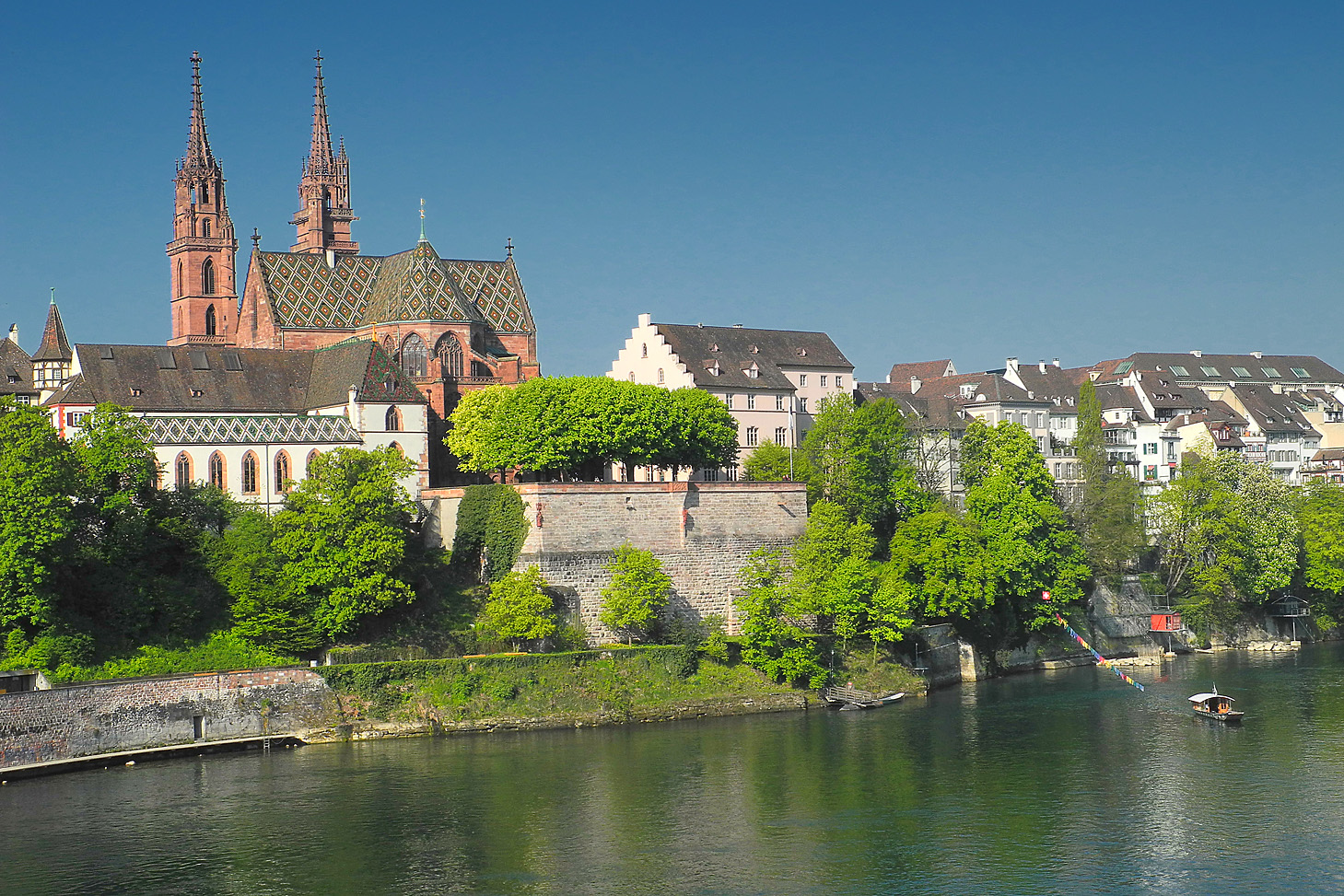
The city of Basel: place of study under the guidance of Adolf Busch

When the Menuhins moved to Paris, Persinger suggested Menuhin go to Persinger's old teacher, Belgian virtuoso and pedagogue Eugène Ysaÿe. Menuhin did have one lesson with Ysaÿe, but he disliked Ysaÿe's teaching method and his advanced age. Instead, he went to Romanian composer and violinist George Enescu, under whose tutelage he made recordings with several piano accompanists, including his sister Hephzibah. He was also a student of Adolf Busch in Basel. He stayed in the Swiss city for a bit more than a year, where he started to take lessons in German and Italian as well.

According to Henry A. Murray, Menuhin wrote:

Actually, I was gazing in my usual state of being half absent in my own world and half in the present. I have usually been able to "retire" in this way. I was also thinking that my life was tied up with the instrument and would I do it justice?

— Yehudi Menuhin, personal communication, 31 October 1993

His first concerto recording was made in 1931, Bruch's G minor, under Sir Landon Ronald in London, the labels calling him "Master Yehudi Menuhin". In 1932 he recorded Edward Elgar's Violin Concerto in B minor for His Master's Voice in London, with the composer himself conducting; in 1934, uncut, Paganini's D major Concerto with Emile Sauret's cadenza in Paris under Pierre Monteux. Between 1934 and 1936, he made the first integral recording of Johann Sebastian Bach's sonatas and partitas for solo violin, although his Sonata No. 2, in A minor, was not released until all six were transferred to CD.

Menuhin performing the Air from Johann Sebastian Bach's third orchestral suite with an orchestra conducted by Antal Doráti

His interest in the music of Béla Bartók prompted him to commission a work from him – the Sonata for Solo Violin, which, completed in 1943 and first performed by Menuhin in New York in 1944, was the composer's penultimate work.

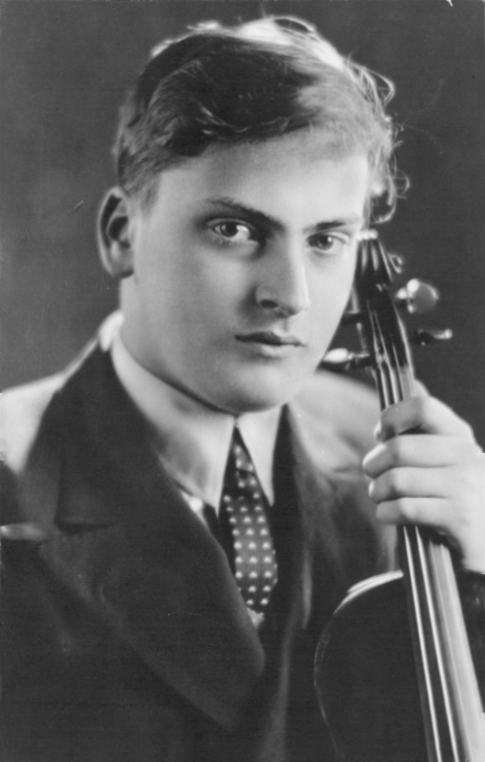
Menuhin in 1937

== World War II musician ==
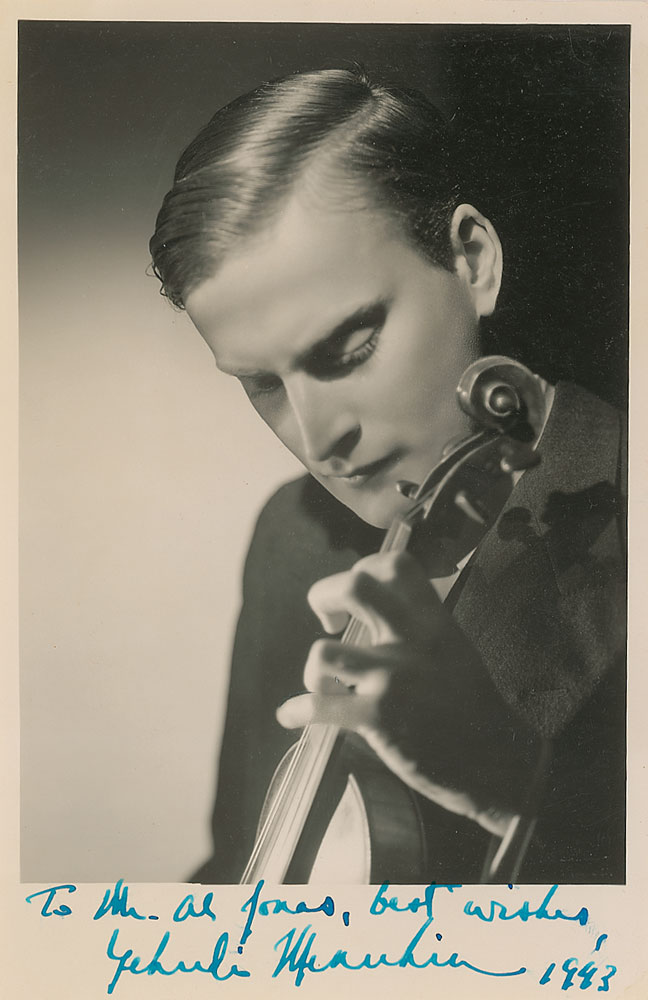
Menuhin in 1943

He performed for Allied soldiers during World War II and, accompanied on the piano by English composer Benjamin Britten, for the surviving inmates of a number of concentration camps in June and July 1945 after their liberation in April of the same year, most famously Bergen-Belsen. He returned to Germany in 1947 to play concerto concerts with the Berlin Philharmonic under Wilhelm Furtwängler as an act of reconciliation, the first Jewish musician to do so in the wake of the Holocaust, saying to Jewish critics that he wanted to rehabilitate Germany's music and spirit.

== World interactions ==
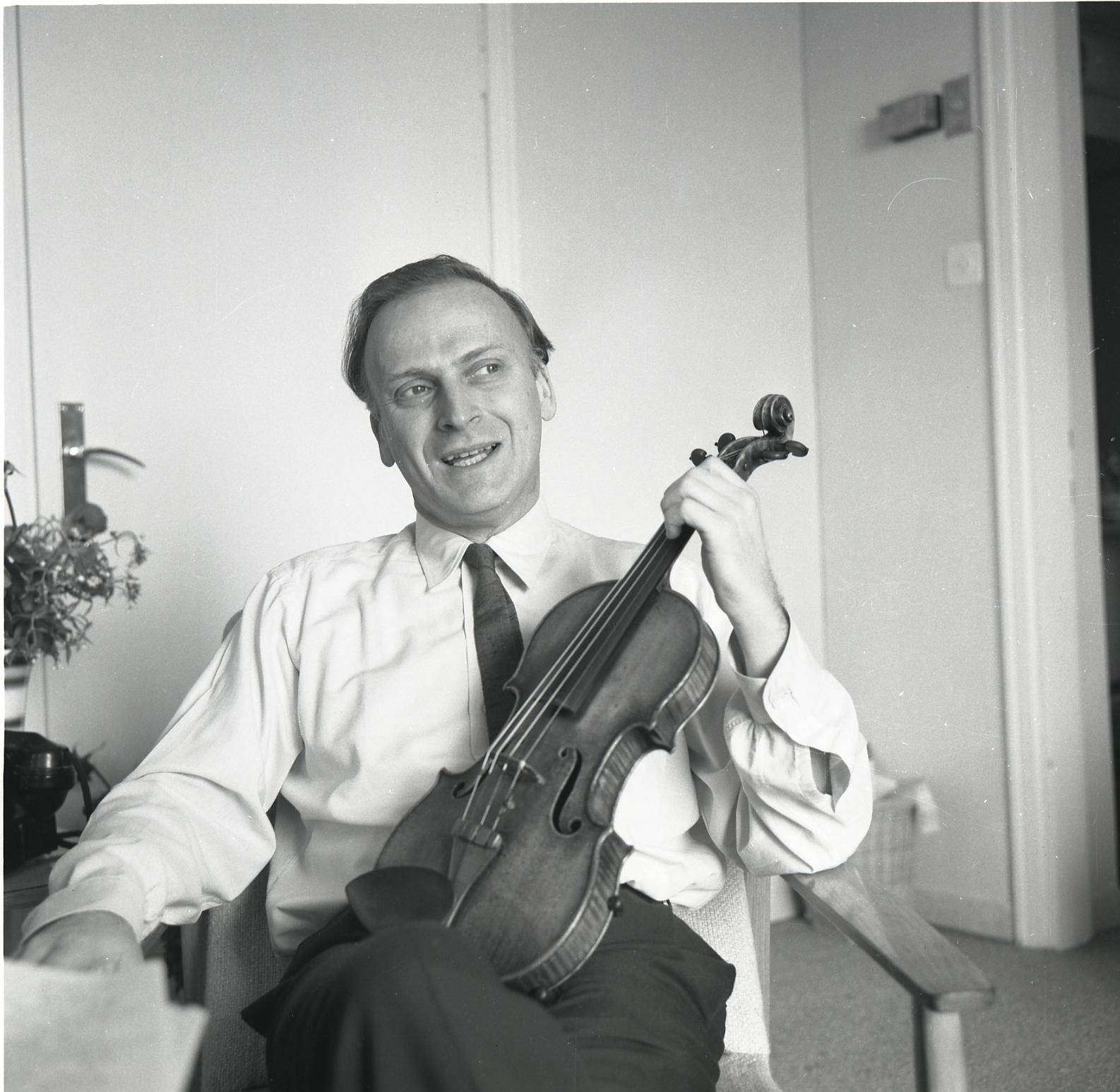
Menuhin during a 1963 visit to Israel. Boris Carmi, Meitar collection, National Library of Israel

Menuhin credited German philosopher Constantin Brunner with providing him with "a theoretical framework within which I could fit the events and experiences of life".

He and Louis Kentner (brother-in-law of his wife, Diana) gave the first performance of William Walton's Violin Sonata, in Zürich on 30 September 1949.

Following his role as a member of the awards jury at the 1955 Queen Elisabeth Music Competition, Menuhin secured a Rockefeller Foundation grant for the financially strapped Grand Prize winner at the event, Argentine violinist Alberto Lysy. Menuhin made Lysy his only personal student, and the two toured extensively throughout the concert halls of Europe. The young protégé later established the International Menuhin Music Academy (IMMA) in Gstaad, in his honor.

Menuhin made several recordings with the German conductor Wilhelm Furtwängler, who had been criticized for conducting in Germany during the Nazi era. Menuhin defended Furtwängler, noting that the conductor had helped a number of Jewish musicians to flee Nazi Germany.

Menuhin performing Niccolò Paganini's Caprice No. 24, accompanied by Adolph Baller

In 1957, he founded the Menuhin Festival Gstaad in Gstaad, Switzerland. In 1962, he established the Yehudi Menuhin School in Stoke d'Abernon, Surrey. He also established the music program at The Nueva School in Hillsborough, California, sometime around then. In 1965 he received an honorary knighthood from the British monarchy. In the same year, Australian composer Malcolm Williamson wrote a violin concerto for Menuhin. He performed the concerto many times and recorded it at its premiere at the Bath Festival in 1965. Originally known as the Bath Assembly, the festival was first directed by the impresario Ian Hunter in 1948. After the first year the city tried to run the festival itself, but in 1955 asked Hunter back. In 1959 Hunter invited Menuhin to become artistic director of the festival. Menuhin accepted, and retained the post until 1968.

Menuhin also had a long association and deep friendship with Ravi Shankar, beginning in 1952, leading to their joint performance in 1966 at the Bath Festival and the recording of their Grammy Award-winning album West Meets East (1967). During this time, he commissioned composer Alan Hovhaness to write a concerto for violin, sitar, and orchestra to be performed by himself and Shankar. The resulting work, entitled Shambala (c. 1970), with a fully composed violin part and space for improvisation from the sitarist, is the earliest known work for sitar with western symphony orchestra, predating Shankar's own sitar concertos, but Menuhin and Shankar never recorded it.

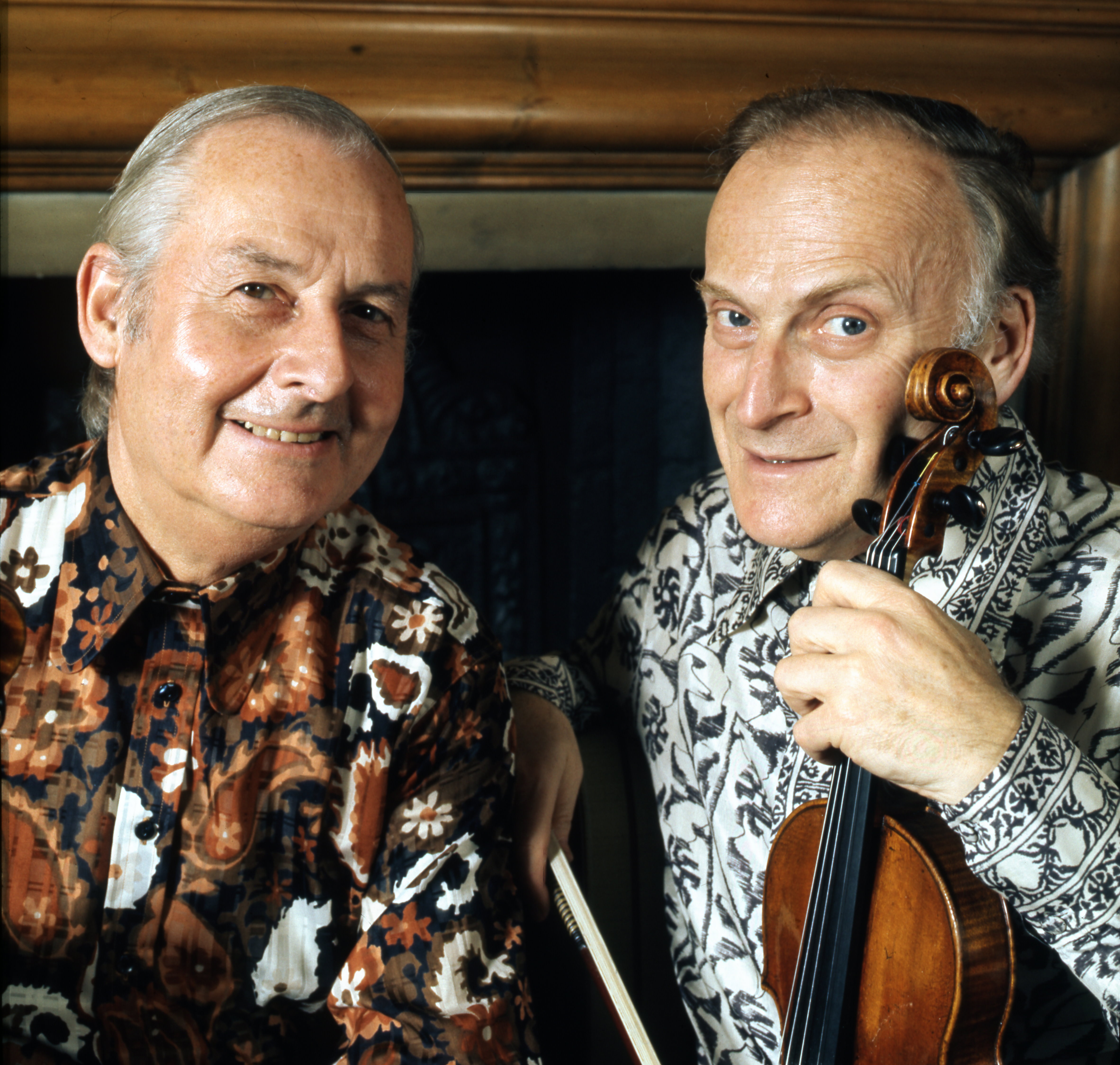
Stéphane Grappelli (left) with Menuhin in 1976

Menuhin also worked with famous jazz violinist Stéphane Grappelli in the 1970s on Jalousie, an album of 1930s classics led by duetting violins backed by the Alan Claire Trio.

In 1975, in his role as president of the International Music Council, he declared 1 October as International Music Day. The first International Music Day, organised by the International Music Council, was held that same year, in accordance with the resolution taken at the 15th IMC General Assembly in Lausanne in 1973.

In 1977, Menuhin and Ian Stoutzker founded the charity Live Music Now, the largest outreach music project in the UK. Live Music Now pays and trains professional musicians to work in the community, bringing the experience to those who rarely get an opportunity to hear or see live music performance. At the Edinburgh Festival, Menuhin premiered Priaulx Rainier's violin concerto Due Canti e Finale, which he had commissioned Rainier to write. He also commissioned her last work, Wildlife Celebration, which he performed in aid of Gerald Durrell's Wildlife Conservation Trust.

In 1978, Menuhin played with the Québécois fiddler Jean Carignan for a unique presentation of the Petit concerto pour Carignan et orchestre composed by André Gagnon. This concert appeared on his TV show The Music of Man broadcast by the CBC.

In 1983, Menuhin and Robert Masters founded the Yehudi Menuhin International Competition for Young Violinists, today one of the world's leading forums for young talent. Many of its prizewinners have gone on to become prominent violinists, including Tasmin Little, Nikolaj Znaider, Ilya Gringolts, Julia Fischer, Daishin Kashimoto and Ray Chen.

In the 1980s, Menuhin wrote and oversaw the creation of a "Music Guides" series of books; each covered a musical instrument, with one on the human voice. Menuhin wrote some, while others were edited by different authors.

In 1991, Menuhin was awarded the Wolf Prize by the Israeli Government. In the Israeli Knesset he gave an acceptance speech in which he criticised Israel's continued occupation of the West Bank:

This wasteful governing by fear, by contempt for the basic dignities of life, this steady asphyxiation of a dependent people, should be the very last means to be adopted by those who themselves know too well the awful significance, the unforgettable suffering of such an existence. It is unworthy of my great people, the Jews, who have striven to abide by a code of moral rectitude for some 5,000 years, who can create and achieve a society for themselves such as we see around us but can yet deny the sharing of its great qualities and benefits to those dwelling amongst them.

== Later career ==
Menuhin performing the first movement of Ludwig van Beethoven's Violin Sonata No. 1, accompanied by Adolph Baller

Menuhin regularly returned to the San Francisco Bay Area, sometimes performing with the San Francisco Symphony Orchestra. One of the more memorable later performances was of Edward Elgar's Violin Concerto, which Menuhin had recorded with the composer in 1932.

On 22 April 1978, along with Stéphane Grappelli, Yehudi played "Pick Yourself Up", taken from the Menuhin & Grappelli Play Berlin, Kern, Porter and Rodgers & Hart album, as the interval act at the 23rd Eurovision Song Contest for TF1. The performance came direct from the studios of TF1 and not that of the venue (Palais des Congrès), where the contest was being held.

Menuhin hosted the PBS telecast of the gala opening concert of the San Francisco Symphony from Davies Symphony Hall in September 1980.

His recording contract with EMI lasted almost 70 years and is the longest in the history of the music industry. He made his first recording at the age of 13 in November 1929, and his last in 1999, when he was nearly 83 years old. He recorded more than 300 works for EMI, both as a violinist and as a conductor. In 2009, EMI released a 51-CD retrospective of Menuhin's recording career, titled Yehudi Menuhin: The Great EMI Recordings. In 2016, the Menuhin centenary year, Warner Classics (formerly EMI Classics) issued a milestone collection of 80 CDs titled The Menuhin Century, curated by his long-time friend and protégé Bruno Monsaingeon, who selected the recordings and sourced rare archival materials to tell Menuhin's story.

From 1984 until his death in 1999, he was the first guest conductor of Sinfonia Varsovia. with which he performed more than 300 times (nearly half of which were between 1996 and 1998). He said that "working with no other orchestra gave me as much satisfaction as my work, as soloist and conductor, with the Sinfonia Varsovia Orchestra." In his Unfinished Journey: Twenty Years Later, he added: "It was a true inspiration to spend as much time with them [Sinfonia Varsovia] as possible, to enjoy the deep satisfaction I derive from our music-making together." In 1991, he became Principal Guest Conductor of the English Symphony Orchestra, a position he also held until his death.

In 1990, Menuhin was the first conductor for the Asian Youth Orchestra, which toured around Asia, including Japan, Taiwan, Singapore and Hong Kong with Julian Lloyd Webber and a group of young talented musicians from all over Asia.

== Personal life ==
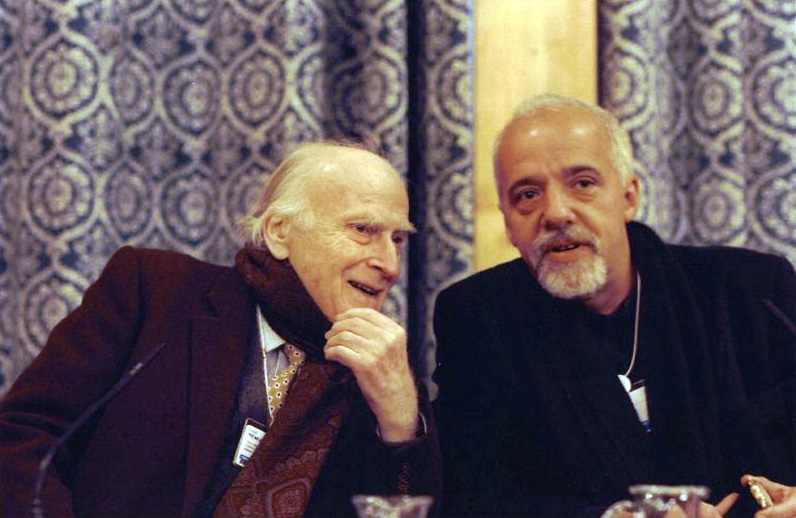
Menuhin (left) and author Paulo Coelho in 1999 at the World Economic Forum in Davos, Switzerland

Menuhin was married twice, first to Nola Nicholas, daughter of an Australian industrialist and sister of Hephzibah Menuhin's first husband Lindsay Nicholas. They had two children: Krov and Zamira (who married pianist Fou Ts'ong). Following their 1947 divorce, Menuhin married the British ballerina and actress Diana Gould, whose mother was the pianist Evelyn Suart and stepfather was Admiral Sir Cecil Harcourt. The couple had two sons, Gerard, notable as a Holocaust denier and far-right activist, and Jeremy, a pianist. A third child died shortly after birth. In the 1960s and 1970s, they lived in Highgate at 2 The Grove, a house later owned by musician Sting.

The name Yehudi means "Jew" in Hebrew. In an interview republished in October 2004, Menuhin recounted to New Internationalist magazine the story of his name:

Obliged to find an apartment of their own, my parents searched the neighbourhood and chose one within walking distance of the park. Showing them out after they had viewed it, the landlady said: "And you'll be glad to know I don't take Jews." Her mistake made clear to her, the antisemitic landlady was renounced, and another apartment found. But her blunder left its mark. Back on the street my mother made a vow. Her unborn baby would have a label proclaiming his race to the world. He would be called "The Jew".

Menuhin became an honorary citizen of Switzerland, and then also of the United Kingdom, in 1970 and 1985, respectively.

Along with Albert Einstein, Menuhin was one of the sponsors of the Peoples' World Convention (PWC), also known as Peoples' World Constituent Assembly (PWCA), which took place in 1950–51 at Palais Electoral, Geneva, Switzerland.

Menuhin was a pescetarian.

=== Interest in yoga ===
In 1953, Life published photos of him in various esoteric yoga positions. In 1952, Menuhin was in India, where Prime Minister Jawaharlal Nehru introduced him to an influential yogi B. K. S. Iyengar, who was largely unknown outside the country. Menuhin arranged for Iyengar to teach abroad in London, Switzerland, Paris, and elsewhere. He became one of the first prominent yoga masters teaching in the West.

Menuhin also took lessons from Indra Devi, who opened the first yoga studio in the U.S. in Los Angeles in 1948. Both Devi and Iyengar were students of Krishnamacharya, a famous yoga master in India.

=== Death and legacy ===
Menuhin died in Martin Luther Hospital in Berlin, Germany, from complications of bronchitis on 12 March 1999, aged 82. Soon after his death, the Royal Academy of Music acquired the Yehudi Menuhin Archive, which includes sheet music marked up for performance, correspondence, news articles and photographs relating to Menuhin, autograph musical manuscripts, and several portraits of Paganini.

== Violins ==
Menuhin played a number of famous violins, arguably the most renowned of which is the Lord Wilton Guarnerius 1742. Others included the Giovanni Bussetto 1680, Giovanni Grancino 1695, Guarneri filius Andrea 1703, Soil Stradivarius, Prince Khevenhüller 1733 Stradivari, and Guarneri del Gesù 1739.

In his autobiography Unfinished Journey, Menuhin wrote: "A great violin is alive; its very shape embodies its maker's intentions, and its wood stores the history, or the soul, of its successive owners. I never play without feeling that I have released or, alas, violated spirits."

== Awards and honours ==
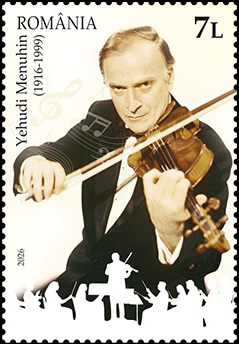
Menuhin on a 2026 stamp of Romania

- Decorated with the Cross of Lorraine in 1943. (Reported by the BBC Home Service in the Radio Introduction to the broadcast with the BBC Symphony Orchestra of the D Major Concerto by Brahms on 5 April 1943. Quote "Yehudi Menuhin has come to this country to give his services to war charities and listeners will like to know that yesterday he was decorated with the Cross of Lorraine for his services to the Fighting French.")
- Appointed to the Order of the British Empire (KBE) in 1965. At the time of his appointment, he was an American citizen. As a result, his knighthood was honorary and he was not entitled to use the style 'Sir'. Later, he became a British citizen and the knighthood became substantive. In 1993, he was ennobled taking the style The Right Honourable The Lord Menuhin, OM, KBE (see below).
- Freedom of the City (Edinburgh, Scotland, 1965).
- The Jawaharlal Nehru Award for International Understanding (1968).
- Became President of the International Music Council (1969–1975)
- Became President of Trinity College of Music (now Trinity Laban Conservatoire of Music and Dance), 1970.
- The Léonie Sonning Music Prize (Denmark, 1972).
- Nominated as president of the Elgar Society (1983).
- The Ernst von Siemens Music Prize (1984).
- The Kennedy Center Honors (1986).
- Appointed as a member of the Order of Merit (1987).
- His recording of Edward Elgar's Cello Concerto in E minor with Julian Lloyd Webber won the 1987 BRIT Award for Best British Classical Recording (BBC Music Magazine named this recording "the finest version ever recorded").
- The Glenn Gould Prize (1990), in recognition of his lifetime of contributions.
- Wolf Prize in Arts (1991).
- Ambassador of Goodwill (UNESCO, 1992).
- On 19 July 1993, Menuhin was made a life peer, as Baron Menuhin, of Stoke d'Abernon in the County of Surrey.
- Sangeet Natak Akademi Fellowship the highest honour conferred by Sangeet Natak Akademi, India's National Academy for Music, Dance and Drama (1994).
- The Konex Decoration (Konex Foundation, Argentina, 1994).
- The Otto Hahn Peace Medal in Gold of the United Nations Association of Germany (DGVN) in Berlin (1997).
- Honorary Doctorates from 20 universities, including Oxford, Cambridge, St Andrews, Vrije Universiteit Brussel and the University of Bath (1969).
- The room in which concerts and performances are held at the European Parliament in Brussels is named the "Yehudi Menuhin Space".
- Menuhin was honored as a "Freeman" of the cities of Edinburgh, Bath, Reims and Warsaw.
- He held the Gold Medals of the cities of Paris, New York and Jerusalem.
- Honorary degree from Kalamazoo College.
- Elected an Honorary Fellow of Fitzwilliam College in 1991.
- He received the 1997 Prince of Asturias Award in the Concord category along with Russian cellist Mstislav Rostropovich.
- In 1997, he received the Grand Cross 1st class of the Order of Merit of the Federal Republic of Germany.
- On 15 May 1998, Menuhin received the Grand Cross of the Order of Saint James of the Sword (Portugal).

Coat of arms of Yehudi Menuhin

Crest
Out of an eastern crown Or inscribed on either side with a crotchet rest a sharp semi-quaver a flat and semi-quaver rest Sable a pair of cubit arms Proper supporting a terrestrial globe the land Vert fimbriated Or the sea Azure.
Escutcheon
Azure four bendlets between as many violin bridges Gold.
Supporters
On either side a representation of a firebird à la Benois wings elevated and addorsed Gules beaked and membered with wings tipped Or the tail Bleu Celeste that to the dexter Gorged with a chain Or pendent therefrom a hurt fimbriated and charged with a menorah Or the candles Argent enflamed Proper that to the sinister gorged with a like chain pendent therefore a bezant charged with a representation of the gypsy flag mon Proper the compartment a grassy mound with bluebells and blue poppies growing therefrom all Proper with at the centre thereof a plough Gold.

== Cultural references ==
- The catchphrase "Who's Yehoodi?" popular in the 1930s and 1940s was inspired by Menuhin's guest appearance on a radio show, where Jerry Colonna turned "Yehoodi" into a widely recognized slang term for a mysteriously absent person. It eventually lost all of its original connection with Menuhin.
- Menuhin was also "meant" to appear on The 1971 Morecambe and Wise Christmas Show but could not do so as he was "opening at the Argyle Theatre, Birkenhead in Old King Cole". He was replaced by Eric Morecambe in the famous "Grieg's Piano Concerto by Grieg" sketch featuring the conductor André Previn; he was also invited to appear on their 1973 Christmas Show to play his "banjo" as they said playing his violin would not be any good; he ruefully said that "I can't help you".
- A picture of Menuhin as a child is sometimes used as part of a Thematic Apperception Test.

== Films ==
- 1943 – Menuhin was a featured performer in the 1943 film, Stage Door Canteen. Introduced only as "Mr. Menuhin", he performed two violin solos, "Ave Maria" and "Flight of the Bumble Bee" for an audience of servicemen, volunteer hostesses and celebrities from stage and screen.
- 1946 – Menuhin supplied the violin solos in the film The Magic Bow.
- Concert Magic (1948) - violinist
- Sabine und die 100 Männer (1960)
- Festival in Adelaide (1962)
- 1979 – The Music of Man (television series)
- The Mind of Music]

== Sources ==
- Rolfe, Lionel Menuhin (2014). The Menuhins: A Family Odyssey. Los Angeles: Createspace. ISBN 978-1-4414-9399-6.
- Menuhin, Diana (1984). Fiddler's Moll. Life With Yehudi. New York: St Martin's Press. ISBN 0-312-28819-0.
- Menuhin, Yehudi (1977). Unfinished Journey. New York: Knopf. ISBN 0-394-41051-3.
- Menuhin, Yehudi (1997). Unfinished Journey: Twenty Years Later. New York: Fromm Intl. ISBN 0-88064-179-7.
- L. Subramaniam, Y. Menuhin; Directed by Jean Henri Meunier (1999). Violin From the Heart (DVD).
- Bailey, Philip (2008). Yehudiana – Reliving the Menuhin Odyssey|Book One. Australia: Fountaindale Press. ISBN 978-0-9804499-0-7.
- Bailey, Philip (2010). Yehudiana – Reliving the Menuhin Odyssey Book Two. Australia: Fountaindale Press. ISBN 978-0-9804499-1-4.
- Burton, Humphrey (2000). Yehudi Menuhin: a life. Northeastern. ISBN 978-1-55553-465-3.
