= Jeremy Menuhin =

Composer and pianist

Jeremy Louis Eugene Menuhin (born 2 November 1951) is a composer and pianist and the son of violinist Yehudi Menuhin.

== Early life ==
Menuhin was born in San Francisco, California, the fourth son of his father Yehudi Menuhin and the second of his mother Diana Gould Menuhin. He attended Eton College near Windsor, Berkshire. He describes his childhood as economically privileged but emotionally "grotesque", his father as "cold and detached", and his mother as "domineering and volatile".

Unlike father Yehudi, who was pushed towards music at a young age by his own mother (Jeremy's grandmother), Jeremy himself did not have any musical education until his nanny began arranging it in response to his interest. However, Yehudi began paying more attention to his son's musical career when his talent became clear. Jeremy studied composition in Paris with Nadia Boulanger, piano in Israel with Mindru Katz, and conducting in Vienna with Hans Swarowsky.

== Musical career ==
Menuhin made his London debut at the age of 15, on his father's fiftieth birthday, performing with the London Philharmonic Orchestra. Later that year, he played at the Menuhin Festival Gstaad established by his father nine years earlier, and proceeded to wider public attention as a musician in his own right. In 1968, he played with the London Philharmonic again to record an LP for Angel Records along with aunts Hephzibah and Yaltah, all conducted by Yehudi. He made his American debut in 1970. The development of his career was interrupted in 1974 by a strained tendon, forcing him to cancel all public performances for a year and a half. However, he recovered and would go on to win the Young Concert Artists piano competition in New York in 1984. During his American tour in 1986, he played at the Miami Beach Theater of the Performing Arts. Reviewer Tim Smith from the Sun-Sentinel praised his technical skill but found his performance lacking in emotion.

Menuhin has played with the Berlin Philharmonic, the Royal Philharmonic, the English Chamber Orchestra, The Arnhem Philharmonic Orchestra, the Vienna Philharmonic, and the Tonhalle Orchester Zürich among others. His recording of Bartok's Sonatas for violin and piano with his father, Yehudi Menuhin, was awarded the 'Grand prix du Disque'.

In recent years Menuhin has rediscovered composing, a legacy of his years with Nadia Boulanger. His works include a Suite for two pianos in the Baroque Manner, a String Quartet, a piece for 'cello and piano four hands', a Fantasy for two pianos, a double piano concerto and transformed two movements of the Brahms sextets as well as the title movement from Schubert's Death and the Maiden Quartet.

== Personal life ==
In 1983, he married Brigid Gabriel Forbes-Sempill, the daughter of William Forbes-Sempill, 19th Lord Sempill, with whom he had two children, Nadya Cecilia Menuhin (born 1985) and Petroc Forbes Menuhin (born 1988). In response to his own childhood experiences, Menuhin placed a great emphasis on being involved in his children's lives; even after he and his wife later divorced, they continued to live within walking distance of each other so that Menuhin could maintain contact with his son. In 2007, he married South Korean pianist Mookie Lee, with whom he has a daughter.
