= Diana Gould (dancer) =

British ballerina

- Born: Diana Rosamond Constance Grace Irene Gould; 12 November 1912; London, England
- Died: 25 January 2003 (aged 90); London, England
- Occupation: Ballerina
- Spouse: Yehudi Menuhin (m. 1947; died 1999)
- Children: 3 children; 2 stepchildren
- Parent(s): Gerald Gould; Evelyn Suart

Diana Rosamond Constance Grace Irene Gould, later Diana Menuhin, Baroness Menuhin (12 November 1912 – 25 January 2003) was a British ballerina and occasional actress and singer, who is best remembered as the second wife of the violinist Yehudi Menuhin. As a dancer, however, she was described by Anna Pavlova as the only English dancer she'd seen who "had a soul", and by Arnold Haskell as "the most musical dancer the English have yet produced".

== Biography ==
=== Early life ===
Gould was born in Belgravia, London in 1912. Her father was Gerald Gould, a civil servant with the Foreign Office, and her mother was the pianist Evelyn Suart. She had an older brother, Gerard, and a younger sister, Griselda. Her father was of Irish descent but had been brought up in Paris; and her mother had studied in Brussels and Paris. Consequently, Diana was imbued with French culture and language from an early age. Her father died of typhoid fever in 1916, when Diana was aged only three.

In 1920, when she was seven, her mother married again, to Cecil Harcourt, a naval officer who eventually became Second Sea Lord and was knighted as Admiral Sir Cecil Harcourt in 1945.

=== Ballet career ===
Diana Gould's first taste of the excitement of the dance came when she danced an Irish jig for a school concert, when she was eight. Her mother took her to study with Lubov Egorova in Paris but she returned to London to join Marie Rambert's school at the age of nine, and studied with her for ten years. She was tall for a ballerina of that time (5 feet 8 inches (173 cm), and a tendency to clumsiness led to the nickname "Clumsina".

When she was 14, she partnered Frederick Ashton and danced the premiere of his first ballet, Leda and the Swan. Sergei Diaghilev noticed her and invited her to join his company, but he died before that plan could come about. These events were said to have been fictionalized in the movie The Red Shoes. The same bad luck happened with Anna Pavlova, who said that Diana was the only English dancer she'd seen who "had a soul". She was engaged to dance with Pavlova's troupe, but Pavlova died before it got off the ground. She continued to dance at Rambert's Ballet Club, and created roles in some Frederick Ashton ballets, including Capriol Suite. She appeared with Antony Tudor in Atalanta of the East and The Planets, and with Ninette de Valois in Bar aux Folies-Bergère. She also danced with Colonel de Basil's Ballets Russes.

She was a leading dancer in Marie Rambert's early seasons in the early 1930s, in such roles as Chiarina in Michel Fokine's Le Carnaval and the Chief Nymph in Vaslav Nijinsky's L'Après-midi d'un faune. She danced briefly in leading roles with George Balanchine's company Les Ballets 1933 in London and Paris, but declined his offer to join his new school in the United States (which became the New York City Ballet). She also turned down Léonide Massine's invitation. In 1933 she danced in the premiere of Frederick Ashton's Pavane pour une infante défunte. Her other roles included the title role in Antony Tudor's Lysistrata.

Having closed the door on international opportunities, she worked for a time with the Alicia Markova-Anton Dolin company in 1935. She also worked in theatre and made some films as a straight actress. She became the leading dancer of the Arts Theatre Ballet in 1940 and became prima ballerina of Jay Pomeroy's Russian Opera and Ballet Company at the Cambridge Theatre until 1944. She also became one of the first dancers to model for Fortnum and Mason's and fashion magazines.

From 1944 to 1946 she acted, danced and sang the role of Frou Frou in The Merry Widow in London and on tour.

=== Marries Yehudi Menuhin ===
Diana Gould met Yehudi Menuhin in 1944 and he was immediately struck by her beauty. He declared on the spot that they would one day marry, but she told him that that was 'nonsense' and reminded him his daughter had just turned five. He was still married to his Australian wife, Nola (née Nicholas), but that marriage had collapsed. He had two children (a son Krov and a daughter Zamira) and he was four years younger than Diana. He courted her for three years before she finally accepted his proposal. It also appears that the attraction was mutual, as she often seemed to appear wherever he was. They married at the Chelsea Registry Office on 19 October 1947, seventeen days after his divorce from Nola had become final. They had no time for a honeymoon as he had a concert to perform that night.

Yehudi's career became Diana's main purpose from then on, although she often experienced "agonising nostalgia" for her life as a dancer. As she wrote in Fiddler's Moll, "If one performing artist marries another, it is obvious that one of the two must dissolve his or her persona in the other". He regarded her loyalty as unquestionable. They jointly signed their names "Yehudiana". She was very protective of him (she was known for her sharp tongue), and devoted her life to creating a perfect environment for the expression of his talent. She accompanied him on all his many international tours. They had two children who survived, Gerard and Jeremy, and another died shortly after birth. Although it was difficult to leave their children in the care of others, she felt her duty to be with Yehudi and organise his affairs was more important. His appearances were planned two years in advance, and Diana would spend up to 17 hours a day organising his paperwork and travel arrangements. She pulled no punches, referring to herself as "the awfully frank and frankly awful Diana". He referred to her as "my heavenly host on this earthly way" and "the ever-trustworthy and inspired companion of a lifetime".

Yehudi Menuhin was made an honorary knight in 1965, but not being a British subject, he was not entitled to be known as Sir Yehudi, and neither did Diana Menuhin become Lady Menuhin. That changed in 1985, when he adopted British citizenship, and his knighthood became substantive. In 1993 Sir Yehudi was made a life peer, as Baron Menuhin of Stoke d'Abernon, Lord Menuhin died in Berlin in 1999, and Lady Menuhin in London in 2003, aged 90. She was survived by her two sons and her two stepchildren.

She wrote two autobiographies: Fiddler's Moll (1984) and A Glimpse of Olympus (1996). These display a gift with words and a blunt, self-deprecating wit.

Lady Menuhin's sister Griselda became the second wife of the pianist Louis Kentner.

== Bibliography ==
- Fiddler's Moll, 1984 autobiography
- A Glimpse of Olympus, 1996 autobiography

== Sources ==
- The Independent, Obituaries
