= Louis Kentner =

Hungarian musician

Louis Philip Kentner CBE (19 July 1905 – 23 September 1987) was a Hungarian, later British, pianist who excelled in the works of Chopin and Liszt, as well as the Hungarian repertoire.

== Life and career ==
He was born Lajos Kentner in Karwin, Austrian Silesia (present-day Karviná, Czech Republic), to Hungarian parents. In later life, he joked about being older than Czechoslovakia (formed in 1918 and dissolved, after his death, in 1993). He received his education as a musician at the Royal Academy of Music in Budapest from 1911 to 1922, studying with Arnold Székely (piano), Hans Koessler and Zoltán Kodály (composition), and Leó Weiner (chamber music). While a student, he first became acquainted with Béla Bartók, who remained a lifelong friend.

Kentner commenced his concert career at the age of 15. Until 1931, he was known internationally as Ludwig Kentner. In 1932, he was awarded the 5th Prize at the II International Chopin Piano Competition in Warsaw; and he won a Liszt Prize in Budapest. Kodaly composed his Dances of Marosszék for Kentner, who premiered the work in Budapest on 14 March 1927.

In 1935 he moved to England permanently with his wife, the fellow Hungarian pianist Ilona Kabos, and they made their home in London. Kentner gave radio broadcasts of the complete sonatas of Beethoven and Schubert, the complete Well-Tempered Clavier (Bach), and the complete Années de pèlerinage (Liszt). At the composer's request, he was the soloist at the Hungarian premiere of Bartók's Piano Concerto No. 2, in Budapest in 1933, under Otto Klemperer. In November 1942, Kabos and Kentner gave the world premiere of Bartók's Concerto for Two Pianos, Percussion and Orchestra in London. Kentner was the soloist at the first European performance of the Concerto No. 3 (in London, under Sir Adrian Boult, 27 November 1946). He and Yehudi Menuhin (his second wife's brother-in-law) gave the first performance of William Walton's Violin Sonata, at Zürich on 30 September 1949. He also championed late romantic Russian repertoire, including Balakirev and Lyapunov.

His playing was heard in Richard Addinsell's Warsaw Concerto from the soundtrack of the 1941 film Dangerous Moonlight. However, his hands were not shown, and he preferred to be uncredited as he did not think that being associated with film music would help his career. When the piece achieved worldwide popularity, however, he was happy to acknowledge his involvement.

He was President of the British Liszt Society for many years, until his death. In 1975 he invited the young Argentinian pianist Enrique A. Danowicz to receive his musical education under his personal care at the Menuhin School of Music in London, where Kentner was director at the time. Other pupils included Rachel Cavalho, Lady Rose Cholmondeley, Leigh Gerdine, Rhondda Gillespie, Benjamin Kaplan, Iris Loveridge, Omar Mejia, Bernard Pinsonneault, Lennart Rabes, Patricia Romero, Peter Simon, Ronald Styles, Marguerite Wolff and Mary Wu. He was a member of many music competition juries. He also composed, his output including orchestral works, chamber music, piano pieces and songs. His set of three Sonatinas was published by the Oxford University Press in 1939 and used by various music colleges for examination purposes.

== Private life ==
His marriage to Ilona Kabos ended in 1945, and he then married Griselda Gould, daughter of the pianist Evelyn Suart (Lady Harcourt), whose other daughter Diana became Yehudi Menuhin's second wife in 1947. He was naturalized in 1946 when living at 1 Mallord Street, Chelsea.
