= Gstaad Menuhin Festival =

Music festival

The Gstaad Menuhin Festival (frequently and informally known as the 'Menuhin Festival Gstaad') is a Swiss music festival founded by the violinist Yehudi Menuhin in 1957. It takes place in the Swiss alpine town of Gstaad every summer, and was started after a local director of tourism asked Menuhin to "enhance the summer season with some concerts."

The Menuhin family settled in Gstaad in 1957, the year of the first Gstaad Menuhin Festival. Early participants included Benjamin Britten and Peter Pears. It now consists of more than 50 concerts over a period of seven weeks, with a vast array of famous soloists and ensembles alike.

In 2012, it was held between Friday, 20 July and 8 September. Although Gstaad is the main focus of activities, many events take place in other venues in the Bernese Oberland. In 2012, the first concert was a recital by German violinist Julia Fischer in the church at Saanen. Other prominent soloists include pianist András Schiff, soprano Cecilia Bartoli, and cellist Sol Gabetta.

The festival awards the annual Olivier Berggruen Prize.
