= Hephzibah Menuhin =

American-Australian pianist and writer

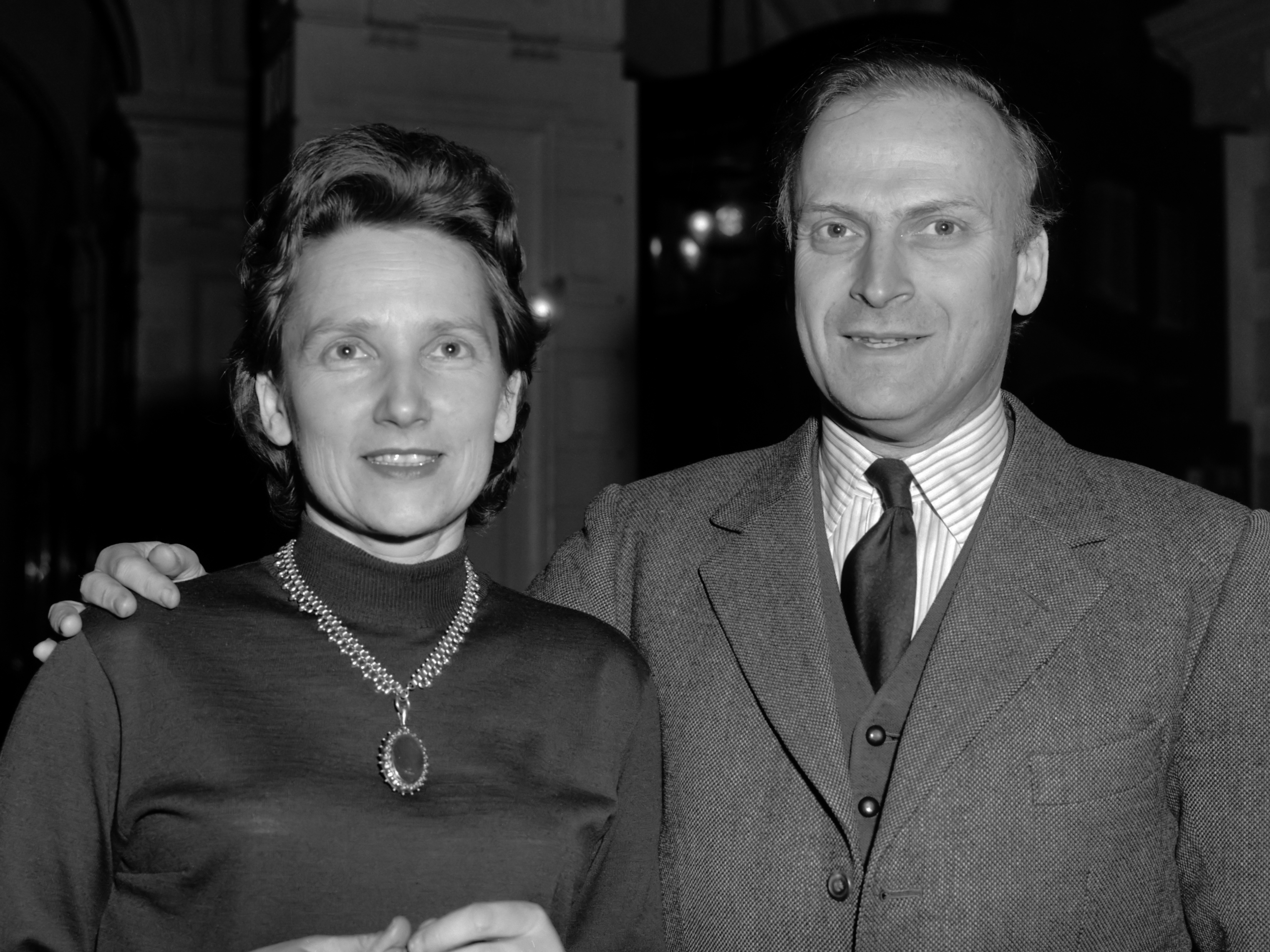
- Hephzibah and Yehudi Menuhin (1963)
- Born: 20 May 1920; San Francisco, California, U.S.
- Died: 1 January 1981 (aged 60); London, United Kingdom
- Spouses: Lindsay Nicholas (m. 1938) Richard Hauser (m. 1955)
- Children: 3
- Parent(s): Moshe Menuhin; Marutha Menuhin
- Hephzibah Menuhin's voice
- Hephzibah & Yehudi Menuhin in the Kreutzer Sonata, recorded 1934

Hephzibah Menuhin (20 May 1920 – 1 January 1981) was an American-Australian pianist, writer, and human rights campaigner. She was sister to the violinist Yehudi Menuhin and to the pianist, painter, and poet Yaltah Menuhin. She was also a linguist and writer, co-authoring several books and writing many papers with her second husband, Richard Hauser.

== Early life ==
Hephzibah Menuhin was born in San Francisco, California. Through her father Moshe Menuhin, Menuhin was descended from a distinguished rabbinical dynasty. Her mother, Marutha, has been described as "dominant and controlling".

The Menuhin children had little formal schooling. Hephzibah spent only five days at a San Francisco school, where she was classed as educationally backward. Her parents took her out of school and taught her to read and write at home. She started studying the piano at the age of four, initially with Judith Blockley, a specialist in teaching young children, and later with Lev Shorr, a Russian-born grand-pupil of Theodor Leschetizky and future teacher of Leon Fleisher.

She gave her first recital in San Francisco in 1928 when she was eight. She then studied with Rudolf Serkin in Basel and Marcel Ciampi in Paris. In 1933 she and Yehudi made their first recording (a Mozart sonata), which won the Candid Prize as best disc of the year. Her public debut was on 13 October 1934, at the Salle Pleyel in Paris. The siblings performed in the New York Town Hall and Queen's Hall in London, and Hephzibah gave solo recitals in most of the major cities of Europe and America.

=== Australian connection ===
In March 1938, after a concert at the Royal Albert Hall, Bernard Heinze introduced Hephzibah and Yehudi to the Australian brother and sister Lindsay and Nola Nicholas, heirs to the Australian 'Aspro' pharmaceutical fortune.

In quick succession, Yehudi (aged 21) married Nola, and Hephzibah (aged 17) married Lindsay, abandoning her plans to give her debut recital in Carnegie Hall, New York. She moved with Lindsay Nicholas to his grazing property "Terrinallum" near Derrinallum, Victoria, where she spent the next 13 years.

She started a traveling library for children and bore two sons, Kronrod and Marston Nicholas. However, while she curtailed her musical career, she did not entirely abandon it. She played with the Sydney and Melbourne Symphony Orchestras and she and Yehudi played together many times during his 1940 tour of Australia. She gave solo recitals, supported local activities such as the Griller Quartet, and was involved with Richard Goldner in the foundation of Musica Viva Australia.

She befriended many displaced European musicians who had emigrated to Australia. During this time she played the Australian premiere of Bartók's Second Piano Concerto. Both of the Menuhins' marriages to the Nicholases ended in divorce. Hephzibah's own two children remained with their father, Lindsay Nicholas.

== Career and causes ==
In 1947, she played at the Prague Spring Music Festival in a concert organised by Paul Morawetz, a Melbourne businessman. He took her to see the Theresienstadt concentration camp, which had a profound effect on her, forcing her to confront the meaning of her own Jewish heritage, and they entered a romantic relationship which lasted for several years.

In 1951 she and Yehudi played at the opening of the Royal Festival Hall in London, then made a concert tour of Australia and played and broadcast for the ABC. She supported all types of causes with concerts and recitals, such as the National Music Camp Association, and she was outspoken about the influence of television on children. In Sydney she was soloist in Juan José Castro's piano concerto, with the composer conducting (he was at that time the chief conductor of the Victorian Symphony Orchestra). In 1954 she moved to Sydney, where she gave concerts and opened her home to anyone in need. She was also connected with the Heide circle of contemporary artists and opened the Royal Tour Contemporary Art Exhibition in 1954 at Mirka Mora's studio in Melbourne.

=== London ===
In Sydney, Hephzibah Menuhin met and became involved with Richard Hauser, an Austrian Quaker sociologist and social commentator who had moved to Sydney with his family, then wife Ruth Hauser, and their daughter Eva. Hephzibah divorced her husband and married Hauser in Sydney in 1955. Two years later Menuhin and Hauser moved to London with their daughter, Clara Menuhin-Hauser, where they fostered Michael Alexander Morgan, a boy of mixed Welsh and Nigerian background, who grew up with Clara.

They founded the Institute for Human Rights and Responsibilities, and the Centre for Group Studies, and later moved to Friends Hall, a Quaker settlement house in Bethnal Green, in the East End of London. They later ran a Human Rights refuge from their house at 16 Ponsonby Place in Pimlico. This also became the base for The Institute for Social Research, which Sir Richard Hauser ran until his death. They worked on small-steps conciliation and attempted to help minorities all over the world, and she was a passionate supporter of women's and children's rights.

In 1977 Hephzibah Menuhin became the President of the British chapter of the Women's International League for Peace and Freedom. Hephzibah and Richard Hauser wrote "The Fraternal Society" (Bodley Head) together.

In 1962 she and Yehudi toured Australia. She toured with Yehudi and the Menuhin Festival Orchestra: the United States and Canada in 1967, and Australia in 1970 and 1975. In 1977 she was a member of the judges' panel for the first Sydney International Piano Competition. In Melbourne that year she played at a concert at which her son, Dr Marston Nicholas, made his public debut as a cellist.

In 1979 Hephzibah Menuhin made her last Australian concert appearances, playing with Yehudi and the Sydney String Quartet. She appeared with her brother for the last time at the Royal Festival Hall in London in November 1979.

== Death and legacy ==
Hephzibah Menuhin died in London on 1 January 1981, following a lengthy illness. Her brother, Yehudi, dedicated his Royal Albert Hall concert on 08 February 1981 and his Carnegie Hall concert of 22 February 1981 to her memory. Her recordings include Schubert's Trout Quintet with members of the Amadeus Quartet, Mozart concertos with her brother conducting, trios with Yehudi and Maurice Gendron, and sonatas with Yehudi.

== Memorial ==
The annual $8,000 Hephzibah Menuhin Memorial Scholarship for young Australian pianists was established in 1980. It is administered alternately by the University of Melbourne Faculty of Music and the Sydney Conservatorium of Music. The principal soloist's dressing room at the Melbourne Arts Centre's Hamer Hall was named in Hephzibah's honour.

In 1998 Curtis Levy produced and directed a documentary, Hephzibah. A biography An Exacting Heart was published in 2008 by Jacqueline Kent.

A biography of Yehudi Menuhin and his family entitled Yehudiana – Reliving the Menuhin Odyssey by Philip Bailey, who worked on the Menuhin staff from 1976 until Yehudi's death in 1999, was published in late 2008. This book contains some information concerning Hephzibah's life.
