= Moshe Menuhin =

American writer (1893–1982)

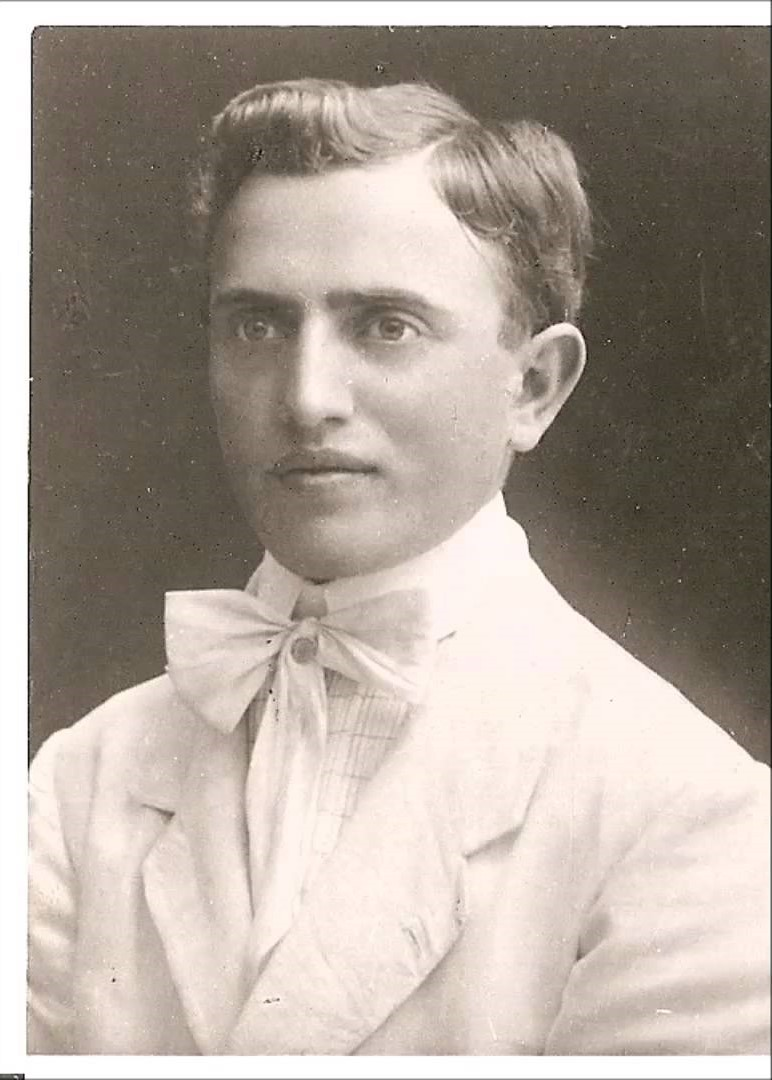
- Born: Moshe Mnuchin; November 12, 1893; Gomel, Russian Empire
- Died: February 4, 1982 (aged 88); Santa Clara, California, U.S.
- Citizenship: American
- Education: New York University
- Occupations: Writer; Teacher
- Notable work: The Decadence of Judaism in Our Time, Jewish Critics of Zionism, The Menuhin Saga
- Spouse: Marutha Sher
- Children: Yehudi Menuhin; Hephzibah Menuhin; Yaltah Menuhin
- Family: Rabbi Shneur Zalman of Liadi (great-great-grandfather); Rabbi Levi Yitzchok of Berditchev (great-great-grandfather)

Moshe Menuhin (1893–1982) was an American Jewish writer and teacher of Hebrew.

== Biography ==
Menuhin was born Moshe Mnuchin in Gomel to a distinguished, religious Lithuanian Jewish family. He was the great-great-grandson of Rabbi Shneur Zalman of Liadi, the founder of Chabad Hassidism, as well as Rabbi Levi Yitzchok of Berditchev.

When the family moved to the Yishuv, Moshe was sent to Orthodox Jewish schools, first to Yeshivas in Jerusalem, then to the Hebrew Gymnasia Herzlia in Jaffa - Tel Aviv.

In 1913 he came to the United States to complete his higher education, attending New York University where he studied mathematics, political science and education.

In late 1919 he and his wife Marutha (née Sher) became American citizens, and changed their surname to "Menuhin".

He later moved to Los Gatos, California, along with his family, where he worked as a Hebrew teacher.

His views were anti-Zionist, and were subject of controversy in the Jewish world. He was the author of The Decadence of Judaism in Our Time and Jewish Critics of Zionism, and of the family history The Menuhin Saga. In the 1960s, he served as a cultural and political advisor to the far-right German National-Zeitung.

== Family ==
Moshe Menuhin was the father of renowned violinist Yehudi Menuhin and pianists Hephzibah Menuhin and Yaltah Menuhin.

== Works ==
- The decadence of Judaism in our time. New York, Exposition Press, 1965
- "The Other Side of the Coin." Published circa 1967. A copy of which is held in the UN Library in Geneva.
- Quo vadis Zionist Israel? A 1969 postscript to The decadence of Judaism in our time. Beirut, Institute for Palestine Studies, 1969
- In memory of Count Folke Bernadotte of Sweden, United Nations mediator on Palestine New York : Arab Information Center, 1969
- Jewish critics of Zionism : a testamentary essay, with the stifling and smearing of a dissenter New York : League of Arab States, Arab Information Center, 1974
- The stifling and smearing of a dissenter By Moshe Menuhin
- A Jewish child in Czarist Russia Moshe Menuhin describes life in a Jewish ghetto of Czarist Russia. Hollywood, Calif. : Center for cassette studies, 1976
- The Menuhin saga: the autobiography of Moshe Menuhin. London : Sidgwick & Jackson 1984
