= Yaltah Menuhin =

American poet

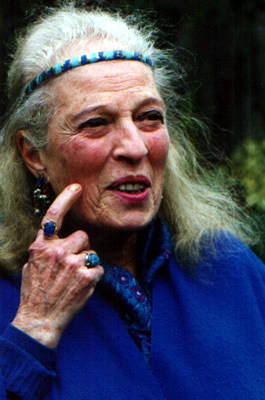
- Born: 7 October 1921; San Francisco, California, United States
- Died: 9 June 2001 (aged 79)
- Spouse(s): Anonymous (1938–1939); Benjamin Rolfe; Joel Ryce (1960–1998)
- Parent(s): Moshe Menuhin; Marutha Menuhin

Yaltah Menuhin (7 October 1921 – 9 June 2001) was an American-born British pianist, artist and poet.

== Early life ==
Yaltah was born in San Francisco, the youngest of three extraordinarily musically gifted children. Her siblings were Yehudi Menuhin and Hephzibah Menuhin. Through her father Moshe Menuhin, she descended from a distinguished rabbinical dynasty. Yaltah was named after her mother, Marutha's, home town of Yalta in Crimea. At the age of three, she became part of the rigorous regime already imposed on her siblings: the family employed tutors for the children, and Yaltah had her first piano lessons from the wife of the tutor in harmony and counterpoint. In 1960, she married (third marriage) an American pianist Joel Ryce who later retrained as a psychotherapist. Joel died in 1998.

She was taken to Paris at the age of four when Yehudi and Hephzibah went to study there. Marcel Ciampi, engaged to teach Hephzibah, initially refused to entertain the notion of teaching Yaltah at such a young age. However, Yaltah so impressed him with her spontaneous rendition of Schumann's Kinderszenen that he remarked, "Mrs. Menuhin's womb is a veritable conservatory," and agreed to take her on as well. Her taking piano lessons did not mean that her parents considered her - or for that matter, Hephzibah - capable of pursuing a career in music: Yaltah's mother in particular was firmly opposed to the idea that her daughters would follow in Yehudi's footsteps. Apart from Ciampi, she studied with Rudolf Serkin in Basel, Armando Silvestri in Rome and Carl Friedberg in New York.

== Career ==
One of Yaltah's earliest orchestral appearances was with Pierre Monteux and the San Francisco Symphony Orchestra, playing Beethoven's "Emperor" Concerto. Over the years Yaltah performed a wide repertoire. She played a pivotal role in the careers of numerous young composers, particularly during her stay in Los Angeles in the 1950s. She had a great love of chamber music and performed the sonata literature of the violin, viola and cello, as well as works for larger groups. Yaltah gave many first performances of works by Erich Zeisl, George Antheil, Ernst Krenek, Frank Martin, Louis Gruenberg, Mario Castelnuovo-Tedesco and Walter Piston. She recorded for Everest, EMI, Deutsche Grammophon Gesellschaft, SPA, Music Library and EMI-World Record Club.

Yaltah's tours took her from Alaska to New Zealand; from Texas to Switzerland. She appeared in duo recitals with cellists Gabor Rejto, George Neikrug, Guy Fallot and Felix Schmidt; violinist Israel Baker; violists Michael Mann and Paul Doktor, and with Joel Ryce in duo-piano with whom she performed regularly in recital, in double concertos, and in television specials in Paris, London and New York. She married Ryce in 1960, and their 40-year marriage was a happy one. The Menuhin-Ryce duo won the coveted Harriet Cohen International Music Award in 1962, in a programme largely devoted to works by Schubert for four hands. In 1966, they performed the Mozart Double Piano Concerto under the baton of Yehudi Menuhin in Gstaad and other venues in Europe. Yaltah and Joel Ryce were soloists in Saint-Saëns' The Carnival of the Animals for the BBC. In 1967, Yaltah and Joel recorded the entire duet repertoire of Mozart in America for Everest Records, the first time that this was done by one team of artists.

Yaltah performed regularly as both soloist and chamber player. In 1951 she made a joint New York debut with the violinist Israel Baker. Shortly before the outbreak of World War II, she enrolled at the Juilliard School of Music in New York using the assumed name of "Kate Davis". Nobody recognised this pianist even when she proved to be so talented that she was put in charge of teaching other students.

Highlights of Yaltah's career include a performance for Queen Elizabeth II at Windsor Castle in 1973, when she played the Schubert Notturno with Yehudi and Ross Pople; the Mozart Double Piano Concerto with Hephzibah for the Willa Cather centenary celebrations in America, and a recital with Joel at Queen Elizabeth Hall, London, when they played Bartók's Sonata for Two Pianos and Percussion. Her charity performances included evenings for the British Red Cross; the Organisation of Rehabilitation Training (ORT), Geneva; the Goulston Foundation, London; Pentonville Prison and for Friends of the Rose, Geneva. Her recorded favourites include the "family" recording of the Mozart Triple Concerto (Yaltah, Hephzibah and Jeremy at the piano, with Yehudi conducting) and the four-hand piano duets of Mozart with Joel.

Yaltah was a co-founder in 1965 (with Stefan Askenase and Johannes Wasmuth) and director of "Arts and Music", an international non-profit social project for the benefit of young artists and the arts in general. Marcel Marceau and Oskar Kokoschka were among its strongest supporters. "Arts and Music" - still active today - was housed in a beautiful old railway station at Rolandseck, near Bonn. She took a very keen interest in youth orchestras and frequently performed with the Brighton Youth Orchestra, also undertaking tours in Wales with Aelodau'r Gerddorfa, the all-Wales Youth Orchestra.

== Lifestyle, death and legacy ==
A gifted linguist, Yaltah wrote a poem each day of the year in one of six languages. In 1939 an anthology of her poetry, entitled Malgré L'Espace, was published privately. The anthology is currently held by the Harry Ransom Humanities Research Center at the University of Texas at Austin.

Yaltah died at her home in London on 9 June 2001, just a few days after giving her final recital at the Orwell Park School, Suffolk, of which she was Honorary Patron. Jonathan Benthall, a writer for The Guardian, described Yaltah as "a determined original, tireless in reaching out to feed, comfort, heal and advise.". Yehudi Menuhin wrote of her in his autobiography that she was "reaping the rewards in kindness and gratitude that life has otherwise denied her".
