= Escape to Life =

1939 book by Erika and Klaus Mann

- Cover of the original 1939 English-language edition
- Author: Erika Mann and Klaus Mann
- Language: English
- Publisher: Houghton Mifflin Company
- Publication date: 1939
- Publication place: U. S.
- OCLC: 253202

Escape to Life is a book of essays jointly written by the German writers Erika and Klaus Mann (daughter and son, respectively, of Thomas Mann). The book is about the world and culture of exiled German artists, scholars, and political figures during the initial part of the Nazi era, before the outbreak of World War II. It was originally published by Houghton Mifflin in the United States in English translation April 14, 1939; an expanded edition was published in German as Escape to Life. Deutsche Kultur im Exil in 1991. The German edition consisted largely of the original German-language texts, although a small portion of (about 5%) it had to be re-translated from English because the original texts were lost.

The book, commissioned by Houghton Mifflin, was a sort of "Who's Who" of the German exile community. The authors, Erika and Klaus Mann were themselves in American exile at the time, having escaped Germany in 1933, shortly after the Reichstag fire. Their work was translated from German to English by the Scottish writer/publicist Mary Hottinger. Many of the portrayed musicians, literary figures, artists, scientists and physicians frequented their father Thomas Mann's house. The original 375-page 1939 edition included illustrated biographies, anecdotes and character analyses of such German and Austrian exiles as Albert Einstein, Lion Feuchtwanger, Sigmund Freud, George Grosz, Ferdinand Kramer, Thomas Mann, Max Reinhardt, Arnold Schoenberg, Ernst Toller, Bruno Walter, and Stefan Zweig. One chapter, "Culture in the Third Reich," dealt with cultural figures such as Gustaf Gründgens who had come to terms with Nazi Germany.

The book remained unpublished in Germany, and in the German language, throughout the lifetime of its authors. In 1991, Edition Spangenberg (Munich) published a German-language version compiled by Heribert Hoven, who also wrote a foreword.

A film Escape to Life: The Erika and Klaus Mann Story (2000, Andrea Weiss and Wieland Speck), a documentary with dramatized episodes, told the story of Erika and Klaus Mann. Christoph Eichhorn played Klaus Mann in the dramatized scenes; elsewhere he was voiced by Corin Redgrave. Cora Frost played Erika Mann, voiced by Vanessa Redgrave.

== Editions ==
- Mann, Erika; Mann, Klaus (1939). Escape to Life. Boston: Houghton Mifflin Company. OCLC 253202.
- Mann, Erika; Mann, Klaus (1991). Hoven, Heribert (ed.). Escape to Life: Deutsche Kultur im Exil (in German). Munich: Edition Spangenberg. ISBN 3-89409-055-3. (first German-language edition)
- Mann, Erika; Mann, Klaus (1996). Hoven, Heribert (ed.). Escape to Life: Deutsche Kultur im Exil. Rororo (in German). Vol. 13992. Reinbeck: Rowohlt Taschenbuch Verlag. ISBN 3-499-13992-8.

== Sources ==
- Klaus Mann: Der Wendepunkt. Ein Lebensbericht (= Rororo 24409). Erweiterte Neuausgabe. Mit Textvarianten und Entwürfen im Anhang herausgegeben und mit einem Nachwort von Fredric Kroll. Rowohlt-Taschenbuch-Verlag, Reinbek bei Hamburg 2006, ISBN 3-499-24409-8.
