= Reich Chamber of Literature =

Nazi Authority Governing Literature

The Reich Chamber of Literature (Reichsschrifttumskammer) was a government agency of Nazi Germany between 1933 and 1945. It was one of several chambers belonging to the Reich Chamber of Culture (Reichskulturkammer) overseen by Joseph Goebbels and the Reich Ministry of Public Enlightenment and Propaganda. The Chamber's primary purpose was to regulate the publishing, distribution, and censorship of all literature within Germany and its occupied territories. Additionally, it promoted and advertised literature that was seen as useful for the implementation of Nazi ideology. Its jurisdiction was absolute, and extended not only to libraries, publishing houses, and literary agencies, but also to individuals and the private composition of written work.

== History ==
The Reich Chamber of Literature was established on 1 November 1933 as part of the First Ordinance Implementing the Reich Chamber of Culture Act. This was after its parent body, the Reich Chamber of Culture, was founded on 22 September. The agency was created at the instigation of Joseph Goebbels, Nazi Minister of Propaganda, for the reported sole purpose of, as defined in the Manual of the Reich Chamber of Culture, to keep 'the profession [of literature] free from undesirable elements and the book market free from un-German books'.

The Chamber was founded on a number of professional associations that had been absorbed as part of the Nazi's coordination and consolidation process (Gleichschaltung). These included the Reich Association of German Writers (RDS), the Germans Booksellers' Association (BDB), the Association of German Librarians (VDB), the Association of German People's Librarians (VDV), and the Society of Bibliophiles.

After Germany's surrender on 7 May 1945, the Chamber was officially dissolved on 10 October. This was per Control Council Law No. 2, a piece of legislation issued by the Allied Control Council as part of the official denazification process that aimed to abolish all Nazi organizations or institutions established as instruments of party domination.

== Functions and Purpose ==
The Reich Chamber of Literature was responsible for the publishing, censorship, and promotion of all written work within Germany and its territories. According to Nazi cultural policy, this system was intended to prevent the circulation of ideologies deemed incompatible with National Socialism while promoting works aligned with state ideology.

Gottfried Benn, a popular German writer of the time, wrote in July 1937 that the chamber's foremost mission was to ensure that no book 'was to appear in Germany that holds the new state in contempt.'

=== Regulation of publishing ===
The Chamber of Literature primarily regulated publishing in Germany by prohibiting anyone from doing it unless they were a member of the chamber itself. This extended to not only writers, poets, screenwriters, drama critics, translators, publishing houses, booksellers (both first and second hand), and lending libraries, but also anything connected with the book trade, like scientific, academic, and technical publications. This made membership compulsory for anybody who wished to pursue a career in literature, meaning that they had to conform to find any success or spread their work.

Membership was dictated through a careful screening process. Those of Jewish dissent or defined as undesirable through the Nuremberg Laws were excluded from joining, as were any dissidents or people who had been deemed politically suspect or unreliable in their past. Moreover, those who were retroactively found to have written works that were unbefitting of the Nazi regime, or began to involve themselves in anti-German activities, were expelled and banned from the chamber and thus publishing any subsequent work. They were also oftentimes disgraced and had their works rescinded from circulation.

=== Process of censorship, supervision, and revisionism ===
The powers of censorship, supervision, and revision were established in a decree on 4 February 1933 immediately after Adolf Hitler became Chancellor of Germany. It noted that police were afforded the right to seize any books that 'tended to endanger public security and order'. The Reichstag Fire Decree also included similar provisions.

The Chamber of Literature censored literature through a screening process dependent on public denunciation. Essentially, books that were found to possess undesirable elements that interfered with Nazi ideology or were critical of the regime were reported to the local authorities, like the police or a Gestapo office. This would then be forwarded to the Gestapo headquarters at Prinz-Albrecht-Straße 8 in Berlin, and would then be sent to the Chamber of Literature. After reviewing said work, it would then be sent further to Department VIII of the Ministry of Propaganda for a final decision. If the book was ultimately found to be unattractive, the Chamber of Literature would enter it into a database and order the confiscation of all editions if possible, usually an action performed by local Gestapo offices, agents of the criminal police, or workers for the Ministry of the Interior through raids in rapid succession. In 1934 alone, this process led to 4100 books being censored and confiscated.

Works of literature that were censored and confiscated often proved critical of the Nazi Regime or opposed its fundamental ideas. For example, famous authors such as Thomas Mann, Heinrich Mann, Lion Feuchtwanger, Bertolt Brecht and Arnold Zweig were all banned from publishing and restricted from joining the chamber because they dealt with themes undesirable to the Nazi party. Most notably, Erich Maria Remarque and his work 'All Quiet on the Western Front' was banned and destroyed because it dealt with concepts like fatalism, defeatism, and more or less accepted Germany's defeat in the First World War. With this, foreign works alike were also regulated. This is evident in the confiscation of Charles Dickens' Oliver Twist.

Goebbels and the Chamber did recognise and was careful to not carry out the 'cultural revolution' of Germany to such lengths that the popular demand for entertainment was stifled by ideological correctness. As such, books were cautiously confiscated and the Chamber actually preferred to alter editions rather than get rid of them altogether in many cases. This included but was not limited to rewriting passages, entire pages or chapters, changing titles or book covers, and even accrediting work to more desirable and reputable authors.

=== System of promotion and advertisement ===
The Chamber acknowledged that literature was an extremely powerful medium in spreading their ideology. As a result, the body introduced various methods of advertisement, both for promotion and dissuasion. For example, the author Heinrich Heine was used as a display of a futile Jewish attempt to imitate the glory of German literature, and the German Book Week, held annually from 1934 onwards, assembled the nation's most acclaimed authors to display their newest works and encourage the consumption of ideologically responsible literature.

Additionally, with more banned authors, the German population was forced to read books that were left with no competition, and so ones that obviously espoused Nazi ideals were inadvertently promoted because they were the only ones left on bookshelves and in stores. As such, the best selling books in Germany at this time aligned with the orders to 'capture the spirit of the new times' as set out by the chamber in its handbook. This is evident in Kuni Tremel-Eggert's Barb which sold 750,000 copies in just 10 years from 1933, despite doing 'little more than purveying in fictionalised form the key Nazi tenets of a woman's place in society.' Furthermore, Coelestin Ettighofer's Verdun, the Supreme Judgement sold 330,000 copies in 1936-40 precisely because it was one of the only books that remained that glorified the nation's battles on the Western Front of the First World War.

== Structure and organization ==
The Reich Chamber of Literature was one of seven individual chambers belonging to the Reich Chamber of Culture. It was ultimately under the leadership of Joseph Goebbels and the Ministry of Public Enlightenment and Propaganda.

=== Departments ===
- Administration
- Professional, legal, and social support of writers
- Book trade
- Literary associations and lectures
- Public and specialist libraries
- Handbooks and reference works

=== Chamber presidents ===
- 1 November 1933 – 3 October 1935: Hans-Friedrich Blunck
- 3 October 1935 – 10 October 1945: Hanns Johst

=== Chamber vice-presidents ===
- 1933–1937: Heinz Wismann
- 1937–1938: Karl Heinz Hederich
- 1938–1945: Wilhelm Baur

=== Regional heads (Landesleiter of individual Gau) ===
- Felix Wilhelm Beielstein (Essen)
- Bruno Peyn (Hamburg)
- Georg Grabenhorst (Hanover)
- Heinz Steguweit (Cologne-Aachen)
- Walter Best and Karl Kaltwasser (Kurhessen)
- Hanns Maria Lux (Moselland)
- Linus Kefer (Upper Danube)
- Kurt Kölsch (Saarpfalz)
- Hans Ehrke (Schleswig-Holstein)
- Paul Anton Keller (Styria)
- Hans Christoph Kaergel and Alfons Hayduk (Silesia)
- Fritz Fink (Thuringia)
- Rudolf Ahlers (Mecklenburg)
- Will Vesper (Saxony)
- August Hinrichs (Weser-Ems)
- Fritz Nölle and Josef Bergenthal (Westphalia)
- Karl Hans Strobl (Vienna)
- Bruno Prochaska (Lower Danube)
- Georg Schmückle (Württemberg)
- B. Martin Wülfing (Berlin)
- Josef Berg (Munich-Upper Bavaria)
- Franz Kraus (Sudetenland)

(As of 1939)

=== Department heads ===
- Karl Heinl (Administration)
- Kurt Metzner (Professional, legal, and social support of writers, 1933–36)
- Gerhard Schumann (Professional, legal, and social support of writers, 1936–41)
- Alfred Richard Meyer (Professional, legal, and social support of writers, 1941–45)
- Wilhelm Baur (Book Trade)
- Adolf Spemann (Public and Specialist Libraries)
