= Mephisto (novel) =

1936 novel by Klaus Mann

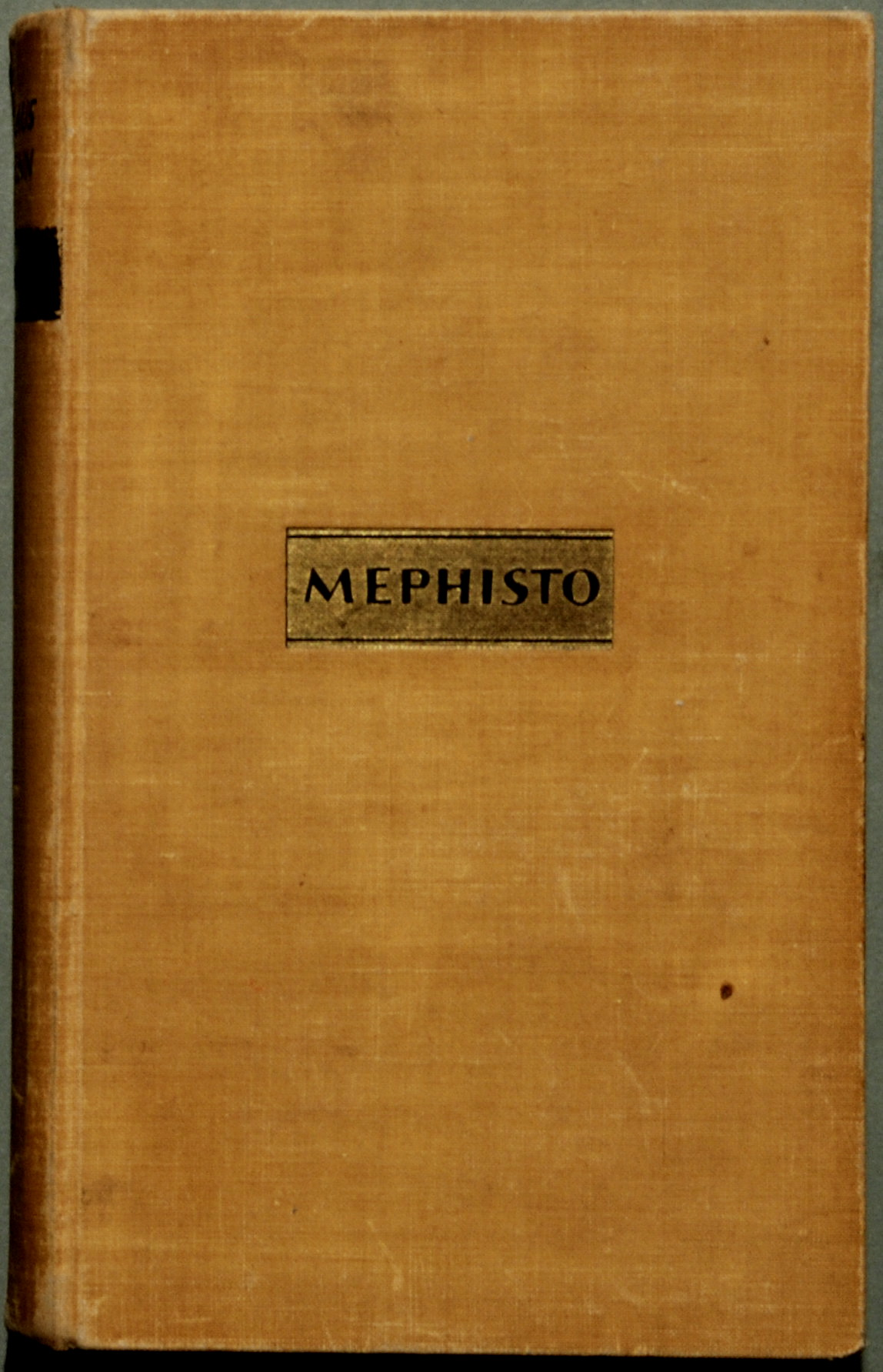
- Author: Klaus Mann
- Original title: Mephisto: Roman einer Karriere
- Language: German
- Genre: Theatre-fiction
- Publisher: Querido Verlag (Amsterdam)
- Publication date: 1936
- Publication place: Germany

Mephisto – Novel of a Career is the sixth novel by German author Klaus Mann.

The novel adapts themes from the Faust legend to follow the life of actor Hendrik Höfgen, a thinly disguised portrait of German actor Gustaf Gründgens. The actor abandons his conscience to ingratiate himself with the National Socialist German Workers Party (Nazis), keep his job and improve his social positions.

Mephisto was first published in 1936 by an Exilliteratur firm based in Amsterdam, while the author was in self-imposed exile from the Hitler regime. It was published for the first time in Germany in the East Berlin Aufbau-Verlag in 1956.

An English translation, by Robin Smyth, was published in 1977.

The novel was adapted into an award-winning film of the same title, released in 1981.

== Background ==
Klaus Mann fled to exile in March 1933 to avoid political persecution by Hitler's regime. In Amsterdam he worked for the exile magazine Die Sammlung, which attacked National Socialism. His friend and publisher Fritz Helmut Landshoff made him a "relatively generous offer", as Mann wrote to his mother on 21 July 1935. He was to receive a monthly wage to write a novel. Mann originally intended to write a utopian novel about Europe in 200 years. However, Mann discarded this idea stating that he could not write an apolitical novel at that point in history. The author Hermann Kesten suggested that he write a novel of a homosexual careerist in the Third Reich, with the director of the state theatre Gustaf Gründgens as a subject matter. Gründgens's homosexuality was widely known.

In 1924, Klaus Mann, his sister Erika, Gründgens, and Pamela Wedekind had all worked together on a stage production of Mann's Anja und Esther and had toured through Germany. Gründgens and Erika Mann got engaged while Klaus Mann similarly got engaged to Wedekind. The first two got married in 1926 but divorced in 1929 and Wedekind married writer Carl Sternheim a year later. Gründgens and Mann had both belonged in the early 1930s to a strongly left-wing theatre group that in January 1933 was touring Spain. When Hitler became German Chancellor on 30 January 1933, the group was in Madrid, and Mann urged Gründgens not to return to Germany. When Gründgens disregarded Mann's advice and not only returned to Germany, but embraced the Nazi regime (for purely opportunistic reasons), Mann never forgave his former friend Gründgens. Klaus Mann was exiled in 1934; Gründgens became a renowned theater and movie director in Nazi Germany. While Mann never called Gründgens an adversary, he admitted "moved antipathy". Although he attacked Gründgens in newspaper articles, Mann hesitated to use homosexuality as a theme in the novel as he himself was gay and decided to use "negroid masochism" as the main character's sexual preference. Klaus Mann's biographer Frederic Spotts points out that, under the Nazis' persecution of gay men, if the novel had indicated the actual nature of the actor's relationships, the boyfriend's character would have been recognized and the person endangered, which was against Klaus Mann's values and activism as a leading anti-fascist. (See Cursed Legacy: the tragic life of Klaus Mann, Yale UP, New Haven, 2016).

After the novel's publication in 1936, the newspaper Pariser Tageszeitung presented it as a roman à clef. Mann resented this characterization and argued that he had not written about a particular individual, but about a type of individual.

== Synopsis ==
The novel portrays actor Hendrik Höfgen's rise from the Hamburger Künstlertheater (Hamburg Artists' Theater) in 1926 to nationwide fame in 1936. Initially, Höfgen flees to Paris on receiving news of the Nazis' rise to power because of his communist past (learning from a friend that he is on a blacklist). A former co-actress from Hamburg, Angelika Siebert, travels to Berlin to convince Lotte von Lindenthal, the girlfriend (and later wife) of a Luftwaffe general, to have him pardoned. On returning to Berlin he quickly manages to win over Lotte and her general, and with his support has a wonderful career.

On obtaining the role of Mephisto in Faust Part One he realizes that he actually made a pact with evil (i.e. Nazism) and lost his humane values (even denouncing his mistress as "Black Venus"). There are situations where Höfgen tries to help his friends or tell the prime minister about concentration camp hardships, but he is always concerned not to lose his Nazi patrons.

== Plot ==
The Prussian Ministerpräsident (Prime Minister) celebrates his 43rd birthday in 1936 in the Berliner Opernhaus (Berlin Opera House). The party is so magnificent and extravagant that the foreign guests feel intimidated. As the propaganda minister enters the hall, his presence creates a stir. He is surrounded by an ice-cold atmosphere. Despite his disability he walks through the hall directly towards the director of the state theatre, Hendrik Höfgen. Although the Prime Minister hates Höfgen, he allows himself to be photographed conversing with him. To guarantee a good consequence of his appearance, the Ministerpräsident delays his arrival to the party. Later he enters with his wife, Lotte Lindenthal.

The story then reverts to the mid-1920s: Hendrik Höfgen, Otto Ulrichs and Hans Miklas belong to the Hamburger Künstlertheater (Artists' Theatre in Hamburg). Höfgen currently works there as an actor and director, and is friends with Otto Ulrichs, as they incessantly plan a "revolutionary theatre." The Hamburger Künstlertheater is the first rung on Höfgen's career ladder. He works there 16 hours a day and often suffers from fits of excitement and nerves. He demonstrates superiority over his colleagues. When the Berlin actress Dora Martin has a guest performance, he hides in her dressing room. Although he didn't see her performance, he congratulates her for it. Hans Miklas, a follower of the NSDAP, talks negatively of Martin because of her Jewish origin. In a harbour pub in Hamburg, he gets to know Juliette Martins. Her father is an engineer from Hamburg and her mother was African, giving Juliette her dark skin. She gives Höfgen dance lessons and becomes his mistress.

In the Hamburger Künstlertheater "Spring's Awakening" ("Frühlings Erwachen") is being rehearsed. Here Höfgen acts as a tyrant towards his colleagues. He adjourns the rehearsal in the afternoon because of his dance lesson. Juliette is the only person he allows to address him as Heinz – not even his family are allowed this. Höfgen is introduced to Barbara Bruckner (the daughter of Geheimrat Bruckner) by his colleague Nicoletta von Niebuhr. She encourages Höfgen to woo Barbara. To Barbara's surprise he does it, and they marry quickly. They spend their honeymoon in the Upper Bavarian lakes. Nicoletta joins them and is visited almost daily by the eccentric writer Theophil Marder. Two weeks after their return, Hendrik again meets with Juliette. Theophil Marder writes Nicoletta a telegram, saying that his feelings are hurt by his marriage; a wife must belong to her husband regardless of circumstances. Nicoletta von Niebuhr travels straight to him and gives up her job. She marries the man, 30 years her senior.

In 1928, Höfgen takes a role in a comedy in Vienna. He receives his place there on the recommendation of Dora Martin, Geheimrat Bruckner and Theophil Marder. He leaves the Hamburger Künstlertheater after an argument with Hans Miklas, after he called Lotte Lindenthal a blonde cow. Through the support of Dora Martin, Höfgen receives a role in the State Theatre in Berlin. There he makes his career; his fee triples. He even sings for the evening performance of Chansons in the Music Hall. Now he spends a week at the Reichskanzlerplatz (Chancellor of the Reich) and learns to drive. Geheimrat Bruckner and his daughter Barbara come to Berlin less and less often and withdraw from Höfgen.

He rents a room for Juliette in a remote corner of Berlin. Then he visits her during the week. In 1932, "Faust" is included in the play's performance listings to commemorate 100 years since the death of Goethe. Höfgen takes the role of Mephisto, which becomes his most successful part. Höfgen can hardly believe that the Nazis will come to power, but on 30 January 1933, Hitler is named as the new Reichskanzler (Chancellor of the Reich). At this time, Höfgen starts shooting a film in Madrid. Dora Martin emigrates to America. Once the shooting in Spain is finished, Höfgen doesn't return to Germany, instead travelling to Paris, because he had been warned that he was on the Nazi blacklist. After his colleague from Hamburg Angela Siebert puts in a good word for him with Lotte Lindenthal, Lotte decides to choose him as her partner for her debut performance at the Berlin State Theatre. Höfgen therefore is under the protection of the Ministerpräsident and can return to Germany. "Faust" is again written in the performance listings of the State Theatre. Höfgen tells Lotte that he would like to play Mephisto. Again, she manages to get him this part. Thanks to his patron, he organises the release of Otto Ulrichs, whom the Nazis had imprisoned in a concentration camp for his communist beliefs. Höfgen convinces him to take a job at the State Theatre. Meanwhile, Hans Miklas feels betrayed by national socialism, since in his opinion it was of no benefit to Germany.

Höfgen wants the Nazis to know nothing of his relationship with the dark-skinned Juliette. He implores her to leave Germany and go to Paris. Since Juliette refuses, Höfgen finds no alternative but to allow Juliette to be arrested. In prison Höfgen tells her that he will get her sent to Paris and support her financially. In 1934, Barbara divorces Höfgen. She too lives in Paris. Nicoletta separates from her husband and returns to Berlin, to continue working as an actress. She works alongside Höfgen.

The Ministerpräsident and the propaganda minister argue over the choice of the new director of the State Theatre. The Ministerpräsident wants Höfgen to take the post and the propaganda minister disagrees, but eventually gives in. Höfgen takes over the position of Cäsar von Muck, who is named president of the "Dichterakademie" (Poetry Academy). In Paris, von Muck encounters Höfgen's black lover. Out of revenge he spreads the information. The Führer engages Höfgen for a short conversation on the matter, then dismisses him, content that the issue has been dealt with.

Höfgen buys a huge villa in Grunewald and calls his sister and parents to Berlin. He now marries Nicoletta to put an end to the rumours of his relationship with a black woman. Ulrichs once again works in underground communist circles. He now knows that Höfgen only lives for his fame. Ulrichs is again arrested. Höfgen begs for help from the Ministerpräsident, but he explains to Höfgen that he can no longer help and that he should say no more about it.

He plays his new role of Hamlet poorly, and suffers greatly from feelings of ineptitude. The premiere is very successful and the critics are impressed. The audience no longer assesses his artistic capabilities, but rather his relationship with power. At the end of the novel, he breaks down to his mother. She knows her son's susceptibility to nervous breakdowns, but notices in his composure that his spiritual condition is deep-rooted.

== Lawsuit ==
After Gründgens' death, his adopted son Peter Gorski sued the Nymphenburger Verlagsbuchhandlung, then the publisher of Mephisto in West Germany, and obtained the prohibition of publication, confirmed by the appeal judges of the Federal Court of Justice in 1968.

On 24 February 1971 the constitutional complaint was rejected by an equally divided Federal Constitutional Court, which ruled that the freedom of art (Article 5 Section 3 of the Basic Law) must be balanced against late Gründgens' personal dignity (Article 1 Section 1). The case, in which two judges wrote dissenting opinions, is considered a milestone in Germany's juridical history.

The novel was however still available (and importable) from the East German Aufbau-Verlag. In 1981 Rowohlt republished it in West Germany. Since the 1968 verdict concerned only Nymphenburger and Gorski never took legal action against Rowohlt, its Mephisto is still available.

=== Characters ===
Character	Personality	Position in society	Corresponding real person
Hendrik Höfgen	a typical opportunist, no values, arrogant and craving for power, adaptable, unscrupulous though not without conscience, ambitious and vain	actor, theatre director, artistic director	Gustaf Gründgens
Otto Ulrichs	actor, communist, resistance fighter	theatre; communist	Hans Otto
Juliette Martens	independent, engaged over many years by Höfgen as dance teacher and dominatrix, born in Africa from a German father and a Black African mother	nightclubs, outsider	Andrea Manga Bell
Dora Martin	successful actress (in Germany and abroad)	theatre; Jewish	Elisabeth Bergner
Nicoletta von Niebuhr	admires Marders (as a father figure), artistic lifestyle, extrovert	theatre	Pamela Wedekind
Lotte Lindenthal	poorly educated actress, believes in Nazism, marries Göring and becomes "First Lady of the Third Reich"	theatre, Nazi elite	Emmy Göring
Barbara Bruckner	intelligent, empathic, independent, marries Höfgen, becomes politically active after leaving Germany	liberal bourgeoisie	Erika Mann
Geheimrat Bruckner	intelligent family patriarch with cosmopolitan outlook	liberal bourgeoisie	Thomas Mann
Sebastian	Barbara's childhood friend	liberal bourgeoisie	Klaus Mann
Ministerpräsident	wears magnificent uniforms and holds expensive parties, loves the good life, cruel	Nazi elite	Hermann Göring
Theophil Marder	eccentric and egoistical playwright, successful as critic of Wilhelminism	intellectual	Carl Sternheim
the Professor	theatre director; owns theatres in Vienna and Berlin	theatre	Max Reinhardt
Cäsar von Muck	writer, bootlicker of the Nazis, whom he attempts to provide with an intellectual veneer of respectability	intellectual, Nazi	Hanns Johst
Benjamin Pelz	writer, dislikes progress and rationality, fascinated by Nazi brutality	intellectual, Nazi	Gottfried Benn
Pierre Larue	French envoy, admires the Nazis as revivers of a strong German spirit	diplomat; Berlin socialite	André Germain
Ihrig (Dr. Radig in a later edition)	theatre critic, was a left-wing critic of the Nazis, now aligned to Nazi rule	theatre	Herbert Ihering

== Adaptations ==
In 1981, Mephisto was adapted into a film directed by István Szabó, starring Klaus Maria Brandauer in the title role, produced by Manfred Durniok, with a screenplay by Péter Dobai and Szabó. The film received generally positive reviews and was the first Hungarian film to win an Academy Award for Best Foreign Film.

French playwright Ariane Mnouchkine adapted the story for the stage and was performed by the Royal Shakespeare Company at the Barbican Theatre from 1985 to 1986. It was published in the 1994 anthology, Plays by Mediterranean Women. In an early leading role, Alan Rickman played Hendrik Höfgen.

In 2013, Helen Edmundson wrote a stage adaptation of Mephisto, which was produced at the Altonaer Theater in Hamburg.
