= Alice van Nahuys =

Dutch translator and publisher (1894–1967)

- Born: Alice Emilie van Nahuys; 15 February 1894; Den Helder, Netherlands
- Died: 2 February 1967 (aged 72); St. Moritz, Switzerland
- Occupations: Translator, publisher
- Spouse: Frederic von Eugen (1897-1979)

Alice Emilie van Nahuys, later also known as Alice van Eugen-van Nahuys (15 February 1894 – 2 February 1967) was a Dutch translator and director of the publishing house Querido. She translated the work of Arthur Schnitzler and Franz Kafka into Dutch, and was the "leading force" behind an initiative to publish German writers in exile in the 1930s.

== Life ==
Alice van Nahuys was the daughter of Dutch parents, a Jewish mother and a naval officer. She was born in Den Helder. She lived in Belgium for a while before returning to the Netherlands in 1914 as a refugee from World War I. She met the publisher Emanuel Querido while she was working in an Amsterdam bookshop, and a close professional and personal relationship developed. She moved in to live with the Querido family in Laren.

Van Nahuys became co-director and a stockholder in the Querido publishing house in 1930. In 1933, she and Emanuel Querido set up a separate publishing house, Querido Verlag, to publish exiled German writers. Since Querido did not speak or read German, van Nahuys led the effort. She also supervised the publication of several exiled writers in Dutch translation, and helped launch Salamander, a successful low-priced paperback literary series, in 1934. In 1937 van Nahuys announced her plan to marry Fred von Eugen, the Querido sales manager, who had also been living in the Querido household. After Emmanuel Querido reacted by angrily firing Von Eugen from the company, van Nahuys also resigned. Both subsequently rejoined Querido, but on condition that van Nahuys gained half of Querido's personal stock, the other half going Querido's son Arie. She "was now in charge" of the Querido publishing house. After the Nazi invasion of the Netherlands in 1940, Querido stepped down and went into hiding. He was later captured and died in Sobibor extermination camp. In early 1941 the Germans took over management of the company, and van Nahuys – herself half-Jewish – also stepped down.

After the war van Nahuys restarted Querido Press for a while. In 1965, van Nahuys was knighted in the Order of Orange-Nassau. On 2 February 1967, she died in St. Moritz, Switzerland at the age of 72. In 1968, the Alice van Nahuys Prize was instituted by Querido Publishers. The prize is awarded once every two years for the best literary debut.

== Translations from the German ==
- Casanova's terugkeer by Arthur Schnitzler. Amsterdam: E. Querido, 1920. Translated from Casanovas Heimfahrt.
- Kubinke: roman by Georg Hermann. Amsterdam: Querido, 1921.
- In het rijk van Siameezen en Maleiers by Hans Morgenthaler. Amsterdam: Querido, 1922. Translated from Matahari. Stimmungsbilder aus den malayisch-siamesischen Tropen.
- Natuur en volk van de Stille Zuidee by Norbert Jacques. Amsterdam, E. Querido, 1924.
- Else by Arthur Schnitzler. Amsterdam: Em. Querido, 1926. Translated from Fräulein Else.
- Carnaval by Arthur Schnitzler. Amsterdam: Querido, 1927. Translated from Traumnovelle.
- Thèrese; kroniek van een vrouwenleven by Arthur Schnitzler. Amsterdam: Querido, 1929. Translated from Therese. Chronik eines Frauenlebens.
- Bekentenissen van de oplichter Felix Krull by Thomas Mann. Amsterdam: Querido, 1938. Translated from Bekenntnisse des Hochstaplers Felix Krull.
- Ik beleefde vijftig jaren wereldgeschiedenis by Berta Szeps-Zuckerkandl. Amsterdam: Querido, 1939. Translated from Ich erlebte fünfzig Jahre Weltgeschichte.
- Het proces: roman by Franz Kafka. Amsterdam: Amsterdamsche Boeken Courantmij, 1947. Translated from Der Process.
- De verduisterde hemel by Franz Werfel. Amsterdam: Querido, 1956. Translated from Der veruntreute Himmel.
