= Fredric Kroll =

American-German composer and writer (1945–2026)

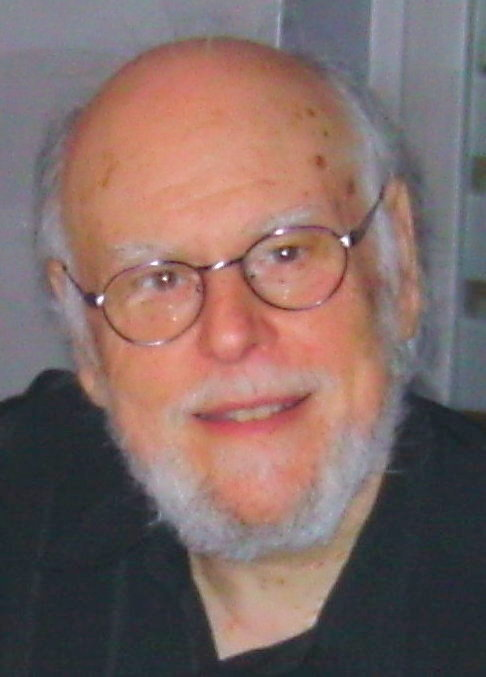

Fredric Joseph Kroll (7 February 1945 – 12 February 2026) was an American-German composer and writer.

== Life and career ==
Kroll was born in Brooklyn, New York, on 7 February 1945, as the only child of the piano teacher and schoolteacher Alexander Kroll, born in New York City as the fourth child of White Russian Jewish immigrants, and the elementary school teacher Sarah Kroll, née Mahler, born in Warsaw. At the age of eleven, he began to compose a cycle of 30 piano pieces in all tonalities, including the enharmonic relationships, to explore the potentials of each tonality to express different emotions. He called them “Episodes,” in order to distinguish them from Chopin's “Préludes.” Although of uneven quality, they represent a quarry of thematic material (partially with Russian Jewish flavor) from which Kroll was later to draw in his magnum opus, his four-act opera The Scarlet Letter. He had written but five of the “Episodes” when, shortly after his twelfth birthday, he composed his Piano Sonata in B Minor which, albeit still brief, is a harbinger of his later ability to create in large forms. His Symphony in G Minor, written from 1957 to 1959, has a performance duration of about half an hour.

Kroll's further juvenilia include numerous piano pieces and a Sonata for Violin and Piano in G Minor (1958). A movement away from mere juvenilia makes itself noticeable in the ballad “Ulalume” after Edgar Allan Poe (autumn 1959), with which Kroll began, in effect, to discover his talent for vocal music.

1960 was a pivotal year for Fredric Kroll. In February, he read Nathaniel Hawthorne's novel The Scarlet Letter as required reading at James Madison High School in Brooklyn, and immediately set about composing the original version of the Prelude (radically rewritten in 1962, except for the beginning and the conclusion). On 9 August, he discovered Klaus Mann's novel “Pathetic Symphony” about Tchaikovsky, and bought, on the same day, his first recordings of works by Gustav Mahler. Having already studied orchestral scores by Tchaikovsky, Beethoven, and Brahms, he began, in 1960, to learn the actual technique of composition by playing through the piano-vocal scores of Puccini, Verdi, Alfredo Catalani, Tchaikovsky, and Vittorio Giannini's operatic setting of The Scarlet Letter from 1938.

He was rejected by the Eastman School of Music at the beginning of 1961 because he played neither oboe nor piano sufficiently well to meet the requirements for admission. The University of Rochester urged him to choose another major, and he opted for German Literature – with the intention of teaching German to voice students later on and thus entering the world of music through the back door, so to speak. During whatever spare time his studies afforded, Kroll continued to work on his own operatic version of The Scarlet Letter, completing the piano-vocal score on 10 January 1965, and devoting the subsequent months to writing his Senior Essay on the influence of Schopenhauer's philosophy on Richard Wagner's “Tristan und Isolde.” He received his A.B. In German Literature from the University of Rochester in 1965.

Partly as a result of the Metropolitan Opera's rejection of The Scarlet Letter, Kroll switched from composing operas to composing lieder, for the time being. His first collection, “Lieder aus der Einsamkeit” (1965–66), is a kind of by-product of The Scarlet Letter and attempts to fuse the genre of the lied with operatic elements. His following cycle to Italian texts by Henry Fregosi Loyzelle, “Frantumi” (“Shards of Glass,” 1967–69), is an antithetical experiment employing relatively sparse piano accompaniment.

Kroll earned his Artium Magister (Master of Arts degree) at Yale University in 1967. Having originally intended to cease graduate school at this point and start teaching, the outbreak of the Vietnam War necessitated his studying for a Ph.D. to avoid being drafted, and he returned to Rochester, where he prepared his doctoral thesis on Klaus Mann. In the summer of 1969 he received a Fellowship from the University of Würzburg and welcomed the opportunity to return to Germany – where he had already spent his Junior Year Abroad in 1963–64, while still composing The Scarlet Letter - to be the first person from outside the intimate circle of the Mann family to study Klaus Mann's unpublished manuscripts - about half of which are in English - near Zurich in April 1970. He started writing his dissertation in the fall of that year and was awarded his Ph.D. by the University of Rochester in 1973. During this time, he still struggled to compose lieder whenever possible.

From 1973 to 1974, in Berlin, Kroll completed his investigations into those of Klaus Mann's major works which his dissertation had not yet covered, and then received a part-time engagement as a teacher, more of German than of English, at Carl von Ossietzky High School in Hamburg-Poppenbüttel. A stint as a commercial translator in Kirchzarten near Freiburg followed in 1975 until the beginning of 1977, when he was commissioned by the Edition Klaus Blahak in Espelkamp to write the most comprehensive biography possible on Klaus Mann. During a hiatus in this task, from 1979 to 1980, he composed Act 1 of his second opera, Eine Nacht an der Newa (“A Night on the Neva”), on Dostoevsky's novella “White Nights” - the subject of which he had first encountered as a TV dramatization in Freiburg in 1964.

1980 brought with it the rediscovery in Germany of German Literature in exile from Nazi Germany, and with it the rediscovery of Klaus Mann – especially of his novel Mephisto, which was still banned in Germany. Suddenly, Kroll's work on Klaus Mann was in something akin to popular demand. After the triumphant staged world premiere of his Scarlet Letter with piano accompaniment under Kroll's own direction at Cape Coral High School in Florida on 10 January 1981 (on the selfsame evening, the first Klaus Mann exposition of all time opened in Ahlen in Westphalia, West Germany), Kroll composed up to and including 2003 only two songs, “Den ungeborenen Enkeln” (“To the Unborn Grandchildren,” 1986, after Clemens Brentano) and “Der Steppenwolf” after Hermann Hesse (2000) – in his own estimation, two of his best works. During this period, in the summer semesters of 1988 and 1989, Kroll led two undergraduate seminars at the University of Freiburg.

The entirety of Kroll's 3,000-page, 6-volume biography of Klaus Mann was published by the Männerschwarm Verlag in Hamburg on the occasion of the centennial of Klaus Mann's birth in 2006. For this occasion, and during a kind of working holiday in Fortaleza, Brazil, Kroll also edited and translated into German for the Rowohlt Verlag, Hamburg, fragments belonging to the sphere of Klaus Mann's autobiography Der Wendepunkt which had hitherto been published only in English (under the title “The Turning Point,” 1942), in Swedish – or not at all. After the centennial celebrations were over, Kroll began – again in Fortaleza – to carry out his intention, of which he had never lost sight, of orchestrating The Scarlet Letter, adding a considerable amount of counterpoint as he went along. This task was completed in February 2010. Kroll then set nearly half of his 41 lieder for printing at the computer, orchestrated Act 1 of Eine Nacht an der Newa, and composed and orchestrated Act 3. Act 2 was currently being composed as of December 2016.

In his own words, Fredric Kroll construed himself as a practitioner, not as a theoretician. When he started composing The Scarlet Letter in earnest in 1961, Robert Ward's neither musically or nor dramatically dissimilar opera The Crucible was premiered with success. It was not until 1964 in Freiburg that Kroll realized that the tonal and melodic Late Romantic music still today dear to his heart was considered to be obsolete and anachronistic. Kroll feels that writing only dissonances that never resolve is tantamount to an attempt to inhale without ever exhaling, to eat hot spices without meat or vegetables. To those who might reproach Kroll's music with “ escapism,” he replies that his compositions are not escapist at all, but replete with deep despair over the human condition, and that he feels it to be his mission to communicate to people imbued with compassion, to people to whom “just wanting to have fun” is alien in a world full of suffering, that they are not alone with their sorrows and their burdens.

Kroll died in Freiburg im Breisgau on 12 February 2026, at the age of 81.

== Compositions ==
- Symphony in g-minor, 1959
- The Scarlet Letter, Opera in 4 Acts, 1965, World premiere 1981 in Cape Coral, Florida and German language premiere 2014 in Hamburg
- Lieder aus der Einsamkeit, 7 Songs for Soprano or Tenor and Piano after texts by Goethe, Büchner, and Kroll, 1966, premiere 1982 in Wiesbaden
- Romance in d-minor for Violin and Piano, 1969
- Frantumi, 8 songs in Italian language for mezzo-soprano or baritone and piano after texts by Loyzelle and Kroll, 1969
- Kerzenglut (Candlelight) in d-minor for Violoncello and Piano, 1970
- Sieben Lieder (7 Songs) for voice and piano after texts by Clemens Brentano and Stefan George, 1972
- Die traurigsten Verse (Los versos mas tristes), 19 songs for voice and piano, 1970-2006, after texts by Neruda, Goethe, Rausch, Fehse, Scheer, Roessler, and Aumeier
- White Nights, Opera in 3 Acts, 2017
