= Hanns Johst =

German National Socialist poet and playwright (1890–1978)

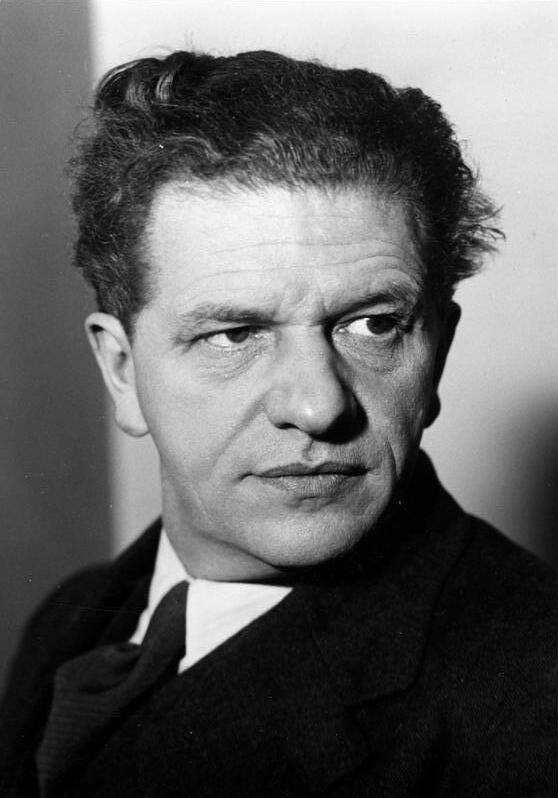
- Johst in 1933

First Chairman of the German Academy for Poetry
- In office 9 June 1933 – 8 May 1945

President of the Reich Chamber of Literature
- In office 2 October 1935 – 8 May 1945
- Preceded by: Hans-Friedrich Blunck

Personal details
- Born: 8 July 1890 Seerhausen, Kingdom of Saxony, German Empire
- Died: 23 November 1978 (aged 88) Ruhpolding, Bavaria, West Germany

Military service
- Allegiance: German Empire
- Branch/service: Imperial German Army
- Years of service: 1914–1918
- Battles/wars: World War I

Hanns Johst (8 July 1890 – 23 November 1978) was a German poet and playwright, directly aligned with Nazi philosophy, as a member of the officially approved writers’ organisations in the Third Reich. The statement “When I hear the word culture, I reach for my gun”, variously misattributed to Heinrich Himmler, Joseph Goebbels and Hermann Göring, was in fact a corrupted version of a line in his play Schlageter.

== Background ==
Hanns Johst was born in Seerhausen (now part of Stauchitz) in the Kingdom of Saxony as the son of an elementary school teacher. He grew up in Oschatz and Leipzig. As a juvenile he planned to become a missionary. When he was 17 years old he worked as an auxiliary in a Bethel Institution. In 1910 he earned his Abitur in Leipzig and then started studying medicine and philosophy and—later—history of art. He volunteered for the army in 1914 to serve in World War I. In 1918 he settled down in Allmannshausen (part of Berg) at the Starnberger See.

== Early work ==
His early work is influenced by Expressionism. Examples include Der Anfang (The Beginning) (1917) and Der König (The King) (1920). Later, he turned to a naturalist philosophy in plays such as Wechsler und Händler (Money changers and Traders) (1923) and Thomas Paine (1927).

Bertolt Brecht's first play Baal was written in response to Johst's play Der Einsame (The Lonely), a dramatization of the life of playwright Christian Dietrich Grabbe. In 1928 Johst joined Alfred Rosenberg's "Kampfbund für deutsche Kultur" (Militant League for German Culture) designed to combat Jewish influence in German culture. In 1932 he joined the Nazi party, explaining his agreement with Hitler's ideology in the essay "Standpunkt und Fortschritt" ("Standpoint and Progress") in 1933.

== Schlageter ==
When the Nazis achieved power in 1933, Johst wrote the play Schlageter, an expression of Nazi ideology which was performed on Hitler's 44th birthday, 20 April 1933, to celebrate his victory. It was a heroic biography of the proto-Nazi martyr Albert Leo Schlageter. The famous line "When I hear the word culture, I reach for my gun", often associated with Nazi leaders, derives from this play. The actual line in the play is, however, slightly different: "Wenn ich Kultur höre … entsichere ich meinen Browning!" "When I hear 'Culture'..., I release the safety on my Browning!" (Act 1, Scene 1). It is spoken by another character in conversation with the young Schlageter. In the scene Schlageter and his wartime comrade Friedrich Thiemann are studying for a college examination, but then start debating whether it is worthwhile doing so when the nation is not free. Thiemann argues that he would prefer to fight rather than study.

SCHLAGETER: Good old Fritz! (Laughing.) No paradise will entice you out of your barbed wire entanglement!

THIEMANN: That's for damned sure! Barbed wire is barbed wire! I know what I'm up against.... No rose without a thorn!... And the last thing I'll stand for is ideas to get the better of me! I know that rubbish from '18 ..., fraternity, equality, ..., freedom ..., beauty and dignity! You gotta use the right bait to hook 'em. And then, you're right in the middle of a parley and they say: Hands up! You're disarmed..., you republican voting swine!—No, let 'em keep their good distance with their whole ideological kettle of fish ... I shoot with live ammunition! When I hear 'Culture'..., I release the safety on my Browning!"

SCHLAGETER: What a thing to say!

THIEMANN: It hits the mark! You can be sure of that.

SCHLAGETER: You've got a hair trigger.

— Hanns Johst, Schlageter. Translated by Ford B. Parkes-Perret. (1984)

The line is frequently misattributed, sometimes to Hermann Göring and sometimes to Heinrich Himmler. In December 2007, historian David Starkey misattributed it to Joseph Goebbels in comments criticizing Queen Elizabeth II for being "poorly educated and philistine". It has also been adapted by, for example Stephen Hawking as "When I hear of Schrödinger's cat, I reach for my pistol" and by filmmaker Jean-Luc Godard in his 1963 film Le Mépris, when a producer says to Fritz Lang: "Whenever I hear the word culture, I bring out my checkbook." Lang evokes the original line when he answers "Some years ago—some horrible years ago—the Nazis used to take out a pistol instead of a checkbook." Songwriter Clint Conley of Mission of Burma titled a song he wrote in 1981 "That's When I Reach for My Revolver". In 1994, Tuli Kupferberg wrote the book When I Hear the Word 'Culture' I Reach for My Gun. In 2008 he wrote a book, Cartoons Collages and Perverbs [sic] with a cartoon in it reading "WHEN I HEAR THE WORD 'GUN' I REACH FOR MY CULTURE".

== Role in Nazi Germany ==
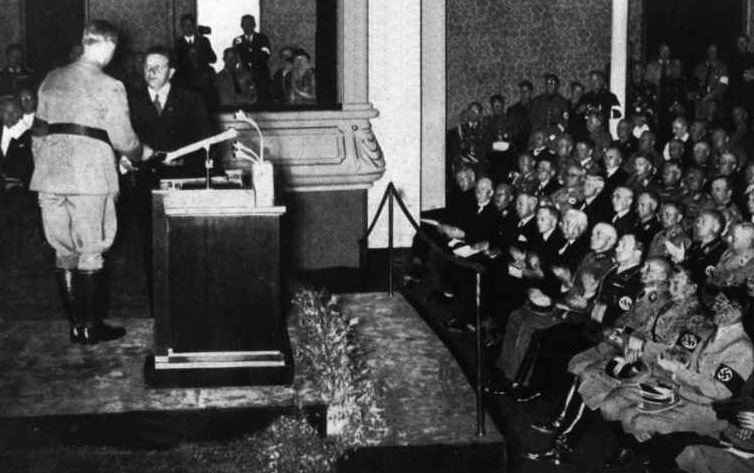
Johst receives a literary prize from Alfred Rosenberg

On 1 November 1932, Johst joined the Nazi Party (membership number 1,352,376). In 1933, Johst signed the Gelöbnis treuester Gefolgschaft, a declaration of loyalty to Hitler by pro-Nazi writers. Johst was named First Chairman of the Deutsche Akademie für Dichtung (German Academy for Poetry) on 9 June 1933, and on 15 January 1934, Prussian Minister President Hermann Göring appointed him a member of the Prussian State Council. Succeeding Hans-Friedrich Blunck in October 1935, Johst became the President of the Reich Chamber of Literature, a powerful organisation for German writers. In the same year, the last prominent Jewish writers, e.g. Martin Buber, were expelled from the Reichsschrifttumskammer.

By that time, those organisations restricted membership to writers whose work was either explicitly pro-Nazi or at least approved of by the Nazis as "non-degenerate". Johst achieved other positions of importance within the Nazi state and, in the Gottbegnadeten list of September 1944, he was named as one of the Reich's most important artists. He joined the Allgemeine-SS on 9 November 1935 (SS member number 274,576) and rose to the rank of SS-Gruppenführer on 30 January 1942. During the war he held various positions within the SS, including on the personal staff of Reichsführer-SS Heinrich Himmler, which Thomas Mann stated was the reason that several charges of pedophilia and abuse of children against Johst were dropped in the winter of 1944.

A former admirer of Thomas Mann, Johst suggested in a 1933 memo addressed to Heinrich Himmler that the author be arrested and imprisoned in Dachau concentration camp in revenge for the publication by Mann's son, Klaus, of Die Sammlung, an anti-Nazi emigre journal. Instead, the Nazis convinced multiple authors, including Thomas Mann and Stefan Zweig, to denounce the journal in exchange for avoiding a publication ban on their own literary works.

== Quotations ==
God the Father Himself did weave the splendor
with starry light and rays of the sun.
They however pushed the wreath of thorns
down into His hair and head and blood.
I weave for the child
only meadow herbs and larkspur.
Please, God, spare it the cross and thorns!
(in the anthology "Mother")

The harder this war is becoming and the longer it takes, the more do we experience the clear certainty of the true value of culture. The intellectual and spiritual forces reveal their solace, their splendor, and their grace. The outward life is constantly getting simpler and harder, burdened with the sacrifice of our time, but the inner life gets new, young and rich confirmation. Nothing can endanger this inner richness, on the contrary the more cruelly the outward world attacks spirit and soul, the more redeeming does the marvel of art prove to be." (June 1943, in a speech about Robert Schumann)

== Post-war ==
After the war Johst was interned, and on 7 July 1949 a Munich denazification tribunal classified him as a "fellow traveler". An appeal process ended in 1949 with his reclassification as a "main culprit" and a three-and-a-half-year labor camp sentence (the time Johst had already served). After his release from prison and further denazification proceedings in 1951, he was classified as “incriminated”. In 1955, Johst obtained an overturning of this decision and the termination of the proceedings at the public expense. He was thus effectively rehabilitated.

In the Soviet Occupation Zone, many of his works were placed on the banned books list, with the exception of Der Anfang. Roman (1917), Der Ausländer (1916), Ave Eva (1932), Lieder der Sehnsucht. Gedichte (1924), Der junge Mensch. Szenarium (1916), Mutter. Gedichte (1921), Mutter ohne Tod. Begegnung (1933), Stroh (1916), Die Stunde der Sterbenden (1914), Torheit einer Liebe. Roman (1931) and Wegwärts. Gedichte (1916).

In the Federal Republic of Germany, Johst could no longer gain publication as a writer but, after 1952, he wrote poems under the pseudonym "Odemar Oderich" for the Edeka supermarkets customer magazine, "Die kluge Hausfrau". Johst attempted to publish a book in 1953, which he had completed and revised at the end of 1943, but failed to find a publisher. He died on 23 November 1978 in an old people's home in Ruhpolding.

== Works ==
=== Novels, stories, novellas ===
- Der Anfang, 1917 [The Beginning]
- Der Kreuzweg, 1921 [Stations of the Cross]
- Consuela, 1924
- Consuela. Aus dem Tagebuch einer Spitzbergenfahrt, 1925 [Consuela: Excerpts From a Diary About a Trip to Spitsbergen]
- So gehen sie hin, 1930 [So They Vanish]
- Die Begegnung, 1930 [The Encounter]
- Die Torheit einer Liebe, 1931 [The Foolishness of a Love]
- Ave Maria, 1932
- Mutter ohne Tod. Die Begegnung, 1933 [Mother Without Death (i.e. undying). The encounter]
- Maske und Gesicht, 1935 [Mask and Face]
- Erzählungen, 1944 [Stories]
- Gesegnete Vergänglichkeit, 1955 [Blessed Mortality]

=== Drama ===
- Stunde der Sterbenden, 1914 [Hour of the Dying]
- Strof, 1915
- Der junge Mensch, 1916 [The Young Person]
- Der Ausländer, 1916 [The Foreigner]
- Stroh, 1916 [Straw]
- Der Einsame, 1917 [The Lonely]
- Der König, 1920 [The King]
- Propheten, 1922 [Prophets]
- Wechsler und Händler, 1923 [Money Changers and Traders]
- Die fröhliche Stadt, 1925 [The Happy City]
- Der Herr Monsieur, 1926 [Mister Monsieur]
- Thomas Paine, 1927
- Schlageter, 1933
- Fritz Todt. Requiem, 1943

=== Poetry ===
- Wegwärts, 1916 [Way-Bound]
- Rolandruf, 1918 [Roland's Call]
- Mutter, 1921 [Mother]
- Lieder der Sehnsucht, 1924 [Songs of Longing]
- Briefe und Gedichte von einer Reise durch Italien und durch die Wüste, 1926 [Letters and Poems About a Journey Through Italy and the Desert]
- Die Straße. Gedichte und Gesänge, 1941. [The Road: Poems and Songs.]
- Im Tal der Sterne. Liebeslieder. Mutterlieder, 1943. [In the Valley of Stars: Love Songs, Mother-Songs]

=== Essays, speeches, propaganda articles et al. ===
- Dramatisches Schaffen, 1922 [Dramatic Creativity]
- Wissen und Gewissen, 1924 [Knowledge and Conscience]
- Ich glaube! Bekenntnisse, 1928 [I believe! Declarations of Faith]
- Meine Erde heißt Deutschland, 1938 [My World is Called Germany]
- Ruf des Reiches, Echo des Volkes, 1940 [Call of the Reich, Echo of the People]
- Hanns Johst spricht zu dir (Sammelausgabe), 1942 [Hanns Johst Talks to You. Combined edition]
