= Mary Hottinger =

Scottish translator and editor

- Born: Mary Mackie; 20 June 1893; Liverpool, United Kingdom
- Died: 6 December 1978 (aged 85); Zürich, Switzerland
- Education: Master of Arts in French and German from Girton College Cambridge
- Occupations: translator and editor
- Known for: German to English translation of crime, ghost and horror stories. Also for non-fiction Escape to Life

Marie (Mary) Donald Hottinger, née Mackie (20 June 1893 – 6 December 1978), was a Scottish translator and editor. In the German-speaking world she is primarily known as the editor of various anthologies of crime, ghost and horror stories and translating non-fiction Escape to Life. Her three-volume standard work with the titles Mord, Mehr Morde and Even more Morde, has been reprinted often since the end of the 1950s, brought the Anglo-Saxon crime story and compilation of stories to a literary art form.

== Life ==
Mary Mackie was born on 20 June 1893 in Liverpool. Marie Mackie's parents, Customs Officer John Lindsay Mackie and his wife Louise Donald, were from Dundee, Scotland; her older brother Norman Lindsay Mackie (1891–1915) died in the Battle of Loos. From 1912 to 1915, Marie Mackie studied French and German at Girton College, Cambridge; She received her MA there in 1922. During the First World War, she was employed as a translator in the War Office from 1915 to 1917, then until 1919 as a private secretary in the Air Ministry. From 1924 to 1926 she taught French at Bedford College of the University of London.

On 24 December 1926, she married the Swiss lawyer Markus Heinrich Hottinger (1899–1982). The two had a daughter (Elspeth Donald Fässler, née Hottinger, 1930–2004) and their three grand children Peter Andreas Fässler (born 24 February 1958 in Zürich), Helen Beatrice Mauchle, (born 5 August 1961 in Zürich, deceased 27 August 2014 in Zürich) and Daniel Martin Fässler (born 1.5.1964 in Zürich). They lived in Zürich where Mary Hottinger worked as a lecturer in English language at the University of Zurich. Her first translation into English was published in 1926, a French Monteverdi biography by Henry Prunières. Then she switched to translations of German-speaking, mostly Swiss authors such as Gottfried Keller, Heinrich Wölfflin, Hugo von Hofmannsthal, Jacob Burckhardt and Emil Brunner. She wrote articles on English topics for the publications Neue Schweizer Rundschau and the Schweizer Annalen.

She became acquainted with the Mann family in the 1930s: she translated lectures into English for Thomas Mann and practiced with him before his first lecture tour through the United States, and she translated the non-fiction book Escape to Life for siblings Erika and Klaus Mann as German Culture in Exile (1939) into English.

During the Second World War, she worked as a spokesperson for English-language programs for the state radio's regional broadcaster Beromünster as part of the intellectual defence of the country, and she wrote about Swiss Neutrality.

After the Second World War, she was initially a lecturer in English literature at the Adult Education Center in Zürich, before concentrating on her work as an editor of anthologies from 1950, especially for the Diogenes Verlag Zürich.

In July 1957, she also gave English courses on Swiss radio.

She died on 6 December 1978 in Zumikon near Zürich.

== Works (selection) ==
Mary Hottinger has published numerous anthologies in Diogenes Verlag, Zurich. Many of her collections of stories were illustrated by Paul Flora:

- Standard work: Murder. Anglo-Saxon crime stories from Edgar Allan Poe to Agatha Christie, Zurich 1959, in which she defends the murder story genre
- Mehr Murder, 14th edition 1961, ISBN 3-257-20031-5
- Even more murders ,1967 and 2000 new edition, ISBN 3-257-20032-3
- The best English ghost stories (also under the title: Ghosts. English ghost stories from Daniel Defoe to Elizabeth Bowen ). Diogenes-Verlag, Zurich 1956.
- More ghosts. The best ghost stories from England, Scotland and Ireland. Diogenes-Verlag, Zürich 1978, ISBN 3-257-00974-7
- Six volumes with the title: The Connoisseur 1960s
- Family stories. For the literary lover, 1964 ISBN 3-257-21530-4
- Real murders. The Most Famous Criminal Cases and Trials from England, 1976, ISBN 3-257-00950-X
- The mockingbird. Fourteen short stories and twelve fantastic fables, new edition 1993, ISBN 3-257-20234-2
