= Israël Querido =

Dutch writer

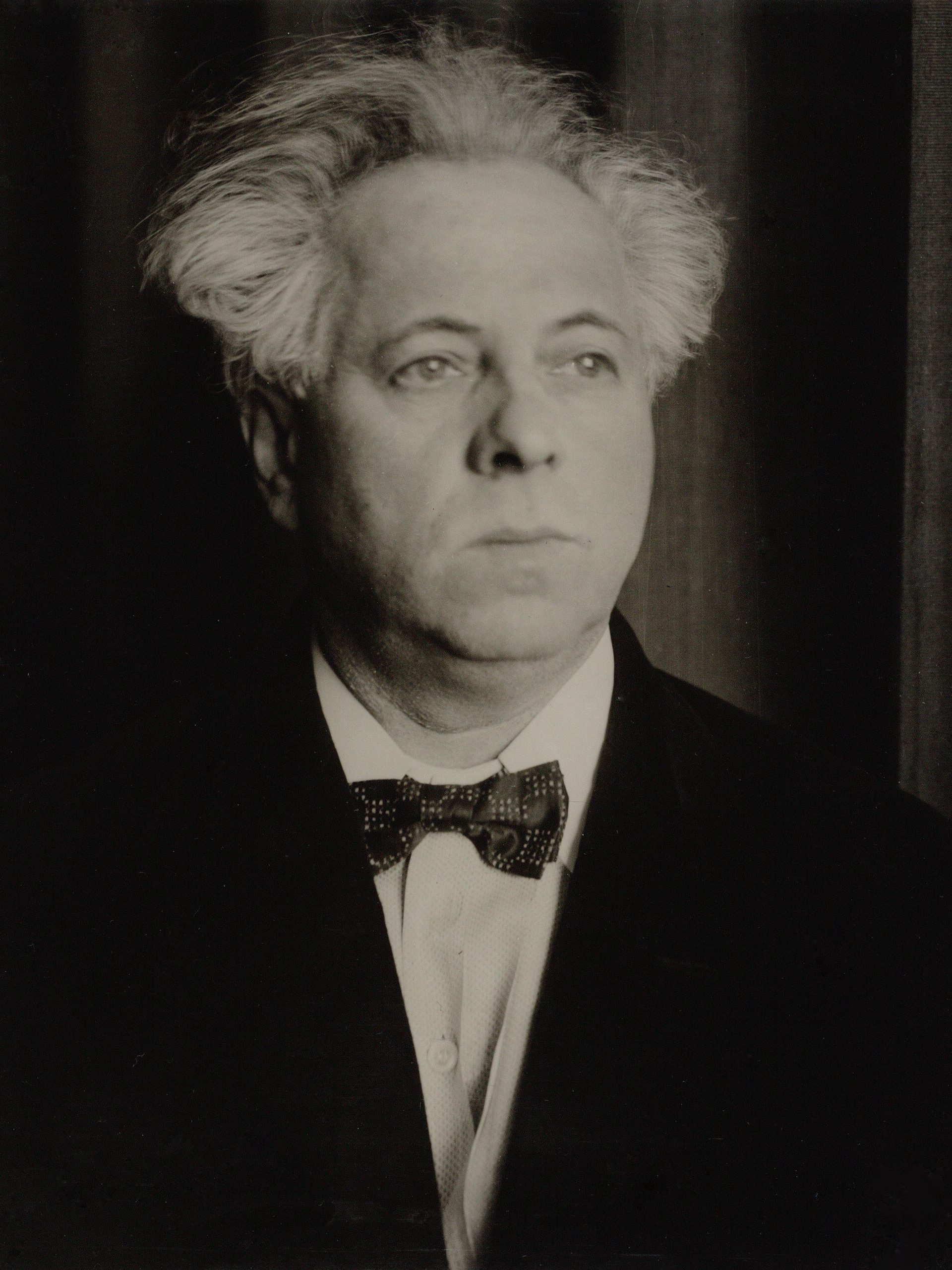
- Portrait photograph by Vereenigde Fotobureaux N.V.(August 5, 1932).
- Born: 1 October 1872; Amsterdam, Netherlands
- Died: 5 August 1932 (aged 59); Amsterdam, Netherlands
- Occupation: Writer
- Relatives: Emanuel Querido (brother)

Israël Querido (1 October 1872 – 5 August 1932) was a Dutch naturalist novelist. His novels are sympathetic to workers and the Socialist movement.

== Works ==
- Menschenwee, English translation Toil of Men

== Gallery ==
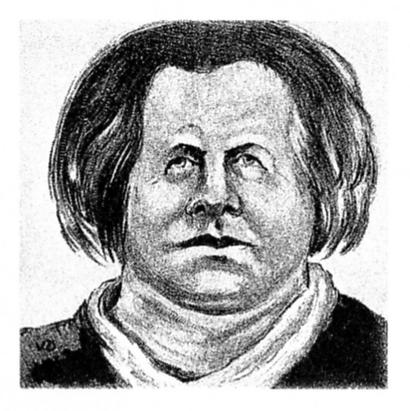
Caricature of Israël Querido by Theo van Doesburg, 1910.
