= Mephisto (1981 film) =

- Hungarian release poster
- Directed by: István Szabó
- Screenplay by: Péter Dobai; István Szabó
- Story by: Péter Dobai
- Based on: Mephisto by Klaus Mann
- Produced by: Manfred Durniok
- Starring: Klaus Maria Brandauer; Krystyna Janda; Ildikó Bánsági; Rolf Hoppe; Martin Hellberg
- Cinematography: Lajos Koltai
- Edited by: Zsuzsa Csákány
- Music by: Zdenko Tamássy
- Production company: Mafilm; Objektív Film; Manfred Durniok Filmproduktion; Hessischer Rundfunk; ORF
- Distributed by: Analysis Film Releasing Corporation (U.S.)
- Release dates: 11 February 1981 (Budapest premiere); 29 April 1981 (West Germany); 8 October 1981 (Hungary)
- Running time: 144 minutes
- Countries: Hungary; Austria; West Germany
- Language: German

Mephisto is a 1981 German-language political drama film co-written and directed by István Szabó, and based on the novel of the same name by Klaus Mann. It stars Klaus Maria Brandauer as a German stage actor (modelled on Gustaf Gründgens) who finds unexpected success and mixed blessings in the popularity of his performance in a Faustian play as the Nazis take power in pre-Second World War Germany. As his associates and friends flee or are forced underground by the Nazi regime, the popularity of his character ends up superseding his own existence, until he finds that his best performance is keeping up appearances for his Nazi patrons.

The film was a co-production of Hungarian, Austrian, and West German studios; starring German and Hungarian-speaking actors. It premiered in Budapest on 11 February 1981 and received widespread acclaim from critics, winning the Academy Award for Best Foreign-Language Film, the first Hungarian picture to do so. Brandauer's performance earned him many accolades, including BAFTA and German Film Award nominations and launched his film career.

== Plot ==
The film adapts the story of Mephistopheles and Doctor Faustus by revealing the costs to the main character Hendrik Höfgen as he abandons his conscience and continues to perform, ingratiating himself with the Nazi Party to keep his job and improve his social position.

Höfgen (modelled on German actor Gustaf Gründgens) craves center stage. The first third of the film follows his career as a frustrated, passionate actor slogging it out in provincial theaters, occasionally dancing and singing and doing parts in films to gain notice. He even founds a Bolshevik theater with a friend to generate more work, in the avant-garde period of the early 1930s, before the Nazis came to power. Initially, Hendrik is more successful in his social and love life than as an actor. Both strands unite when his new wife watches him play the ultimate role, Mephisto (the devil's agent in the Faustus play), just before the Nazi party comes to power in Germany.

While his wife, leading actors, and friends go into exile, or protest against the new regime, Hendrik returns to Germany lured by the promise of forgiveness for his communist theatre escapade and a desire to act in his native language. When the Nazi party offers to make him a star, he doesn't hesitate. Great roles and accolades quickly come his way, and Hendrik revels in his success. Hendrik reprises his greatest role as Mephisto and agrees to run the national theatre, working around the cultural restrictions and brutality of the Nazi government. He blithely overlooks the profound moral compromises of his situation, excusing himself by using the power of his close relationships with Nazi officials to help friends who would otherwise be targeted by the regime.

The plot's bitter irony is that the protagonist's fondest dream is to become Germany's greatest actor, playing Hamlet and Mephisto but to achieve this dream he sells his soul and realizes too late that he is not playing the role of Mephisto but that of Faustus; it is the Nazi leader with a major role in the film (modeled on Hermann Göring) who is the real Mephisto.

== Cast ==
- Klaus Maria Brandauer as Hendrik Hoefgen
- Krystyna Janda as Barbara Bruckner
- Ildikó Bánsági as Nicoletta von Niebuhr
- Rolf Hoppe as The General
- György Cserhalmi as Hans Miklas
- Karin Boyd as Juliette Martens
- Péter Andorai as Otto Ulrichs
- Christine Harbort as Lotte Lindenthal
- Martin Hellberg as Professor Reinhardt
- Tamás Major as Oskar Kroge
- Ildikó Kishonti as Dora Martin
- Mária Bisztrai as Motzné
- Sándor Lukács as Rolf Bonetti
- Ágnes Bánfalvy as Angelika Siebert
- Judit Hernádi as Rachel Mohrenwitz
- Vilmos Kun as stage manager
- István Szabó as man in tuxedo

== Reception ==
The film was the highest-grossing Hungarian film in the United States and Canada with a gross of $3.9 million.

=== Awards and nominations ===
Award	Category	Year	Nominee	Result
Academy Awards	Best Foreign-Language Film	1982	Hungary	Won
BAFTA Awards	Most Promising Newcomer to Leading Film Roles	1982	Klaus Maria Brandauer	Nominated
Bambi Award	Best Actor (National)	1983	Klaus Maria Brandauer	Won
Cannes Film Festival	Palme d'Or	1981	István Szabó	Nominated
Cannes Film Festival	Best Screenplay	1981	István Szabó	Won
Cannes Film Festival	FIPRESCI Prize	1981	István Szabó	Won
David di Donatello	Best Foreign Film	1982	István Szabó	Won
David di Donatello	Best Foreign Director	1982	István Szabó	Nominated
David di Donatello	Best Foreign Actor	1982	Klaus Maria Brandauer	Won
German Film Award	Best Actor in a Leading Role	1983	Klaus Maria Brandauer	Nominated
German Film Award	Best Actor in a Supporting Role	1983	Rolf Hoppe	Nominated
London Critics Circle Film Award	Foreign Language Film of the Year	1983	Mephisto	Won
National Board of Review	Best Foreign Language Film	1982	Mephisto	Won

Mephisto was the first Hungarian film to win the Foreign Language Oscar, and the only one until Son of Saul won in 2016. On review aggregator Rotten Tomatoes, the film holds an approval rating of 76% based on 25 reviews, with an average score of 7.40/10.

== See also ==
- List of submissions to the 54th Academy Awards for Best Foreign Language Film
- List of Hungarian submissions for the Academy Award for Best Foreign Language Film
