= Faust (1960 film) =

1960 film

- Directed by: Peter Gorski; Gustaf Gründgens (uncredited)
- Written by: Johann Wolfgang Goethe
- Produced by: Ilse Kubaschewski; Walter Traut
- Starring: Will Quadflieg
- Cinematography: Günther Anders
- Release date: 25 May 1960
- Running time: 128 minutes
- Country: West Germany
- Language: German

Faust is a 1960 West German theatrical film directed by Peter Gorski. It is based on Goethe's Faust (1808) and adapted from the theater production at the Deutsches Schauspielhaus in Hamburg. It stars Peter Gorski's adoptive father Gustaf Gründgens as Mephistopheles and Will Quadflieg as Faust, and was chosen as West Germany's official submission to the 33rd Academy Awards for Best Foreign Language Film, but did not receive a nomination. The film also won a Deutscher Filmpreis (transl.: German Movie Award) for an Outstanding Documentary or Cultural Film in 1961.

== Cast ==
- Will Quadflieg as Dr. Heinrich Faust / Dichter
- Gustaf Gründgens as Mephistopheles 'Mephisto' / Lustige Person
- Ella Büchi as Margarete "Gretchen"
- Elisabeth Flickenschildt as Marthe Schwerdtlein (as E. Flickenschildt)
- Hermann Schomberg as Theaterdirektor / Der HERR / Erdgeist (as H. Schomberg)
- Eduard Marks as Wagner
- Max Eckard as Valentin
- Uwe Friedrichsen as Schüler
- Heinz Reincke as Frosch
- Hans Irle as Altmayer
- Friedrich G. Beckhaus as Brander (as F. G. Beckhaus)
- Karl Heinz Wüpper as Siebel (as K. H. Wüpper)
- Heidi Leupolt as Lieschen
- Gustl Busch as Hexe
- Konrad Krauß as Engel Raphael

== See also ==
- List of submissions to the 33rd Academy Awards for Best Foreign Language Film
- List of German submissions for the Academy Award for Best Foreign Language Film
