= Die Sammlung =

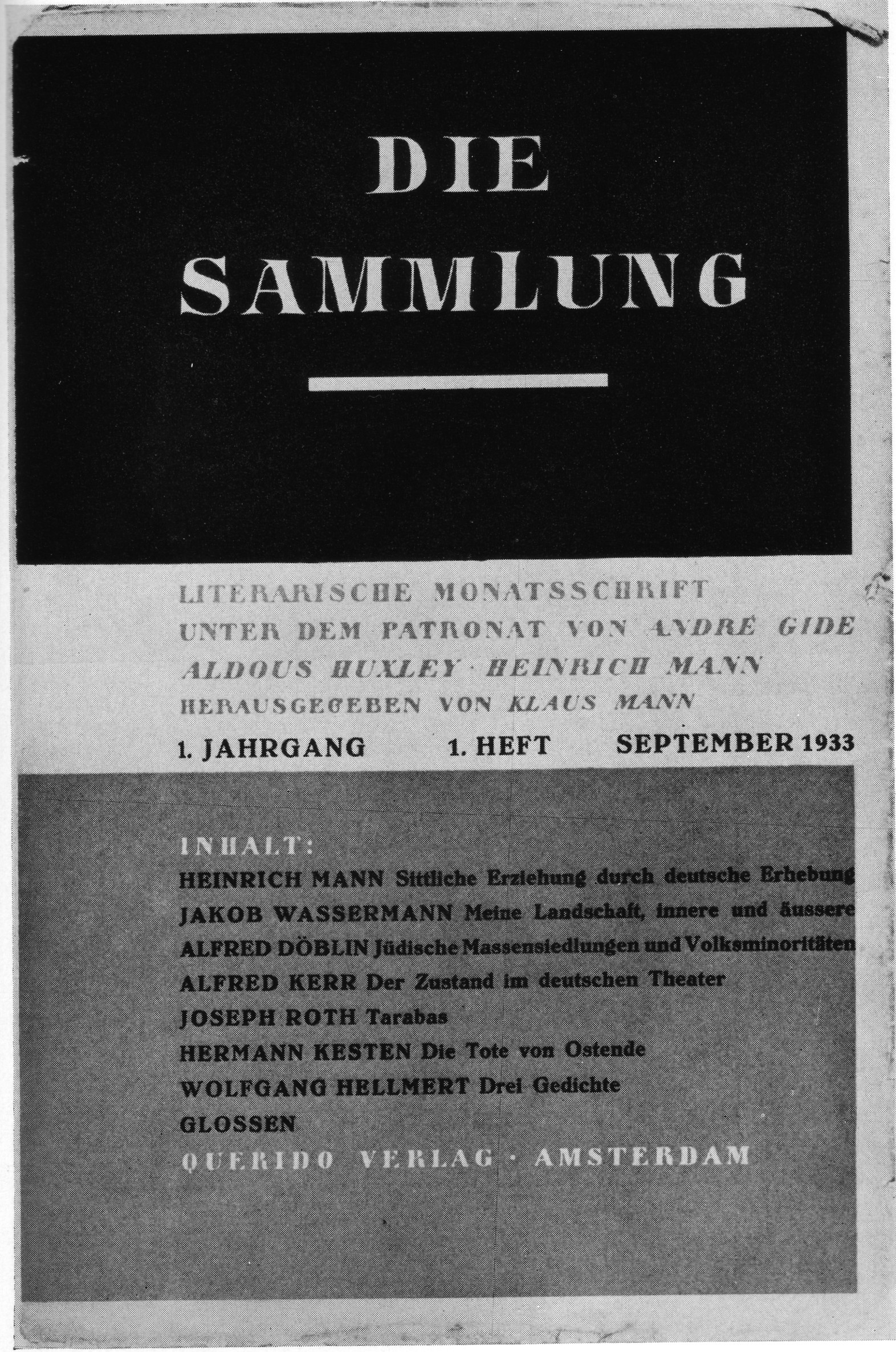
First cover of Die Sammlung. September 1933.

Die Sammlung (German for "The Collection") was a monthly literary magazine, first published in September 1933 in Amsterdam, and primarily affiliated with a number of influential German writers who fled from the Hitler regime during the first years of the establishment and consolidation of Nazi rule.

The magazine was primarily organized by writer Klaus Mann and Dutch publisher Querido Verlag's Emanuel Querido and Fritz Landshoff. Mann served as editor from 1933 to 1935; Die Sammlung's activity ceased with his departure in August 1935, and Mann left Europe for the United States.

Although published in German language, Die Sammlung was intended to be an international literary magazine. Besides featuring notable writers from the international community of German exiles worldwide, it included the work of non-German writers, such as the English novelist Aldous Huxley and French writer Jean Cocteau.

== Writers for Die Sammlung ==
- Johannes R. Becher
- Sybille Bedford
- Félix Bertaux
- Ernst Bloch
- Bertolt Brecht
- Max Brod
- Jean Cocteau
- Alfred Döblin
- Ilja Ehrenburg
- Albert Einstein
- Lion Feuchtwanger
- Bruno Frank
- A.M. Frey
- André Gide
- Oskar Maria Graf
- Thomas Theodor Heine
- Ernest Hemingway
- Stefan Heym
- Aldous Huxley
- Heinrich Eduard Jacob
- Alfred Kantorowicz
- Alfred Kerr
- Hermann Kesten
- Else Lasker-Schüler
- Golo Mann
- Heinrich Mann
- André Maurois
- Walter Mehring
- Walther Rode
- Joseph Roth
- Ernst Toller
- Leon Trotski
- Jakob Wassermann
- F.C. Weiskopf
- Arnold Zweig
- Hermynia zur Mühlen

== Literature ==
- Die Sammlung: Een bloemlezing uit het emigranten-maandblad dat van september 1933 tot augustus 1935 onder redactie van Klaus Mann bij Querido Verlag is verschenen, gekozen door Gerda Meijerink met een inleiding van F.H. Landshoff. Querido, Amsterdam, 1983. ISBN 90-214-7495-6
- Günter Hartung: Klaus Manns Zeitschrift "Die Sammlung" (Teil I). In: Weimarer Beiträge nr. 5, 1973, p. 37–59.
- Ulrike Spring: Verlagstätigkeit im niederländischen Exil 1933-1940. Diplomarbeit Universität Wien, 1994,. p. 25 e.v.
- Angela Huß-Michel: Literarische und politische Zeitschriften des Exils. Metzler, Stuttgart, 1987. ISBN 3-476-10238-6 / ISBN 978-3-476-10238-6
- Uwe Naumann: Ruhe gibt es nicht, bis zum Schluß. Klaus Mann (1906-1949). Bilder und Dokumente. Rowohlt, Reinbek, 2001, ISBN 978-3-499-23106-3
