= Peter Gorski =

German film director

- Born: 7 September 1921; Berlin, Germany
- Died: 3 March 2007 (aged 85)
- Occupation: Film director
- Years active: 1955 – 1961

Peter Gorski (7 September 1921 – 3 March 2007) was a German film director.

== Early life ==
Peter Gorski was born in Berlin, and was adopted in 1949 by the famous German actor Gustaf Gründgens.

== Career ==
Gorski started his career in 1955 as the assistant director for the film Ripening Youth.

In 1960 Gorski directed the film Faust, based on Goethe's Faust and adapted from the theater production at the Deutsches Schauspielhaus in Hamburg. The film starred his adoptive father Gustaf Gründgens as Mephistopheles, and was chosen as West Germany's official submission to the 33rd Academy Awards for Best Foreign Language Film, but did not manage to receive a nomination. The film also won Gorski a Deutscher Filmpreis for an Outstanding Documentary or Cultural Film in 1961.

== Lawsuit ==
In 1968, Peter Gorski, as Gustaf Gründgens’ sole heir, sued the Nymphenburger Verlagsbuchhandlung which had published the novel Mephisto, which was loosely based on the life of his adoptive father. The Federal Constitutional Court of Germany ruled that Gründgens’ personal freedom was more important than the freedom of art.

== Filmography ==
- Faust (1960), as director
- Reifende Jugend (1955), as assistant director
