= Gustaf Gründgens =

German actor (1899 – 1963)

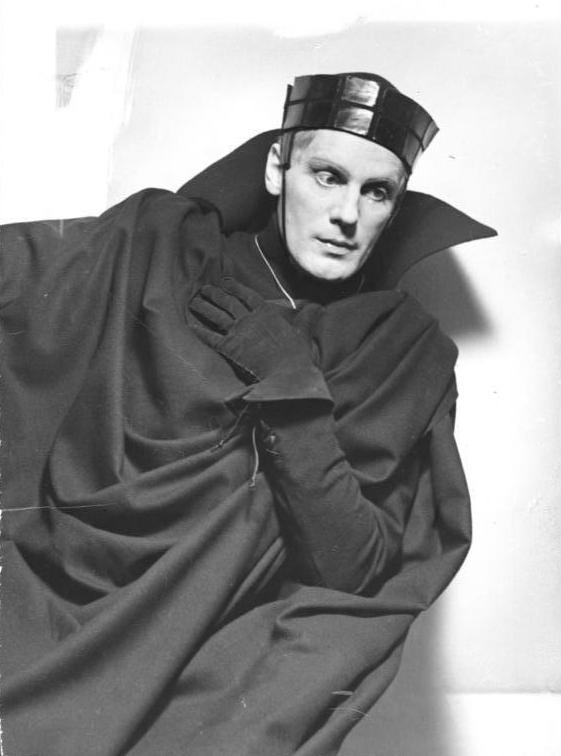
- Gründgens as Hamlet (1936)
- Born: Gustav Heinrich Arnold Gründgens; 22 December 1899; Düsseldorf, German Empire
- Died: 7 October 1963 (aged 63); Manila, Philippines
- Years active: 1920–1963
- Spouses: Erika Mann (m. 1926–1929); Marianne Hoppe (m. 1936–1946)
- Children: 1

Gustaf Gründgens (German: [ˈɡʊs.taf ˈɡʁʏnt.ɡəns]; 22 December 1899 – 7 October 1963), born Gustav Heinrich Arnold Gründgens, was one of Germany's most famous and influential actors of the 20th century, and artistic director of theatres in Berlin, Düsseldorf, and Hamburg. His career continued unimpeded through the years of the Nazi regime; the extent to which this can be considered as deliberate collaboration with the Nazis is hotly disputed.

His best-known roles were that of Mephistopheles in Goethe's Faust in 1960, and as "Der Schränker" (The Safecracker) who is the chief judge of the kangaroo court presiding over Hans Beckert (Peter Lorre) in Fritz Lang's M.

== Early life ==
Born in Düsseldorf, Gründgens attended the drama school of the Düsseldorfer Schauspielhaus after World War I and started his career at smaller theaters in Halberstadt, Kiel, and Berlin.

== Career ==
In 1923, he joined the Kammerspiele in Hamburg, where he changed his first name to Gustaf and appeared as a director for the first time. In 1925, Gründgens wrote to Klaus Mann to propose a Hamburg production of Mann’s play Anja and Esther. Mann agreed, and Anja and Esther was performed in Hamburg with Gründgens directing and playing the role of Jakob. Mann played the role of Kaspar, while his sister Erika and his fiancée Pamela Wedekind played the lead roles of Anja and Esther. The play marked the beginning of Gründgens’ collaborations with the Mann siblings and Wedekind, as well as the beginning of his romantic relationship with Klaus Mann.

In 1928, he moved back to Berlin to join the renowned ensemble of the Deutsches Theater under the director Max Reinhardt. Apart from spoken theatre, Gründgens also worked with Otto Klemperer at the Kroll Opera, as a cabaret artist and as a screen actor, most notably in Fritz Lang's 1931 film M, which significantly increased his popularity. From 1932 he was a member of the Prussian State Theatre ensemble, in which he first stood out in the role of Mephistopheles.

Gründgens' career continued after the Nazi party came to power. In October 1934, he became the Intendant, or artistic director, of the Prussian State Theatre and, on 6 May 1936, Prussian Minister President Hermann Göring appointed him to the recently reconstituted Prussian State Council. He also became a member of the Presidential Council of the Reichstheaterkammer (Theatre Chamber of the Reich), which was an institution of the Reichskulturkammer (Reich Chamber of Culture). In 1941, Gründgens starred in the propaganda film Ohm Krüger; he also played the title role in the fictional biographical film Friedemann Bach, which he also produced.

After Goebbels's total war speech on 18 February 1943, Gründgens volunteered for the Wehrmacht but was again recalled by Göring, who had his name added to the Gottbegnadeten list (Important Artist Exempt List).

== Post-war life ==
Imprisoned by the Soviet NKVD for 9 months in 1945 – 1946, Gründgens was released due to the intercession of the Communist actor Ernst Busch, whom Gründgens himself had saved from execution by the Nazis in 1943. During the denazification process, his statements helped to exonerate acting colleagues, including Göring's widow, Emmy, and Veit Harlan, director of the film Jud Süß.

Gründgens returned to the Deutsches Theater, later became Intendant of the Düsseldorfer Schauspielhaus, and from 1955 directed the Deutsches Schauspielhaus in Hamburg. He again performed as Mephistopheles; the 1960 film Faust, directed by his adoptive son Peter Gorski, was made with the Deutsches Schauspielhaus ensemble.

== Personal life ==
Gründgens became romantically involved with Klaus Mann while the two of them were performing in the Hamburg production of Mann's play Anja and Esther. In 1926, while in a relationship with Klaus, Gründgens married Klaus's sister Erika Mann, who was herself in a relationship with Klaus's fiancée Pamela Wedekind. By 1927, Erika and Gründgens were separated. They officially divorced in 1929, around the time that Gründgens's relationship with Klaus ended. Gründgens eventually became the basis of several characters in Klaus Mann's fiction, including the character of Gregor Gregori in Treffpunkt im Unendlichen and the character of Hendrik Höfgen in the infamous novel Mephisto.

From 1936 to 1946, Gründgens was married to the famous German actress Marianne Hoppe. He had a son with her in marriage, Benedikt Johann Percy Gründgens, born in 1946, whose biological father was the British journalist Ralph Izzard. Gründgens was widely known as bisexual. While some gays were persecuted and sent to concentration camps during the Third Reich, Gründgens was tolerated by the Nazi elites because of his high reputation as an actor.

== Death ==
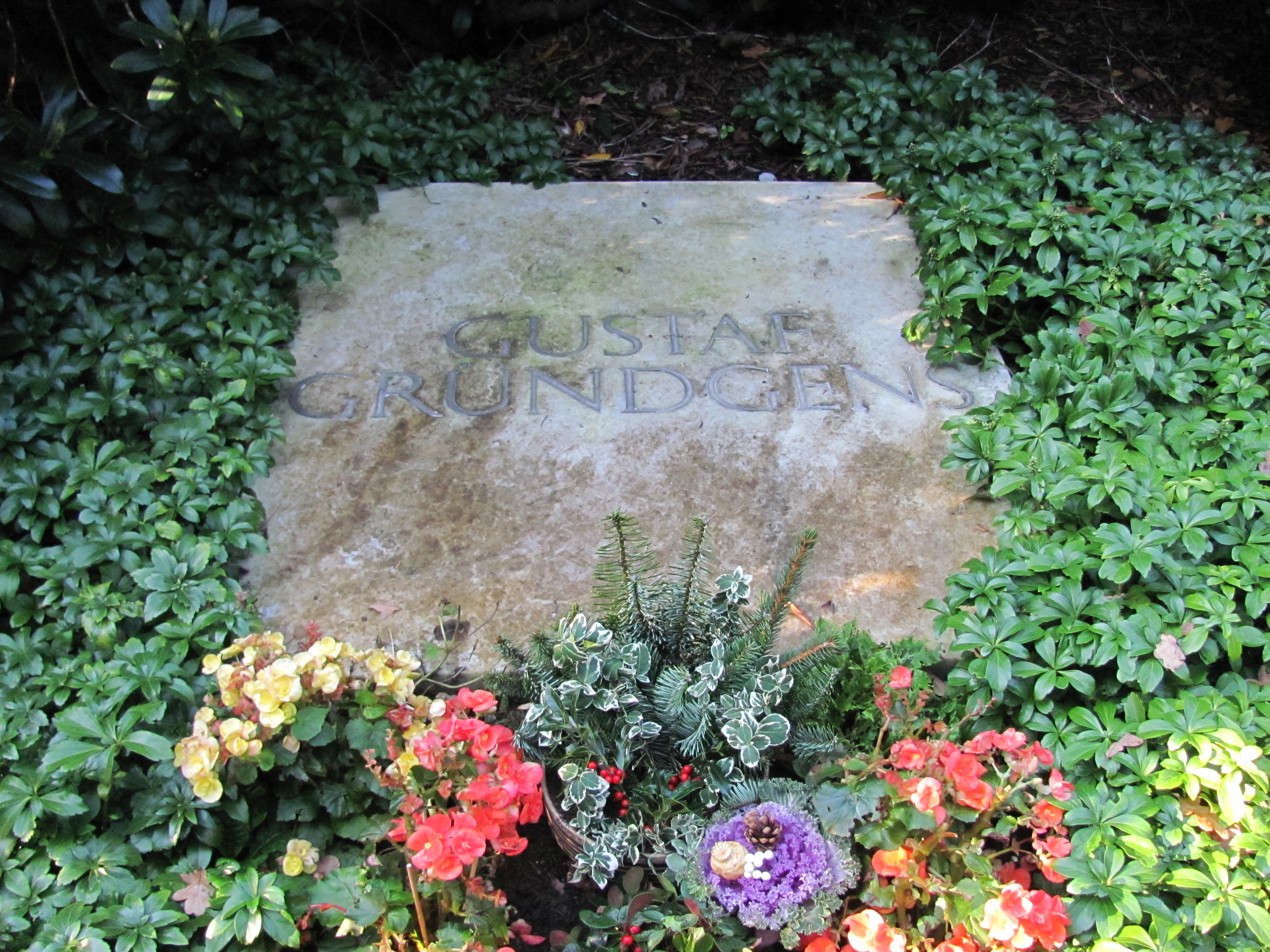
Grave of Gustaf Gründgens at the Ohlsdorf Cemetery in Hamburg.

On 7 October 1963, while traveling around the world, Gründgens died in Manila of an internal hemorrhage. It has never been ascertained whether or not he committed suicide by an overdose of sleeping pills. His last words, written on an envelope, were, "I believe that I took too many sleeping pills. I feel a little strange. Let me sleep long." He is buried at the Ohlsdorf Cemetery in Hamburg.

== Mephisto judgment ==
Posthumously, Gründgens was involved in one of the more famous literary cases in 20th-century Germany as the subject of the novel Mephisto by his former lover Klaus Mann, who had died in 1949. The novel, a thinly veiled account of Gründgens's life, portrayed its main character Hendrik Höfgen as having shady connections with the Nazi regime. Gründgens' adopted son and heir Peter Gorski, who had directed Faust, successfully sued the publisher on his late father's behalf in 1966. The judgment was upheld by the Federal Court of Justice in 1968.

In the time-consuming lawsuit, the controversy over libel and the freedom of fiction from censorship was finally decided by the Federal Constitutional Court in 1971. It ruled that Gründgens' post-mortem personality rights prevailed and upheld the prohibition imposed on the publisher. However, the novel met with no further protests when it was published again in 1981 by Rowohlt.

In 1981, the novel was made into the film Mephisto, directed by István Szabó, with Klaus Maria Brandauer in the role of Hendrik Höfgen. The film was a huge commercial and critical success, and won the Academy Award for Best Foreign Language Film in 1981.

== Filmography ==
=== Director ===
- A City Upside Down (also actor, 1933)
- The Grand Duke's Finances (1934)
- Kapriolen (also actor, 1937)
- The False Step (1939)
- Two Worlds (1940)
- Friedemann Bach (also actor, 1940)
- Faust (also actor, 1960, co-director Peter Gorski)

=== Actor ===
- Never Trust a Woman (1930) .... Jean
- Hocuspocus (1930) .... Public Prosecutor Dr. Wilke
- Va Banque (1930) .... Private detective John James Brown
- Fire in the Opera House (1930) .... Otto van Lingen
- Danton (1930) .... Robespierre
- M (1931) .... Der Schränker (The Safecracker)
- The Theft of the Mona Lisa (1931) .... Unbekannter
- Louise, Queen of Prussia (1931) .... King Frederick William III
- Yorck (1931) .... Hardenberg
- The Countess of Monte Cristo (1932) .... "The Baron", con artist
- Teilnehmer antwortet nicht (1932) .... Nikolai
- Liebelei (1933) .... Baron von Eggersdorff
- A Love Story (1933) .... Baron von Eggersdorf
- Happy Days in Aranjuez (1933) .... Alexander
- The Tunnel (1933) .... Woolf
- The Tunnel (1933, French version) .... Woolf
- Schwarzer Jäger Johanna (1934) .... Dr. Frost
- So Ended a Great Love (1934) .... Metternich
- The Legacy of Pretoria (1934) .... Eugen Schliebach
- Hundred Days (1935) .... Fouché
- Joan of Arc (1935) .... King Charles VII
- Pygmalion (1935) .... Professor Higgins
- A Woman of No Importance (1936) .... Lord Illingworth
- Capers (1937) .... Jack Warren
- Dance on the Volcano (1938) .... Jean-Gaspard Deburau
- Ohm Krüger (1941) .... Joseph Chamberlain
- Friedemann Bach (1941) .... Wilhelm Friedemann Bach
- Das Glas Wasser (1960) .... Sir Henry St John
- Faust (1960) .... Mephistopheles (final film role)

== See also ==
- Dohm–Mann family tree
