= Hans-Friedrich Blunck =

German jurist and writer (1888–1961)

Hans-Friedrich Blunck (3 September 1888 – 24 April 1961) was a German jurist and a writer. In the time of the Third Reich, he occupied various positions in Nazi cultural institutions.

== Life ==
A schoolteacher's son, Blunck was born in Altona near Hamburg and studied law at the University of Kiel and the Ruprecht Karl University of Heidelberg. At the latter university Blunck earned his PhD in 1912 with the dissertation Die Anfangsklage. Eine rechtsgeschichtliche Studie.

He was called into the forces in the First World War and served as an officer. Between 1920 and 1928, he worked as a government adviser, and from 1925 until 1928 as a syndic at the University of Hamburg.

Blunck lived from 1919 to 1924 in the Vierbergen district of Ahrensburg and later lived in Hoisdorf. In 1931, Blunck moved to his estate "Mölenhoff" in Grebin near Plön.

Between 1920 and 1940, Blunck published many novels and narratives, which are regarded in modern times as an attempt to establish the way to National Socialism. Blunck was especially interested in Nordic themes and Hanseatic history, which he framed with an emphasis on nationalistic aspects and the "völkisch" body of thought. His work includes conflicts with the Germanic pantheon, Norse sagas, fairy tales, ghost stories and Low Saxon poetry.

After Adolf Hitler and the Nazis seized power, Blunck was chosen on 7 June 1933 to be the second chairman of the Section for Poetry of the Prussian Academy of the Arts; the first chairman was Hanns Johst. Blunck had before this taken up one of the posts left open after all Jewish members had been excluded.

In 1933, Blunck was ordered to take the post of the first President of the Reich Literature Chamber (Reichsschrifttumskammer), whose job was to further the control and Gleichschaltung of literary production and distribution. Blunck signed the "vow of most faithful allegiance" to Adolf Hitler in the same year. However, by October 1935, he was removed from this position at Hans Hinkel's instigation. Unlike his successor Johst, Blunck was not yet a member of the NSDAP (Nazi Party) and spoke out against persecution of Jews who served in World War I. Blunck was named foreign representative of the Reich Literature Chamber and Honorary "Chairman by Seniority."

In 1936, Blunck founded the "Foundation of German Works Abroad" ("Stiftung Deutsches Auslandswerk"), whose goal was to propagate a positive picture of the Third Reich abroad. He joined the Nazi party in 1937.

Blunck became a member of the "Eutiner Dichterkreis", one of the most ardent Nazi poet societies in the Third Reich, whose patron was Hinrich Lohse (other members were Gunnar Gunnarsson, Helene Voigt-Diederichs, and Gustav Frenssen). Blunck was first president, and then from 1940 forward, he served as honorary president of the foundation, which in consultation with Reich ministries and NSDAP organizations coordinated foreign-based German companies' activities.

In 1952, Blunck published his memoirs under the title Unwegsame Zeiten ("Pathless Times"). He died on 24 April 1961.

== Quotations ==
Words in the Night (after WWI)
Many dead are travelling over Germany,
Many souls of unknown dead,
Full of worried questions, whether they've died in vain,
And asking if we commemorate them.
The answer is given – for the others are silent – by the poet
He mourns along the dark streets in the night
And erects memorials for the dead in his heart. –
Because he knows that many more will die,
Before the eternal Reich of all Germans is founded;
He turns his heart into a pledge and embraces the shadows,
Kisses their wounds and cares for their shot foreheads,
He protects them and wards off words of hate,
That the world spreads against the dead
And a beloved country that has lost its freedom.
Always will the poet sing of the right of all peoples
To weave their own fate.
Always will the poet demand the unity of all Germans,
His heart would die if he had no hope.
And you, my dead friends, you have not fallen in vain.
Today God is silent, but He will speak again,
He will crush the power of guns
He will blow away the might of the haters like the dust in a storm.
Hope, my brothers, and protect yourselves, commemorate the dead
In the depth of your glowing hearts and your faith.
(in the anthology "Ballads and Poems")

Poems of Worrying (1934)
I
You ask, my friend, where we see portentous signs,
– You dupe – as we are only wishing for justice
And peace, always peace?
The forebodings that awake us today
They are the same, that erstwhile raised their head –
Do you still remember – before the enormous Horror in the World.
The storms that aridly surround us today,
They are the same like … Lord, don't let it happen!
(in the anthology "Ballads and Poems")

Awakening
1. I gladly open my eyes.
In front of the morning window
A blackbird sings its greeting
Still tranquil and tender like a silvery stream
In the first outflow of Eastern light.
2. And my lips are laughing, because
My wife opens her eyelids
And still dreaming listens to the bird
And receives its happiness
And cares for her beloved one.
3. Now I take her hand
And I kiss it silently:
And we both listen, enraptured,
How it weaves the song from bough to bough
And we see the light flash through the window.
4. O, when one day we'll be departed,
This is how we'd like to be resurrected:
Aroused by the blackbird's song
Covered by the same blanket
And listening hand in hand.
(in the anthology "Ballads and Poems")

== Literature ==
- Jürgen Blunck: Bibliographie Hans Friedrich Blunck. Mit einem Anhang: Schriften von und über Barthold Blunck. Hamburg: Ges. zur Förderung d. Werkes von Hans Friedrich Blunck e. V. 1981. (= Jahrbuch der Gesellschaft zur Förderung des Werkes von Hans Friedrich Blunck; 1981)
- W. Scott Hoerle: Hans Friedrich Blunck. Poet and Nazi collaborator. 1888-1961. Oxford u.a.: Peter Lang. 2003. (= Studies in modern German literature; 97) ISBN 0-8204-6292-6
- Christian Jenssen: Hans Friedrich Blunck. Leben und Werk. Berlin: Buch- und Tiefdr.-Ges., Abt. Buchverl. 1935.
- Kai-Uwe Scholz: Chamäleon oder Die vielen Gesichter des Hans-Friedrich Blunck. Anpassungsstratregien eines prominenten NS-Kulturfunktionärs vor und nach 1945. In: Ludwig Fischer (Hrsg.): Dann waren die Sieger da. Studien zur literarischen Kultur in Hamburg 1945-1950. Hamburg: Dölling und Galitz. 1999.(= Schriftenreihe der Hamburgischen Kulturstiftung; 7) ISBN 3-930802-83-X
