= Klaus Mann =

German writer and dissident (1906–1949)

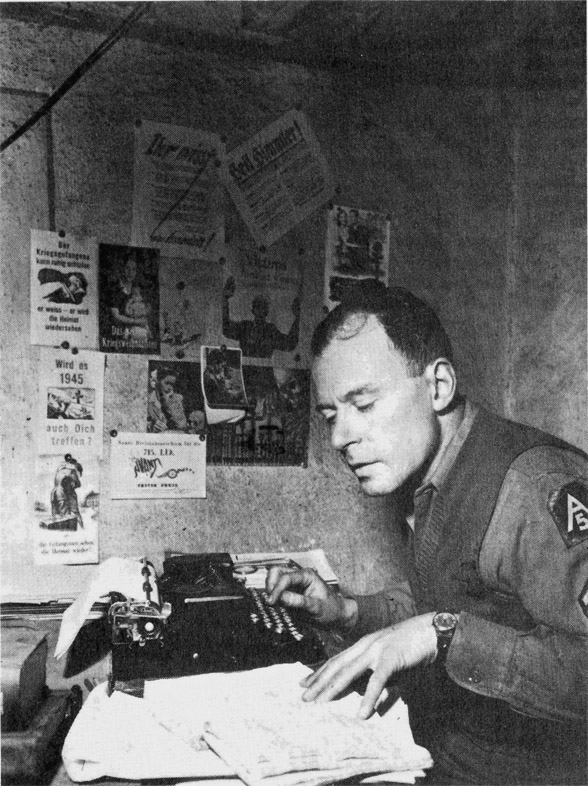
- Klaus Mann, Staff Sergeant 5th US Army, Italy 1944
- Born: 18 November 1906; Munich, Kingdom of Bavaria, German Empire
- Died: 21 May 1949 (aged 42); Cannes, France
- Occupations: Novelist; Essayist
- Relatives: Thomas Mann (father); Katia Pringsheim (mother)^{see full family tree}
- Writing career
- Genres: Socio-political fiction Satire

Klaus Heinrich Thomas Mann (18 November 1906 – 21 May 1949) was a German writer and anti-fascist activist. He was the son of Thomas Mann, a nephew of Heinrich Mann and brother of Erika Mann (with whom he maintained a lifelong close relationship) and Golo Mann.

He is best known for his 1936 novel, Mephisto, about an actor who sells his soul to the devil, by attaching his career to the rise of the Nazis. The book was initially banned in West Germany after the war because its protagonist was modeled on Mann's former lover Gustaf Gründgrens. Mephisto remained under legal taboo, even after Gründgrens death—on grounds of personality rights. It was made into a successful film of the same name in 1981.

Klaus moved to the United States to escape Nazism, and after training in counterintelligence as one of the Ritchie Boys, he served in Europe during World War II, becoming one of the first eye-witnesses to report on the horrors of the concentration camps. His books Escape to Life (co-written with his sister Erika Mann), and The Turning Point have attained importance as frequently cited primary documents of the experience of exile undergone by members of the German intelligentsia and arts community who fled the Third Reich.

Mann died in Cannes, France, on 21 May 1949 from an overdose of sleeping pills. Biographers have disagreed as to whether his death was accidental or suicidal, depressed by his treatment in the U.S. as a homosexual and alleged communist.

== Life and career ==
Born in Munich, Klaus Mann was the son of German writer Thomas Mann and Katia Pringsheim. His father was baptized as a Lutheran, while his mother was from a family of secular Jews. Due to his being the grandson of Júlia da Silva Bruhns, he was also of Portuguese-Indigenous Brazilian partial descent.

Mann described his early life as romantic, in beautiful upper-class surroundings (Je suis de mon temps. Kind dieser Zeit), but his homosexuality complicated his early adulthood, and he developed a difficult relationship with his father, who lived out his own homosexuality only in a platonic way and sublimated his experiences in his literature. Klaus Mann began writing short stories in 1924 and the following year became drama critic for a Berlin newspaper. His first literary works were published in 1925. His first novel The Pious Dance, Adventure Book of a Youth (1926) is openly set in Berlin's homosexual milieu.

In 1924 he had become engaged to his childhood friend Pamela Wedekind, the eldest daughter of the playwright Frank Wedekind, who was also a close friend of his sister Erika. The engagement was broken off in January 1928.

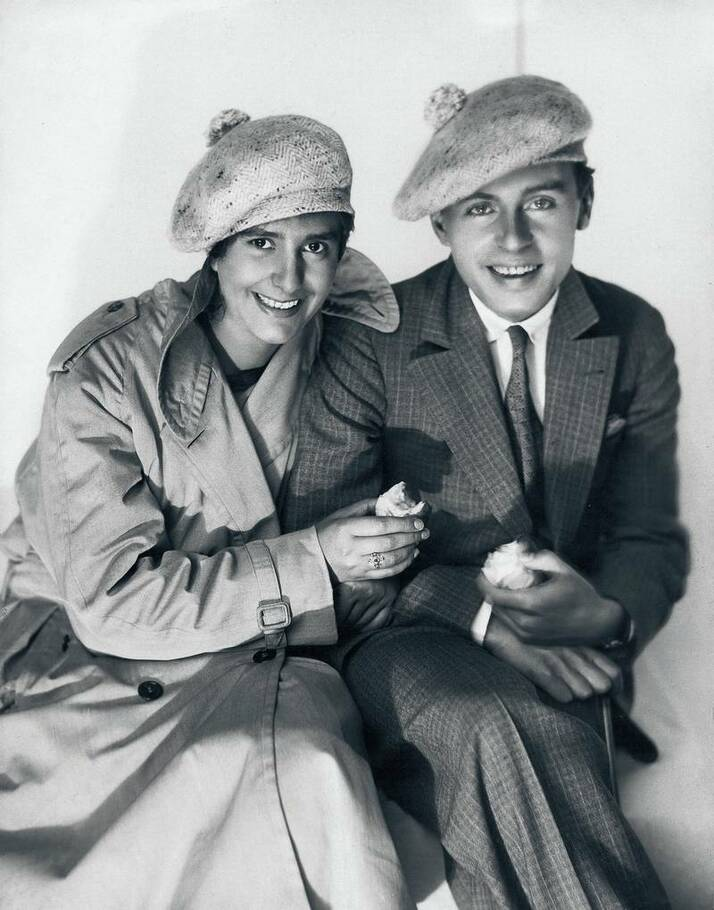
Klaus Mann (right) with his sister Erika in 1927

In 1927, after a short time in various schools, he traveled around the world with his sister Erika Mann, a year older than himself, visiting the U.S. In 1929, they reported on the trip in essays published as a collaborative travelogue entitled Rundherum. During his early travels often by car throughout Europe and North Africa as well as America and Asia, Erika took the wheel and determined the itinerary to compensate for Mann's inability to make personal and useful decisions. That assistance continued even into his later adulthood but could not save him from his own self-destructive behaviors and excessive drug use.

During the time Erika travelled with Klaus to North Africa in 1929, they met Annemarie Schwarzenbach, a Swiss writer and photographer, who remained close to them for the next few years. Klaus made several trips abroad with Annemarie, the final one to a Soviet writers' congress in Moscow in 1934. During this time and after direct contact with Russian authors and intellectuals, he initiated his critical thinking towards communist ideals and totalitarian ideologies.

=== Drug use ===
Since young adulthood, Klaus used drugs, mostly opiates, to which he later became heavily addicted. His diaries document an attempted morphine injection in 1933 when Hitler took power. Initially, the aspiring writer used opium, Eukodal and later heroin, possibly to increase his creative energy, as artists and intellectuals in literary circles often did at the time. He underwent drug detoxification in Budapest during his travels, and at the Kilchberg Sanatorium in Switzerland. After 1936, during his stay in New York his drug use and sexual adventures became unconstrained.

=== 1930s ===
In 1932 Klaus wrote the first part of his autobiography, which was well received until Hitler came to power. In 1933 Klaus participated with Erika in a political cabaret, called Die Pfeffermühle (The Pepper-Mill), which came to the attention of the Nazi regime. The play, which included a daring critique of Hitler, was first performed in Munich and subsequently in Zürich. To escape prosecution he left Germany in March 1933 for Paris, later visiting Amsterdam and Switzerland, where his family had a house.

The same year, Klaus Mann and Annemarie Schwarzenbach, together with Fritz Landshoff and Dutch publisher Emanuel Querido, founded Die Sammlung, a literary magazine, first published in September 1933 in Amsterdam. It was primarily affiliated with a number of influential German writers who fled from the Hitler regime during the first years of the establishment and consolidation of Nazi rule, but other internationally acclaimed authors such as Aldous Huxley and Heinrich Mann contributed essays and editorial work. The magazine was funded by Annemarie Schwarzenbach and Klaus's father Thomas Mann. Klaus served as editor-in-chief from 1933 to 1935, when Die Sammlung' ceased publication, in part due to disagreements between Klaus and his father, as well as other contributors, over frequent politically motivated content.

Klaus Mann not only played an important role in the consolidation of the German Exilliteratur but also communicated with authors who remained in Germany after 1933. In a letter exchange with Gottfried Benn, whose ambivalence towards Nazi rule was well known, Klaus expressed concern about Benn's continued membership in the national German academy of writers, pointing out the moral dilemma it posed, even urging him to leave the country to join the German intellectuals in exile. His work Escape to Life, co-authored by his sister Erika, who at the time was a successful writer for the BBC, was the culmination of his efforts to unite German intellectuals against the de-humanizing politics of the German National Socialists.

In 1933 Klaus Mann also made acquaintance with Julien Green, who was a successful French author, and engaged in the French Resistance. Green, who lived in America, attempted to rationalize his homosexual tendencies in the context of religion. Text published by Green indicated a shared sexual behavior with a preference for underaged boys. From the homosexual relationships Klaus experienced during his life, however, he tended to seek a bond with men equal to his age or older. In November 1934 Klaus was stripped of German citizenship by the Nazi regime. He became a Czechoslovak citizen.

=== Mephisto ===
In 1936, Klaus Mann wrote his most famous novel, Mephisto, which was first published in Amsterdam. The novel portrays actor Hendrik Höfgen's rise to nationwide fame in 1936, from humble beginnings in the Hamburger Künstlertheater (Hamburg Artists' Theater) in 1926. After fleeing to Paris on receiving news of the Nazis' rise to power, worried about his communist past, he is helped by a former co-actress from Hamburg, Angelika Siebert, who travels to Berlin to convince the girlfriend of a Luftwaffe general to have him pardoned. On returning to Berlin he quickly manages to win over Lotte and her general, and with his support has a wonderful career.

On obtaining the role of Mephisto in Faust Part One he realizes that he actually made a pact with evil (i.e. Nazism) and lost his humane values (even denouncing his mistress as "Black Venus"). There are situations where Höfgen tries to help his friends or tell the prime minister about concentration camp hardships, but he is always concerned not to lose his Nazi patrons.

The character of Hendrik Höfgen was based on his former brother-in-law, the actor Gustaf Gründgens. Gründgens' adopted son brought a legal case to have the novel banned after its first publication in West Germany in the early 1960s. After seven years of legal hearings, the West German Supreme Court upheld the ban, although it continued to be available in East Germany and abroad. The ban was lifted, and the novel published in West.

In 1981, the novel was made into a film co-written and directed by István Szabó, starring Klaus Maria Brandauer, which faithfully followed the plot of the novel. As Höfgen's associates and friends flee or are driven underground by the Nazi regime, the popularity of his character ends up superseding his own existence, until he finds that his best performance is keeping up appearances for his Nazi patrons. The novel was adapted into a play by Ariane Mnouchkine and later published in the 1994 collection; Plays by Mediterranean Women.

=== Move to the U.S. ===
In 1936, he moved to the United States, living in Princeton, New Jersey, and New York. In the summer of 1937, he met his partner for the rest of the year, Thomas Quinn Curtiss, who was later a longtime film and theater reviewer for Variety and the International Herald Tribune. Mann's novel Der Vulkan was published in 1939 at the onset of World War II, and was another attempt by him to portray not only Germans but other European exiles during that time. Despite considered one of his better novels, it never generated any significant sales and only was translated into French.

In 1940, Klaus Mann founded another literary magazine for German writers living in exile in the United States, Decision. It lasted for only a year, but consolidated American intellectual opposition to the war with Sherwood Anderson, W. Somerset Maugham, Vincent Sheean and Robert E. Sherwood onto its board of directors. At the time, he was living in February House, and his housemates W. H. Auden and Carson McCullers provided editorial and layout assistance. He eventually moved to his father's house in Pacific Palisades when he was unable to support himself financially.

Mann became a U.S. citizen in 1943. The process of naturalization was delayed because of an investigation the FBI conducted into Klaus Mann's political and sexual activities, as he was openly gay, but not an adherent of Marxist ideologies. Throughout his life in the U.S., he identified himself as a liberal antifascist and cosmopolitan.

=== World War II ===
In World War II, after training at Camp Ritchie, and becoming one of the Ritchie Boys, a US Army counterintelligence unit, he served as a staff sergeant of the 5th U.S. Army and the British Corps in Italy. Klaus was engaged in psychological warfare designing leaflets intended for German soldiers stationed in Italy and North Africa. In Italy, he was also involved with difficult interrogations of German POWs, including seasoned SS officers.

In his second 1942 autobiography (Der Wendepunkt, the Turning Point), he critically observed the segregation of white army personnel from their black counterparts at Camp Ritchie. In summer 1945, he was sent by units of the U.S. 5th Army and the British 8th Army to Germany. Klaus Mann, a German-American, used the publication Stars and Stripes to report from Postwar-Germany.

As he visited liberated concentration camps in official function, he was one of the first eye-witnesses to report on the horrors of mass extermination during Nazi rule in Germany. Audiovisual documents of his emotional reporting at these sites in the later 1940s became historical records and are still regarded today as a verification of these crimes against humanity.

== Death and legacy ==
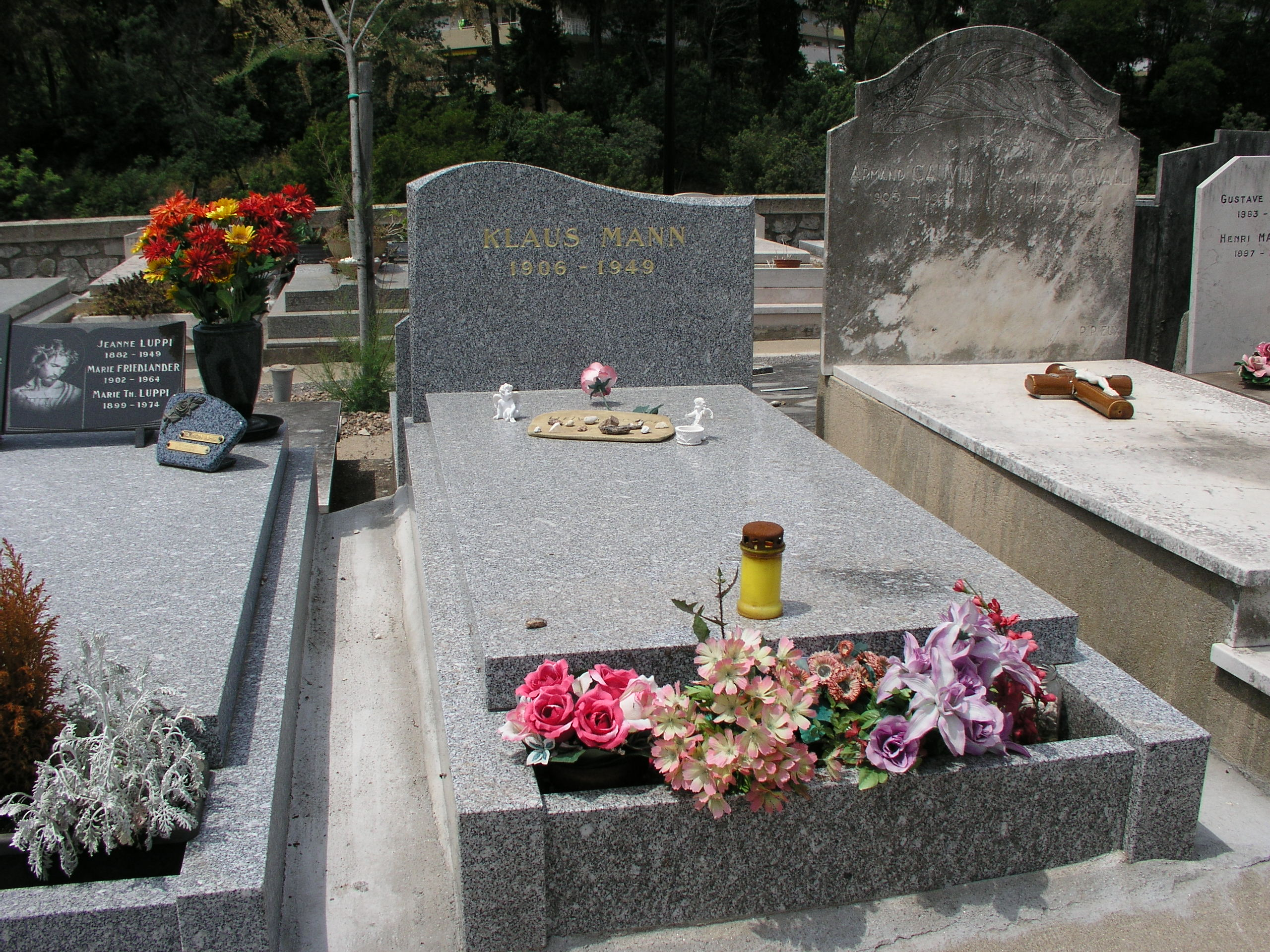
Klaus Mann's grave

Mann died in Cannes from an overdose of sleeping pills on 21 May 1949, following further drug treatment. His death is generally reported as a suicide, linked to financial pressures, opiate addiction, and disillusionment over his treatment by the U.S. as a homosexual, and supposed communist, but Mann's biographer Frederic Spotts argues that the engaged author's communications and attitude preceding his sudden overdose suggest accident rather than suicide. He was buried in Cannes at the Cimetière du Grand Jas.

A number of biographies of Klaus Mann appeared much later after his death in Cannes in 1949. Other than one German language author, Nicole Schaenzler, all biographies were written and edited by English or American contributors. Because he wrote frequent autobiographical content, a separation of his literary achievements, mostly unsuccessful during his time, from his life, are difficult. Mann remained active in literary circles, and his personal and spiritual connections with André Gide, and later examination of Gide in his work Avant la Lettre (1943) shed significant light on his time and himself.

Later historians celebrated Klaus Mann as a modern liberal or transnational who attempted to break down national boundaries, but Klaus's biographical notes reveal that he felt essentially German, and had positive memories of his upbringing in Bavaria. In a pursuit to describe post-war Germany after the destructions of World War II, he attempted to find his origins while collecting painful impressions from a Germany occupied by foreign military forces and impacted by the loss of its original borders.

In Paweł Pawlikowski's 2026 film Fatherland, Mann is played by August Diehl.

== Bibliography ==
=== Novels and autobiographies ===
- Der fromme Tanz, 1925
- Anja und Esther, 1925
- Kindernovelle, 1926 [published in the U.S. as The 5th Child, 1927]
- Revue zu Vieren, 1927
- Alexander, Roman der Utopie, 1929
- Auf der Suche nach einem Weg, 1931
- Kind dieser Zeit, 1932
- Treffpunkt im Unendlichen, 1932
- Journey into Freedom, 1934
- Symphonie Pathétique, 1935
- Mephisto, 1936
- Vergittertes Fenster, 1937
- Escape to Life, 1939 (with Erika Mann)
- Der Vulkan, 1939
- The Turning Point, 1942
- Avant la lettre, 1943
- André Gide and the Crisis of Modern Thought, 1943
- The Chaplain, 1945

=== Essays and travel reports ===
- Vor dem Leben, Erzählungen. Enoch Verlag, Hamburg 1925 (heute enthalten in Maskenscherz. Die frühen Erzählungen).
- Kindernovelle, Erzählung. Enoch, Hamburg 1926 (ebd.).
- Rundherum. Ein heiteres Reisebuch. (Mit Erika Mann). S. Fischer, Berlin 1929. Neuausgabe Rowohlt, Reinbek 1996, ISBN 3-499-13931-6.
- Abenteuer. Novellen. Reclam, Leipzig 1929.
- Auf der Suche nach einem Weg. Aufsätze. Transmare Verlag, Berlin 1931.
- Das Buch von der Riviera (Mit Erika Mann). aus der Reihe: Was nicht im „Baedeker“ steht, Band XII. Piper, München 1931. Neuausgabe Rowohlt, Reinbek 2003, ISBN 3-499-23667-2; Neuausgabe Kindler, Hamburg 2019, ISBN 978-3-463-40715-9.
- Die Sammlung. Literarische Monatsschrift. (Unter dem Patronat von André Gide, Aldous Huxley, Heinrich Mann herausgegeben von Klaus Mann.) Querido, Amsterdam. September 1933 – August 1935. Neuausgabe Rogner und Bernhard Verlag, München 1986 bei Zweitausendeins. Zwei Bände. ISBN 3-8077-0222-9.
- Vergittertes Fenster. Novelle (über die letzten Tage von Ludwig II. von Bayern). Querido Verlag, Amsterdam 1937; danach S. Fischer, Frankfurt am Main 1960 (heute enthalten in Speed. Die Erzählungen aus dem Exil.)
- Escape to Life Deutsche Kultur im Exil. (Zusammen mit Erika Mann). Houghton Mifflin, Boston 1939. Neuausgabe Rowohlt, Reinbek 1991, ISBN 3-499-13992-8.
- The Other Germany. (Zusammen mit Erika Mann), Modern Age, New York 1940 (Volltext im Internet Archive).
- Decision. A Review of Free Culture. Ed. by Klaus Mann. New York, Januar 1941 – Februar 1942.
- André Gide and the Crisis of Modern Thought. Creative Age, New York 1943 (dt.: Andre Gide und die Krise des modernen Denkens). Neuausgabe Rowohlt, Reinbek 1995, ISBN 3-499-15378-5.
- Heart of Europe. An Anthology of Creative Writing in Europe 1920–1940. Ed. by Hermann Kesten and Klaus Mann. L. B. Fischer, New York 1943.
- André Gide: Die Geschichte eines Europäers. Steinberg, Zürich 1948.
- Die Heimsuchung des europäischen Geistes. Essay 1948. Neuausgabe bei Transit Buchverlag 1993, ISBN 3-88747-082-6 (auch enthalten in Auf verlorenem Posten. S. 523–542).

== Film adaptations ==
- Mephisto, directed by István Szabó (1981, based on the novel Mephisto)
- Treffpunkt im Unendlichen, directed by Heinrich Breloer and Horst Königstein (1984, TV film, based on the novel Treffpunkt im Unendlichen)
- Flight North, directed by Ingemo Engström (1986, based on the novel Journey into Freedom)
- The Volcano, directed by Ottokar Runze (1999, based on the novel Der Vulkan)

== See also ==
- Dohm–Mann family tree
- Exilliteratur
