= Emanuel Querido =

Dutch publisher

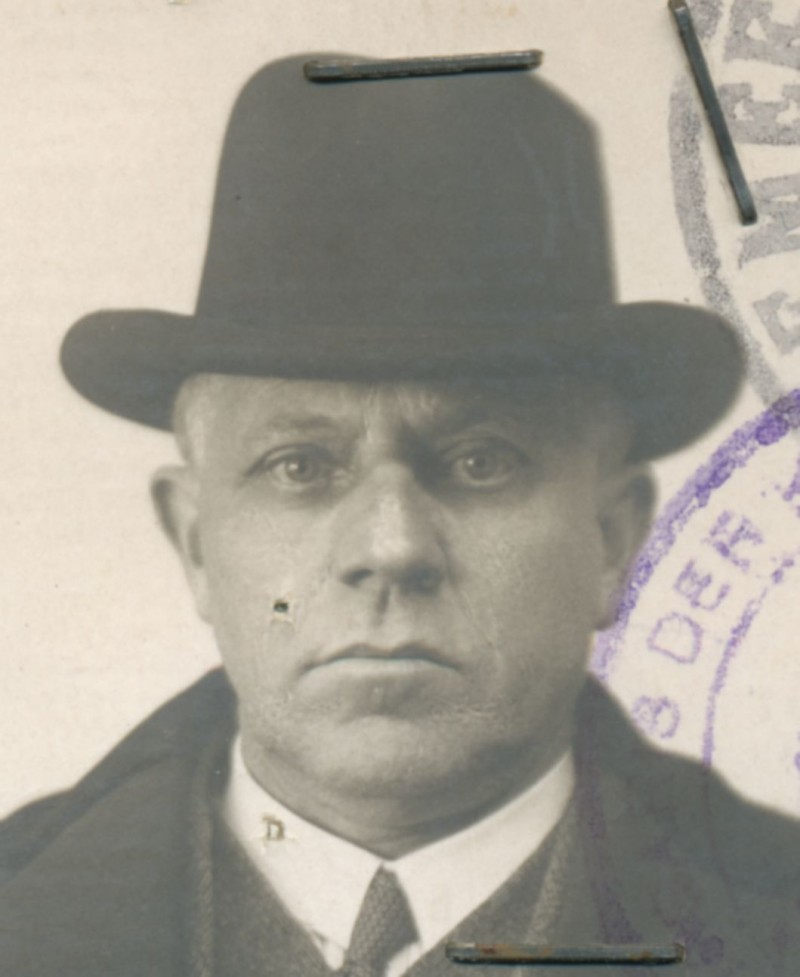
- Emanuel Querido
- Born: 6 August 1871; Amsterdam Netherlands
- Died: 23 July 1943 (aged 71); Sobibor
- Occupation: Publisher
- Relatives: Israël Querido (brother), Lotte Hellinga (granddaughter)

Emanuel Querido (6 August 1871 – 23 July 1943) was a successful Dutch publisher as the founder and owner of N.V. Em. Querido Uitgeversmaatschappij, which published Dutch titles, and of Querido Verlag, which published titles of German writers in exile from Nazi Germany. Although he and his wife were murdered by the Nazis in 1943, his company has gone on to publish several important authors.

== Professional biography ==
In 1898 he decided to found a bookstore at the Binnen-Amstel in Amsterdam. The bookstore became a popular meeting point for Dutch intellectuals. Querido had close connections with the diamond-polishing trade and supplied the library of the Dutch labour union for diamond workers. When the bookstore started to become profitable, he turned to publishing books, such as a translation of Schopenhauer's Parerga and Paralipomena. The bookstore became a dispatching bookstore/publisher in Bloemendaal in 1911, but business did not go well and in 1913 the shop had to close.

After several other jobs, Querido started publishing house in Amsterdam, under his own name, near the Keizersgracht, in 1915. Meanwhile, he also wrote a large, ten-part work titled Het geslacht der Santeljano's (The lineage of the Santeljanos), in which he criticized his brother, the writer Israël Querido, of whom Emanuel was envious.

In 1934, Querido started the De Salamander (The Salamander), the first Dutch true paperback series, a year before the first Penguin was published. It had been inspired by the Albatross book series published in Hamburg in 1932.

In 1933, after the rise of Hitler in Germany, many German authors of democratic attitude (and often Jewish) fled to the Netherlands. Because they could no longer publish in Germany, Querido offered to publish their works. He set up a separate publishing house for the political exiles under the German term, Querido Verlag, directed by the German publisher Fritz Landshoff. From 1933 to 1940, Landshoff published 110 works in German, so-called German exile literature. In this literature, the exiles fought against the Nazi regime. The exiles tried to convince their host countries and the whole world that the Nazi regime was at the point of starting a war to rule the whole world.

Only a few days after the occupation of Amsterdam, the Querido publishing house was struck by the German secret police Gestapo. They wanted to destroy this center of resistance. Querido had to leave the publishing business and with his wife retreated to the town of Laren where he had owned a house since 1929. The publishing company was put under the control of a national-socialist manager. Fritz Landshoff, a Jew and foe of the Nazis was by chance in London during the German advance to the Netherlands and succeeded in escaping to the United States. In 1943. Emanuel Querido and his wife went into hiding in the nearby town of Blaricum. They were betrayed and both fell into German hands and were murdered by the Nazis in Sobibor extermination camp on July 23, 1943.
