= List of German films of the 1970s =

This is a list of the most notable films produced in Cinema of Germany in the 1970s.

For an alphabetical list of articles on West German films see Category:West German films. For East German films made during the decade see List of East German films.

== 1970 ==
Title	Director	Cast	Genre	Notes
11 Uhr 20	Wolfgang Becker	Joachim Fuchsberger, Christiane Krüger, Gila von Weitershausen, Nadja Tiller, Götz George, Anthony Steel	Thriller	
Abel, wo ist dein Bruder?	Wolfgang Liebeneiner	Herbert Fleischmann, Max Eckard	Drama	
Abiturienten	Lutz Büscher	Rolf Becker, Tommi Piper, Wolfram Weniger, Christiane Hammacher, Dirk Dautzenberg, Gaby Dohm	Drama	
Abseits	Lutz Büscher	Ernst Jacobi, Karin Anselm, Dirk Dautzenberg	Drama	
Ach, so eine nette Person	Peter Schulze-Rohr	Elisabeth Schwarz, Sabine Eggerth, Brigitte Skay, Hellmut Lange, Gunnar Möller, Bruni Löbel	Drama	a.k.a. Girl with a Difference
All Backs Were Turned	Thomas Fantl	Heinz Bennent, Sonja Ziemann, Udo Vioff, Paul Smith	Drama	
Am Ziel aller Träume	Dietrich Haugk	Walter Giller, Joachim Teege, Gertraud Jesserer, Louise Martini	Comedy	
The American Soldier	Rainer Werner Fassbinder	Karl Scheydt, Rainer Werner Fassbinder, Elga Sorbas, Katrin Schaake, Margarethe von Trotta, Jan George, Ulli Lommel, Ingrid Caven	Crime drama	
And God Said to Cain	Antonio Margheriti	Klaus Kinski, Peter Carsten, Marcella Michelangeli	Western	Italian-West German co-production
Angelika Urban, Verkäuferin, verlobt	Helma Sanders-Brahms		Documentary	
Angels with Burnt Wings	Zbyněk Brynych	Susanne Uhlen, Jan Koester, Nadja Tiller, Werner Kreindl, Siegfried Rauch	Crime drama	a.k.a. Angels Who Burn Their Wings
The Arbor	Wolfgang Staudte	Walter Taub, Vadim Glowna, Ingrid van Bergen, Lieselotte Plauensteiner	Drama	a.k.a. Die Gartenlaube
Assignment: Terror	Hugo Fregonese, Tulio Demicheli	Karin Dor, Michael Rennie, Paul Naschy, Craig Hill	Horror	a.k.a. Dracula vs. Frankenstein. Spanish-Italian-West German co-production
Auftrag: Mord!	Dieter Lemmel	Reinhard Kolldehoff, Walter Wilz, Hannelore Schroth, Friedrich G. Beckhaus	Crime	
August, August, August	Jiří Bělka	Peter Striebeck, Ulli Philipp, Gert Westphal, Hans Helmut Dickow, Walter Richter	Drama	
August der Starke	Korbinian Köberle	Martin Hirthe, Beate Hasenau, Christine Wodetzky, Eva Pflug, Alexander May, Horst Tappert	Biography, Comedy, History	a.k.a. August der Starke – Ein ganzes Volk nennt ihn Papa
Auktion bei Gwendoline	Georg Wildhagen	Brigitte Horney, Fritz Tillmann, Hans Richter	Comedy	
Baal	Volker Schlöndorff	Rainer Werner Fassbinder, Margarethe von Trotta	Drama	
Bakke's Night of Fame	Gedeon Kovács	Christoph Bantzer, Pinkas Braun	Drama	a.k.a. Ende der Vorstellung 24 Uhr a.k.a. A Danish Gambit
Bambule	Eberhard Itzenplitz	Dagmar Biener, Antje Hagen, Barbara Schöne	Drama	
Die Barrikade	Carlheinz Caspari	Franz Gary, Werner Dahms	History	
Before Sunset	Oswald Döpke	Werner Hinz, Cordula Trantow, Herbert Fleischmann, Günter Strack	Drama	a.k.a. Before Sundown
The Beggar Student	Wilm ten Haaf	Ingeborg Hallstein, Curt Malm, Benno Kusche, Martha Mödl	Musical	
Die Beichte	Eberhard Itzenplitz	Bruno Dallansky	Drama	a.k.a. The Confession
Besuch gegen zehn	Ludwig Cremer	Peter Pasetti, Hans Korte	Thriller	a.k.a. Besuch gegen 10
Bend Sinister	Herbert Vesely	Helmut Käutner, Heinrich Schweiger, Christine Kaufmann, Henry van Lyck, Herbert Fleischmann	Science fiction	
Berlin Affair	David Lowell Rich	Darren McGavin, Fritz Weaver, Brian Kelly, Pascale Petit, Reinhard Kolldehoff	Thriller	American-West German co-production
A Big Grey-Blue Bird	Thomas Schamoni	Klaus Lemke, Umberto Orsini, Lukas Ammann, Sylvie Winter	Mystery, Science fiction	West German-Italian co-production
Biography: A Game	Rolf Hädrich	Paul Hubschmid, Ingmar Zeisberg	Drama	
The Bird with the Crystal Plumage	Dario Argento	Tony Musante, Eva Renzi, Suzy Kendall, Enrico Maria Salerno, Werner Peters, Mario Adorf	Mystery thriller	Italian-West German co-production
Blaue Blüten	Rudolf Jugert	Walter Schmidinger	Docudrama, History, Crime	Austrian-West German co-production
Blaues Wild	Peter Schulze-Rohr	Walter Kohut, Bruno Dallansky, Alfred Böhm, Alexander Trojan, Guido Wieland, Bruno Hübner, Bibiana Zeller	Drama	
Die blinden Ameisen	Oswald Döpke	Radovan Lukavský, Edith Heerdegen, Günter Strack, Herbert Fleischmann, Volkert Kraeft, Hannelore Elsner	Drama	a.k.a. Las ciegas hormigas a.k.a. The Blind Ants
The Bloody Judge	Jesús Franco	Christopher Lee, Maria Schell, Leo Genn, Margaret Lee, Hans Hass Jr., Peter Martell	Horror	Spanish-Italian-West German co-production
Der Bomberpilot	Werner Schroeter	Mascha Rabben, Magdalena Montezuma, Carla Egerer	War, Experimental	
Ein Bräutigam für Marcella	Tom Toelle	Günter Mack, Gert Westphal	Black comedy	
The Brutes	Roger Fritz	Helga Anders, Klaus Löwitsch, Arthur Brauss	Thriller	
Butterflies Don't Cry	Klaus Überall	Gaby Fuchs, Siegfried Wischnewski, Klaus Grünberg, Fritz Wepper	Drama	West German-Italian co-production
Cancer Ward	Heinz Schirk	Martin Benrath, Siegfried Lowitz, Vera Tschechowa	Drama	a.k.a. Krebsstation
The Cannibals	Reinhard Mieke	Wolfgang Kieling, Peter Vogel, Friedrich Joloff, Rudolf Wessely	War, Drama	
Das Chamäleon	Hans Stumpf	Herbert Fleischmann	Crime, History, Docudrama	a.k.a. Das Chamäleon – Die vielen Gesichter des Hochstaplers Gaston Oulmàn
Chariots of the Gods	Harald Reinl		Documentary	
Children of Mata Hari	Jean Delannoy	Stéphane Audran, Klaus Kinski, Lilli Palmer, Michel Constantin	Spy thriller	a.k.a. The Deathmakers. French-West German-Italian co-production
Christmas Not Just Once a Year	Vojtěch Jasný	Edith Heerdegen, René Deltgen, Gerd Baltus, Peter Ehrlich, Rolf Becker	Comedy	
The Circus Princess	Manfred R. Köhler	Rudolf Schock, Ingeborg Hallstein	Musical	
Claus Graf Stauffenberg	Rudolf Nussgruber	Horst Naumann, Wolfgang Büttner, Peter Schütte	War	
Clavigo	Marcel Ophuls, Fritz Kortner	Thomas Holtzmann, Rolf Boysen, Krista Keller, Friedhelm Ptok	Drama	
The Coffee Shop	Rainer Werner Fassbinder	Kurt Raab, Peer Raben, Harry Baer, Günther Kaufmann, Hanna Schygulla, Margit Carstensen, Ingrid Caven	Comedy	a.k.a. The Coffee House
Come to Vienna, I'll Show You Something!	Rolf Thiele	Tanja Gruber, Andrea Rau, Veit Relin, Tilo von Berlepsch	Sex comedy	Austrian-West German co-production
Compañeros	Sergio Corbucci	Franco Nero, Tomas Milian, Jack Palance, Fernando Rey, Iris Berben, Karin Schubert	Western	Italian-Spanish-West German co-production
The Conformist	Bernardo Bertolucci	Jean-Louis Trintignant, Stefania Sandrelli, Dominique Sanda	Drama	Italian-French-West German co-production
Count Dracula	Jesús Franco	Christopher Lee, Herbert Lom, Klaus Kinski	Horror	Spanish-Italian-West German-British co-production
The Dance of Death	Hans-Reinhard Müller	Will Quadflieg, Elfriede Kuzmany	Drama	a.k.a. Totentanz
Dark Spring	Ingemo Engström	Edda Köchl	Drama	
Deadlock	Roland Klick	Mario Adorf, Anthony Dawson, Marquard Bohm, Mascha Rabben	Crime	
Dear Friends	Karl Peter Biltz	Claus Biederstaedt, Ingeborg Schöner, Klaus Höhne, Wera Frydtberg, Xenia Pörtner, Ingrid Resch	Drama	a.k.a. Die lieben Freunde
Deep End	Jerzy Skolimowski	Jane Asher, John Moulder-Brown, Karl Michael Vogler	Drama	West German-British-American co-production
The Delegation	Rainer Erler	Walter Kohut	Science fiction	
Don't Fumble, Darling	May Spils	Werner Enke, Gila von Weitershausen, Henry van Lyck, Otto Sander, Benno Hoffmann	Comedy	
Dorian Gray	Massimo Dallamano	Helmut Berger, Richard Todd, Herbert Lom	Drama	Italian-West German co-production
Drei Tage bis Allerseelen	Herbert Ballmann	Siegfried Lowitz	Drama	a.k.a. 3 Tage bis Allerseelen
Drücker	Franz-Josef Spieker	Frithjof Vierock, Margarethe von Trotta, Renate Roland, Rosemarie Fendel, Traugott Buhre	Drama	
Emigration	Wilhelm Semmelroth	Hans Jaray	Drama	
Emilia Galotti	Ludwig Cremer	Sabine Sinjen, Johanna von Koczian, Horst Frank	Drama	
Erschwerte Möglichkeit der Konzentration	Michael Bünte	Martin Benrath, Louise Martini, Elisabeth Wiedemann, Luitgard Im	Comedy, Science fiction	a.k.a. The Increased Difficulty of Concentration
Even Dwarfs Started Small	Werner Herzog	Helmut Döring, Paul Glauer, Gisela Hertwig	Drama	
Der Fall Regine Krause	Jörg A. Eggers	Louise Martini, Walter Kohut, Gertraud Jesserer	Crime	Austrian-West German co-production
Der Fall Sorge	Hermann Kugelstadt	Arno Assmann, Franz Rudnick, Heinz Engelmann	Docudrama, Spy, War	
The Females	Zbyněk Brynych	Uschi Glas, Irina Demick, Françoise Fabian, Pascale Petit, George Ardisson, Alain Noury	Drama, Thriller	West German-French-Italian co-production
Ferdinand Graf von Zeppelin	Falk Harnack	Wolfgang Büttner, Gerd Baltus	Biography	a.k.a. Ferdinand Graf von Zeppelin – Stunde der Entscheidung
Die Feuerzangenbowle	Helmut Käutner	Walter Giller, Uschi Glas, Theo Lingen	Comedy	
First Love	Maximilian Schell	Dominique Sanda, John Moulder-Brown, Maximilian Schell, Valentina Cortese	Drama	Swiss-West German-Hungarian co-production
Flick-Flack	Gerd Winkler	Wolfram Weniger, Ilona Grübel, Gisela Trowe, Günter Strack	Comedy, Fantasy	
Floup	Hans Quest	Ilse Ritter, Herbert Fleischmann, Heinz Baumann, Paul Neuhaus	Crime comedy	a.k.a. Floup oder Der Hang zur Redlichkeit
Friede den Hütten! Krieg den Palästen!	Gerhard Klingenberg	Klaus Maria Brandauer, Siegfried Wischnewski	Biography, History	
Friedrich III	Rudolf Nussgruber	Heinz Weiss, Annemarie Düringer, Folker Bohnet, Ruth Maria Kubitschek	Biography, History	a.k.a. Friedrich III – Gestorben als Kaiser
Fröhliche Weihnachten	Wolf Dietrich	Sonja Ziemann, Karl Michael Vogler	Comedy	
The Garden of the Finzi-Continis	Vittorio De Sica	Dominique Sanda, Lino Capolicchio, Helmut Berger, Fabio Testi	Drama, War	Italian-West German co-production
Gedenktag	Dieter Wedel	Franz Rudnick, Claus Eberth, Gernot Endemann, Uwe Dallmeier, Evelyn Meyka, Franz Josef Steffens, Gottfried Kramer	Docudrama	
Gefährliche Neugier	Hans Dieter Schwarze	Claus Biederstaedt, Angela Winkler, Günter Strack	Crime	
General Oster	Rudolf Nussgruber	Wolfgang Preiss, Dieter Borsche	War	a.k.a. General Oster – Verräter oder Patriot?
Gentlemen in White Vests	Wolfgang Staudte	Martin Held, Heinz Erhardt, Mario Adorf, Hannelore Elsner, Walter Giller, Rudolf Platte, Herbert Fux	Crime comedy	
Gesellschaft für Miss Wright	Horst Flick	Gudrun Genest, Fred Haltiner	Thriller	
The Girls from Atlantis	Eckhart Schmidt	Isi ter Jung	Comedy, Science fiction	a.k.a. Atlantis – Ein Sommermärchen a.k.a. Männer sind zum Lieben da
Giuditta	Günther Hassert	Teresa Stratas, Rudolf Schock, Joachim Hansen	Musical	
Gneisenau	Werner Schlechte	Ullrich Haupt, Thomas Holtzmann, Hans Paetsch, Rudolf Fernau	History	a.k.a. Gneisenau – Die politische Auflehnung eines Soldaten
Gods of the Plague	Rainer Werner Fassbinder	Hanna Schygulla, Margarethe von Trotta, Harry Baer, Günther Kaufmann, Carla Egerer	Drama	
Grandstand for General Staff	Georg Wildhagen	Heinz Reincke, Attila Hörbiger, Karl Schönböck	Comedy	a.k.a. Der Feldherrnhügel
Eine große Familie	Peter Beauvais	Bruno Ganz, Kurt Ehrhardt, Gunnar Möller	Drama	
Die Hand im Mund	Joachim Roering	Alexander Hegarth	Comedy, Science fiction	
Hanna Lessing	Eberhard Itzenplitz	Barbara Klein, Lambert Hamel	Drama	
Das Haus Lunjowo	Franz Peter Wirth	Dieter Borsche, Wolfgang Preiss, Werner Kreindl	Docudrama, War	a.k.a. The House Lunjowo
Harvey	Kurt Wilhelm	Heinz Rühmann, Charles Régnier, Susi Nicoletti, Barbara Schöne, Gerlinde Locker, Herbert Bötticher	Comedy	a.k.a. Mein Freund Harvey
Die Herberge	Jiří Weiss	Wolfgang Reichmann, Gustav Knuth, Hans Korte	Drama	
Hier bin ich, mein Vater	Ludwig Cremer	Peter Vogel, Helmuth Lohner, Erika Pluhar	Drama	
Hotel by the Hour	Rolf Olsen	Curd Jürgens	Crime	
How Did a Nice Girl Like You Get Into This Business?	Will Tremper	Barbi Benton, Klaus Kinski, Broderick Crawford, Lionel Stander	Comedy	a.k.a. The Naughty Cheerleader. West German-Italian co-production
How to Get Rid of Your Husband	Jiří Weiss	Brigitte Grothum, Martin Hirthe, Günter Mack, Stefan Behrens	Black comedy	
How to Play the Seduction Game	Arthur Maria Rabenalt	Gundolf Willer, Yvonne ten Hoff, Véronique Vendell, Rudolf Schündler, Ralf Wolter	Sex comedy	a.k.a. Hilfe, mich liebt eine Jungfrau. West German-French co-production
Ich heiße Erwin und bin 17 Jahre	Erika Runge	Erwin Walther, Iris Hertisch, Theo Dahlke	Drama	
Ich töte	Tom Toelle	Volker Eckstein, Marianne Kehlau, Claus Hofer	Thriller	
Im Kreis	Tom Toelle	Heinz Bennent	Drama	
In the Name of Conscience	Rudolph Cartier	Heinrich Schweiger, Konrad Georg, Arthur Brauss	Cold War spy film	a.k.a. Recht auf Gewissen
Industrielandschaft mit Einzelhändlern	Egon Monk	Horst Tappert	Drama	
Invitation to the Castle	Helmut Käutner	Ilse Ritter, Heinz Ehrenfreund, Monika Peitsch, Karin Hübner	Comedy	a.k.a. Ring Round the Moon a.k.a. Die Kunst das Spiel zu spielen
Jana	Rolf Hädrich	Hermina Pipinić, Josif Tatić, Sven Lasta, Pero Kvrgić, Zvonimir Rogoz, Boris Buzančić, Vida Jerman	Drama	West German-Yugoslav co-production
Jill in the Box	Willy Bogner Jr.	Iris Berben, Jochen Richter	Comedy	a.k.a. Love 600
Jonas or the Artist at Work	Stanislav Barabáš	Walter Giller	Drama	
Jonathan	Hans W. Geißendörfer	Jürgen Jung, Oskar von Schab, Paul Albert Krumm, Ilona Grübel	Horror	
Jumbo	Michael Pfleghar	Eddie Constantine, Marty Feldman, Mario Adorf, Jean-Pierre Cassel	Comedy	West German-French-Austrian co-production
Kannibal Komix	George Moorse	Marianne Blomquist, Fee von Zitzewitz, Maria Litto, Jürgen Drews	Musical	a.k.a. Kannibal Komix oder Das Haus in Weiß
Der Kiosk	Frank Guthke	Peter Mosbacher, Corinne Hochwarter	Crime drama	
Klassenphoto	Eberhard Fechner		Documentary	a.k.a. Klassenfoto
Königin Christine	Ludwig Cremer	Elfriede Kuzmany, Kurt Ehrhardt, Volkert Kraeft, Sebastian Fischer, Kurt Meisel, Günter Strack	Drama, Biography	a.k.a. Kristina
Kudammgeschichten	Wolfgang Spier	Walter Bluhm, Rudolf Schündler, Henning Schlüter, Friedrich W. Bauschulte, Ilse Pagé	Comedy	a.k.a. Ku'damm-Geschichten
Let's Make a Dream	Marcel Ophuls	Sabine Sinjen, Ulli Lommel, Ernst Stankovski, Rolf Zacher	Comedy	West German-French co-production
The Lickerish Quartet	Radley Metzger	Frank Wolff, Erika Remberg, Silvana Venturelli, Paolo Turco	Softcore, Drama	Italian-American-West German co-production
Lieber Erwin	Thomas Fantl	Manfred Seipold, Maja Scholz, Verena Buss	Drama	
Love, Vampire Style	Helmut Förnbacher	Eva Renzi, Patrick Jordan, Amadeus August, Brigitte Skay, Herbert Fux, Barbara Valentin, Ralf Wolter	Comedy	a.k.a. The Amorous Adventures of a Young Postman
Ludwig van Beethoven – "In allem streng die Wahrheit"	Thomas Fantl	Karl Walter Diess, Carl Lange, Barbara Rütting, Konrad Georg, Christiane Krüger	Biography, Music	
Ein Mädchen	Rolf Busch	Heide Röschlein, Jörg Falkenstein	Drama	
Ein Mädchen für alles	Wolfgang Liebeneiner	Dagmar Biener, Peter Vogel, Diana Körner, Louise Martini, Benno Kusche, Catana Cayetano, Hildegard Krekel	Comedy	a.k.a. Monsieur Blaise
Das Mädchen meiner Träume	Rolf von Sydow	Christian Wolff, Franziska Oehme, Rolf Becker	Drama	a.k.a. Girl of My Dreams
Malatesta	Peter Lilienthal	Eddie Constantine, Christine Noonan, Vladimír Pucholt, Heathcote Williams, Wallas Eaton	Drama	Entered into the 1970 Cannes Film Festival
The Man Who Sold the Eiffel Tower	Michael Braun	Dietmar Schönherr, Monika Peitsch, Klaus Schwarzkopf, Agnes Windeck, Dunja Rajter, Wolfgang Völz	Crime comedy	
Mark of the Devil	Michael Armstrong	Herbert Lom, Udo Kier, Reggie Nalder, Herbert Fux	Horror	
The Marquise de Brinvilliers	Franz Peter Wirth	Heidelinde Weis, Sami Frey, Peter Pasetti, Pierre Brice, Jean-Roger Caussimon, Jean Martin, Félix Marten	Crime, History	a.k.a. Die Marquise von B. West German-French co-production
Maximilian von Mexiko	Günter Gräwert	Michael Heltau, Christine Wodetzky, Siegfried Wischnewski, Dieter Borsche	History, Biography	a.k.a. Maximilian of Mexico. West German-Austrian co-production
Mein schönes kurzes Leben	Klaus Lemke	Michael Schwankhart, Claudia Littmann	Drama	
Menschen	Fritz Umgelter	Ullrich Haupt, Günter Strack, Günter Mack	Drama	a.k.a. Creatures That Once Were Men
Millionen nach Maß	Erich Neureuther	Curd Jürgens, Ruth Maria Kubitschek, Werner Kreindl, Wolfgang Völz, Walter Rilla	Crime comedy	
Das Millionenspiel	Tom Toelle	Jörg Pleva, Dieter Thomas Heck, Dieter Hallervorden	Thriller, Science fiction	
The Minister of Police: Joseph Fouché	Günter Gräwert	Ferdy Mayne, Franz Rudnick, Wolfgang Büttner	Biography, History	
Mit sich allein	Michael Kehlmann	Hannes Messemer, Erika Pluhar, Eric Pohlmann	Drama	a.k.a. End of Story
Moonlighting Mistress	Wolfgang Becker	Ruth Maria Kubitschek, Harald Leipnitz, Véronique Vendell	Thriller	West German-French co-production
Morgen, ein Fenster zur Straße	Dieter Schlotterbeck	Rosemarie Fendel, Gisela Trowe, Wolfgang Wahl, Paul Edwin Roth, Ilona Grübel, Jan Koester	War	a.k.a. Demain, une fenêtre sur rue
Mourning Becomes Electra	Peter Beauvais	Andrea Jonasson, Karl Michael Vogler, Eva Katharina Schultz, Peter Pasetti, Joachim Ansorge	Drama	
Murder at the Vicarage	Hans Quest	Inge Langen, Heinz Bennent, Helga Anders, Herbert Mensching, Paul Neuhaus, Willy Semmelrogge	Crime	a.k.a. Mord im Pfarrhaus
Nachbarn	Theo Mezger	Werner Schumacher, Irmgard Riessen, Katharina Brauren, Herbert Steinmetz, Wolf Ackva, Andreas von der Meden	Drama	
Nachbarn sind zum Ärgern da	Peter Weck	Georg Thomalla, Uschi Glas, Fritz Wepper, Hans Korte, Eddi Arent	Comedy	
The Nail	Oswald Döpke	Andrea Jonasson, Herbert Fleischmann	Drama	
Neighbours	Hermann Kutscher	Ron Williams, Sonja Sutter	Drama	Austrian-West German co-production
The Niklashausen Journey	Rainer Werner Fassbinder	Michael König, Hanna Schygulla, Rainer Werner Fassbinder, Günther Kaufmann, Margit Carstensen, Kurt Raab	Drama	
o.k.	Michael Verhoeven	Eva Mattes, Hartmut Becker, Gustl Bayrhammer	War	Caused the cancellation of the 20th Berlin International Film Festival
Opfer	Pete Ariel	Vadim Glowna, Vera Tschechowa	Drama	
The Oppression of the Woman Is Especially Seen in the Attitude of the Women Themselves	Hellmuth Costard	Christoph Hemmerling	Drama	a.k.a. The Oppression of Woman Is Primarily Evident in the Behavior of Women Themselves
Pakbo	Volker Koch	Joachim Hansen, Werner Kreindl, Frederick Jaeger, Carla Egerer	Spy, War	
Peenemünde	Falk Harnack	Wolfgang Preiss, Dieter Kirchlechner, Karl John, Heinz Engelmann	War, Docudrama	
Perrak	Alfred Vohrer	Horst Tappert, Werner Peters, Erika Pluhar, Judy Winter, Arthur Brauss	Crime	a.k.a. Hard Women a.k.a. The Blonde Connection
Die Person	Wolfgang Staudte	Walter Taub, Horst Niendorf, Gert Haucke, Heinz Meier, Rainer Basedow, Walter Bluhm	Drama	
Photo Finish	Harry Meyen	Heinz Rühmann, Erika Pluhar, Rosemarie Fendel, Dagmar Altrichter, Hans Söhnker, Harry Meyen	Drama	a.k.a. Endspurt
The Pigeon Affair	Hans Dieter Schwarze	Günter Strack, Udo Vioff, Claus Biederstaedt, Angela Winkler	Comedy	a.k.a. Die Taubenaffäre
Piggies	Peter Zadek	Anton Diffring, Tankred Dorst, Gisela Fischer, Erich Fried, Dinah Hinz, Hannelore Hoger, Michael König, Robert Muller, Doris Schade	Comedy	
Pippi in the South Seas	Olle Hellbom	Inger Nilsson, Maria Persson, Pär Sundberg, Martin Ljung, Jarl Borssén, Wolfgang Völz	Family	Swedish-West German co-production
The Plebeians Rehearse the Uprising	Hans Lietzau	Rolf Henniger, Klaus Schwarzkopf, Ruth Hausmeister, Gisela Stein, Klaus Löwitsch	Drama	
The Portland Spy Ring	Helmut Ashley	Heinz Bennent, Siegfried Wischnewski, Barbara Schöne, Arnold Marquis, Karl-Heinz von Hassel	Docudrama, Cold War spy film	a.k.a. Der Portland-Ring
Die Preußen kommen	Danielo Devaux	Chariklia Baxevanos, Thomas Fritsch, Hans Clarin	Musical comedy	a.k.a. The Prussians Are Coming
The Priest of St. Pauli	Rolf Olsen	Curd Jürgens, Heinz Reincke	Drama	
Professor Blaise	Werner Schlechte	Peter Lühr, Iris Erdmann, Carl Lange, Hans Peter Hallwachs, Joachim Ansorge	Drama	a.k.a. Jazz
Red Sun	Rudolf Thome	Uschi Obermaier, Marquard Bohm, Diana Körner	Drama, Thriller	
Eine Rose für Jane	Hans W. Geißendörfer	Heinz Bennent, Martine Brochard, Eddie Constantine	Crime	
La salamandra del deserto	Riccardo Freda	Claudia Wedekind, Ettore Manni, Michael Maien, Yosef Shiloach	Drama	a.k.a. Tamar Wife of Er. Italian-Israeli-West German-Spanish co-production
San Domingo	Hans-Jürgen Syberberg	Michael König, Alice Ottawa	Drama	
Scheidung auf englisch	Ottokar Runze	Horst Bollmann, Inken Sommer, Fred Haltiner, Ingrid van Bergen	Comedy	a.k.a. Infidelity Took Place
Scher Dich zum Teufel, mein Engel	Wolfgang Liebeneiner	Reiner Schöne, Peter Pasetti, Karin Jacobsen, Barbara Schöne	Comedy	
Schlagzeilen über einen Mord	Heinz Schirk	Volkert Kraeft, Holger Hagen, Götz Burger, Günter Meisner	Crime drama	
Schulmädchen-Report	Ernst Hofbauer		Sex report film	First of a series of 13 films
Sessel zwischen den Stühlen	Fritz Umgelter	Günter Strack, Rolf Becker	Drama	
The Seven Year Itch	Franz Josef Wild	Gertraud Jesserer, Alexander Kerst, Luitgard Im, Eric Pohlmann	Comedy	a.k.a. Meine Frau erfährt kein Wort
Seventeen and Anxious	Zbyněk Brynych	Anne-Marie Kuster, Amadeus August, Nadja Tiller, Karl Michael Vogler, Siegfried Rauch	Drama	
Sex-Business: Made in Pasing	Hans-Jürgen Syberberg		Documentary	
The Sex Nest	Alfred Vohrer	Siegfried Schürenberg, Eddi Arent, Ann Smyrner, Mascha Gonska	Comedy	a.k.a. The Yellow House on Pinnasberg
The Shrike	Ludwig Cremer	Horst Frank, Krista Keller	Drama	a.k.a. Unter Kuratel
Sir Henri Deterding	Jürgen Goslar	Wolfgang Preiss, Werner Kreindl, Ernst Fritz Fürbringer, Konrad Georg	Biography, Docudrama	
Slap in the Face	Rolf Thiele	Curd Jürgens, Gila von Weitershausen	Comedy	
Ein Sonntag, ein Besuch	Hans Bachmüller	Rolf Henniger, Rosemarie Fendel	Drama	
Die Sprachlosen	Rainer Wolffhardt	Raimund Harmstorf, Wolf Roth, Elke Aberle	Drama	
The Square Root of Wonderful	Stephan Rinser	Herbert Fleischmann, Siegfried Rauch, Inge Langen, Ursula Dirichs	Drama	a.k.a. Zurück, wo ich begann
Stückgut	Gerd Winkler	Udo Vioff, Claudia Amm, Maria Becker	Comedy	
Student of the Bedroom	Michael Verhoeven	Christof Wackernagel, Gila von Weitershausen, Hannelore Elsner	Comedy	a.k.a. Der Bettenstudent
Summer in the City	Wim Wenders	Hanns Zischler	Drama	
Der Tag des Krähenflügels	Claus Peter Witt	O. W. Fischer, Klaus Maria Brandauer, Leonard Steckel	Drama	Austrian-West German co-production
Tage der Rache	Theo Mezger	Peer Schmidt, Günter Strack, Christa Berndl, Wolf Frees, Hans Jaray	Crime thriller	a.k.a. The Days of Vengeance
Tanker	Volker Vogeler	Katrin Schaake, Karl-Georg Saebisch, Ulrich Matschoss, Ivan Desny, Hans-Michael Rehberg	Drama	
Tartuffe	Otto Tausig	Klaus Schwarzkopf, Siegfried Lowitz, Ida Ehre, Karin Anselm, Michael Heltau	Comedy	
Teure Freunde	Károly Makk	Jiří Vala, Ralf Wolter, Claudia Wedekind, Corny Collins, Hildegard Krekel, Birke Bruck	Drama	a.k.a. Ivan Savvich Podzhabrin
That Can't Shake Our Willi!	Rolf Olsen	Heinz Erhardt, Ruth Stephan, Günther Jerschke	Comedy	
Time Is Running Out	Robert Ménégoz		Documentary	
Der Tod des Deputierten Jean Jaurès	Frank Guthke	Wolfgang Büttner, Ernst Jacobi, Konrad Georg	Docudrama	
Tod nach Mitternacht	Wilhelm Semmelroth	Martin Lüttge, Ruth Hausmeister, Horst Niendorf, Heinz Moog, Wolfgang Büttner, Ellen Schwiers	Crime	
Torment	Wilm ten Haaf	Werner Pochath, Alexander May, Carl Lange, Xenia Pörtner	Crime	a.k.a. Das Geständnis
Die U-2-Affäre	Rudolf Nussgruber	Michael Degen, Claudia Wedekind, Hellmut Lange	Docudrama	a.k.a. The U-2 Incident
Der Übergang über den Ebro	Armand Gatti	Hans Christian Blech, André Wilms	Drama	a.k.a. The Ebro Crossing
Under the Roofs of St. Pauli	Alfred Weidenmann	Jean-Claude Pascal, Werner Peters, Charles Régnier, Joseph Offenbach	Drama	
Unsere Pauker gehen in die Luft	Harald Vock	Wenche Myhre, Chris Roberts, Georg Thomalla	Musical comedy	
Unternehmer	Eberhard Itzenplitz	Jürgen Prochnow, Claudia Wedekind	Drama	
Unwichtiger Tag	Korbinian Köberle	Max Eckard, Ursula Burg, Ilona Grübel, Ilja Richter	Drama	
Varna	Volker Vogeler	Hans Dieter Schwarze, Irene Marhold	Drama	
The Vengeance of Dr. Mabuse	Jesús Franco	Jack Taylor, Fred Williams, Ewa Strömberg, Siegfried Lowitz	Horror	Spanish-West German co-production
We'll Take Care of the Teachers	Harald Reinl	Hansi Kraus, Theo Lingen, Rudolf Schündler, Uschi Glas, Fritz Wepper	Comedy	Die Lümmel von der ersten Bank film series
We Two	Ulrich Schamoni	Sabine Sinjen, Christoph Bantzer, Corny Collins	Drama	
Wer ist der nächste?	Arno Assmann	Helmuth Lohner, Albert Lieven, Klaus Schwarzkopf	Crime comedy	
Die Wesenacks	Werner Schlechte	Anita Kupsch, Peter Paul, Wolfgang Condrus, Ulrich Matthes	Drama	
What Is the Matter with Willi?	Werner Jacobs	Heinz Erhardt, Ralf Wolter, Ruth Stephan	Comedy	
When the Mad Aunts Arrive	Franz Josef Gottlieb	Rudi Carrell, Ilja Richter	Comedy	
When You're With Me	Franz Josef Gottlieb	Roy Black, Lex Barker, Zienia Merton, Eddi Arent	Musical	
Why Does Herr R. Run Amok?	Rainer Werner Fassbinder, Michael Fengler	Kurt Raab, Lilith Ungerer, Irm Hermann, Peer Raben, Franz Maron	Drama	Entered into the 20th Berlin International Film Festival
Wie ein Blitz	Rolf von Sydow	Paul Hubschmid, Ingmar Zeisberg, Horst Bollmann, Christine Kaufmann, Albert Lieven, Eva Pflug	Mystery thriller	a.k.a. Bat Out of Hell
Zwischenspiel	Heinz Schirk	Christine Ostermayer, Jürgen Goslar, Hans Jaray	Drama	a.k.a. Zwischenspiel oder La vie sentimentale

== 1971 ==
Title	Director	Cast	Genre	Notes
Die Ahnfrau	Peer Raben	Margit Carstensen, Rainer Werner Fassbinder, Rudolf Lenz, Wolfgang Kieling	Musical	a.k.a. Die Ahnfrau – Oratorium nach Franz Grillparzer
Die Anarchisten	Oswald Döpke	Günther Ungeheuer, Gerd Baltus, Günther Neutze	Thriller	a.k.a. The Exploding Azalea
Angel in the Pawnshop	Ludwig Cremer	Heinz Rühmann, Sabine Sinjen	Drama	a.k.a. Der Pfandleiher
Annemarie Lesser: Legend of a Spy	Rudolf Jugert	Christine Wodetzky, Pinkas Braun, Heinz Weiss, Helmut Förnbacher	Spy, War	
Apokal	Paul Anczykowski	Inken Sommer, Heinrich Giskes, Tilo Prückner	Drama	Entered into the 1971 Cannes Film Festival
Auf der grünen Wiese	Edwin Zbonek	Ruth Gassmann, Peter Minich, Ernst Stankovski	Musical	a.k.a. On the Green Meadow. Austrian-West German co-production
Aufstiegschancen	Thomas Fantl	Christa Berndl, Herbert Stass	Drama	
Aunt Trude from Buxtehude	Franz Josef Gottlieb	Rudi Carrell, Ilja Richter, Theo Lingen	Comedy	
Ball im Savoy	Eugen York	Klaus Löwitsch, Theo Lingen, Grit Boettcher, Wolfgang Völz, Lester Wilson, Charlie Rivel	Musical	a.k.a. Ball at the Savoy a.k.a. Ball at Savoy
The Bed Sausage	Rosa von Praunheim	Luzi Kryn, Dietmar Kracht	Comedy	
Bedenkzeit	Ludwig Cremer	Krista Keller, Peter Pasetti, Blandine Ebinger	Drama	
Besuch der Tochter	Claus Peter Witt	Susanne Beck, Dieter Borsche, Matthias Ponnier	Drama	
Beware of a Holy Whore	Rainer Werner Fassbinder	Lou Castel, Eddie Constantine, Hanna Schygulla, Marquard Bohm, Rainer Werner Fassbinder	Comedy-drama	
The Big Deal	Günter Gräwert	Siegfried Wischnewski, Heidy Bohlen, Walter Buschhoff, Benno Hoffmann, Dirk Dautzenberg	Drama	a.k.a. Das große Projekt
Blondie's Number One	Robert van Ackeren	Gabriele Lafari	Drama	
The Body in the Thames	Harald Philipp	Hansjörg Felmy, Uschi Glas, Werner Peters, Ivan Desny, Vadim Glowna, Petra Schürmann, Siegfried Schürenberg	Mystery thriller	a.k.a. Angels of Terror. Based on Edgar Wallace
The Bordello	Alfred Weidenmann	Karin Jacobsen, Herbert Fleischmann	Drama	
The Captain	Kurt Hoffmann	Heinz Rühmann, Horst Tappert, Günter Pfitzmann, Ernst Stankovski, Teri Tordai, Joseph Offenbach, Horst Janson, Hans Korte, Johanna Matz	Comedy	
Captain Typhoon	Rolf Olsen	Curd Jürgens, Johanna von Koczian, Heinz Reincke, Sieghardt Rupp, Herbert Fleischmann	Adventure	a.k.a. Nurses for Sale a.k.a. Captain Roughneck from St. Pauli
Carlos	Hans W. Geißendörfer	Bernhard Wicki, Gottfried John, Anna Karina, Geraldine Chaplin, Horst Frank, Thomas Hunter	Drama	
The Cat o' Nine Tails	Dario Argento	Karl Malden, Catherine Spaak, James Franciscus, Rada Rassimov, Horst Frank	Thriller	Italian-French-West German co-production
The Cell	Horst Bienek	Robert Naegele	Drama	
Change	Franz Peter Wirth	Hans Brenner, Monica Bleibtreu, Heinrich Schweiger, Rainer von Artenfels	Drama	
Chopin-Express	Michael Kehlmann	Hermann Treusch, Günter Mack, Gisela Stein, Otto Tausig, Klaus Schwarzkopf	Drama	
Chronicle of Current Events	Peter Handke	Rüdiger Vogler, Ulrich Gressieker	Drama	
The Constant Wife	Wolfgang Liebeneiner	Anaid Iplicjian, Werner Bruhns, Karl-Heinz Vosgerau, Diana Körner	Comedy	a.k.a. Eine konsequente Frau
Die Csárdásfürstin	Miklós Szinetár	Anna Moffo, René Kollo, Dagmar Koller, Karl Schönböck, Irén Psota	Musical	Hungarian-West German-Austrian co-production
Daughters of Darkness	Harry Kümel	Delphine Seyrig, Danielle Ouimet, John Karlen, Andrea Rau	Horror	Belgian-French-West German co-production
Davor	Peter Schulze-Rohr	Rolf Henniger, Henning Schlüter, Gerhard Dressel, Anita Lochner, Helga Roloff	Drama	Based on Local Anaesthetic
A Day Like Sunday	Rainer Wolffhardt	Lothar Blumhagen, Corny Collins	Drama	a.k.a. Ein Sonntag am See
The Deep Blue Sea	Hans-Reinhard Müller	Elfriede Kuzmany, Günther Ungeheuer, Albert Lieven	Drama	a.k.a. Tiefe blaue See
Delusions of Grandeur	Gérard Oury	Louis de Funès, Yves Montand, Karin Schubert	Comedy	French-Italian-Spanish-West German co-production
Desire Caught by the Tail	Veit Relin	Rolf Schult, Beatrice Richter, Ilse Pagé	Drama	a.k.a. Wie man Wünsche am Schwanz packt
The Devil Came from Akasava	Jesús Franco	Soledad Miranda, Fred Williams, Horst Tappert, Ewa Strömberg, Siegfried Schürenberg	Thriller	Spanish-West German co-production
The Devil in Love	Rainer Wolffhardt	Wolf Roth, Christiane Schröder, Birke Bruck	Fantasy	a.k.a. Der verliebte Teufel
Die sich Christen nennen	Theo Mezger	Rüdiger Kirschstein	Drama	
Das Ding an sich – und wie man es dreht	Falk Harnack	Horst Bollmann, Friedrich G. Beckhaus	Crime comedy	
Die Dollarprinzessin	Klaus Überall	Gabriele Jacoby, Regina Lemnitz, Gerhart Lippert, Stefan Behrens, Horst Niendorf, Ingrid van Bergen	Musical	
Dreht euch nicht um – der Golem geht rum	Peter Beauvais	Martin Benrath, Hannelore Elsner, Katrin Schaake, Francesca Tu, Christoph Bantzer, Werner Finck	Science fiction	
Dreißig Silberlinge	Ilo von Jankó	Agnes Fink	Drama	a.k.a. 30 Silberlinge a.k.a. Thirty Pieces of Silver a.k.a. 30 Pieces of Silver
Dying	Peter Beauvais	Heinz Ehrenfreund, Loni von Friedl	Drama	
The Eddie Chapman Story	Wolfgang Becker	Peter Vogel, Anita Höfer, Joseph Offenbach, Charles Régnier, Rainer Basedow, Friedrich Joloff	Biography, War, Spy	TV film. a.k.a. Kein Geldschrank geht von selber auf
Einer spinnt immer	Franz Antel	Georg Thomalla, Teri Tordai, Brigitte Grothum, Gunther Philipp, Herbert Fux	Comedy	West German-Austrian co-production
Einfach sterben...	Stanislav Barabáš	Hans Schweikart, Ernst Jacobi, Petra Peters, Gert Westphal	Biography	
Elsa Brändström	Fritz Umgelter	Renate Zillessen	Biography, War	
The End of a Mission	Hans Dieter Schwarze	Alois Maria Giani, Günter Strack, Wolfgang Büttner, Hanns Ernst Jäger, Angela Winkler	Comedy	a.k.a. Ende einer Dienstfahrt
Der Fall Eleni Voulgari	Nathan Jariv	Christine Buchegger, Klaus Schwarzkopf, Heinz Weiss, Iris Berben, Walter Kohut	Docudrama	
Ein Fall für Herrn Schmidt	Falk Harnack	Klaus Schwarzkopf, Martin Hirthe, Henning Schlüter, Heinz Meier, Werner Schumacher, Gaby Dohm	Crime	
Der Fall Jägerstätter	Axel Corti	Kurt Weinzierl, Guido Wieland, Wolfgang Kieling	Drama, War	Austrian-West German co-production
Das falsche Gewicht	Bernhard Wicki	Helmut Qualtinger, Evelyn Opela, Agnes Fink	Drama	a.k.a. False Weights a.k.a. The False Weight a.k.a. Weights and Measures
Fata Morgana	Werner Herzog	Wolfgang von Ungern-Sternberg, James William Gledhill, Eugen des Montagnes	Drama	
Das Feuerwerk	Kurt Wilhelm	Karin Anselm, Hanne Wieder, Paul Dahlke, Gerhard Riedmann, Bruno Dietrich, Beppo Brem	Musical comedy	a.k.a. Fireworks
Final Demand	Rolf von Sydow	Klaus Höhne, Heinz Baumann, Karl-Heinz Vosgerau	Drama	a.k.a. Letzte Mahnung
The Flower of Hawaii	Manfred R. Köhler	Uta Sax, Rex Gildo, Peter Fröhlich, Willy Millowitsch	Musical	
Flucht – Der Fall Münzenberg	Dieter Lemmel	Kurt Jaggberg, Günter Mack, Willy Semmelrogge	Biography, War	a.k.a. Willi Münzenberg
F.M.D. – Psychogramm eines Spielers	Georg Tressler	Paul Albert Krumm, Andrea Jonasson, Heidi Stroh, Ruth Maria Kubitschek	Biography	a.k.a. Fyodor Mikhailovich Dostoevsky: Psychogram of a Gambler
Forget What You Saw	Michael Kehlmann	Volkert Kraeft, Dirk Dautzenberg, Benno Sterzenbach, Hans Korte	Crime	a.k.a. Augenzeugen müssen blind sein
Die Frau ohne Kuß	Thomas Engel	Johanna von Koczian, Günter Pfitzmann, Karl Schönböck	Musical comedy	a.k.a. Die Frau ohne Kuss
Fräulein von Stradonitz in memoriam	Wolfgang Urchs	Giulia Follina, Herbert Herrmann	Mystery	
Freitags dienstbereit – Passage-Apotheke	Thomas Fantl	Joost Siedhoff, Rüdiger Bahr, Karin Kernke	Drama	
Furchtlose Flieger	Veith von Fürstenberg, Martin Müller, Max Zihlmann	Ferdinand Attems, Eike Gallwitz, Peter Berling, Barbara Valentin	Drama	
Die gefälschte Göttin	Helmut Käutner	Gracia-Maria Kaus, Joachim Ansorge, Jörg Pleva, Heinz Moog	Crime comedy	
The German Lesson	Peter Beauvais	Wolfgang Büttner, Arno Assmann, Jens Weisser, Andreas Poliza	Drama, War	
Geschäfte mit Plückhahn	Claus Peter Witt	Helmut Qualtinger	Drama	
Gestrickte Spuren	Georg Marischka	Christine Kaufmann, Kurt Nachmann, Alfred Böhm, Olga Chekhova, Petra Schürmann, Rudolf Prack, Hans Holt, Anaid Iplicjian	Mystery	Austrian-West German co-production
Goodbye Judas	Erich Neureuther	Vadim Glowna, Jürgen Prochnow, Hans Peter Hallwachs, Rakhchandeh Ettehad, Peter Ehrlich	Drama	a.k.a. Farewell, Judas
Der große Verhau	Alexander Kluge	Vinzenz Sterr, Maria Sterr, Hark Bohm, Hannelore Hoger	Science fiction	
Großstadtprärie	Claus Tinney	Harald Leipnitz, Günther Ungeheuer	Drama	a.k.a. Prairie in the City
Die Halsbandaffäre	Hermann Kugelstadt	Karin Hübner, Günther Neutze, Erich Auer	History	a.k.a. The Affair of the Diamond Necklace
Handicapped Future	Werner Herzog		Documentary	
Haytabo	Ulli Lommel	Eddie Constantine, Katrin Schaake, Rainer Langhans, Rainer Werner Fassbinder, Uschi Obermaier	Science fiction	
He Who Loves in a Glass House	Michael Verhoeven	Senta Berger, Hartmut Becker, Marianne Blomquist	Drama	Entered into the 21st Berlin International Film Festival
The Heart of the Matter	Oswald Döpke	Hans Christian Blech, Cordula Trantow, Inge Langen, Gerd Baltus, Herbert Fleischmann, Carl Lange, Wolf Frees	Drama	
Heißer Sand	Günter Gräwert	Joachim Fuchsberger, Sieghardt Rupp, Andrea Jonasson	Adventure	
Hilfe, die Verwandten kommen	Franz Josef Gottlieb	Uschi Glas, Horst Janson, Ilja Richter, Theo Lingen	Comedy	
The Hitler/Ludendorff Trial	Paul Verhoeven	Klaus Höhne, Alf Marholm, Ernst Fritz Fürbringer, Konrad Georg, Ulrich Beiger, Alexander Kerst	Docudrama	a.k.a. The Hitler/Ludendorff Trial: Scenes From a High Treason Trial in a Republic Without Republicans
Holidays in Tyrol	Harald Reinl	Uschi Glas, Hans-Jürgen Bäumler, Georg Thomalla	Comedy	
Hook, Line and Sinker	Rolf von Sydow	Klaus Höhne, Karin Eickelbaum, Gisela Trowe, Hans Jürgen Diedrich, Marius Müller-Westernhagen	Black comedy	a.k.a. La Femme, le Mari et la Mort oder Über die Schwierigkeiten, seinen Mann umzubringen
I Love You, I Kill You	Uwe Brandner	Rolf Becker, Hannes Fuchs, Marianne Blomquist, Monika Hansen	Science fiction	
Ich log die Wahrheit	Ludwig Cremer	Martin Lüttge, Klausjürgen Wussow, Walter Kohut, Inken Sommer, Kurt Ehrhardt	Comedy	Austrian-West German co-production
Ich werde dich töten, Wolf	Wolfgang Petersen	Ursula Sieg, Wolf Roth	Drama	a.k.a. I Will Kill You, Wolf
Intermezzo	Gedeon Kovács	Erika Pluhar, Peter Weck	Drama	a.k.a. Zwischenspiel
Interview mit Herbert K.	Herbert Ballmann	Herbert Stass	Drama, Crime	
It Is Not the Homosexual Who Is Perverse, But the Society in Which He Lives	Rosa von Praunheim	Bernd Feuerhelm, Berryt Bohlen, Ernst Kuchling	Drama	
Ivanov	Oswald Döpke	Herbert Fleischmann, Andrea Jonasson, Hannelore Elsner	Drama	a.k.a. Iwanow
Jaider, der einsame Jäger	Volker Vogeler	Gottfried John, Rolf Zacher, Arthur Brauss, Fred Stillkrauth, Louis Waldon	Crime	a.k.a. Jaider, the Lonely Hunter. Entered into the 21st Berlin International Film Festival
Jailbreak in Hamburg	Wolfgang Staudte	Horst Frank, Christiane Krüger, Heinz Reincke, Klaus Schwarzkopf	Crime thriller	a.k.a. Fluchtweg St. Pauli – Großalarm für die Davidswache
Jakob von Gunten	Peter Lilienthal	Sebastian Bleisch, Hanna Schygulla, Alexander May, Peter Kern	Drama	
Jürgen Roland’s St. Pauli-Report	Jürgen Roland	Helen Vita, Günther Jerschke, Hans Putz, Rudolf Schündler	Anthology, Docudrama	
Karpfs Karriere	Bernhard Wicki	Martin Benrath, Agnes Fink	Drama	
Kassensturz	Korbinian Köberle	Karin Hübner	Crime	a.k.a. The Banklady
Kennen Sie Georg Linke?	Rolf Hädrich	Oswald Meichsner, Lilo Pfitzmann	Drama	
Kolibri	Nathan Jariv	Klaus Schwarzkopf, Lil Dagover, Ingeborg Schöner	Crime	
Ladies in Retirement	Karlheinz Bieber	Lil Dagover, Brigitte Horney	Black comedy	a.k.a. Paradies der alten Damen
Land of Silence and Darkness	Werner Herzog		Documentary	
Lenz	George Moorse	Michael König, Louis Waldon	Biography	
Liliom	Otto Schenk	Helmuth Lohner, Gertraud Jesserer	Drama	
The Long Swift Sword of Siegfried	Adrian Hoven	Raimund Harmstorf, Sybil Danning, Heidy Bohlen	Sex comedy, Fantasy	
Love Is as Beautiful as Love	Klaus Lemke	Sylvie Winter, Rolf Zacher, Marquard Bohm	Comedy	
Love Is Only a Word	Alfred Vohrer	Judy Winter, Malte Thorsten, Herbert Fleischmann	Drama	a.k.a. Love Is Just a Word
The Love Keys	Rolf Thiele	Horst Tappert, Heidi Hansen, Uwe Friedrichsen, Siegfried Schürenberg	Comedy	a.k.a. Rosy und der Herr aus Bonn a.k.a. Bleib sauber, Liebling!
The Mad Aunts Strike Out	Franz Josef Gottlieb	Rudi Carrell, Ilja Richter, Theo Lingen	Comedy	
Maestro der Revolution?	Ulrich Erfurth	Karl Michael Vogler, Gerlinde Locker, Arno Assmann, Uta Sax, Siegfried Wischnewski, Ulrich Matschoss, Martin Hirthe	Biography, Music	a.k.a. Giuseppe Verdi – Maestro der Revolution?
Magic Afternoon	Wolfgang Bauer	Elga Sorbas, Rainer von Artenfels	Drama	
Making of a Prostitute	Gustav Ehmck	Gerhild Berktold	Drama	a.k.a. Die Spalte
The Man from London	Heinz Schirk	Jean Servais	Thriller	
Männer aus zweiter Hand	Karlheinz Bieber	Louise Martini, Horst Tappert, Erik Schumann	Comedy	
Mathias Kneissl	Reinhard Hauff	Hans Brenner, Eva Mattes, Ruth Drexel, Hanna Schygulla	Crime, Biography	
The Mayfly and the Frog	Wolf Dietrich	O. W. Fischer, Renate Roland	Comedy	a.k.a. Die Fliege und der Frosch
Die menschliche Pyramide	Hans Dieter Schwarze	Leonard Steckel, Ursula Herking, Günter Strack, Wolfgang Büttner, Iris Erdmann, Dagmar Biener	Drama	a.k.a. Die menschliche Pyramide oder Wohl dem, der eine Bleibe hat
The Merchant of Four Seasons	Rainer Werner Fassbinder	Hans Hirschmüller, Irm Hermann, Ingrid Caven, Klaus Löwitsch, Hanna Schygulla, Kurt Raab	Drama	
Die Messe der erfüllten Wünsche	Franz Peter Wirth	Reiner Schöne, Nicole Heesters, Anne-Marie Kuster	Drama	a.k.a. Fair of Fulfilled Wishes
Das Messer	Rolf von Sydow	Hardy Krüger, Eva Renzi, Charles Régnier, Klaus Löwitsch, Sonja Ziemann	Mystery thriller	
Middle of the Night	Werner Schlechte	Karin Anselm, Arno Assmann	Drama	a.k.a. Mitten in der Nacht
Miks Bumbullis	Günter Gräwert	Siegfried Wischnewski	Crime drama	
The Mirror of Fools	Hans Quest	Martin Hirthe, Ruth Maria Kubitschek, Hans Clarin, Martin Benrath, Anita Lochner, Sieghardt Rupp, Carl Lange	Adventure	a.k.a. Narrenspiegel
Mit Achtzehn	Rainer Wolffhardt	Hansi Jochmann	Drama	a.k.a. Mit 18
Ein Mordanschlag	Karl Peter Biltz	Kurt Ehrhardt	Thriller	
Morgen fällt die Schule aus	Werner Jacobs	Hansi Kraus, Theo Lingen, Rudolf Schündler, Heintje	Comedy	Die Lümmel von der ersten Bank film series
Die Münchner Räterepublik	Helmut Ashley	Charles Régnier, Peter Pasetti, Carl Lange, Christoph Bantzer, Herbert Fleischmann, Günther Ungeheuer, Werner Kreindl	Docudrama	a.k.a. The Munich Soviet Republic
Murders in the Rue Morgue	Gordon Hessler	Jason Robards, Christine Kaufmann, Lilli Palmer, Herbert Lom, Adolfo Celi, Maria Perschy	Horror, Mystery thriller	American-Spanish-West German co-production
Murmur of the Heart	Louis Malle	Lea Massari, Daniel Gélin, Benoît Ferreux, Michel Lonsdale, Gila von Weitershausen	Comedy	French-Italian-West German co-production
My Father, the Ape and I	Franz Antel	Mascha Gonska, Gunther Philipp, Heinz Reincke, Teri Tordai	Comedy	West German-Austrian co-production
Napoleon und Joghurt	Ceco Zamurovich	Günther Ungeheuer, Peter Pasetti, Agnes Fink, Christa Berndl	Crime	
Neutral Ground	Georg Wildhagen	Siegfried Lowitz, Uwe Friedrichsen, Walter Rilla	Spy drama	a.k.a. Auf neutralem Boden
The Night in Lisbon	Zbyněk Brynych	Martin Benrath, Erika Pluhar, Vadim Glowna, Horst Frank, Charles Régnier	Drama, War	
No, No, Nanette	Alfred Kirchner	Karin Anselm, Peter Kraus, Walter Giller, Dagmar Altrichter	Musical	
Office Girls	Ernst Hofbauer	Reinhard Glemnitz, Emily Reuer, Karin Field, Günther Ungeheuer	Sex report film	
Oliver	Ludwig Cremer	Andreas Seyferth, Klausjürgen Wussow, Werner Kreindl, Charles Régnier, Ingmar Zeisberg, Alexander May, Krista Keller, Gert Westphal	Crime	
One	Ulrich Schamoni	Andrea Rau, Ulrich Schamoni	Comedy	
Operation Walküre	Franz Peter Wirth	Joachim Hansen, Ernst Fritz Fürbringer, Karl-Heinz von Hassel	War, Docudrama	
Der Opernball	Eugen York	Harald Serafin, Mária Tiboldi, Heinz Erhardt, Christiane Schröder, Uwe Friedrichsen, Elfie Fiegert, Ernst Stankovski	Musical	
Our Willi Is the Best	Werner Jacobs	Heinz Erhardt	Comedy	
Paul Esbeck	Erich Neureuther	Henning Gissel, Gert Haucke, Heinz Meier, Arnold Marquis, Ernst Fritz Fürbringer, Margarethe von Trotta, Volkert Kraeft, Hans Peter Hallwachs	Drama	
Der Pedell	Eberhard Itzenplitz	Manfred Seipold, Heinz Schacht	Drama, War	a.k.a. The Janitor
Pioneers in Ingolstadt	Rainer Werner Fassbinder	Hanna Schygulla, Harry Baer, Klaus Löwitsch, Walter Sedlmayr, Irm Hermann	Drama	
Der Pott	Peter Zadek	Curt Bois, Wolfgang Schneider, Günter Lamprecht, Helga Anders, Hannelore Hoger, Rosel Zech, Heinz Bennent	Drama	a.k.a. The Silver Tassie
Eine Prämie für Irene	Helke Sander	Gundula Schroeder	Drama	a.k.a. A Bonus for Irene
Preußen über alles...	Rudolf Jugert	Heinz Klevenow, Dieter Borsche, Heinz Weiss, Heinz Engelmann, Paul Verhoeven, Wolfgang Büttner, Konrad Georg, Charles Régnier, Siegfried Wischnewski	Docudrama, History	a.k.a. Preußen über alles... – Bismarcks deutsche Einigung
Der Prokurator oder Die Liebe der schönen Bianca	Jörg A. Eggers	Johanna Matz, Matthias Fuchs, Sebastian Fischer	Comedy	Austrian-West German co-production
Das provisorische Leben	Rainer Wolffhardt	Donata Höffer, Michael Ande, Anaid Iplicjian	Crime drama	
Purgatory	Haro Senft	Jost Vobeck, Ingeborg Schöner, Paul Albert Krumm, Valeria Ciangottini	Crime	
Return of Sabata	Gianfranco Parolini	Lee Van Cleef, Reiner Schöne, Annabella Incontrera	Western	Italian-French-West German co-production
The Reverend Turns a Blind Eye	Harald Vock	Roy Black, Uschi Glas, Georg Thomalla	Comedy	
Rio das Mortes	Rainer Werner Fassbinder	Michael König, Günther Kaufmann, Hanna Schygulla	Comedy	
Rote Fahnen sieht man besser	Rolf Schübel, Theo Gallehr		Documentary	
Rudi, Behave!	Franz Josef Gottlieb	Rudi Carrell, Chris Roberts	Comedy	
The Sailing City	Werner Schlechte	Kaspar Brüninghaus, Barbara Nüsse, Heinz Moog	Drama	a.k.a. Die Stadt unter Segeln
Saint Joan	Franz Josef Wild	Maresa Hörbiger, Peter Vogel, Albert Lieven, Ernst Fritz Fürbringer, Gustav Knuth, Peter Fricke, Walther Reyer, Heinrich Schweiger, Helmut Qualtinger	Drama	
Salome	Werner Schroeter	Mascha Rabben, Magdalena Montezuma, Ellen Umlauf	Drama	
Sand	Peter Palitzsch	Valentin Jeker, Malte Jaeger	Drama	
Der scharfe Heinrich	Rolf Thiele	Horst Frank, Grit Boettcher	Sex comedy	
Der Schlafwagenkontrolleur	Heinz Schirk	Alfred Böhm, Christiane Hörbiger, Franziska Oehme, Klaus Havenstein	Drama	a.k.a. Le Contrôleur des wagons-lits
Die Schrott-Story	Paul May	Eric Pohlmann, Dagmar Koller, Hans von Borsody	Docudrama	a.k.a. The Scrap Story. West German-Austrian co-production
Sein Schutzengel	Thomas Fantl	Friedrich Schütter, Jürgen Flimm, Liane Hielscher	Drama	
Seine Majestät Gustav Krause	Günter Gräwert	Siegfried Wischnewski	Comedy	
Seltsamer Tod eines Filialleiters	Carlheinz Caspari	Heinz Opfinger	Drama	
Sharks on Board	Arthur Maria Rabenalt	Freddy Quinn, Karin Dor, Werner Pochath	Adventure	
She Killed in Ecstasy	Jesús Franco	Ewa Strömberg, Soledad Miranda, Fred Williams, Horst Tappert	Horror	West German-Spanish co-production
Slime	Heinz von Cramer	Eugène Ionesco	Drama	a.k.a. Schlamm a.k.a. La Vase. Swiss-West German co-production
Die Sonne angreifen	Peter Lilienthal	Simonetta Stefanelli, Jess Hahn, Willy Semmelrogge	Drama	
Sparks in Neu-Grönland	Joachim Hess	Robert Meyn, Heidi Stroh, Susanne Beck	Comedy	
The Story of a Humble Christian	Fritz Umgelter	Guido Wieland, Werner Kreindl	Biography	a.k.a. Das Abenteuer eines armen Christenmenschen
The Sudden Wealth of the Poor People of Kombach	Volker Schlöndorff	Reinhard Hauff, Georg Lehn, Karl-Josef Cramer, Margarethe von Trotta	Crime drama	
Supergirl	Rudolf Thome	Iris Berben, Marquard Bohm, Jess Hahn	Drama	
The Taming of the Shrew	Otto Schenk	Klaus Maria Brandauer, Christine Ostermayer	Comedy	
The Three Faces of Tamara Bunke	Helmut Ashley	Andrea Jonasson, Peter Ehrlich	History, Biography	a.k.a. The 3 Faces of Tamara Bunke
Tiger Gang	Harald Reinl	Tony Kendall, Brad Harris	Thriller	a.k.a. FBI Operation Pakistan. Kommissar X film. West German-Italian-Pakistani co-production
Ein toller Dreh	Kurt Wilhelm	Gerlinde Locker, Günther Ungeheuer, Friedrich Schoenfelder, Kathrin Ackermann, Klaus Havenstein	Comedy	a.k.a. Uproar in the House
To-morrow	Diethard Klante	Friedrich Maurer, Hilde Lermann, Rüdiger Bahr, Alfred Balthoff	Drama	a.k.a. Nachricht aus Colebrook
Der trojanische Sessel	Günter Gräwert	Helmut Käutner, Curt Bois, Käthe Haack, Erika von Thellmann	Black comedy	
Trotta	Johannes Schaaf	András Bálint, Doris Kunstmann, Rosemarie Fendel	Drama	
Twenty Girls and the Teachers	Werner Jacobs	Mascha Gonska, Heidi Kabel, Rudolf Schündler, Ralf Wolter	Comedy	a.k.a. 20 Girls and the Teachers
Und Jimmy ging zum Regenbogen	Alfred Vohrer	Ruth Leuwerik, Horst Frank, Horst Tappert, Judy Winter, Alain Noury, Doris Kunstmann	Thriller	a.k.a. The Caesar Code. Based on the book by Johannes Mario Simmel
Die Untaten des Fräulein Miková	Thomas Fantl	Karin Anselm, Peter Schiff, Günter Pfitzmann	Comedy	
Vampira	George Moorse	Grischa Huber, Louis Waldon, Del Negro	Fantasy	
The Vampire Happening	Freddie Francis	Pia Degermark, Thomas Hunter, Ferdy Mayne, Ingrid van Bergen	Comedy, Horror	
Vampyros Lesbos	Jesús Franco	Ewa Strömberg, Soledad Miranda, Dennis Price, Paul Muller	Horror	Spanish-West German co-production
Verschwörung in Ulm	Frank Guthke	Jochen Busse, Willi Kowalj, Ulli Kinalzik, Alexander May, Peter Pasetti, Bruno Dallansky	Docudrama	a.k.a. Verschwörung in Ulm – Der Reichswehrprozeß 1930
Die Versöhnung	Horst Flick	Tilli Breidenbach, Wolfgang Büttner	Drama	
Vier Tage unentschuldigt	Rolf Busch	Rolf Becker	Drama	a.k.a. 4 Tage unentschuldigt
Viola and Sebastian	Ottokar Runze	Karin Hübner, Frank Glaubrecht, Inken Sommer, Uwe Dallmeier	Comedy	a.k.a. Twelfth Night
Violence	Helma Sanders-Brahms	Angelika Bender, Werner Umberg	Crime drama	
Visit to a Small Planet	Wolfgang Liebeneiner	Peter Fricke, Klaus Schwarzkopf, Hildegard Krekel, Peter Pasetti, Michael Hinz, Dieter Borsche	Science fiction, Comedy	
Ein Vogel bin ich nicht	Tom Toelle	Jörg Pleva, Karl-Heinz von Hassel, Heinz Meier, Claus Eberth, Tommi Piper	Drama	
Wanted: One Body	Ottokar Runze	Gisela Uhlen, Henning Schlüter, Wolf Roth, Inken Sommer, Renate Roland, Franz Muxeneder	Crime	a.k.a. Leiche gesucht
The Weavers	Günter Gräwert	Siegfried Lowitz, Uwe Friedrichsen, Heinz Meier, Fritz Rasp	Drama	
Web of the Spider	Antonio Margheriti	Anthony Franciosa, Michèle Mercier, Klaus Kinski, Peter Carsten	Horror, Mystery	Italian-French-West German co-production
Wenn mein Schätzchen auf die Pauke haut	Peter Weck	Uschi Glas, Roy Black, Theo Lingen, Peter Weck, Ilja Richter, Gunther Philipp	Comedy	
Wer kennt diesen Mann?	Diethard Klante	Günter Pfitzmann, Doris Schade, Paul Albert Krumm	Thriller	
What the Peeper Saw	James Kelley, Andrea Bianchi	Mark Lester, Britt Ekland, Hardy Krüger, Lilli Palmer, Harry Andrews	Thriller	a.k.a. Night Hair Child. British-Spanish-Italian-West German co-production
Whity	Rainer Werner Fassbinder	Günther Kaufmann, Hanna Schygulla, Ron Randell, Ulli Lommel, Katrin Schaake, Harry Baer	Drama	
Who Laughs Last, Laughs Best	Harald Reinl	Roy Black, Uschi Glas, Theo Lingen	Comedy	
Willy und Lilly	Franz Peter Wirth	Maria Schell, Heinz Baumann	Drama	a.k.a. Willy & Lilly
Wolves and Sheep	Wilm ten Haaf	Hilde Hildebrand, Martin Lüttge, Alexander Hegarth, Walter Jokisch, Rudolf Schündler, Manfred Inger, Hannelore Elsner	Comedy	
Das Wunder	Rolf Busch	Lutz Mackensy, Henning Gissel, Lilith Ungerer, Gustl Bayrhammer, Günter Lamprecht	Crime	
X312 - Flight to Hell	Jesús Franco	Thomas Hunter, Gila von Weitershausen, Fernando Sancho, Siegfried Schürenberg, Hans Hass Jr.	Disaster	Spanish-West German co-production
Yester – Der Name stimmt doch?	Karlheinz Bieber	Horst Tappert, Doris Kunstmann	Thriller	
Die Zeit schreit nach Satire	Dietrich Haugk	Klaus Schwarzkopf, Günter Pfitzmann, Herbert Bötticher, Hanne Wieder	Comedy	
Der Zeuge	Reinhard Mieke	Rolf Boysen, Charles Régnier, Pinkas Braun, Ferdy Mayne	Crime	
Zum kleinen Glück	Werner Schlechte	Karin Anselm, Günther Ungeheuer, Joachim Ansorge, Ulli Philipp	Comedy	a.k.a. Au petit bonheur a.k.a. Happy Go Lucky
Zwei Briefe an Pospischiel	Roland Gall	Eberhard Fechner	Drama	a.k.a. Two Letters to Pospischiel

== 1972 ==
Title	Director	Cast	Genre	Notes
Der 21. Juli	Peter Schulze-Rohr	Hannes Messemer, Bruno Dallansky, Wolfgang Wahl	War, Alternate history	
8051 Grinning	Peter Beauvais	Maria Singer, Veronika Fitz	Drama	
Adele Spitzeder	Peer Raben	Ruth Drexel, Peter Kern, Monica Bleibtreu	Biography, Crime	
Agent aus der Retorte	Wolfgang Glück	Rüdiger Vogler, Udo Vioff, Knut Hinz, Lutz Mackensy, Christiane Schröder	Docudrama, Spy, War	
Aguirre, the Wrath of God	Werner Herzog	Klaus Kinski, Helena Rojo, Ruy Guerra, Del Negro, Peter Berling	Adventure, Historical film	West German-Peruvian-Mexican co-production
Alleluja & Sartana are Sons... Sons of God	Mario Siciliano	Ron Ely, Uschi Glas, Alberto Dell'Acqua	Western, Comedy	a.k.a. Halleluja and Sartana Strike Again a.k.a. 100 Fäuste und ein Vaterunser. Italian-West German co-production
Altersheim	Claus Peter Witt	Johanna Hofer, Käthe Haack, Rudolf Fernau	Drama	
Always Trouble with the Reverend	Harald Vock	Georg Thomalla, Peter Weck, Theo Lingen	Comedy	
Der Amateur	Rainer Erler	Klaus Herm, Evelyn Opela, Will Danin	Thriller	a.k.a. Think of a Number
The Andersonville Trial	Michael Kehlmann	Günter Mack, Hans Korte, Walter Kohut	Drama	a.k.a. Der Andersonville-Prozess
Der Angestellte	Helma Sanders-Brahms	Ernst Jacobi, Wolfgang Kieling	Drama	
Anna und Totò	Wolfgang Petersen	Franco Lantieri, Renate Heilmeyer	Drama	
Arbeitskampf	Rolf Schübel, Theo Gallehr		Documentary	
Assignment: Munich	David Lowell Rich	Richard Basehart, Roy Scheider, Lesley Ann Warren, Werner Klemperer, Karl-Otto Alberty	Thriller	American-West German co-production
Auf den Spuren der Anarchisten	Oswald Döpke	Herbert Fleischmann, Gertrud Kückelmann, Hans Korte, Bernhard Minetti, Hannelore Elsner	Crime	a.k.a. Auf den Spuren der Anarchisten – Der Fall Ravachol
Baron Blood	Mario Bava	Joseph Cotten, Elke Sommer	Horror	Italian-West German co-production
The Baroness	Oswald Döpke	Hannelore Elsner, Wolfgang Reichmann	Drama	a.k.a. Deutsche Novelle
Benjamin	Willy Bogner Jr.	Philipp Sonntag	Comedy, Sport	a.k.a. Benjamin − Ein Meister fällt vom Himmel
Betreten verboten	Hans Dieter Schwarze	Martin Lüttge, Hans Caninenberg	Comedy	
The Big Bust Out	Ernst R. von Theumer	Vonetta McGee, Monica Teuber, Tony Kendall, William Berger, Gordon Mitchell	Exploitation	Italian-West German co-production
The Bitter Tears of Petra von Kant	Rainer Werner Fassbinder	Margit Carstensen, Irm Hermann, Hanna Schygulla	Drama	
Bluebeard	Edward Dmytryk	Richard Burton, Raquel Welch, Virna Lisi, Nathalie Delon, Marilù Tolo, Agostina Belli, Karin Schubert	Thriller	French-Italian-West German co-production
Bloody Friday	Rolf Olsen	Raimund Harmstorf, Gila von Weitershausen, Amadeus August	Crime thriller	West German-Italian co-production
Blüten der Gesellschaft	Werner Schlechte	Margot Trooger, Horst Tappert	Crime comedy	
Boccaccio	Georg Marischka	Erland Hagegård, Dorothea Chryst, Patricia McCrew, Ernst Schütz	Musical	
Bremen Freedom	Rainer Werner Fassbinder	Margit Carstensen, Wolfgang Kieling, Wolfgang Schenck, Ulli Lommel, Hanna Schygulla, Kurt Raab	Crime drama	
Cabaret	Bob Fosse	Liza Minnelli, Michael York, Helmut Griem, Joel Grey, Fritz Wepper, Marisa Berenson, Ralf Wolter, Helen Vita, Elisabeth Neumann-Viertel	Musical, Drama	American-West German co-production
The Call of the Wild	Ken Annakin	Charlton Heston, Michèle Mercier, Raimund Harmstorf	Adventure	British-French-Italian-Spanish-West German co-production
Cause of Divorce	Marcello Fondato	Senta Berger, Catherine Spaak	Comedy	Italian-West German co-production
César and Rosalie	Claude Sautet	Romy Schneider, Yves Montand, Sami Frey	Comedy-drama	French-Italian-West German co-production
The Count of Luxemburg	Wolfgang Glück	Eberhard Wächter, Lilian Sukis	Musical	
Cry of the Black Wolves	Harald Reinl	Ron Ely, Raimund Harmstorf, Gila von Weitershausen, Arthur Brauss	Adventure	
Das bin ich	Rudolf Nussgruber	Attila Hörbiger, Werner Pochath, Fritz Muliar, Alma Seidler, Marianne Schönauer, Lotte Ledl, Leopold Rudolf, Peter Matic, Guido Wieland, Erich Auer	Drama	a.k.a. Das bin ich – Wiener Schicksale aus den 30er Jahren: Österreich zwischen Demokratie und Diktatur. Austrian-West German co-production
The Dead Are Alive	Armando Crispino	Alex Cord, Samantha Eggar, John Marley, Horst Frank, Nadja Tiller	Thriller	Italian-West German-Yugoslav co-production
The Deadly Avenger of Soho	Jesús Franco	Horst Tappert, Fred Williams, Barbara Rütting, Wolfgang Kieling, Siegfried Schürenberg	Thriller	West German-Spanish co-production
Dear Mother, I'm All Right	Christian Ziewer	Claus Eberth	Drama	
Dear Murderer	Heinz Schirk	Werner Bruhns, Nicole Heesters, Udo Vioff, Herbert Fleischmann	Thriller	a.k.a. Geliebter Mörder
The Death of Maria Malibran	Werner Schroeter	Magdalena Montezuma, Christine Kaufmann, Candy Darling, Ingrid Caven	Drama, Music	
Defraudanten	Helmut Pfandler	Karl Paryla, Rainer von Artenfels	Comedy	a.k.a. The Embezzlers. Austrian-West German co-production
The Disciplined Woman	Ernst Hofbauer	Astrid Frank, Margot Mahler	Exploitation	
Don't Get Angry	Peter Weck	Georg Thomalla, Uschi Glas, Christiane Hörbiger	Comedy	
Doppelspiel in Paris	Wolfgang Glück	Luitgard Im, Harald Leipnitz, Barbara Lass, Hartmut Reck, Udo Vioff, Ferdy Mayne	War, Docudrama	
Einfach davonsegeln!	Korbinian Köberle	Siegfried Lowitz, Wolfgang Büttner, Margot Trooger, Karin Anselm	Comedy	a.k.a. The Escape Club
Einmal im Leben	Dieter Wedel	Antje Hagen, Fritz Lichtenhahn, Günter Strack, Hans Korte, Uwe Dallmeier	Comedy	a.k.a. Einmal im Leben – Geschichte eines Eigenheims
Der Eisberg der Vorsehung	Thomas Schamoni	Wolfgang Kieling, Friedrich G. Beckhaus	Docudrama	
Elisabeth, Kaiserin von Österreich	Theodor Grädler, Jörg A. Eggers	Marisa Mell	Biography	Austrian-West German co-production
Die Erbschaft	Stanislav Barabáš	Anne-Marie Kuster, Peter Striebeck, Siegfried Rauch	Comedy	a.k.a. L'Héritage
Eye in the Labyrinth	Mario Caiano	Rosemary Dexter, Adolfo Celi, Horst Frank, Alida Valli, Sybil Danning	Thriller	Italian-West German co-production
Der Fall Opa	Harald Philipp	Rudolf Platte, Siegfried Lowitz, Herbert Fleischmann	Crime comedy	
Federlesen	Eberhard Itzenplitz	Wolfgang Wahl, Ilse Pagé, Hans Schweikart	Drama	
Ferdinand Lassalle	Helmut Ashley	Hans Peter Hallwachs, Andrea Jonasson, Gisela Uhlen, Werner Kreindl	Biography, History	
Fettaugen	Werner Schlechte	Gustl Bayrhammer, Franz Muxeneder	Comedy	a.k.a. Fettaugen – Eine Idylle aus der deutschen Provinz
Finito l'amor	Peter Beauvais	Camilla Spira, Wolfgang Büttner, Paul Verhoeven, Wolfgang Lukschy, Ruth Hellberg	Drama	
Fish for Four	Ulrich Lauterbach	Horst Bollmann, Bruni Löbel, Dagmar Altrichter, Käthe Lindenberg	Black comedy	a.k.a. Fisch zu viert. Remake of Fish for Four (1970)
Die Fledermaus	Otto Schenk	Gundula Janowitz, Eberhard Waechter, Renate Holm, Erich Kunz, Wolfgang Windgassen, Heinz Holecek, Waldemar Kmentt, Otto Schenk	Musical	
Flint	Hans Lietzau	Martin Held, Bernhard Minetti, Rolf Henniger	Comedy	
Eine Frau bleibt eine Frau	Alfred Weidenmann	Lilli Palmer, Paul Hubschmid, Karl Michael Vogler, Horst Tappert, Alexander Kerst, Horst Janson, Sabine Sinjen, Vera Tschechowa	Anthology, Comedy	a.k.a. Eine Frau bleibt eine Frau – Zehn Geschichten mit Lilli Palmer
A Free Woman	Volker Schlöndorff	Margarethe von Trotta, Martin Lüttge, Ruth Hellberg, Georg Marischka, Walter Sedlmayr	Drama	a.k.a. Strohfeuer
Freizeitraum, Bau 2	Diethard Klante	Friedhelm Ptok	Drama	
Die Fremde	Carlheinz Caspari	Elisabeth Ackermann, István Bury, Enrico Ostermann, Jan Groth	War	a.k.a. The Foreigner
Frohe Ostern	Oswald Döpke	Martin Held, Inge Langen, Gertrud Kückelmann, Ernst Fritz Fürbringer	Crime	a.k.a. Die Erlebnisse des Amateur-Kriminalisten Beno von Stürler
Galgentoni	Michael Kehlmann	Jitka Frantová Pelikánová	Drama	
Gasparone	Wolfgang Liebeneiner	Arlene Saunders, Barry McDaniel, Benno Kusche, Joachim Hansen	Musical	
Geheimagenten	Eberhard Fechner	Klaus Herm, Hans Christian Blech, Cordula Trantow, Helga Feddersen, Uwe Dallmeier	Comedy	
Das Geheimnis der Mary Celeste	Hans Stumpf	Hans-Joachim Kulenkampff, Wera Frydtberg, Herbert Fleischmann	Mystery, Adventure	
Geliebtes Scheusal	Jürgen Goslar	Peter Pasetti, Ernst Stankovski, Gundy Grand, Detlev Eckstein, Eva Ingeborg Scholz	Comedy	a.k.a. The Man Most Likely to ...
Geradeaus bis zum Morgen	Peter Adam	Arthur Brauss, Klaus Grünberg	Crime	
Gewissensentscheidung	Nathan Jariv	Tebbe Harms Kleen, Ulrich Matschoss, Ulli Kinalzik, Andrea Jonasson	Docudrama	
Gladiatoren	Herbert Ballmann	Jo Bolling, Jörg Cossardt, Donata Höffer, Hildegard Krekel, Günter Lamprecht, Jürgen Schmidt, Matthias Ponnier	Drama	
The Goalkeeper's Fear of the Penalty	Wim Wenders	Arthur Brauss, Erika Pluhar, Kai Fischer	Crime drama	a.k.a. The Goalie's Anxiety at the Penalty Kick. West German-Austrian co-production
The Golden Thing	Edgar Reitz, Ula Stöckl, Alf Brustellin, Nicos Perakis	Christian Reitz, Oliver Jovine	Fantasy	
The Good God of Manhattan	Klaus Kirschner	Mathieu Carrière, Verena Buss	Drama	
Gran Canaria	Jörg-Michael Baldenius	Klaus Schwarzkopf, Herbert Mensching, Anita Lochner	Crime comedy	
The Grand Duel	Giancarlo Santi	Lee Van Cleef, Horst Frank, Jess Hahn, Klaus Grünberg	Western	a.k.a. The Big Showdown. Italian-French-West German co-production
Gun Before Butter	Peter Zadek	Frank Finlay, Françoise Prévost, Cyd Hayman, Oscar Homolka, Françoise Arnoul, Pierre Vaneck, Werner Finck, Hans Jaray	Crime	a.k.a. Van der Valk und das Mädchen. West German-French co-production
Happy End	Heinz Schirk	Margot Rothweiler, Siegfried Rauch, Barbara Valentin	Musical	
Havoc	Peter Fleischmann	Reinhard Kolldehoff, Vitus Zeplichal, Ingmar Zeisberg	Drama	West German-French co-production
The Heath Is Green	Harald Reinl	Roy Black, Monika Lundi, Heidi Kabel, Henry Vahl, Jutta Speidel	Musical	
Heiß und kalt	Gustav Ehmck	Gerhild Berktold, Christian Marquard	Drama	a.k.a. Heiss und kalt a.k.a. Kalt und heiß a.k.a. Kalt und heiss
Der Held	Hagen Mueller-Stahl	Rolf Becker, Gerd Baltus, Elisabeth Schwarz, Heinz Schubert	Crime	a.k.a. Der Held – Roman eines politischen Mordes
Herlemanns Traum	Tom Toelle	Vadim Glowna	Drama	a.k.a. Herlemanns Traum oder Das andere Leben
Herr Soldan hat keine Vergangenheit	Joachim Hess	Dieter Weiler, Siegfried Lowitz, Ruth Maria Kubitschek	Thriller	
History Lessons	Straub–Huillet	Gottfried Bold	Drama	Italian-West German co-production
Hundertwasser's Rainy Day	Peter Schamoni	Friedensreich Hundertwasser	Documentary	
The Hunted	Karl Heinz Zeitler	Lee Remick, Michael Hinz, Ivan Desny	Thriller	a.k.a. Touch Me Not a.k.a. Trauma. West German-Spanish-French co-production
Der Hutmacher	Wolfgang Liebeneiner	Leopold Rudolf	Drama	Austrian-West German co-production
The Italian	Ferry Radax	Fabrizio Jovine, Rosemarie Fendel	Drama	a.k.a. Der Italiener. Austrian-West German co-production
Jail Bait	Rainer Werner Fassbinder	Eva Mattes, Harry Baer, Jörg von Liebenfelß, Ruth Drexel	Drama	a.k.a. Wild Game
La Jalousie	Klaus Kirschner	Michael Degen, Ingrid Resch	Drama	
Jörn Drescher, 19 Jahre	Udo Langhoff	Volker Eckstein, Konrad Georg, Christine Golling, Giulia Follina, Susanne Beck	Drama	
Jugend einer Studienrätin	Rainer Wolffhardt	Regine Lamster, Heinz Weiss, Eva Kotthaus	Drama, War	
Die keusche Susanne	Thomas Engel	Maria Schell, Harald Juhnke, Barbara Schöne, Peer Schmidt, Amadeus August, Fritz Tillmann	Musical comedy	a.k.a. Chaste Susanne
King, Queen, Knave	Jerzy Skolimowski	David Niven, Gina Lollobrigida, John Moulder-Brown, Mario Adorf	Comedy	American-West German co-production
Das Klavier	Fritz Umgelter	Anneliese Uhlig, Günter Strack, Maria Körber, Andrea Dahmen, Helmut Wildt, Günter Mack, Guido Wieland, Willi Rose, Karl John, Matthias Habich	Drama, War	
Knast	Theo Mezger	Helmut Brasch, Jürgen Prochnow, Wolf Richards, Almut Eggert, Irmgard Riessen	Anthology, Crime drama	
Land	Roland Gall	Karl John	Drama	
Laß jucken, Kumpel	Franz Marischka	Anne Graf, Michel Jacot, Rinaldo Talamonti	Softcore	a.k.a. Lass jucken, Kumpel a.k.a. The Miner's Wife ... Takes Her Pick
Der letzte Werkelmann	Jörg A. Eggers	Hans Putz, Kurt Sowinetz, Hugo Gottschlich, Bruno Hübner, Erni Mangold, Heinz Marecek, Michael Janisch, Grete Zimmer, Kurt Jaggberg, Peter Fricke	Drama	Austrian-West German co-production
Der Leuchtturm	Vojtěch Jasný	Hans Christian Blech	Drama	West German-Austrian co-production
Der Lift	Georg Tressler	Eduard Wegrostek, Marie Versini, Walter Buschhoff	Drama	
Ludwig	Luchino Visconti	Helmut Berger, Trevor Howard, Silvana Mangano, Gert Fröbe, Romy Schneider, Helmut Griem	Biography	Italian-French-West German co-production
Ludwig: Requiem for a Virgin King	Hans-Jürgen Syberberg	Harry Baer, Peter Kern, Günther Kaufmann, Ingrid Caven, Gert Haucke	Drama	
A Man to Respect	Michele Lupo	Kirk Douglas, Giuliano Gemma, Florinda Bolkan, Wolfgang Preiss, Reinhard Kolldehoff	Crime thriller	a.k.a. The Master Touch. Italian-West German co-production
Mandala	Rainer Wolffhardt	Heinz Bennent	Thriller	
Manolescu	Hans Quest	Michael Heltau, Diana Körner, Anaid Iplicjian, Maria Sebaldt, Anita Lochner, Hans Söhnker, Rudolf Schündler, Dieter Borsche, Günter Strack	Crime comedy	a.k.a. Manolescu – Die fast wahre Biographie eines Gauners
Marie	Hans W. Geißendörfer	Anna Martins, Maria Schell, Heinz Bennent	Drama	
The Marquis of Keith	Hans Lietzau	Martin Benrath, Hannelore Hoger	Drama	
Marya Sklodowska-Curie – Ein Mädchen, das die Welt veränderte	Wolfgang Staudte	Christine Wodetzky	Biography	a.k.a. Maria Skłodowska-Curie
Maske in Blau	Hermann Kugelstadt	Rudolf Schock, Mária Tiboldi, Lukas Ammann	Musical	
Max Hoelz	Rudolf Nussgruber	Günter Mack, Udo Vioff, Heinz Weiss, Dieter Borsche, Ferdy Mayne	Docudrama	
Memories of a Summer in Berlin	Rolf Hädrich	Burt Nelson, Franziska Bronnen	Drama	a.k.a. You Can't Go Home Again
The Merry Quartet from the Filling Station	Franz Antel	Uschi Glas, Hans-Jürgen Bäumler, Willy Millowitsch	Musical comedy	West German-Austrian co-production
Mit dem Strom	Wolfgang Schleif	Dieter Borsche, Wolfgang Büttner, Carl Lange, Claus Wilcke, Günter Strack, Uwe Friedrichsen, Claus Holm, Michael Hinz	Drama	
Mitteilungen über eine Schuld	Frank Guthke	Doris Kunstmann, Ida Ehre	Drama	
Monsieur Chasse	Rolf von Sydow	Karl Michael Vogler, Erika Pluhar	Comedy	
The Morals of Ruth Halbfass	Volker Schlöndorff	Senta Berger, Helmut Griem, Margarethe von Trotta, Peter Ehrlich	Crime drama	
My Daughter, Your Daughter	Werner Jacobs	Georg Thomalla, Peter Weck, Heinz Reincke, Silvia Reize	Comedy	
Die Nacht ist nicht allein zum Schlafen da	Gerhard Schmidt	Karl Michael Vogler, Dunja Rajter, Herbert Fux, Marius Müller-Westernhagen	Musical comedy	
Nasrin, or The Art of Dreaming	Vojtěch Jasný	Erika Pluhar, Evelyn Opela, Heinz Bennent	Fantasy	
Nicht Lob, noch Furcht: Graf Galen, Bischof von Münster	Paul May	Wolfgang Büttner	War, Biography	a.k.a. Nec Laudibus, Nec Timore: Clemens August Graf von Galen, Bishop of Münster
Nightshade	Niklaus Schilling	Elke Haltaufderheide, John van Dreelen	Drama	
Nocturno	Hajo Gies	Rakhchandeh Ettehad	Drama	
Not Dumb, The Bird	Jean Delannoy	Françoise Rosay, Anny Duperey, Bruno Pradal, Harald Leipnitz, Siegfried Rauch	Comedy crime	French-West German-Italian co-production
Nurse Report	Walter Boos	Elisabeth Volkmann, Ingrid Steeger	Sex report film	a.k.a. Nurses Report
Ohne Nachsicht	Theodor Kotulla	Henry van Lyck, Joachim Regelien, Heidi Stroh, Eva Christian	Drama	
Old Mamsell's Secret	Herbert Ballmann	Brigitte Horney, Giulia Follina, Volkert Kraeft, Dieter Borsche	Drama	
One for the Pot	Stefan Wigger	Herbert Mensching, Horst Bollmann, Robert Meyn, Gisela Mattishent, Rakhchandeh Ettehad, Dagmar Biener, Klaus Herm	Comedy	a.k.a. Viel, viel Geld
Ornifle oder Der erzürnte Himmel	Helmut Käutner	Peter Pasetti, Sky du Mont, Gerlinde Döberl	Comedy	a.k.a. Ornifle ou le Courant d'air a.k.a. It's Later Than You Think
Oscar Wilde	Hansgünther Heyme	Klaus Maria Brandauer, Edwin Noël, Doris Kunstmann, Hans Quest, Rudolf Schündler	Drama, Biography	
Das Paradies auf der anderen Seite	Karl Fruchtmann	Peter Striebeck, Alexander May, Günter Mack, Walter Kohut	Crime	
Present Laughter	Korbinian Köberle	O. W. Fischer, Johanna Matz	Comedy	a.k.a. Amouren
Die Promotionsfeier	Ilo von Jankó	Peter Striebeck, Heinz Schimmelpfennig, Eva Brumby	Drama	
Die Pueblo-Affäre	Rudolf Nussgruber	Hellmut Lange	Docudrama	a.k.a. The Pueblo Affair a.k.a. The Pueblo Incident
Der Radweltmeister	Hans Dieter Schwarze	Roland Astor, Hans Karl Friedrich, Carl Lange	Musical	
Rechtsprechung	Karlheinz Bieber	Wolfgang Kieling, Rudolf Schündler, Jürgen Goslar, Hans Paetsch	Docudrama	a.k.a. Rechtsprechung – Szenische Rekonstruktion des Prozesses gegen Dr. John Bodkin Adams
The Red Queen Kills Seven Times	Emilio Miraglia	Barbara Bouchet, Rudolf Schündler, Sybil Danning	Thriller	Italian-West German co-production
Rocker	Klaus Lemke	Gerd Kruskopf, Hans-Jürgen Modschiedler	Drama	
Seek Her Out	Oswald Döpke	Margot Leonard, Horst Frank, Günther Neutze, Günter Strack	Thriller	a.k.a. Im Namen der Freiheit
Der Seitensprung des Genossen Barkassow	Hans-Peter Kaufmann	Hans Korte, Günter Strack, Dagmar Mettler, Ralf Wolter	Comedy	
Die seltsamen Abenteuer des geheimen Kanzleisekretärs Tusmann	Helmut Käutner	Klaus Schwarzkopf, Carl-Heinz Schroth, Peter Vogel, Ilse Pagé	Comedy, Fantasy	a.k.a. The Choosing of the Bride a.k.a. Albertine's Wooers
The Sensuous Three	Robert van Ackeren	Mascha Rabben, Gabriele Lafari, Ulli Lommel, Rolf Zacher, Heidy Bohlen	Drama	a.k.a. Harlis
Seven Blood-Stained Orchids	Umberto Lenzi	Uschi Glas, Antonio Sabàto, Marisa Mell, Petra Schürmann	Thriller	Italian-West German co-production
Shot on Command	Rainer Wolffhardt	Jürgen Prochnow, Christoph Felsenstein	Crime	a.k.a. Shot on Command – The Sass Brothers, Once Berlin's Big Crooks
Sie hätten im Sommer kommen sollen	Hans Bachmüller	Ruth Maria Kubitschek, Christian Quadflieg, Walter Taub	Drama	
Sie liebten sich einen Sommer	Harald Reinl	Amadeus August, Gundy Grand	Drama	
The Silent Revolution	Eckehard Munck		Documentary	
Soft Shoulders, Sharp Curves	Gabriel Axel	Doris Arden, Franz Schafheitlin	Sex comedy	
State of Siege	Costa-Gavras	Yves Montand, O. E. Hasse, Renato Salvatori, Jacques Weber, Jean-Luc Bideau	Drama	French-Italian-West German co-production
Sternschnuppe	Herbert Vesely	Monika Lundi	Drama, Music	
Strange City	Rudolf Thome	Roger Fritz, Karin Thome, Georg Marischka	Crime	
The Stuff That Dreams Are Made Of	Alfred Vohrer	Paul Neuhaus, Hannelore Elsner, Herbert Fleischmann, Edith Heerdegen, Anton Diffring	Thriller	
Das System Fabrizzi	Imo Moszkowicz	Harald Leipnitz, Karin Baal, Friedrich Schoenfelder	Comedy	
Szenen aus dem Eheleben	Karl Peter Biltz	Heinz Bennent, Karin Eickelbaum	Drama	a.k.a. Scenes from Family Life
Tears of Blood	Alfred Vohrer	Alain Noury, Anita Lochner, Malte Thorsten, Wolfgang Reichmann	Drama	a.k.a. The Rain Erases Everything. West German-French co-production
Temptation in the Summer Wind	Rolf Thiele	Yvonne Furneaux, Paul Hubschmid, Peter Vogel, Helmut Käutner, Christiane Hörbiger	Comedy	
Theodor Hierneis oder Wie man ehem. Hofkoch wird	Hans-Jürgen Syberberg	Walter Sedlmayr	Docudrama	
Der Tod des Ministers	Walter Davy	Erika Pluhar, Sieghardt Rupp, Ernst Meister, Rudolf Wessely, Alfred Balthoff, Fritz Muliar, Kurt Sowinetz, Kurt Jaggberg	Drama	Austrian-West German co-production
Tod im Studio	Eberhard Itzenplitz	Gert Günther Hoffmann, Günter Gräwert, Manfred Sexauer, Karl Walter Diess, Kurd Pieritz	Thriller	
Eine Tote soll ermordet werden	Wilhelm Semmelroth	Siegfried Lowitz, Günter Mack, Ruth Maria Kubitschek, Anaid Iplicjian	Crime	
Ein Toter stoppt den 8 Uhr 10	Michael Braun	Franz Rudnick, Inge Solbrig, Claudia Wedekind, Wolf Richards, Werner Bruhns, Irene Marhold, Joachim Wichmann, Friedrich G. Beckhaus	Crime	
Trouble with Trixie	Franz Josef Gottlieb	Uschi Glas, Peter Weck	Comedy	
Verdacht gegen Barry Croft	Paul Verhoeven	Karlheinz Böhm, Karin Hübner, Herbert Fleischmann	Thriller	a.k.a. Suspicion Against Barry Croft
Verrat ist kein Gesellschaftsspiel	Wolfgang Staudte	Herbert Fleischmann, Arthur Brauss, Franz Rudnick, Willi Kowalj, Susanne Schaefer	Thriller	
Vier gegen das britische Pfund	Hans Stumpf	Gerd Baltus, Helmut Förnbacher, Rainer Basedow, Fred Haltiner, Renate Roland	Crime	a.k.a. 4 gegen das britische Pfund
Die Vitrine	Karlheinz Bieber	Ernst Stankovski, Brigitte Horney, Claudia Wedekind, Eva Maria Meineke, Ursula Herking	Comedy	
The Wedding	Horst Flick	Susi Nicoletti, Heinz Moog, Louise Martini, Karl Walter Diess, Eva Mattes, Adrienne Gessner, Hans Brenner	Drama	
What?	Roman Polanski	Sydne Rome, Marcello Mastroianni, Hugh Griffith	Comedy	French-Italian-West German co-production
What Have You Done to Solange?	Massimo Dallamano	Fabio Testi, Karin Baal, Joachim Fuchsberger	Mystery thriller	Italian-West German co-production
Where the Bullets Fly	Sergio Grieco	Antonio Sabàto, Marisa Mell, Lionel Stander, Fernando Sancho, Peter Carsten, Brigitte Skay	Western	Italian-Spanish-West German co-production
Wiener Blut	Hermann Lanske	Ingeborg Hallstein, René Kollo, Dagmar Koller, Benno Kusche, Ferry Gruber	Musical	
Willi Manages The Whole Thing	Werner Jacobs	Heinz Erhardt	Comedy	
Willi Tobler und der Untergang der 6. Flotte	Alexander Kluge	Alfred Edel, Hark Bohm, Hannelore Hoger	Science fiction	
Die Witwen	Tom Toelle	Heinz Bennent, Miriam Spoerri, Ulli Philipp, Luminița Iacobescu	Black comedy	a.k.a. Die Witwen oder Eine vollkommene Lösung
Ein Wochenende des Alfred Berger	Rainer Wolffhardt	Gunnar Möller, Dinah Hinz, Werner Kreindl	Drama	
Die Wollands	Marianne Lüdcke, Ingo Kratisch	Nicolas Brieger, Elfriede Irrall	Drama	
Zeitaufnahme	Rolf Busch	Franz Rudnick, Alexander May	Drama	
Zoff	Eberhard Pieper	Giulia Follina, Jürgen Prochnow, Hildegard Krekel, Claus Theo Gärtner	Drama	
Zur schönen Aussicht	Hans Hollmann	Reinhild Solf, Hans Peter Hallwachs, Roma Bahn, Traugott Buhre	Drama	

== 1973 ==
Title	Director	Cast	Genre	Notes
...aber Jonny!	Alfred Weidenmann	Horst Buchholz, Hannelore Elsner, Judy Winter, Herbert Fleischmann, Monika Lundi	Comedy	
Alfie	Karl Fruchtmann	Peter Striebeck, Anita Kupsch, Rosemarie Fendel, Brigitte Swoboda, Elisabeth Wiedemann	Comedy	
All People Will Be Brothers	Alfred Vohrer	Harald Leipnitz, Doris Kunstmann, Rainer von Artenfels	Drama	a.k.a. The Cain Conspiracy
Alle lieben Célimare	Thomas Engel	Heinz Bennent, Simone Rethel, Hannes Messemer, Gustl Bayrhammer	Comedy	a.k.a. Célimare le bien-aimé
Ausbruch	Harald Philipp	Pablo Kamolz, Hugo Panczak, Thomas Rau, Frank Rheinboldt, Lutz Riedel, Wolfgang Wiehe	Crime drama	
Battle of Berlin	Franz Baake, Jost von Morr		Documentary, War	
Bed Hostesses	Erwin C. Dietrich	Ingrid Steeger	Sex comedy	Swiss-West German co-production
Die Biedermänner	Wolf Dietrich	Josef Meinrad, Peter Vogel, Otto Tausig	Comedy	
Black Coffee	Claus Peter Witt	Horst Bollmann, Ulli Philipp, Ernst Fritz Fürbringer, Friedrich von Thun, Anita Lochner, Gert Haucke	Mystery	
The Black Forest Girl	Wolfgang Liebeneiner	Janet Perry, Willi Brokmeier, Rut Rex, Wolfgang Windgassen, Ralf Wolter	Musical	a.k.a. Schwarzwaldmädel
Blitzlicht	Diethard Klante	Hans Korte, Louise Martini, Peter Vogel	Science fiction	
The Bloody Vultures of Alaska	Harald Reinl	Doug McClure, Harald Leipnitz, Klaus Löwitsch, Heinz Reincke	Adventure	
Blue Blooms the Gentian	Franz Antel	Ilja Richter, Eddi Arent, Hansi Kraus	Musical comedy	
The Blue Hotel	Stanislav Barabáš	Per Oscarsson, Hans Christian Blech, Arthur Brauss, Martin Lüttge, Tord Peterson, Konrad Georg, Gun Robertson, Tommy Johnson, Anne-Marie Machnow	Drama	West German-Swedish co-production
The Caretaker	August Everding	Heinz Rühmann, Gerd Baltus, Michael Schwarzmaier	Drama	a.k.a. Der Hausmeister
Crazy – Completely Mad	Franz Josef Gottlieb	Rudi Carrell, Georg Thomalla, Cornelia Froboess	Comedy	
Daniel	Pete Ariel	Hans Günter Michelsen	Drama	
Death Under Sail	Oswald Döpke	Charles Régnier, Hannelore Elsner, Axel von Ambesser, Giulia Follina, Gerd Baltus, Volkert Kraeft, Jochen Busse	Mystery	a.k.a. Death on the River Thames
Desaster	Reinhard Hauff	Klaus Löwitsch, Dieter Laser	Crime drama	
The Devil's Disciple	Ludwig Cremer	Heinz Bennent, Werner Kreindl, Charles Régnier	Drama	
Diamantenparty	Joachim Hess	Barbara Rütting, Heidelinde Weis, John van Dreelen, Wolfgang Preiss, Maria Sebaldt, Ralf Wolter, Fritz Muliar	Crime comedy	
Dream City	Johannes Schaaf	Per Oscarsson, Olimpia, Rosemarie Fendel, Louis Waldon, Ron Williams	Drama	
Du stirbst nicht allein – Ein deutscher Kriegspfarrer in Paris	Jürgen Goslar	Udo Vioff, Harald Leipnitz, Wolfgang Preiss	War	
The East Frisian Report	Walter Boos	Josef Moosholzer, Margot Mahler	Sex comedy	
Der Edison von Schöneberg	Erich Neureuther	Friedrich G. Beckhaus, Antje Hagen, Jutta Speidel, Rudolf Schündler, Hans Paetsch, Ulrich Matschoss	Biography	a.k.a. Der Edison von Schöneberg – Hermann Ganswindt
Eigentlich hatte ich Angst ...	Nathan Jariv	Wolfgang Hübsch	War, Drama	a.k.a. Eigentlich hatte ich Angst – Die Geschichte eines ungewöhnlichen Helden
Ein für allemal	Peter Adam	Karin Baal, Georges Claisse, Relja Bašić	Crime	
End of the Line	Ludwig Cremer	Hans Schweikart, Peter Striebeck	Mystery	a.k.a. Endstation
Entziehung – Ein Tagebuch	Ludwig Cremer	Gabriele Wohmann, Heinz Bennent, Herbert Fleischmann	Drama	
The Experts	Norbert Kückelmann	Mathias Eysen, Gisela Fischer, Hans Brenner, Walter Sedlmayr	Drama	Won a Silver Bear at Berlin
Ein Fall für Goron	Oswald Döpke	Hannes Messemer, Hannelore Elsner, Herbert Fleischmann, Diana Körner	Mystery	
Fall nicht in den Schwanensee	Arno Assmann	Helga Anders, Horst Tappert, Gunnar Möller, Dagmar Mettler	Comedy	a.k.a. Chase me, Comrade!
The Fat Woman's Tale	Heinz Schirk	Karin Schlemmer, Alexander May, Luitgard Im	Drama	a.k.a. The Fat Woman's Joke
The First Circle	Aleksander Ford	Gunther Malzacher, Elżbieta Czyżewska, Peter Steen, Vera Tschechowa	Drama	Danish-West German co-production
The Fish Can Sing	Rolf Hädrich	Árni Árnason, Jón Laxdal	Drama	a.k.a. Fischkonzert. Icelandic-West German co-production
Florian	Klaus Emmerich	Jörg Pleva, Elke Aberle	Drama	
The Flying Classroom	Werner Jacobs	Joachim Fuchsberger, Heinz Reincke	Comedy	
Gabriel	Thomas Fantl	Horst Tappert, Susanne Beck, Jörg Pleva, Karl-Georg Saebisch, Christa Berndl	Fantasy	
Das gefährliche Leben	Thomas Land	Ilse Ritter, Günter Strack, Eva Brumby	Crime comedy	a.k.a. Frøken J. oder Das gefährliche Leben
Die geheimen Papiere des Pentagon	Carlheinz Caspari	Gunther Malzacher, Hans Peter Korff, Claus Eberth	Docudrama	
The Girl from Hong Kong	Jürgen Roland	Joachim Fuchsberger, Li Paelz, Grégoire Aslan, Arthur Brauss, Véronique Vendell	Thriller	
Die Gräfin von Rathenow	Peter Beauvais	Doris Kunstmann, Götz George, Hermann Treusch, Helga Anders	Drama	
Hau drauf, Kleiner	May Spils	Werner Enke, Mascha Gonska, Henry van Lyck	Comedy	
Haus am Meer	Reinhard Hauff	Hanna Schygulla, Rolf Becker	Drama	
Housewives on the Job	Ernst Hofbauer	Marie-Georges Pascal, Elisabeth Volkmann, Ingrid Steeger	Sex report film	
Hubertus Castle	Harald Reinl	Robert Hoffmann, Karlheinz Böhm, Carl Lange, Klaus Löwitsch, Gerhard Riedmann, Ute Kittelberger, Gerlinde Döberl, Evelyn Opela	Drama	
I Thought I Was Dead	Wolf Gremm	Y Sa Lo	Drama	a.k.a. I Had a Feeling I Was Dead
Im Angesicht des Todes	Walter Davy	Walter Kohut	War, Biography	a.k.a. Alfred Delp: In the Face of Death. West German-Austrian co-production
Im Reservat	Peter Beauvais	Wolfgang Kieling, Johanna Hofer, Rosemarie Fendel	Drama	
Im Schillingshof	Herbert Ballmann	Evelyn Opela, Joachim Ansorge, Rolf Henniger, Ursela Monn, Dirk Dautzenberg, Folker Bohnet, Hermann Schomberg	Drama	
Im Zeichen der Kälte	Uwe Brandner	Harry Baer, Hans Christian Blech, Judy Winter	Crime	
Immobilien	Otto Jägersberg	Maria Schell, Christine Kaufmann, Karlheinz Böhm, Eva Mattes, Wolfgang Kieling, Siegfried Wischnewski	Drama	
Inferno	Stanislav Barabáš	Per Oscarsson, Christine Buchegger, Marie Versini, Ulla Sjöblom, Georgette Anys, Diana Kjaer, Tommy Johnson, Georg Årlin, Toivo Pawlo, Henry Gilbert	Biography	Swedish-West German-French-Danish-Finnish-Austrian-Norwegian co-production
Invitation to a Beheading	Horst Flick	Wolf Roth, Horst Bollmann, Wolfgang Kieling	Science fiction	
Josef Lang, k. u. k. Scharfrichter	Heinz Schirk	Georg Corten	Biography	
Ein junger Mann aus dem Innviertel – Adolf Hitler	Axel Corti	Franz Trager	Biography, History	Austrian-West German co-production
Karussells werden im Himmel gemacht	Chuck Kerremans	Christian Wolff, Katrin Schaake, Alexander May, Shmuel Rodensky	Comedy	
Kopf oder Zahl	Uwe Brandner	Wolf Martienzen, Ingeborg Schöner, Henry van Lyck	Crime	
Krieg im dritten Stock	Karl Peter Biltz	Paul Edwin Roth	Comedy	a.k.a. Krieg im 3. Stock
Der lange Jammer	Max Willutzki	Heinz Giese, Günther Kieslich, Peter Schlesinger	Docudrama	
The Last Waltz	Fred Kraus	Marika Rökk, Ivan Rebroff, Grit van Jüten, Adolf Dallapozza, Fritz Tillmann, Claus Wilcke	Musical	
A Life	Eberhard Itzenplitz	Matthias Ponnier	Drama	a.k.a. Ein Leben a.k.a. Una Vita
Little Mother	Radley Metzger	Christiane Krüger, Siegfried Rauch, Mark Damon, Ivan Desny, Elga Sorbas, Anton Diffring	Drama	American-West German-Yugoslav co-production
Long Day's Journey into Night	Peter Beauvais	Martin Held, Eva Katharina Schultz, András Fricsay, Gerd Böckmann	Drama	
Love in 3-D	Walter Boos	Ingrid Steeger, Elisabeth Volkmann	Sex comedy	
Love's Labour's Lost	Oswald Döpke	Volkert Kraeft, Christine Merthan, Klaus Schwarzkopf, Eva Mattes, Gerd Baltus, Günter Mack	Comedy	a.k.a. Liebe leidet mit Lust
Mark of the Devil Part II	Adrian Hoven	Anton Diffring, Reggie Nalder	Horror	
Mein Onkel Benjamin	Thomas Engel	Peter Vogel, Inken Sommer, Reinhard Kolldehoff, René Deltgen	Comedy	a.k.a. My Uncle Benjamin
Merry-Go-Round	Otto Schenk	Maria Schneider, Helmut Berger, Senta Berger, Sydne Rome, Erika Pluhar, Helmuth Lohner	Comedy	a.k.a. Dance of Love: La Ronde
My Name is Nobody	Tonino Valerii	Terence Hill, Henry Fonda	Western	Italian-French-West German co-production
Nerze nachts am Straßenrand	Wolfgang Staudte	Peter Eschberg, Witta Pohl, Ruth Hausmeister, Jochen Busse	Crime	
Nestwärme	Eberhard Itzenplitz	Susanne Schaefer, Volkert Kraeft, Matthias Ponnier, Xenia Pörtner, Ulrich Matschoss	Drama	
Nicht einmal das halbe Leben	Franz Peter Wirth	Ingrid Fröhlich, Karl-Heinz von Hassel, Peter Striebeck	Drama	
Nichts als Erinnerung	Michael Kehlmann	Attila Hörbiger, Paula Wessely, Peter Weck, Dagmar Mettler, Kurt Sowinetz	Drama	Austrian-West German co-production
Night Flight from Moscow	Henri Verneuil	Yul Brynner, Henry Fonda, Dirk Bogarde, Philippe Noiret, Michel Bouquet, Martin Held, Virna Lisi, Elga Andersen	Cold War spy film	French-West German-Italian co-production
A Night in Venice	Václav Kašlík	Sylvia Geszty, Julia Migenes, Anton de Ridder, Erich Kunz, Trudeliese Schmidt, Jon Piso	Musical	
Nullpunkt	Rolf Busch	Angelika Bender	Drama	
Old Barge, Young Love	Werner Jacobs	Roy Black, Barbara Nielsen	Musical	
Olifant	Horst Dallmayr	Udo Kier, Vera Tschechowa	Drama	
Once Upon a Time	Rolf Kauka, Roberto Gavioli	—N/a	Animated	West German-Italian co-production
Paganini	Eugen York	Antonio Theba, Teresa Stratas, Johannes Heesters, Dagmar Koller, Peter Kraus	Musical	West German-Austrian co-production
Pan	George Moorse	Louis Waldon, Udo Kier, Evelyn Opela, Gordon Mitchell, Elga Sorbas, Del Negro, Helga Anders, Herbert Fux, Dieter Schidor	Fantasy	
Part-Time Work of a Domestic Slave	Alexander Kluge	Alexandra Kluge	Drama	
The Pedestrian	Maximilian Schell	Gustav Rudolf Sellner, Peter Hall, Gila von Weitershausen, Christian Kohlund	Drama	West German-Swiss-Israeli co-production
The Philanthropist	Erich Neureuther	Peter Vogel, Martin Lüttge, Sabine Sinjen, Verena Buss, Peter Fricke, Hans-Georg Panczak	Drama	
Plaza Fortuna	Wolfgang Liebeneiner	Horst Bollmann, Ferdy Mayne, Herbert Fleischmann	Comedy	
Prozess: Die Meuterei auf der Bounty	Imo Moszkowicz	Wolfgang Wahl, Heinz Baumann, Günter Mack, Ernst Fritz Fürbringer, Friedrich Joloff	History, Docudrama	
Die Reise nach Mallorca	Kurt Wilhelm	Johanna von Koczian, Peter Arens, Evelyn Opela, Susi Nicoletti, Gerhard Riedmann	Comedy	
The Scarlet Letter	Wim Wenders	Senta Berger, Hans Christian Blech, Lou Castel	Drama	West German-Spanish co-production
Scheibenschießen	Erich Neureuther	Erika von Thellmann, Ernst Fritz Fürbringer, Edith Heerdegen, Rose Renée Roth, Heinz Meier	Crime comedy	
Ein Schweizer wie bestellt	Ludwig Cremer	Cordula Trantow, Josef Fröhlich, Ulrich Matschoss	Docudrama, Cold War spy film	
Seven Deaths in the Cat's Eye	Antonio Margheriti	Jane Birkin, Hiram Keller, Doris Kunstmann, Anton Diffring, Konrad Georg, Serge Gainsbourg	Thriller	Italian-French-West German co-production
The Sibyl Cipher	Alfred Vohrer	Harald Leipnitz, Gila von Weitershausen, Nino Castelnuovo, Andrea Jonasson	Thriller	a.k.a. Gott schützt die Liebenden
Sieben Tage	Rainer Erler	Wilfried Klaus, Christel Bodenstein, Günter Strack	Drama	a.k.a. Sieben Tage – Modell einer Krise? a.k.a. 7 Tage
Der Sieger von Tambo	Dietrich Haugk	Joachim Bißmeier, Will Quadflieg, Christine Ostermayer, Hans Brenner, Jürgen Goslar, Walter Kohut, Klaus Höhne, Hartmut Becker	Drama	a.k.a. El día señalado
Sittengemälde	Eberhard Itzenplitz	Hans Brenner, Vérénice Rudolph	Drama	
Smog	Wolfgang Petersen	Marie-Luise Marjan	Disaster	
So'n Theater	Thomas Engel	Theo Lingen, Chariklia Baxevanos, Harald Juhnke	Comedy	
Die Sonne über dem Meer	Werner Schlechte	Arno Assmann, Volker Eckstein, Benno Sterzenbach, Monica Bleibtreu	Drama	a.k.a. Le Soleil sur la mer
Sons and Lovers	Wolfgang Liebeneiner	Wolfram Weniger, Christiane Hörbiger, Anita Lochner, Irmgard Först, Klaus Löwitsch, Heinz Baumann	Drama	a.k.a. Eine egoistische Liebe
Steal the Old Man's Bundle	Oswald Döpke	Shmuel Rodensky, Dieter Schidor	Drama	a.k.a. Rückstände
Steig ein und stirb	Günter Gräwert	Walter Sedlmayr, Peter Drescher, Dagmar Biener	Crime	
Sylvie	Klaus Lemke	Sylvie Winter, Paul Lyss, Del Negro, Ivan Desny	Drama	
The Tenderness of Wolves	Ulli Lommel	Kurt Raab, Margit Carstensen, Ingrid Caven, Brigitte Mira, Wolfgang Schenck	Crime drama, Horror	
Der Tote vom Pont Neuf	Falk Harnack	Heinrich Schweiger, Siegfried Wischnewski	Drama	
Traumtänzer	Vojtěch Jasný	Edith Heerdegen	Drama	
Trip to Vienna	Edgar Reitz	Elke Sommer, Hannelore Elsner, Mario Adorf, Heinz Reincke, Ferdy Mayne	Comedy-drama, War	
Twelfth Night	Otto Schenk	Klaus Maria Brandauer, Helmuth Lohner, Josef Meinrad, Sabine Sinjen, Christiane Hörbiger	Comedy	
The Twins from Immenhof	Wolfgang Schleif	Heidi Brühl, Horst Janson, Olga Chekhova	Comedy	
Über Nacht	Karin Thome	Karin Thome, Werner Penzel, Rudolf Thome	Drama	
Ein unheimlich starker Abgang	Michael Verhoeven	Katja Rupé, Elmar Wepper, Irm Hermann, Hans-Jürgen Bäumler	Drama	a.k.a. Sonja schafft die Wirklichkeit ab oder ... ein unheimlich starker Abgang
Van der Valk und die Reichen	Wolfgang Petersen	Frank Finlay, Françoise Prévost, Judy Winter, Helmut Käutner	Crime	a.k.a. The King of the Rainy Country. West German-French co-production
The Venice Train	Tom Toelle	Herbert Mensching, Ivan Desny	Thriller	a.k.a. Rückfahrt von Venedig
Verurteilt	Otto Jägersberg	Jutta Speidel, Ekkehardt Belle, Beatrice Richter	Crime drama	
Verwandte sind auch Menschen	Wolfgang Liebeneiner	Claus Biederstaedt, Karin Hübner	Comedy	
Victor, or Power to the Children	Tom Toelle	Vadim Glowna, Ulli Philipp, Hans Caninenberg, Günter Mack, Miriam Spoerri, Carl Lange, Dagmar Altrichter	Comedy	
La Victoria	Peter Lilienthal	Paula Moya	Drama	
Vom Hackepeter und der kalten Mamsell	Ilo von Jankó	Herbert Bötticher, Ilse Pagé, Heinz Moog	Crime comedy	
Der Vorgang	Fritz Umgelter	Horst Frank, Klaus Schwarzkopf, Ivan Desny, Rolf Becker, Andrea Dahmen	Thriller	
Weekend im Paradies	Karl Wesseler	Willy Millowitsch, Wolfgang Kieling, Gerlinde Locker, Eva Maria Meineke	Comedy	
Wenn alle anderen fehlen	Fritz Umgelter	Maria Körber	Drama	
Wenn ihr wollt, ist es kein Märchen	Imo Moszkowicz	Pinkas Braun	Biography, History	a.k.a. Wenn ihr wollt, ist es kein Märchen – Theodor Herzl, der Vater des Staates Israel
Wenn jeder Tag ein Sonntag wär	Harald Vock	Ireen Sheer, Chris Roberts, Georg Thomalla	Musical comedy	
Wienerinnen	Dietrich Haugk	Klaus Maria Brandauer, Helma Gautier, Nina Sandt	Comedy	Austrian-West German co-production
Willow Springs	Werner Schroeter	Magdalena Montezuma, Christine Kaufmann	Drama	
Die Wohngenossin	Nikos Perakis	Giulia Follina, Martin Lüttge	Drama	
World on a Wire	Rainer Werner Fassbinder	Klaus Löwitsch, Mascha Rabben, Barbara Valentin, Ivan Desny, Günter Lamprecht, Gottfried John, Heinz Meier	Thriller, Science fiction	TV film
Yankee Dudler	Volker Vogeler	Arthur Brauss, Geraldine Chaplin, William Berger, Eduardo Fajardo, Fred Stillkrauth	Western	a.k.a. Jaider's Gang. West German-Spanish co-production
Zahltag	Hans Noever	André Rouyer	Crime	
Der Zarewitsch	Arthur Maria Rabenalt	Wiesław Ochman, Teresa Stratas, Harald Juhnke	Musical	
Zinksärge für die Goldjungen	Jürgen Roland	Henry Silva, Herbert Fleischmann, Horst Janson, Véronique Vendell, Raf Baldassarre	Crime	West German-Italian co-production
Zu einem Mord gehören zwei	Rainer Wolffhardt	Dieter Kirchlechner, Maria Sebaldt, Günter Mack	Crime	
Der Zweck heiligt die Mittel	Fritz Umgelter	Jörg Pleva, Joachim Kerzel	Thriller	

== 1974 ==
Title	Director	Cast	Genre	Notes
Die 7-Tage-Woche des Drahtwebers Rolf Piechotta	Rainer Boldt	Karl-Heinz Walther, Gert Günther Hoffmann, Diether Krebs	Drama	
Ein Abend, eine Nacht, ein Morgen	Ludwig Cremer	Doris Kunstmann, Peter Mosbacher, Anne-Marie Blanc	Drama	
Abschied vom Abschied	Frank Guthke	Iris Berben	Drama	
The Affair of the Poisons	Imo Moszkowicz	Ursula Lingen, Louise Martini, Michael Degen, Romuald Pekny, Richard Lauffen	History	a.k.a. Gift-Affäre
After Liverpool	Michael Haneke	Dieter Kirchlechner, Hildegard Schmahl	Drama	a.k.a. ... und was kommt danach?
Ali: Fear Eats the Soul	Rainer Werner Fassbinder	Brigitte Mira, El Hedi ben Salem, Barbara Valentin	Drama	
Alice in the Cities	Wim Wenders	Rüdiger Vogler, Yella Rottländer, Lisa Kreuzer	Drama	
Alpha und Asphalt	Frank Guthke	Christiane Krüger	Science fiction	
Alpine Glow in Dirndlrock	Sigi Rothemund	Elisabeth Volkmann, Rinaldo Talamonti	Sex comedy	a.k.a. Alpine Passion a.k.a. Stop It – I Like It
Am Morgen meines Todes	Oswald Döpke	Werner Kreindl, Heinz Meier, Rosemarie Fendel	Drama	
Die Ameisen kommen	Jochen Richter	Marc Porel, Ferdy Mayne, Belinda Mayne	Crime	
And Then There Were None	Peter Collinson	Charles Aznavour, Stéphane Audran, Elke Sommer, Gert Fröbe, Herbert Lom, Oliver Reed, Richard Attenborough, Adolfo Celi	Mystery thriller	British-Spanish-French-Italian-West German co-production
Anna	Uschi Reich	Helga Anders, Nicolas Brieger, Hans Peter Cloos	Drama	
Arme klauen nicht	Claus Peter Witt	Gerd Baltus	Drama	
Auch ich war nur ein mittelmäßiger Schüler	Werner Jacobs	Georg Thomalla, Horst Tappert, Detlev Eckstein, Bernd Herberger, Jutta Speidel, Christiane Krüger	Comedy	
Aufs Kreuz gelegt	Wolfgang Petersen	Olga Karlatos, Reiner Schöne, Dieter Kirchlechner, Grégoire Aslan	Adventure	
Auguste Bolte	Gerd Winkler	Cornelia Froboess	Comedy	
Bauernbarock	Werner Schlechte	Gustl Bayrhammer, Hans Baur, Walter Kohut, Michaela May	Comedy	
The Beaux' Stratagem	Wilm ten Haaf	Claudia Wedekind, Christine Wodetzky, Heinz Ehrenfreund, Peter Fricke, Helmut Förnbacher	Comedy	a.k.a. Strategen der Liebe
Bismarck von hinten oder Wir schließen nie	Joachim Hess	Hans Jürgen Diedrich, Uwe Dallmeier, Jón Laxdal	Comedy	
Ein bißchen Liebe	Veith von Fürstenberg	Burghard Schlicht, Brigitte Berger, Gregor von Rezzori	Comedy	
The Broken Jug	Franz Peter Wirth	Wolfgang Reichmann	Comedy	a.k.a. Der zerbrochene Krug
The Catamount Killing	Krzysztof Zanussi	Horst Buchholz, Ann Wedgeworth	Crime	a.k.a. Lohngelder für Pittsville
Cautio Criminalis	Hagen Mueller-Stahl	Gerd Böckmann, Horst Frank, Doris Schade, Gaby Dohm, Kurt Meisel, Walter Buschhoff, Paul Verhoeven	History	a.k.a. Cautio Criminalis oder Der Hexenanwalt
Chapeau Claque	Ulrich Schamoni	Ulrich Schamoni, Anna Henkel	Comedy	
Charley's Nieces	Walter Boos	Josef Moosholzer, Elisabeth Volkmann	Comedy	
Charlotte	Roger Vadim	Sirpa Lane, Roger Vadim, Mathieu Carrière	Thriller	French-Italian-West German co-production
Class Reunion	Eberhard Itzenplitz	Hans Jaray, Heinz Moog, Bruno Dallansky, Peter Faerber, Jan Christian	Drama	a.k.a. Der Abituriententag
Countess Mariza	Eugen York	Erzsébet Házy, René Kollo, Dagmar Koller	Musical	a.k.a. Countess Maritza
Dandelions	Adrian Hoven	Rutger Hauer, Dagmar Lassander	Drama	a.k.a. Hard to Remember a.k.a. Diary of a Lover
Dead Pigeon on Beethoven Street	Samuel Fuller	Glenn Corbett, Anton Diffring, Christa Lang, Stéphane Audran, Sieghardt Rupp	Crime	Produced as a Tatort episode
Death in Astapovo	Günter Gräwert	Hans Christian Blech, Gisela Stein, Wolfgang Wahl, Mathieu Carrière	Biography	a.k.a. Tod in Astapowo – Die Ehe von Leo und Sophia Tolstoi
Diary of a Madman	Franz Josef Wild	Carl-Heinz Schroth	Drama	
The Difficult Man	Stanislav Barabáš	Wolfgang Gasser, Erika Pluhar, Doris Kunstmann	Comedy	a.k.a. An Impossible Man a.k.a. Der Schwierige
Diplomatic Baggage	Arno Assmann	Gunnar Möller, Wolfgang Kieling, Wolfgang Preiss, Elke Aberle, Heidi Stroh, Karin Eickelbaum	Comedy	
Don't Start Without Me	Wolfgang Spier	Horst Janson, Monika Lundi, Simone Rethel, Stefan Behrens	Comedy	a.k.a. Früher oder später
Dorothea's Revenge	Peter Fleischmann	Anna Henkel	Drama	West German-French co-production
Dschungelmädchen für zwei Halunken	Ernst Hofbauer	Alberto Dell'Acqua, Wolf Goldan	Adventure, Comedy	West German-Italian co-production
Du Land der Liebe	Rolf von Sydow	Rudolf Fernau, Herbert Fleischmann	Drama	
Effi Briest	Rainer Werner Fassbinder	Hanna Schygulla, Wolfgang Schenck, Ulli Lommel	Drama	
Eiger	Dieter Wedel	Hans Brenner, Herbert Stass, Werner Asam, Jörg Pleva, Martin Sperr, Claus Eberth	Drama	
Das einsame Haus	Thomas Fantl	Hans Christian Blech, Jörg Pleva	Thriller	
Eintausend Milliarden	Dieter Wedel	Martin Benrath, Klaus Schwarzkopf, Peter Ehrlich, Gisela Stein, Herbert Bötticher, Katrin Schaake, Günter Strack	Docudrama	a.k.a. 1000 Milliarden
Elfmeter! Elfmeter!	Theo Mezger	Manfred Guthke, Elke Aberle, Harry Wüstenhagen	Comedy, Sport	
Die Eltern	Hans W. Geißendörfer	Anne Bennent, Barbara Rütting, Henri Serre, Heinz Bennent	Drama	
The Enigma of Kaspar Hauser	Werner Herzog	Bruno S., Walter Ladengast, Brigitte Mira, Willy Semmelrogge, Alfred Edel	Historical drama	a.k.a. Every Man for Himself and God Against All
Ermittlungen gegen Unbekannt	Roland Gall	Vadim Glowna, Dieter Laser	Drama	
Eskalation	Claus Peter Witt	Jan Groth	Crime	
Fliegen und Stürzen	Eberhard Pieper	Cordula Trantow, Hans-Michael Rehberg	War, Biography	a.k.a. Fliegen und Stürzen – Porträt der Melitta Schiller-Stauffenberg
Ein fröhliches Dasein	Wolfgang Staudte	Robert Wolfgang Schnell, Lotti Krekel, Ian MacNaughton	Comedy	
Fusion	Nathan Jariv	Nicole Heesters, Ulrich Matschoss	Comedy	
Ein ganz perfektes Ehepaar	Ula Stöckl	Doris Kunstmann, Gerd Baltus, Hans Peter Hallwachs	Drama	
Geliebte Dame	Hans Dieter Schwarze	Martin Lüttge, Claudia Wedekind, Giulia Follina, Erik Schumann	Comedy	
Goodbye with Mums	Florian Furtwängler	Christine Kaufmann, Liesbeth List, Klaus Grünberg	Drama	a.k.a. Zum Abschied Chrysanthemen
Goldfüchse	Kurt Wilhelm	Henner Quest, Felix von Manteuffel, Lisa Fitz	Crime comedy	
Griseldis	Peter Beauvais	Sabine Sinjen, Klaus Barner	Drama	
Gypsy Love	Václav Kašlík	Janet Perry, Ion Buzea, Adolf Dallapozza, Colette Lorand	Musical	a.k.a. Gipsy Love
Hase und Igel	Ula Stöckl	Claudia Rückert	Comedy	
Der hessische Tartüff	Gedeon Kovács	Herbert Mensching, Richard Münch, Petra Maria Grühn, Lina Carstens	Comedy	a.k.a. The Hessian Tartuffe
Hochzeitsnacht im Paradies	Thomas Engel	Johannes Heesters, Karin Dor, Theo Lingen, Uwe Friedrichsen, Marlene Charell, Barbara Schöne, Gunther Philipp	Musical	a.k.a. Wedding Night in Paradise
The Hunter of Fall	Harald Reinl	Siegfried Rauch, Alexander Stephan, Gerlinde Döberl, Klaus Löwitsch, Beppo Brem, Rudolf Prack	Drama	
Ich gehe nach München	Oswald Döpke	Sabine von Maydell, Dieter Borsche	Drama	
Im Schatten	Diethard Klante	Edith Heerdegen, Dieter Kirchlechner, Witta Pohl	Drama	
Im Vorhof der Wahrheit	Fritz Umgelter	Matthias Habich, Gerhard Acktun	Crime	
In Danger and Deep Distress, the Middleway Spells Certain Death	Alexander Kluge, Edgar Reitz	Jutta Winkelmann, Dagmar Bödderich	Drama	
In the Name of the People	Ottokar Runze		Documentary	
The Infernal Trio	Francis Girod	Romy Schneider, Michel Piccoli, Mascha Gonska, Andréa Ferréol	Black comedy	French-West German-Italian co-production
Julia	Sigi Rothemund	Sylvia Kristel, Jean-Claude Bouillon, Teri Tordai, Ekkehardt Belle	Sex comedy	
Der junge Roth	Rainer Wolffhardt	Gerhard Dressel	Drama	
Karl May	Hans-Jürgen Syberberg	Helmut Käutner, Kristina Söderbaum, Käthe Gold, Lil Dagover	Biography	
Kein Grund zur Unruhe	Peter F. Bringmann	Heinrich Giskes, Hans Peter Hallwachs, Charles Brauer	Drama	
Die Kriegsbraut	Tom Toelle	Donata Höffer, Volkert Kraeft, Eva Christian, Wolfgang Preiss	Drama, War	
Die Kugel war Zeuge	Rainer Söhnlein	Werner Kreindl, Heinz Meier, Hans Putz, Karl-Heinz Hess, Martin Lüttge, Gert Haucke	Crime, Docudrama	
Der Kulterer	Vojtěch Jasný	Helmut Qualtinger	Drama	West German-Austrian co-production
Die Kurpfuscherin	Ludwig Cremer	Maria Schell	Crime	
Lacombe, Lucien	Louis Malle	Pierre Blaise, Aurore Clément, Therese Giehse, Holger Löwenadler	Drama, War	French-Italian-West German co-production
The Land of Smiles	Arthur Maria Rabenalt	René Kollo, Birgit Sarata, Dagmar Koller, Heinz Zednik	Musical	
The Last Days of Gomorrah	Helma Sanders-Brahms	Mascha Rabben, Matthias Fuchs, Ernst Jacobi	Science fiction	
Lisa	Rolf Busch	Eva Pflug	Drama	a.k.a. Lisa – Aus dem Leben einer Unentbehrlichen
The Little Black Book	Dietrich Haugk	Heinz Bennent, Silvia Lukan	Comedy	a.k.a. Ich suche Herrn Obolsky
Der Lord von Barmbeck	Ottokar Runze	Martin Lüttge, Judy Winter, Inken Sommer	Crime	
Der Macher	Werner Schlechte	Wolfgang Kieling	Comedy	a.k.a. Der Macher oder Warten auf Godeau a.k.a. Mercadet Le Faiseur
Madame Pompadour	Eugen York	Ingeborg Hallstein, Julia Migenes, Adolf Dallapozza, Hans Clarin	Musical	
Made in Germany and USA	Rudolf Thome	Karin Thome, Eberhard Klasse	Drama	
The Man Who Conquered Death	Hans Hollmann	Bruno Hübner	Drama	a.k.a. Der Tod des Kleinbürgers. Austrian-West German co-production
Mari	George Moorse	Y Sa Lo, Werner Hinz	Drama	
Maria Magdalena	Franz Xaver Kroetz	Gisela Schneeberger, Hans Brenner, Ruth Drexel	Drama	
Martha	Rainer Werner Fassbinder	Margit Carstensen, Karlheinz Böhm	Drama	TV film
The Martyr	Aleksander Ford	Leo Genn	Drama, War	a.k.a. You Are Free, Dr. Korczak. West German-Israeli co-production
Mary, Mary	Ludwig Cremer	Heidelinde Weis, Martin Benrath, Karin Anselm, Heinz Baumann	Comedy	a.k.a. Nie wieder Mary
Der Mensch Adam Deigl und die Obrigkeit	Rainer Wolffhardt	Willy Harlander, Gustl Bayrhammer	Crime drama	
The Moonstone	Wilhelm Semmelroth	Anita Lochner, Stefan Behrens, Theo Lingen, Werner Kreindl, Ulli Philipp, Paul Dahlke, Anneliese Uhlig, Helmut Förnbacher	Mystery	a.k.a. Der Monddiamant
Nebel	Korbinian Köberle	Wolfgang Engels, Günter Mack	Comedy	
Neugierig wie ein Kind	Oswald Döpke	Sabine von Maydell, Matthias Habich, Rosemarie Fendel, Günter Strack	Drama	
No Gold for a Dead Diver	Harald Reinl	Horst Janson, Monika Lundi, Marius Weyers, Sandra Prinsloo, Hans Hass Jr.	Adventure	a.k.a. Deadly Jaws
No Sin on the Alpine Pastures	Franz Josef Gottlieb	Alena Penz, Alexander Grill, Rinaldo Talamonti	Sex comedy	
Nora Helmer	Rainer Werner Fassbinder	Margit Carstensen, Joachim Hansen, Ulli Lommel, Barbara Valentin, Klaus Löwitsch	Drama	
Nur eine Affäre	Ludwig Cremer	Karl Michael Vogler, Anita Lochner	Drama	a.k.a. The Better It Looks, the Worse It Is
The Odessa File	Ronald Neame	Jon Voight, Maximilian Schell, Maria Schell, Klaus Löwitsch, Günter Strack, Hannes Messemer	Thriller	British-West German co-production
One or the Other of Us	Wolfgang Petersen	Jürgen Prochnow, Klaus Schwarzkopf, Elke Sommer	Thriller	
Only the Wind Knows the Answer	Alfred Vohrer	Maurice Ronet, Marthe Keller, Raymond Pellegrin, Karin Dor, Anton Diffring	Thriller	West German-French co-production . Entered into the 9th Moscow International Film Festival
Output	Michael Fengler	Lou Castel, Katja Rupé, Bernd Herberger, Claus Eberth, Marquard Bohm	Crime	a.k.a. A Dead One In Berlin
Der Pendler	Hartmut Griesmayr	Nicolas Brieger	Drama	a.k.a. The Commuter
Perahim – die zweite Chance	Hans W. Geißendörfer	Heinz Bennent, Leon Askin, Richard Münch	Crime	
Plus minus null	Franz Peter Wirth	Horst Tappert, Anaid Iplicjian, Rolf Becker	Drama	
Die preußische Heirat	Helmut Käutner	Claudia Butenuth, Carl Raddatz, Edwin Noël, Dagmar Altrichter, Gerd Böckmann	Comedy, Biography	a.k.a. Zopf und Schwert
Die Rache	Heinz Schirk	Peter Mosbacher, Arno Assmann	Crime drama	
Die Reform	Erich Neureuther	Walter Sedlmayr, Max Grießer	Comedy	
Revenge of the East Frisians	Walter Boos	Alexandra Bogojevic, Josef Moosholzer, Helga Feddersen	Sex comedy	
The Robber Hotzenplotz	Gustav Ehmck	Gert Fröbe, Lina Carstens, Rainer Basedow, Josef Meinrad	Family	
Rosenmontag	Peter Beauvais	Günter Lamprecht	Drama	
Schattenreiter	George Moorse	Angelika Bender, Dieter Schidor, Alexander May	Drama	
Der Scheck heiligt die Mittel	Peter Schulze-Rohr	Richard Suskind, Horst Frank, Judy Winter	Docudrama, Crime comedy	
Schwarzwaldfahrt aus Liebeskummer	Werner Jacobs	Roy Black, Barbara Nielsen, Heidi Hansen, Elke Aberle	Musical	
Sechs Wochen im Leben der Brüder G.	Peter Beauvais	Hans-Georg Panczak, Jan Kollwitz, Renate Küster	Drama	a.k.a. 6 Wochen im Leben der Brüder G.
Selbstbildnis Béatrice S.	Rainer Wolffhardt	Béatrice Schweizer, Werner Kreindl, Dieter Kirchlechner	Docudrama	
Silverson	Falk Harnack	Herbert Bötticher, Ernst Schröder, Gracia-Maria Kaus, Johanna Elbauer, Godfrey Quigley, Agnes Bernelle	Crime	
Snowdrops Bloom in September	Christian Ziewer	Claus Eberth	Drama	
Der Springteufel	Heinz Schirk	Dieter Hallervorden, Arno Assmann	Thriller	TV film based on story by Derrick Sherwin (Doctor Who)
Spring in Immenhof	Wolfgang Schleif	Heidi Brühl, Horst Janson, Olga Chekhova	Comedy	
Stayover in Tyrol	Volker Schlöndorff	Margarethe von Trotta, Heinrich Schweiger, Reinhard Hauff, Herbert Achternbusch	Drama	
Stolen Heaven	Theo Maria Werner	Siegfried Rauch, Hans Holt, Christine Böhm	Drama	
Stress	Rolf Busch	Günter Mack	Drama	
Supermarket	Roland Klick	Charly Wierczejewski, Eva Mattes, Michael Degen, Walter Kohut, Hans-Michael Rehberg	Crime drama	
Tausend Francs Belohnung	Günter Gräwert	Horst Bollmann, Horst Frank, Mathieu Carrière, Simone Rethel, Fritz Rasp, Ferdy Mayne, Claus Biederstaedt	Drama	a.k.a. 1000 Francs Belohnung a.k.a. Reward: 1000 Francs
Three Men in the Snow	Alfred Vohrer	Klaus Schwarzkopf, Roberto Blanco, Thomas Fritsch, Susanne Beck, Grit Boettcher, Herbert Fleischmann	Comedy	
Der Tod der Schneevögel	Eberhard Itzenplitz	Wolfgang Wahl, Nicolas Brieger, William Ray, Olivia Molina, Facio Santillan, Günther Kaufmann, Robertson White, Peter Schiff, Hansi Jochmann	Thriller	
Tod eines Mannequins	Jörg A. Eggers	Franziska Bronnen, Werner Bruhns	Drama	
Torrents of Spring	Vojtěch Jasný	Senta Berger, Dan Mastacan, Claude Dauphin	Drama	
Ulla oder Die Flucht in die schwarzen Wälder	Herbert Vesely	Jörg Pleva, Iris Berben	Fantasy	
Eine ungeliebte Frau	Tom Toelle	Ulli Philipp, Christian Wolff, Wolfgang Preiss, Edda Seippel, Diana Körner, Helmut Förnbacher	Drama	
Unser Werk	Hans Rolf Strobel	Hanna Schygulla, Mathias Eysen, Henning Gissel	Drama	
Urlaub zur Beerdigung	Michael Günther	Alexander May, Uta Hallant, Herbert Stass, Friedhelm Ptok	Drama	
Der Verfolger	Falk Harnack	Gerd Böckmann	Drama	a.k.a. The Pursuer
Der Verrat	Lutz Büscher	Andrea L'Arronge, Kai Fischer, Hans Helmut Dickow, Herbert Bötticher, Irene Marhold, Horst Michael Neutze	Cold War spy film	a.k.a. Pack of Lies a.k.a. Act of Betrayal
Die Verrohung des Franz Blum	Reinhard Hauff	Jürgen Prochnow, Burkhard Driest, Eike Gallwitz, Tilo Prückner	Crime drama	
The Villa of Madame Vidac	Karlheinz Bieber	Wolfgang Kieling, Claudia Wedekind, Inken Sommer	Black comedy	
Vreemde Wêreld	Jürgen Goslar	Sandra Prinsloo, Wolfgang Kieling, Marius Weyers	Thriller	a.k.a. Listen to My Story a.k.a. Und die Nacht kennt kein Erbarmen. South African-West German co-production
Wages and Love	Marianne Lüdcke, Ingo Kratisch	Erika Skrotzki, Evelyn Meyka, Dagmar Biener, Elfriede Irrall, Hans Peter Hallwachs, Nicolas Brieger	Drama	
Wandas Paradies	Christa Maar	Katja Rupé	Drama	
Ward No. 6	Karl Fruchtmann	Helmut Qualtinger, Stefan Wigger, Karl-Georg Saebisch, Gert Haucke	Drama	a.k.a. Krankensaal 6
The Wayward Saint	Korbinian Köberle	Heinz Schacht, Jutta Speidel, Peter Mosbacher, Karl Walter Diess	Comedy	a.k.a. Der widerspenstige Heilige
Wecken Sie Madame nicht auf	Willi Schmidt	Peter Mosbacher, Loni von Friedl, Krista Keller, Elisabeth Flickenschildt	Comedy	a.k.a. Don't Awaken Madame
Wer stirbt schon gerne unter Palmen	Alfred Vohrer	Maria Gudy, Thomas Hunter, Hannes Messemer, Glauco Onorato, Sieghardt Rupp	Drama	a.k.a. Death Among the Palmtrees
When Mother Went on Strike	Eberhard Schröder	Peter Hall, Gila von Weitershausen, Johanna Matz	Comedy	
Zerfall einer Großfamilie	Rainer Wolffhardt	Donata Höffer, Katrin Schaake, Christoph Felsenstein, Henning Gissel, Joachim Kerzel	Drama	
Zinngeschrei	Ludwig Cremer	Fritz Wepper, Wolf Roth, Peter Mosbacher, Ernst Fritz Fürbringer, Judy Winter, Gert Haucke	Drama	
Zündschnüre	Reinhard Hauff	Michael Bröhland-Olbrich, Kurt Funk, Bettina Porsch, Thomas Visser, Tilli Breidenbach, Christine Wodetzky, Heinz Meier	War	
Zwei himmlische Dickschädel	Werner Jacobs	Reiner Schöne, Klaus Löwitsch	Comedy	
Zwei Tage fürs Leben	Rainer Boldt	Wolfgang Wiehe, Andrea Klinge	Drama	a.k.a. Two Days for Life

== 1975 ==
Title	Director	Cast	Genre	Notes
6 Zimmer Sonnenseite	Rolf von Sydow	Christine Wodetzky, Udo Vioff	Comedy	a.k.a. 6 Rms Riv Vu
Abschiedsparty	Nathan Jariv	Gracia-Maria Kaus, Bruno Dietrich, Konrad Georg, Karl Walter Diess, Wolfgang Condrus	Drama	a.k.a. Office Party
Alexander März	Vojtěch Jasný	Ernst Jacobi, Michael Hinz, Susanne Schaefer	Drama	a.k.a. Das Leben des schizophrenen Dichters Alexander März
Der Alte	Rainer Wolffhardt	Herbert Stass, Claus Theo Gärtner	Drama	
Das Andechser Gefühl	Herbert Achternbusch	Herbert Achternbusch, Margarethe von Trotta	Drama	a.k.a. The Andechs Feeling
Das Anhängsel	Peter Schulze-Rohr	Marianne Nentwich, Karl-Heinz Vosgerau, Christian Quadflieg	Drama	a.k.a. The Compliment
Anna and Edith	Gerrit Neuhaus	Barbara Stanek, Karin Siefarth	Drama	
The Beaver Coat	Franz Peter Wirth	Doris Schade, Wolfgang Reichmann, Paul Dahlke, Gerd Böckmann	Comedy	
La belle Hélène	Axel von Ambesser	Anna Moffo, René Kollo, Josef Meinrad, Ivan Rebroff	Opera	West German-Austrian co-production
Berlinger	Alf Brustellin, Bernhard Sinkel	Martin Benrath, Hannelore Elsner, Peter Ehrlich, Tilo Prückner	Drama, War	a.k.a. The Outsider
Black Moon	Louis Malle	Cathryn Harrison, Therese Giehse, Alexandra Stewart, Joe Dallesandro	Science fiction	French-West German co-production
Die Brücke von Zupanja	Harald Philipp	Heinz Weiss, Christian Kohlund, Sascha Hehn	War	
By Hook or by Crook	Hartmut Bitomsky	Jo Bolling, Christine Kaufmann, Lisa Kreuzer	Drama	a.k.a. Auf Biegen oder Brechen
Calm Prevails Over the Country	Peter Lilienthal	Charles Vanel, Mario Pardo, Zita Duarte, Henriqueta Maya	Drama	
The Cats' Bridge	Peter Meincke	Jan Niklas, Hanna Schygulla, Paul Dahlke, Charles Régnier	Drama	a.k.a. Der Katzensteg
La Chair de l'orchidée	Patrice Chéreau	Charlotte Rampling, Bruno Cremer, Hans Christian Blech, Simone Signoret	Thriller	a.k.a. The Flesh of the Orchid. French-Italian-West German co-production
Change	Bernd Fischerauer	Reiner Schöne, Sylvia Manas, Raymond Pellegrin, Maria Schell, Alexander Wagner	Drama	Austrian-West German co-production
Cold Blood	Ralf Gregan, Günter Vaessen	Rutger Hauer, Vera Tschechowa, Horst Frank, Walter Richter	Crime	
Comenius	Stanislav Barabáš	Thomas Holtzmann, Traugott Buhre, Evelyn Opela, Charles Régnier, Günter Strack, Friedrich von Ledebur, Paul Verhoeven	Drama	
The Concert	Dietrich Haugk	Maria Schell, Klaus Maria Brandauer, Walther Reyer	Comedy	
The Condemned	Axel Corti	Klaus Rott, Sylvia Haider	Drama	a.k.a. Der Sohn eines Landarbeiters wird Bauarbeiter und baut sich ein Haus a.k.a. Totstellen. Austrian-West German co-production
Countess Mizzi	Otto Schenk	Christine Ostermayer, Romuald Pekny, Karl Schönböck	Comedy	a.k.a. Komtesse Mizzi. Austrian-West German co-production
Crabs on the Island	Gerhard Schmidt	Gerd Baltus, Margot Werner, Hans Korte, Wolfgang Preiss	Science fiction	a.k.a. The Island of the Crabs
Crime After School	Alfred Vohrer	Herbert Fleischmann, Teri Tordai, Evelyne Kraft, Sascha Hehn	Crime drama, Anthology	
Crime and Passion	Ivan Passer	Omar Sharif, Karen Black, Bernhard Wicki, Joseph Bottoms	Thriller	West German-American co-production
Damals wie heute	Wolfgang Spier	Gustav Knuth, Klaus Schwarzkopf, Ulli Philipp, Walter Richter, Barbara Schöne, Theo Lingen	Musical	
The Day That Shook the World	Veljko Bulajić	Christopher Plummer, Florinda Bolkan, Maximilian Schell	History	Yugoslav-Czechoslovak-Hungarian-West German co-production
Depression	Herbert Vesely	Doris Kunstmann, Herbert Bötticher	Drama	
Ein deutsches Attentat	Günter Gräwert	Vadim Glowna, Hans Helmut Dickow, Marius Müller-Westernhagen, Wolfgang Büttner	Historical drama	
Diary	Rudolf Thome	Cynthia Beatt, Rudolf Thome, Angelika Kettelhack, Holger Henze	Drama	
Ein Dienstverhältnis	Hartmut Kunz	Hans Brenner, Ruth Drexel	Drama	a.k.a. The Maid's Shoes
Don Juan in Hell	Ludwig Cremer	Martin Benrath, Hans Christian Blech, Johanna von Koczian, Paul Hoffmann	Comedy	
Double-Barrel	Marcel Cravenne	Frank Finlay, Françoise Prévost, Hans Christian Blech, Odile Versois	Crime	a.k.a. Le Bouc émissaire a.k.a. Van der Valk und die Toten. French-West German co-production
Earthquake in Chile	Helma Sanders-Brahms	Julia Peña, Víctor Alcázar	Drama	
Der Edelweißkönig	Alfred Vohrer	Robert Hoffmann, Adrian Hoven, Ute Kittelberger, Alexander Stephan, Gisela Uhlen	Drama	
End of the Game	Maximilian Schell	Martin Ritt, Jon Voight, Robert Shaw, Jacqueline Bisset, Helmut Qualtinger, Gabriele Ferzetti	Mystery	a.k.a. The Judge and His Hangman. West German-Italian co-production
Erziehung durch Dienstmädchen	Klaus Emmerich	Claudius Kracht, Vera Borek, Rolf Becker, Rüdiger Kirschstein, Franz Rudnick, Harald Kuhlmann, Günter Strack	Drama	a.k.a. Education by Maids
Es fängt ganz harmlos an	Eberhard Pieper	Helmut Griem, Wolfgang Kieling, Cordula Trantow, Rudolf Schündler	Docudrama, Anthology	
Euridice BA 2037	Nikos Nikolaidis	Vera Tschechowa, John Moore, Niki Triantafillidi	Drama	Greek-West German co-production
Evas Rippe	Peter Beauvais	Renate Küster, Gisela Trowe, Witta Pohl	Science fiction	
Fear Is a Second Shadow	Norbert Kückelmann	Astrid Fournell, Günther Maria Halmer, Gertrud Kückelmann	Drama	
Fear of Fear	Rainer Werner Fassbinder	Margit Carstensen	Drama	
Die Fernsehliga	Peter Behle	Hanns Joachim Friedrichs	Science fiction, Sport	
Filmriss	Hans Bachmüller	Michael Degen	Crime drama	a.k.a. Filmriß
Fiesco; or The Genoese Conspiracy	Franz Peter Wirth	Klaus Maria Brandauer, Senta Berger, Christine Buchegger, Rudolf Fernau	Drama	a.k.a. Fiesco's Conspiracy at Genoa
Der fliegende Holländer	Václav Kašlík	Donald McIntyre, Catarina Ligendza, Bengt Rundgren, Hermann Winkler	Opera	
Flirt von gestern	Oswald Döpke	Heinz Drache, Hanne Wieder, Gertrud Kückelmann, Margot Hielscher, Siegfried Wischnewski, Robert Owens, Hilde Weissner	Comedy	a.k.a. The One and Only
Fox and His Friends	Rainer Werner Fassbinder	Rainer Werner Fassbinder, Peter Chatel, Karlheinz Böhm, Adrian Hoven	Drama	
Frag nach bei Casanova	Peter Eschberg	Klaus Maria Brandauer, Romuald Pekny, Christine Wodetzky, Herlinde Latzko	Comedy	
Frau Luna	Eugen York	Stefan Behrens, Ingeborg Hallstein, Willi Brokmeier, Harald Juhnke	Musical	
Frau von Bebenburg	Eberhard Itzenplitz	Judy Winter, Matthias Ponnier	Drama	a.k.a. The Second
The Garbage Dump	Rainer Erler	Ekkehardt Belle, Angelika Bender, Cordula Trantow, Bruni Löbel, Hans Hermann Schaufuß, Willy Semmelrogge	Science fiction, Disaster	a.k.a. The Rubbish Tip a.k.a. Die Halde
A Genius, Two Partners and a Dupe	Damiano Damiani	Terence Hill, Patrick McGoohan, Miou-Miou, Robert Charlebois, Klaus Kinski, Raimund Harmstorf	Western, Comedy	Italian-French-West German co-production
Georgina's Reasons	Volker Schlöndorff	Edith Clever, Joachim Bißmeier, Margarethe von Trotta, Eva Maria Meineke	Drama	French-West German co-production
Die Gewehre der Frau Carrar	Egon Monk	Hanne Hiob, Gottfried Kramer, Ernst Jacobi, Therese Giehse	Drama	a.k.a. Señora Carrar's Rifles
Glückliche Reise	Eugen York	Heidi Brühl, Cornelia Froboess, Reiner Schöne, Marlene Charell, Barbara Schöne	Musical	a.k.a. Bon Voyage
Gnadenbrot	Diethard Klante	Donata Höffer, Hans Quest, Udo Vioff, Walter Kohut	Drama	a.k.a. Fortune's Fool
The Great Ecstasy of Woodcarver Steiner	Werner Herzog		Documentary, Sport	
Hahnenkampf	Lutz Büscher	Walter Sedlmayr, Hans Brenner, Vérénice Rudolph	Comedy	
A Happy Family Life	Marianne Lüdcke, Ingo Kratisch	Tilo Prückner, Dagmar Biener	Drama	a.k.a. Familienglück a.k.a. Family Bliss
Heiratskandidaten	Klaus Emmerich	Kyra Mladeck, Klaus Herm, Marianne Hoppe, Wilhelm Borchert	Drama	
Henry IV	Werner Schlechte	Wolfgang Reichmann, Michael Hinz, Peter Mosbacher, Walter Rilla	Drama	a.k.a. König Heinrich IV.
Die Herausforderung	Michael Verhoeven	Heidemarie Hatheyer, René Deltgen	Drama	
Herbstzeitlosen	Dagmar Damek	Doris Kunstmann, Horst Frank, Nicolas Brieger	Drama	
Herr Pitzelberger gibt sich die Ehre	Theodor Grädler	Willy Millowitsch, Hildegard Heichele, Erik Geisen, Ferry Gruber	Musical comedy	a.k.a. M. Choufleuri restera chez lui le...
Hilde Breitner	Peter Beauvais	Margret Homeyer	Drama	
Hugs and Other Things	Jochen Richter	Sydne Rome, Jean-Pierre Léaud, Anny Duperey, Alfred Edel, Marquard Bohm	Crime comedy	a.k.a. Embraces
I'd Like to Have My Troubles	Wolf Gremm	Y Sa Lo, Otto Sander, Evelyn Künneke, Angelika Milster	Musical	a.k.a. I Want My Troubles
Ice Age	Peter Zadek	O. E. Hasse, Ulrich Wildgruber, Heinz Bennent, Hannelore Hoger, Helmut Qualtinger	Drama	Entered into the 25th Berlin International Film Festival
Ich denk' mich tritt ein Pferd	Theo Maria Werner	Uschi Glas	Comedy	
Im Hause des Kommerzienrates	Herbert Ballmann	Gisela Schneeberger, Judy Winter, Karlheinz Böhm, Marianne Hoppe, Theo Lingen	Drama	
Im Zweifel gegen den Angeklagten? – Der Fall Dietrich Derz	Georg Althammer	Claus Theo Gärtner, Alf Marholm	Crime, Docudrama	a.k.a. Im Zweifel für den Angeklagten – Der Fall Dietrich Derz
In the Best of Families	Franz Peter Wirth	Wolfgang Kieling	Comedy	a.k.a. Baby Hamilton oder Das kommt in den besten Familien vor
Innocents with Dirty Hands	Claude Chabrol	Rod Steiger, Romy Schneider, Jean Rochefort, Hans Christian Blech	Thriller	French-Italian-West German co-production
Inside Out	Peter Duffell	Telly Savalas, Robert Culp, James Mason, Aldo Ray, Doris Kunstmann	Thriller	British-American-West German co-production
Jedermanns Weihnachtsbaum	Theodor Grädler	Horst Bollmann, Uschi Glas, Lina Carstens, Rudolf Schündler	Comedy	
John Glückstadt	Ulf Miehe	Dieter Laser, Marie-Christine Barrault	Crime drama	Entered into the 25th Berlin International Film Festival
Kampf um ein Kind	Ingemo Engström	Lisa Kreuzer	Drama	
Katinka	Peter Beauvais	Sabine Sinjen, Klausjürgen Wussow	Drama	a.k.a. Am Wege a.k.a. Ved Vejen
Keine Spürhunde für den Fiskus	Thomas Fantl	Herbert Fleischmann, Antje Hagen, Liane Hielscher, Klaus Höhne, Ferdy Mayne	Drama	
Kennwort: Fasanenjagd München 1945	Karlheinz Bieber	Karl Michael Vogler, Werner Kreindl, Gustl Bayrhammer, Eva Maria Meineke, Hans Paetsch, Richard Lauffen	War, Docudrama	a.k.a. Hunt for the Golden Pheasants
Das Kind	Heinz Schirk	Maud Ackermann, Anfried Krämer	Thriller	a.k.a. Hush, It's a Game
Kleine Bank mit schlechten Noten	Eberhard Pieper	Walter Kohut, Roger Fritz, Werner Kreindl, Karl-Heinz von Hassel, Angelika Bender	Crime	
Knife in the Back	Ottokar Runze	Hans Brenner, Hellmut Lange, Barbara Valentin, Karl-Heinz Vosgerau, Gert Haucke, Günter Lamprecht	Crime	
Die kurze lehrreiche Geschichte der Helga N.	Rolf Busch	Hilde Lermann	Drama	
LH 615 – Operation München	Theo Mezger	Karl-Heinz von Hassel, Gert Günther Hoffmann, Michael Hinz	Docudrama	
The Last Holidays	Rainer Erler	Jutta Speidel, Dieter Laser, Udo Vioff	Thriller	a.k.a. The Last Vacation
The Last Word	Robert van Ackeren	Delphine Seyrig, Barry Foster, Peter Hall, Udo Kier	Drama	
Lehmanns Erzählungen	Wolfgang Staudte	Otto Sander, Anton Diffring	Comedy	
Lehmanns letzter Lenz	Eberhard Pieper	Horst Bollmann, Peter Schiff	Drama	
Lenau	Roland Gall	Tilo Prückner	Drama	
Eine Liebe	Hans Rolf Strobel, Heinrich Tichawsky		Docudrama	
Lina Braake	Bernhard Sinkel	Lina Carstens, Fritz Rasp, Herbert Bötticher	Crime comedy	a.k.a. Lina Braake oder Die Interessen der Bank können nicht die Interessen sein, die Lina Braake hat. German Film Award for Best Feature Film 1975
Literature	Wolfgang Glück	Helmuth Lohner, Christine Ostermayer, Otto Schenk	Comedy	Austrian-West German co-production
Little Boy	Eberhard Itzenplitz	Herbert Stass, Siegfried Wischnewski, Elfriede Irrall	War	
The Lost Honour of Katharina Blum	Volker Schlöndorff, Margarethe von Trotta	Angela Winkler, Mario Adorf, Dieter Laser, Jürgen Prochnow, Heinz Bennent, Hannelore Hoger	Drama, Thriller	
The Maddest Car in the World	Rudolf Zehetgruber	Rudolf Zehetgruber, Sal Borgese, Walter Giller	Comedy	
Memento Mori	Ludwig Cremer	Lil Dagover, Paul Hoffmann, Wolfgang Büttner, Johanna Hofer, Edith Heerdegen, Ernst Fritz Fürbringer, Paul Edwin Roth	Thriller	
Metamorphosis	Jan Němec	Heinz Bennent, Zdenka Procházková, Achim Strietzel	Drama	
Michael oder Die Schwierigkeiten mit dem Glück	Erika Runge	Patrick Kreuzer, Ingrid Zener, Ernst Spaeth	Drama	
Millions of Years Ahead of Man	Manfred Baier		Documentary	
Monika and the Sixteen Year Olds	Charly Steinberger	Maria Zürer, Oliver Collignon, Liselotte Pulver, Klausjürgen Wussow, Teri Tordai	Comedy	a.k.a. Sweet Sixteen
Moses und Aron	Straub–Huillet	Günter Reich	Opera	West German-Austrian-French-Italian co-production
Mother Küsters' Trip to Heaven	Rainer Werner Fassbinder	Brigitte Mira, Ingrid Caven, Karlheinz Böhm, Margit Carstensen	Drama	a.k.a. Mother Küsters Goes to Heaven
Münchnerinnen	Eberhard Itzenplitz	Hilde Lermann, Erich Hallhuber	Drama	
My Sister and I	Fred Kraus	Heidi Brühl, Bela Ernyey, Willy Millowitsch, Peter Kraus, Ralf Wolter	Musical comedy	
Nach der Scheidung	Peter Beauvais	Marlies Engel	Drama	
Nachtdienst	Krzysztof Zanussi, Edward Żebrowski	Elisabeth Bergner, Jadwiga Jankowska-Cieślak	Drama	
The Net	Manfred Purzer	Mel Ferrer, Elke Sommer, Klaus Kinski, Heinz Bennent, Susanne Uhlen, Andrea Rau	Thriller	a.k.a. The Poisoned Stream
Das ohnmächtige Pferd	Rolf von Sydow	Paul Hubschmid, Eva Renzi, Christian Wolff, Jan Niklas	Comedy	a.k.a. Le Cheval évanoui
Olaf und Albert	Karl Fruchtmann	Hannes Messemer, Karl-Georg Saebisch	Drama	
Parapsycho – Spectrum of Fear	Peter Patzak	Mathieu Carrière, Mascha Gonska, Marisa Mell, William Berger, Leon Askin	Horror, Anthology	West German-Austrian co-production
Polly oder Die Bataille am Bluewater Creek	Jürgen Flimm	Cornelia Froboess, Vera Tschechowa, Vadim Glowna, Heinz Baumann, Romuald Pekny	Musical	
Poor Richard	Lutz Büscher	Wolf Roth, Anita Lochner, Martin Lüttge, Kai Fischer	Comedy	
Der Prototyp	Sven Severin	Matthias Habich	Drama	
Des Pudels Kern	Vojtěch Jasný	Helmut Qualtinger	Drama	West German-Austrian co-production
Die Rakete	Dieter Wedel	Joachim Bißmeier, Gerhard Olschewski, Hans Helmut Dickow, Evelyn Opela	Spy, Comedy	a.k.a. The Missile
Revolt in the Reformatory	Hans Quest	Günter Strack, Hans Caninenberg, Christian Kohlund, Hans-Georg Panczak	Drama	
Rheinpromenade	Heinz Schirk	Rudolf Platte, Ulrike Bliefert	Drama	
Salome	Götz Friedrich	Teresa Stratas	Opera	
Die Schießübung	Norbert Kückelmann	Walter Sedlmayr	Black comedy	
Schließfach 763	Wolfgang Staudte	Horst Frank, Judy Winter, Harry Meyen, Walter Kohut, Walter Jokisch	Crime	
Ein schönes Paar	Franz Peter Wirth	Harald Leipnitz, Gila von Weitershausen	Thriller	a.k.a. Double Cross a.k.a. The Gentle Trap a.k.a. Husband, Dear Husband
Schoolmaster Hofer	Peter Lilienthal	André Watt	Drama	a.k.a. Headmaster Hofer a.k.a. Hauptlehrer Hofer
A Second Spring	Ulli Lommel	Curd Jürgens, Irmgard Schönberg, Eddie Constantine	Drama	
The Secret Carrier	Franz Josef Gottlieb	Willy Millowitsch, Sybil Danning, Gunther Philipp, Brigitte Mira, Theo Lingen	Comedy	
The Shadow Out of Time	George Moorse	Anton Diffring	Science fiction	a.k.a. Schatten aus der Zeit
Special Section	Costa-Gavras	Michael Lonsdale, Heinz Bennent, Bruno Cremer, Michel Galabru, Hans Richter	War, Drama	French-West German-Italian co-production
Die Stadt im Tal	Wolfgang Petersen	Paul Dahlke, Siegfried Wischnewski, Susanne Uhlen, Hans Peter Korff, Dieter Kirchlechner, Karl Walter Diess	Drama	
Stellenweise Glatteis	Wolfgang Petersen	Günter Lamprecht, Karl-Heinz von Hassel, Léonie Thelen, Klaus Schwarzkopf, Claus Theo Gärtner	Drama	
Streng geheim	Thomas Engel	Hans Jürgen Diedrich, Karin Anselm, Ivan Desny, Hans Richter	Crime comedy	Remake of A Mission for Mr. Dodd (1964)
Stumme Zeugen	Peter Beauvais	Renate Küster, Witta Pohl	Crime	
Tadellöser & Wolff	Eberhard Fechner	Karl Lieffen, Edda Seippel, Michael Poliza, Martin Semmelrogge	Drama, War	a.k.a. Tadellöser und Wolff
That Most Important Thing: Love	Andrzej Żuławski	Romy Schneider, Klaus Kinski, Fabio Testi, Jacques Dutronc	Drama	French-Italian-West German co-production
To the Bitter End	Gerd Oswald	Maurice Ronet, Suzy Kendall, Christine Wodetzky, Susanne Uhlen, Rudolf Fernau, Ferdy Mayne	Drama	West German-Austrian co-production
Der Tod vor dem Sterben	Rainer Wolffhardt	Herbert Stass, Maria Körber, Dieter Kirchlechner, Jürgen Thormann, Manfred Günther, Peter Schiff	Drama	
Der tödliche Schlag	Franz Josef Wild	Siegfried Wischnewski, Hannes Messemer	Drama	
Tristan	Herbert Ballmann	Gerd Baltus, Herlinde Latzko, Günter Strack, Theo Lingen	Drama	
Trotzki in Coyoacan	Rolf Busch	René Deltgen, Edith Heerdegen	Biography	a.k.a. Trotsky in Coyoacán
Two for the Seesaw	Ludwig Cremer	Horst Frank, Donata Höffer	Drama	a.k.a. Spiel zu zweit
Under the Pavement Lies the Strand	Helma Sanders-Brahms	Grischa Huber, Heinrich Giskes	Drama	
The Unguarded House	Rainer Wolffhardt	Karin Baal, Günter Lamprecht, Lina Carstens, Renate Schroeter, Traugott Buhre, Werner Kreindl	Drama	a.k.a. Tomorrow and Yesterday a.k.a. Haus ohne Hüter
Unter Denkmalschutz	Eberhard Fechner		Documentary	
Valley of the Dancing Widows	Volker Vogeler	Judy Stephen, Montserrat Julió, Lone Fleming, Jeannine Mestre, Ágata Lys, Léonie Thelen, Tilo Prückner, Harry Baer, Eduardo Fajardo, Hugo Blanco Galiasso, George Rigaud, Daniel Martín, Cris Huerta, Luis Induni	Western	West German-Spanish co-production
Victoria and Her Hussar	Eugen York	Tamara Lund, Werner Krenn, Bruce Low, Julia Migenes	Musical	
Le vieux fusil	Robert Enrico	Philippe Noiret, Romy Schneider, Joachim Hansen, Robert Hoffmann, Karl Michael Vogler	War	French-West German co-production
Wanted: Babysitter	René Clément	Maria Schneider, Sydne Rome, Vic Morrow, Robert Vaughn, Nadja Tiller, Carl Möhner, Georg Marischka	Thriller	French-Italian-West German co-production
Weak Spot	Peter Fleischmann	Michel Piccoli, Ugo Tognazzi, Mario Adorf	Drama	French-Italian-West German co-production
Die weiße Stadt	Michael Kehlmann	Peter Weck, Sonja Sutter	Drama	Austrian-West German co-production
Weitere Aussichten	Franz Xaver Kroetz	Therese Giehse	Drama	
Wie starb Dag Hammarskjöld?	Oswald Döpke	Cordula Trantow, Robert Owens, Alexander Kerst, Horst Naumann, Peter Mosbacher	Docudrama	
Winterreise	Ilse Hofmann	Sabine von Maydell	Drama	
Der Wohltäter	Wolf Dietrich	Gustl Bayrhammer, Carolin Ohrner, Andrea L'Arronge	Drama	
The Wrong Move	Wim Wenders	Rüdiger Vogler, Hanna Schygulla, Peter Kern, Ivan Desny, Hans Christian Blech, Nastassja Kinski, Marianne Hoppe, Lisa Kreuzer	Drama	
Zahnschmerzen	Michael Kehlmann	Manfred Seipold, Franziska Oehme, Eckart Dux, Gernot Endemann, Alexander Kerst	Alternate history	
Zar und Zimmermann	Axel Corti	Hermann Prey, Karl Ridderbusch, Lucia Popp, Adalbert Kraus, Alexander Malta	Opera	
Zwangspause	Konrad Sabrautzky	Angelika Bender	Drama	
Zwei Finger einer Hand	Georg Marischka	Ferdy Mayne, George Pravda, Carl Duering, Victor Beaumont, Gordon Sterne, Milo Sperber	Crime	

== 1976 ==
Title	Director	Cast	Genre	Notes
2 geile Hirsche auf der Flucht	Alois Brummer	Sepp Gneißl	Adult	
1900	Bernardo Bertolucci	Robert De Niro, Gérard Depardieu, Burt Lancaster, Dominique Sanda, Stefania Sandrelli, Donald Sutherland, Sterling Hayden, Anna Henkel, Ellen Schwiers, Werner Bruhns	Romantic drama, War	Italian-American-French-West German co-production. 1 win & 1 nom.
Die Affäre Lerouge	Wilhelm Semmelroth	René Deltgen, Günter Strack, Peter Pasetti, Volkert Kraeft, Herlinde Latzko	Mystery	a.k.a. The Widow Lerouge a.k.a. The Lerouge Case
Anita Drögemöller und die Ruhe an der Ruhr	Alfred Vohrer	Monique van de Ven, Harald Leipnitz, Helga Anders, Reiner Schöne, Brigitte Mira	Drama	
Anschi und Michael	Rüdiger Nüchtern	Gaby Rubner, Michael Bentele	Drama	
Die Ansiedlung	Otto Jägersberg	Mathias Eysen, Dietmar Schönherr, Barbara Lass, Gerd Baltus, Gert Haucke	Drama	
As of Tomorrow	Franz Antel	Arthur Kennedy, Carroll Baker, Curd Jürgens, Vittorio Caprioli, Angelo Infanti, Werner Pochath	Crime comedy	a.k.a. Blackmail Chase. West German-Austrian-Italian co-production
The Atlantic Swimmers	Herbert Achternbusch	Heinz Braun, Herbert Achternbusch	Drama	
Attempted Flight	Vojtěch Jasný	Tomislav Savić, Hansjörg Felmy, Ilija Ivezić, Hermina Pipinić, Klaus Löwitsch	Drama	
Auf ewig Dein	Werner Schlechte	Angelika Bender, Ralf Schermuly	Thriller	a.k.a. Who's Been Sleeping in My Bed?
Der aufregende Fall des Studienrats Adam Juracek	Tom Toelle	Siegfried W. Kernen, Klaus Löwitsch, Angelika Bender, Günter Mack, Walter Rilla, Alexander May	Science fiction, Comedy	a.k.a. White Book: Adam Juráček Vs. Sir Isaac Newton
Aus nichtigem Anlaß	Eberhard Fechner	Helmuth Lohner, Susanne Beck	Crime	a.k.a. Aus nichtigem Anlass
Die Babenberger in Österreich	Fritz Umgelter	Klaus Maria Brandauer, Hannelore Elsner	History, Docudrama	Austrian-West German co-production
Ein Badeunfall	Fritz Umgelter	Christian Quadflieg, Christine Merthan	Thriller	Austrian-West German co-production
Bait	Peter Patzak	Yves Beneyton, Carroll Baker, Raymond Pellegrin, Mathieu Carrière, Karl Michael Vogler, Hans Christian Blech	Crime	a.k.a. Shattered Dreams. West German-Austrian-French co-production
Baker's Bread	Erwin Keusch	Günter Lamprecht, Bernd Tauber, Silvia Reize	Drama	
Barbara	Hans-Werner Schmidt	Lisa Kreuzer	Drama	
Bei Westwind hört man keinen Schuß	Sepp Strubel	Wolfgang Kieling, Siegfried Wischnewski	Crime	a.k.a. Bei Westwind hört man keinen Schuss
The Belkin Tales	Uli Edel, Klaus Emmerich, Hajo Gies	Siegfried Wischnewski, Gisela Trowe, Herlinde Latzko, Peter Chatel, Bernd Herberger, Peter Lühr	Anthology	a.k.a. Die Erzählungen Bjelkins
Bomber & Paganini	Nikos Perakis	Mario Adorf, Tilo Prückner, Barbara Valentin, Margot Werner	Comedy	a.k.a. Bomber and Paganini a.k.a. Bomber und Paganini
Born for Hell	Denis Héroux	Mathieu Carrière, Christine Boisson, Eva Mattes, Carole Laure	Horror	a.k.a. Naked Massacre. Canadian-French-West German-Italian co-production
Candida	Werner Schlechte	Cordula Trantow, Wolfgang Reichmann	Drama	
Carnival Confession	Eberhard Itzenplitz	Hannes Messemer, Klaus Hoffmann, Despina Pajanou	Drama	
Chain of Darkness	Karl Fruchtmann	Vadim Glowna, Rolf Becker, Wolfgang Kieling, Gert Haucke	Crime	a.k.a. Ketten
Chinese Roulette	Rainer Werner Fassbinder	Margit Carstensen, Anna Karina, Ulli Lommel, Macha Méril, Alexander Allerson, Brigitte Mira, Volker Spengler, Andrea Schober	Drama	West German-French co-production
The Clown	Vojtěch Jasný	Helmut Griem, Hanna Schygulla, Hans Christian Blech	Drama	
Comedian Harmonists	Eberhard Fechner		Documentary, Music	
The Country of the Blind	Pete Ariel	Fred Stillkrauth, Rainer Langhans, Jutta Winkelmann	Fantasy	a.k.a. Das Land der Blinden oder Von einem der auszog
Coup de Grâce	Volker Schlöndorff	Margarethe von Trotta, Matthias Habich, Mathieu Carrière	War, Drama	West German-French co-production. Set in the Russian Civil War
Darf ich mitspielen?	Walter Davy	Klaus Maria Brandauer, Gertraud Jesserer, Otto Schenk	Comedy	a.k.a. Will You Play with Me? Austrian-West German co-production
Dear Fatherland Be at Peace	Roland Klick	Heinz Domez, Catherine Allégret, Günter Pfitzmann, Rolf Zacher, Margot Werner, Georg Marischka	Thriller	a.k.a. The Berlin Connection a.k.a. Double Agent – Triple Cross
Death Rite	Claude Chabrol	Gert Fröbe, Franco Nero, Stefania Sandrelli, Jean Rochefort, Gila von Weitershausen	Thriller	French-West German-Italian co-production
The Desert of the Tartars	Valerio Zurlini	Max von Sydow, Fernando Rey, Helmut Griem, Vittorio Gassman, Jean-Louis Trintignant, Giuliano Gemma, Philippe Noiret, Francisco Rabal	War	Italian-French-West German co-production
Dorothea Merz	Peter Beauvais	Sabine Sinjen, Dieter Wernecke, Fritz Rasp, Dieter Kirchlechner, Elisabeth Trissenaar	Drama	
Einöd	Günter Gräwert	Horst Frank, Wilfried Klaus, Wega Jahnke	Thriller	a.k.a. Ein bißchen Föhn, und du bist tot
The Elixirs of the Devil	Manfred Purzer	Dieter Laser, Horst Frank, Peter Brogle, Sylvia Manas, Christine Buchegger, Heinrich Schweiger, Rudolf Fernau	Drama	a.k.a. The Devil's Elixirs
Emigranten	Franz Peter Wirth	Ernst Jacobi, Peter Kuiper	Drama	
Enemies	Frank Guthke	Rolf Henniger, Margot Trooger, Pinkas Braun, Helmut Käutner, Werner Kreindl, Gert Haucke, Gerhard Olschewski	Drama	a.k.a. Feinde
Erika	Falk Harnack	Silvia Reize	Drama	
Erika's Passions	Ula Stöckl	Vera Tschechowa, Karin Baal	Drama	
Erinnerung an die Leidenschaft	Martin Hennig	Jürgen Prochnow, Udo Kier, Lisa Kreuzer, Rudolf Schündler	Drama	a.k.a. Erinnerungen an die Leidenschaft
Everyone Dies Alone	Alfred Vohrer	Hildegard Knef, Carl Raddatz	Drama, War	a.k.a. Every Man Dies Alone
Der Fall Bundhund	Eberhard Hauff	Jörg Hube	Drama	
Fallmerayer the Stationmaster	Walter Davy	Odile Versois, Wolfgang Hübsch	Drama	a.k.a. Stationschef Fallmerayer. Austrian-West German co-production
Fehlschuss	Rainer Boldt	Wolfgang Ambros, Franz Buchrieser, Pola Kinski	Drama	a.k.a. Missed Goal. Austrian-West German co-production
Feuerwerk	Franz Josef Wild	Erika Pluhar, Cornelia Köndgen, Harald Serafin, Susi Nicoletti, Erik Frey, Marianne Mendt	Musical comedy	a.k.a. Fireworks. Austrian-West German co-production
Frauensiedlung	Wolfgang Storch	Monica Bleibtreu, Jürgen Prochnow	Drama	a.k.a. A Woman's Estate
Fünf Prüfungen des Oberbürgermeisters	Claus Peter Witt	Hannes Messemer	Biography, History	a.k.a. Konrad Adenauer – Studie in Szenen
Games	Sigi Rothemund	Uwe Friedrichsen, Cordula Trantow, Hans Caninenberg, Pinkas Braun, Silvia Reize, Wolfgang Wahl	Black comedy	a.k.a. Gesellschaftsspiele
Goldflocken	Werner Schroeter	Andréa Ferréol, Bulle Ogier, Udo Kier, Magdalena Montezuma, Ingrid Caven, Christine Kaufmann	Experimental	West German-French co-production
Golden Night	Serge Moati	Klaus Kinski, Elisabeth Flickenschildt, Bernard Blier, Maurice Ronet, Charles Vanel, Anny Duperey	Thriller	French-West German co-production
The Gypsy Baron	Arthur Maria Rabenalt	Ellen Shade, Siegfried Jerusalem, Ivan Rebroff, Janet Perry	Musical	
Hans im Glück	Wolfgang Petersen	Jürgen Prochnow, Ingmar Zeisberg	Drama	
Hans und Heinz Kirch	Günter Gräwert	Martin Lüttge, Gottfried Kramer	Drama	
Heart of Glass	Werner Herzog	Josef Bierbichler	Drama	
Die Heiratsvermittlerin	Hellmuth Matiasek	Maria Schell, Fritz Tillmann, Peter Striebeck, Jacques Breuer	Comedy	a.k.a. The Matchmaker
Der Herr der Schöpfung	Korbinian Köberle	Uta Hallant, Michael Degen, Peter Arens, Wolfgang Condrus	Anthology	
Ein herrlicher Tag	Diethard Klante	Violetta Ferrari, Witta Pohl, Fritz Lichtenhahn	Comedy	
Himmel und Erde	Karl Fruchtmann	Christa Berndl	Drama	
Der Hofmeister	Harry Buckwitz	Ernst Jacobi, Anita Lochner, Hans Helmut Dickow	Drama	a.k.a. The Tutor
How Much Wood Would a Woodchuck Chuck	Werner Herzog		Documentary	
The Hypochondriac	Wilm ten Haaf	Wolfgang Kieling, Violetta Ferrari, Claudia Wedekind, Werner Kreindl	Comedy	a.k.a. The Imaginary Invalid
I Only Want You to Love Me	Rainer Werner Fassbinder	Vitus Zeplichal, Alexander Allerson, Elke Aberle	Drama	
Idole	Klaus Lemke	Cleo Kretschmer	Comedy	
Die Illusion der Möglichkeit	Claudia Holldack	Tilly Lauenstein, Käthe Haack	Drama	
Die Ilse ist weg	Ilse Hofmann	Susanne Werner, Marion Heister, Lina Carstens, Günter Lamprecht	Drama	
Insel der Rosen	Franz Peter Wirth	Günter Lamprecht, Sigfrit Steiner, Christine Wodetzky	Drama	
Intermezzo für fünf Hände	Ludwig Cremer	Klaus Schwarzkopf, Hanna Schygulla, Susanne Uhlen, Cordula Trantow, Ruth Maria Kubitschek, Ellen Schwiers	Comedy	
Jack the Ripper	Jesús Franco	Klaus Kinski, Josephine Chaplin, Herbert Fux	Horror	West German-Swiss co-production
Jakob der Letzte	Axel Corti	Bruno Dallansky	Drama	Austrian-West German co-production
Le Jeune Homme et le Lion	Jean Delannoy	Mathieu Carrière, Georges Wilson, Doris Kunstmann, Raimund Harmstorf	Drama	a.k.a. Könige sterben einsam. French-West German co-production
Julia und Romeo	Franz Peter Wirth	Harald Leipnitz, Xenia Pörtner, Rudolf Fernau, Udo Vioff, Petra Schürmann, Peter Sattmann, Franziska Walser	Comedy	a.k.a. Juliet and Romeo a.k.a. Romeo und Julia
Kann ich noch ein bisschen bleiben?	Imo Moszkowicz	Ellen Schwiers, Alexander Kerst, Gila von Weitershausen, Klaus Wildbolz, Alexander May	Comedy	
Kein Abend wie jeder andere	Hermann Leitner	Heinz Rühmann, Peter Ustinov	Comedy	
Keine Angst vor Thomas B.	Carlheinz Caspari	Hans Häckermann, Rosemarie Gerstenberg	Drama	
Kings of the Road	Wim Wenders	Rüdiger Vogler, Hanns Zischler, Lisa Kreuzer, Rudolf Schündler	Drama, Road movie	Won the FIPRESCI Prize at the 1976 Cannes Film Festival
Das kleine Hofkonzert	Wolfgang Liebeneiner	Naëmi Priegel, Amadeus August, Gustav Knuth, Peter Lühr, Friedrich Schütter, Hans Helmut Dickow, Georg Lehn	Musical	a.k.a. The Court Concert
Eine kleine Liebe	Hans-Peter Meier	Martin Semmelrogge, Maria Machado	Drama	
Ein Klotz am Bein	Stanislav Barabáš	Loni von Friedl, Walter Kohut, Hans Korte, Joachim Ansorge, Sabine von Maydell, Eva Maria Meineke	Comedy	a.k.a. Un fil à la patte
Krawatten für Olympia	Hartmann Schmige, Stefan Lukschy	Ulrich Gressieker, Eric Vaessen, Inge Sievers, Evelyn Meyka, Hansi Jochmann	Comedy	
Lebensdaten	Eberhard Fechner		Documentary	
Liebe mit 50	Günter Gräwert	Peter Schiff, Louise Martini, Renate Grosser, Cornelia Froboess, Lina Carstens	Drama	
Little County Court	Wolf Dietrich	Otto Tausig	Comedy	a.k.a. Kleines Bezirksgericht
A Lost Life	Ottokar Runze	Gerhard Olschewski, Gert Haucke, Marius Müller-Westernhagen	Crime drama	Olschewski won the Silver Bear for Best Actor at Berlin
Mademoiselle de Scuderi	Lutz Büscher	Angela Salloker, Hannes Messemer, Iris Berben, Richard Lauffen	Mystery	
Männergeschichten – Frauengeschichten	Peter Beauvais	Helmut Griem, Renate Küster, Marlies Engel, Matthias Fuchs, Susanne Uhlen, Max Volkert Martens, Barbara Freier, Martin Lüttge, Witta Pohl, Ingmar Zeisberg	Drama	
Margarete in Aix	Helmut Käutner	Erika Pluhar	Comedy	
Maria Morzeck	Horst Flick	Nora von Collande, Charles Brauer	Drama	Remake of The Rabbit Is Me (1965)
The Marquise of O	Éric Rohmer	Edith Clever, Bruno Ganz	Drama	French-West German co-production
The Marriage of Figaro	Jean-Pierre Ponnelle	Hermann Prey, Mirella Freni, Dietrich Fischer-Dieskau, Kiri Te Kanawa, Maria Ewing	Opera	
The Mimosa Wants to Blossom Too	Helmut Meewes	Curd Jürgens, Eric Pohlmann, Horst Frank	Spy comedy	
Minna von Barnhelm	Franz Peter Wirth	Reinhild Solf, Frank Hoffmann, Wega Jahnke, Werner Kreindl, Klaus Schwarzkopf, Helmuth Lohner	Comedy	
MitGift	Michael Verhoeven	Senta Berger, Mario Adorf, Ron Ely, Helmut Qualtinger, Elisabeth Flickenschildt	Black comedy	
Mozart: A Childhood Chronicle	Klaus Kirschner	Santiago Ziesmer, Karl-Maria Schley	Biography, Music	a.k.a. Mozart: Recordings of a Youth
Der Nerz	Frank Guthke	Louise Martini, Hans Quest, Jörg Pleva, Peter Schiff, Erik Schumann, Marion Martienzen	Comedy	a.k.a. The Good Soup
The New Sorrows of Young W.	Eberhard Itzenplitz	Klaus Hoffmann	Drama	a.k.a. The New Sufferings of Young W.
No One Will Play with Me	Werner Herzog		Short	
North Sea Is Dead Sea	Hark Bohm	Uwe Bohm, Dschingis Bowakow, Marquard Bohm	Drama	a.k.a. Nordsee ist Mordsee
Nur bitte nicht heut' nacht	Gig Malzacher	Claudia Wedekind, Udo Vioff, Paul Dahlke, Jan Niklas	Comedy	
Old Acquaintance	Arno Assmann	Ruth Leuwerik, Rosemarie Fendel	Drama	a.k.a. Meine beste Freundin
Opa Schulz	Erika Runge	Erhard Dhein	Drama	
Der Opportunist	Karl Fruchtmann	Arno Assmann, Gisela Trowe, Volkert Kraeft, Walter Kohut, Ulrich Matschoss	War, Biography	a.k.a. Der Opportunist oder Vom Umgang mit Besatzern – Der Fall Pierre Laval
A Part of Myself	August Everding	Herbert Mensching, Christine Ostermayer, Peter Fricke, Will Quadflieg, Karl Paryla, Klaus Schwarzkopf, Richard Münch, Günter Strack	Biography	a.k.a. Als wär's ein Stück von mir
Paule Pauländer	Reinhard Hauff	Manfred Reiss, Manfred Gnoth	Drama	
Potato Fritz	Peter Schamoni	Hardy Krüger, Stephen Boyd, Arthur Brauss, Diana Körner, Paul Breitner	Western	a.k.a. Montana Trap
Proud Destiny	Heinz Schirk	Hans-Michael Rehberg, Arno Assmann, Walter Rilla, Rolf Becker, Mogens von Gadow, Christine Böhm, Sky du Mont	History	a.k.a. Waffen für Amerika a.k.a. Die Füchse im Weinberg
Prozeß Medusa	Wolfgang Staudte	Siegfried Wischnewski, Ferdy Mayne, Arthur Brauss	History, Disaster	a.k.a. Prozess Medusa
Regina	Gedeon Kovács	Kornelia Boje, Manfred Seipold, Werner Hinz	Drama	
Rosemary's Daughter	Rolf Thiele	Lillian Müller, Horst Frank, Bela Ernyey, Werner Pochath, Hanne Wieder, Herbert Fux	Exploitation	
Rosaura at Ten O'Clock	Günter Gräwert	Herlinde Latzko, Lutz Mackensy, Anaid Iplicjian, Cornelia Meinhardt, Marius Müller-Westernhagen	Mystery	a.k.a. Rosaura at 10 O'Clock
Salon Kitty	Tinto Brass	Helmut Berger, Ingrid Thulin	Exploitation, War	Italian-West German-French co-production
Satan's Brew	Rainer Werner Fassbinder	Kurt Raab, Margit Carstensen, Helen Vita, Volker Spengler, Ingrid Caven, Brigitte Mira, Y Sa Lo, Christiane Maybach, Kitty Buchhammer	Drama	
Eine schlimme oder eine gute Zeit	Konrad Sabrautzky	Barbara Rütting, Edwin Noël	Drama	a.k.a. Eine schlimme Zeit oder eine gute Zeit
Der schwarze Storch	Herbert Ballmann	Friederike Schneider, Małgorzata Potocka, Hartmut Reck, Dinah Hinz, Henryk Bista, Rudolf Schündler	Drama	
Seniorenschweiz	Otto Jägersberg	Karlheinz Böhm, Johanna Hofer, Wolfgang Büttner, Alexander May	Science fiction	
Sensational Janine	Hans Billian	Patricia Rhomberg	Adult	
Shadow of Angels	Daniel Schmid	Klaus Löwitsch, Ingrid Caven, Rainer Werner Fassbinder, Boy Gobert, Ulli Lommel	Drama	Swiss-West German co-production
Shirin's Wedding	Helma Sanders-Brahms	Ayten Erten, Jürgen Prochnow, Aliki Georgouli, Aras Ören	Drama	
Silence in the Forest	Alfred Vohrer	Belinda Mayne, Alexander Stephan, Evelyn Opela, Ferdy Mayne	Drama	
Sladek	Oswald Döpke	Marius Müller-Westernhagen, Vadim Glowna, Klaus Schwarzkopf, Günter Pfitzmann, Louise Martini	Drama	a.k.a. Sladek oder Die schwarze Armee
So oder so ist das Leben	Veit Relin	Margot Werner, Maria Schell, Reinhard Kolldehoff, Christine Schuberth	Drama	
The Sold Grandfather	Theodor Grädler	Ludwig Schmid-Wildy, Walter Sedlmayr	Comedy	
Sperrmüll	Michael Haneke	Ernst Fritz Fürbringer, Tilli Breidenbach	Drama	
The Sternstein Manor	Hans W. Geißendörfer	Katja Rupé, Tilo Prückner, Peter Kern, Gustl Bayrhammer, Agnes Fink	Drama	Entered into the 10th Moscow International Film Festival
Strongman Ferdinand	Alexander Kluge	Heinz Schubert, Vérénice Rudolph, Gert Günther Hoffmann, Siegfried Wischnewski	Comedy	
Die Story	Dieter Lemmel	Cornelia Froboess, Hans Peter Korff	Drama	
Summerfolk	Peter Stein	Edith Clever, Bruno Ganz, Jutta Lampe, Otto Sander, Michael König	Drama	a.k.a. Summer Guests
The Swiss Conspiracy	Jack Arnold	David Janssen, Senta Berger, Elke Sommer, John Ireland, John Saxon, Ray Milland, Anton Diffring	Thriller	American-West German-Swiss co-production
Die Tannerhütte	Marianne Lüdcke, Ingo Kratisch	Christoph Felsenstein, Grischa Huber, Paul Dahlke, Karlheinz Böhm, Hans-Georg Panczak, Willy Semmelrogge	Drama	
Die Taube in der Hand	Frank Guthke	Harald Juhnke, Brigitte Grothum, Anita Kupsch	Comedy	
Taxi 4012	Theodor Grädler	Harald Leipnitz, Werner Kreindl, Horst Janson, Thekla Carola Wied, Gerd Baltus, Karl-Otto Alberty	Crime	
A Thousand Clowns	Ludwig Cremer	Peer Schmidt	Comedy	
Three Bavarians in Bangkok	Sigi Rothemund	Franz Muxeneder, Willy Harlander, Marie Ekorre, Gina Janssen	Sex comedy	a.k.a. Bath-House Girls a.k.a. Bathtime in Bangkok
Three Paths to the Lake	Michael Haneke	Ursula Schult, Guido Wieland, Walter Schmidinger, Bernhard Wicki, Yves Beneyton	Drama	Austrian-West German co-production
Time of Maturity	Sohrab Shahid-Saless	Mike Henning, Eva Manhardt	Drama	a.k.a. Coming of Age a.k.a. Reifezeit
Timon of Athens	Oswald Döpke	Wolfgang Reichmann, Günter Strack, Siegfried Wischnewski	Drama	
Der Umsetzer	Benno Trautmann, Antonia Lerch	Klaus Jepsen, Charles Hans Vogt	Drama	a.k.a. The Evacuator
Vera Romeyke Is Not Acceptable	Max Willutzki	Rita Engelmann	Drama	
Verdunkelung	Peter Schulze-Rohr	Joachim Kemmer, Rolf Moebius, Rudolf Brand, Dagmar Biener, Erika Skrotzki, Klaus Jepsen, Karl-Josef Cramer	Crime, War	
Vier gegen die Bank	Wolfgang Petersen	Harald Leipnitz, Walter Kohut, Herbert Bötticher, Günther Neutze, Karin Eickelbaum, Ingrid van Bergen, Gitty Djamal, Christine Schuberth, Otto Sander, Karl-Heinz von Hassel, Uwe Dallmeier	Crime comedy	a.k.a. Four Against the Bank a.k.a. 4 Against the Bank a.k.a. 4 gegen die Bank
Die vollkommene Liebe	Heinz Schirk	Christine Ostermayer, Walther Reyer, Wolfgang Reichmann	Comedy	a.k.a. Un amour qui ne finit pas
Die Wahl	Rainer Boldt	Klaus Löwitsch	Drama	
Der wahre Jakob	Günter Gräwert	Willy Millowitsch, Angelika Milster, Ferdy Mayne, Eddi Arent, Xenia Pörtner	Comedy	
Walking Upright	Christian Ziewer	Claus Eberth, Antje Hagen	Drama	
Weder Tag noch Stunde	Bruno Jantoss	Günter Lamprecht, Monika Lundi, Sabine von Maydell, Günther Maria Halmer	Drama	
Wer einmal in die Mühle kommt	Ilo von Jankó	Werner Bruhns, Henning Gissel, Witta Pohl	Comedy	
Whispering Death	Jürgen Goslar	James Faulkner, Christopher Lee, Horst Frank, Sybil Danning, Trevor Howard	Action	a.k.a. Albino. West German-South African co-production
Die Wildente	Hans W. Geißendörfer	Jean Seberg, Bruno Ganz, Peter Kern, Anne Bennent, Heinz Bennent, Heinz Moog	Drama	a.k.a. The Wild Duck. West German-Austrian co-production
Willy and the Chinese Cat	Karin Thome	Anna Karina, Ulli Lommel, Giovanni Widmann	Family	a.k.a. Also es war so.... West German-Austrian co-production
The Winston Affair	Theo Mezger	Ralf Schermuly, Hannes Messemer, Hans Caninenberg, Herbert Fleischmann, Michael Hinz, Gunther Malzacher	Drama, War	
Wo liegt Arkadien?	Dieter Lemmel	Renate Schroeter, Hans Peter Korff, Judy Winter	Drama	
A Woman at Her Window	Pierre Granier-Deferre	Romy Schneider, Philippe Noiret, Victor Lanoux, Umberto Orsini, Joachim Hansen, Carl Möhner	Drama	French-West German-Italian co-production
Young Dr. Freud	Axel Corti	Karlheinz Hackl	Biography	Austrian-West German co-production

== 1977 ==
Title	Director	Cast	Genre	Notes
26. April 1977	Karl Fruchtmann	Wolfgang Büttner, Günter Mack, Marlies Engel, Peter Schiff, Erika Skrotzki	Science fiction	
Abelard	Franz Seitz	Anita Mally, Susanne Uhlen, Christian Kohlund, Christine Buchegger	Drama	
Achsensprung	Rolf von Sydow	Herbert Fleischmann, Rosemarie Fendel, Christof Wackernagel, Rudolf Schündler	Drama	
The American Friend	Wim Wenders	Bruno Ganz, Dennis Hopper, Lisa Kreuzer, Gérard Blain, Nicholas Ray, Samuel Fuller	Thriller	West German-French co-production. Entered into the 1977 Cannes Film Festival
Anpassung an eine zerstörte Illusion	Eberhard Itzenplitz	Claudia Rieschel, Christian Kohlund	Drama	
Arabella	Otto Schenk	Gundula Janowitz, Bernd Weikl, Sona Ghazarian, René Kollo	Opera	
Audienz	Frank Guthke	Hartmut Becker, Karl Friedrich	Comedy	a.k.a. Audience
Auf der Insel	Wolfram Zobus	Erika Skrotzki, Peter Schiff	Drama	a.k.a. On the Island
Die Aula	Horst Flick	Wolf Roth, Peter Seum	Drama	
Die Befragung des Machiavelli	Franz Josef Wild	Hannes Messemer, Siegfried Wischnewski	Drama	a.k.a. The Interrogation of Machiavelli
Belcanto	Robert van Ackeren	Kurt Raab, Udo Kier, Y Sa Lo, Romy Haag, Gabriele Lafari	Drama	a.k.a. Belcanto oder Darf eine Nutte schluchzen?
Bezauberndes Fräulein	Erich Neureuther	Béla Ernyey, Klaus Wildbolz, Barbara Schöne, Marlene Charell, Eric Pohlmann	Musical	
Born Yesterday	Ludwig Cremer	Elke Sommer, Heinz Baumann, Manfred Seipold, Walter Giller, Ralf Wolter	Comedy	a.k.a. Nicht von gestern
Britta	Berengar Pfahl	Verena Plangger	Drama	
The Brothers	Wolf Gremm	Klaus Löwitsch, Erika Pluhar, Doris Kunstmann	Drama	
The Burning Secret	Wilm ten Haaf	Christiane Hörbiger, Heinz Ehrenfreund, Thomas Ohrner, Walther Reyer	Drama	Austrian-West German co-production
Cécile	Dagmar Damek	Doris Kunstmann, Matthias Ponnier, Günther Ungeheuer	Drama	
The Chinese Miracle	Wolfgang Liebeneiner	Christian Kohlund, Heinz Rühmann, Senta Berger, Peter Pasetti, Harald Leipnitz	Drama	
The Confidential Clerk	Thomas Land	Alexander Kerst, Ernst Fritz Fürbringer, Knut Koch, Irmgard Först, Tilli Breidenbach	Comedy	a.k.a. Der Privatsekretär
The Conquest of the Citadel	Bernhard Wicki	András Fricsay, Ivan Desny, Armando Brancia, Vittoria Di Silverio, Dieter Kirchlechner	Drama	Entered into the 27th Berlin International Film Festival
Cross of Iron	Sam Peckinpah	James Coburn, Maximilian Schell, James Mason, David Warner, Senta Berger, Klaus Löwitsch, Vadim Glowna, Arthur Brauss, Burkhard Driest, Roger Fritz, Fred Stillkrauth, Dieter Schidor	War	a.k.a. Steiner – Das Eiserne Kreuz. West German-British co-production
Damen haben Vortritt	Maria Neocleous	Louise Martini, Liane Hielscher, Alexander Radszun, Ursela Monn	Comedy	
Death Is My Trade	Theodor Kotulla	Götz George, Hans Korte	War, Biography	
Death or Freedom	Wolf Gremm	Peter Sattmann, Gert Fröbe, Mario Adorf, Erika Pluhar, Harald Leipnitz	Adventure	
The Devil's Advocate	Guy Green	John Mills, Stéphane Audran, Jason Miller, Raf Vallone	Drama	Film production with money from West German private tax-shelter film funds ("Geria")
Diary of a Lover	Sohrab Shahid-Saless	Klaus Salge	Drama	
Disorder and Early Torment	Franz Seitz	Martin Held, Ruth Leuwerik, Sabine von Maydell, Christian Kohlund	Drama	a.k.a. Disorder and Early Sorrow
The Doctor's Dilemma	Rolf von Sydow	Karl Michael Vogler, Andrea Jonasson, Klaus Hoffmann, Paul Dahlke	Drama	
Eden End	Oswald Döpke	Sigfrit Steiner, Elfriede Irrall, Hans-Georg Panczak, Ulrike Bliefert	Drama	
Der Einstand	Reinhard Schwabenitzky	Christoph Waltz, Erwin Leder	Drama	West German-Austrian-Swiss co-production
Das Ende der Beherrschung	Gabi Kubach	Gila von Weitershausen, Pola Kinski, Manfred Zapatka	Drama	
Endstation Paradies	Thomas Engel	Inge Meysel, Maria Sebaldt, Erna Sellmer	Drama	
An Enemy of the People	Georg Marischka	Peter Ehrlich, Arno Assmann, Elisabeth Wiedemann, Christian Doermer	Drama	
Escape Route to Marseille	Ingemo Engström, Gerhard Theuring	Katharina Thalbach, Rüdiger Vogler	Docudrama, War	
The Expulsion from Paradise	Niklaus Schilling	Herb Andress, Elke Haltaufderheide, Jochen Busse, Andrea Rau	Drama	Entered into the 27th Berlin International Film Festival
Fairy	Vojtěch Jasný	Herlinde Latzko, Felix von Manteuffel, Louise Martini, Lina Carstens, Rudolf Schündler, Gert Haucke, Barbara Valentin	Fantasy	
Fathers and Sons	Claus Peter Witt	Dieter Laser, Christine Wodetzky, Karl Michael Vogler, Sigmar Solbach, Paul Edwin Roth	Drama	
Flucht	Thomas Fantl	Herbert Fleischmann, Hannelore Elsner	Crime thriller	
Die Freiheiten der Langeweile	Vojtěch Jasný	Lutz Reichert, Dieter Kaffka, Siegfried Reiter	Crime	
Fuhrmann Henschel	Werner Schlechte	Wolfgang Reichmann	Drama	a.k.a. Drayman Henschel
Ein ganz und gar verwahrlostes Mädchen	Jutta Brückner	Rita Rischak	Documentary	
The Fruit is Ripe	Sigi Rothemund	Betty Vergès	Sex comedy	
Gaslight	Ludwig Cremer	Erika Pluhar, Josef Meinrad, Gustav Knuth	Thriller	
Geistertrio	Samuel Beckett	Klaus Herm, Irmgard Först	Short	a.k.a. Ghost Trio
Generale – Anatomie der Marneschlacht	Franz Peter Wirth	Hannes Messemer, Karl Michael Vogler, Siegfried Wischnewski, Ferdy Mayne	War, Docudrama	
Die Geschichte der Susanna Margaretha Brandt	Hartmut Griesmayr	Erika Skrotzki	History, Crime	
Das Gesetz des Clans	Eugen York	Horst Frank, Gert Fröbe, Heidi Brühl, Hellmut Lange	Crime	
The Glass of Water	Wolfgang Glück	O. W. Fischer, Susanne Uhlen, Maria Becker, Oliver Tobias	Comedy	a.k.a. A Glass of Water
Glücksucher	Peter Beauvais	Martin Benrath, Judy Winter, Bernhard Wicki	Drama	
Grete Minde	Heidi Genée	Katerina Jacob, Siemen Rühaak, Hannelore Elsner, Tilo Prückner, Hans Christian Blech	Drama	West German-Austrian co-production. Entered into the 27th Berlin International Film Festival
Group Portrait with a Lady	Aleksandar Petrović	Romy Schneider, Brad Dourif, Michel Galabru, Vadim Glowna	Drama, War	West German-French co-production
Die Guten	Hans Dieter Schwarze	Udo Thomer, Grit Boettcher, Rainer Basedow	Comedy	a.k.a. Kind Men a.k.a. The Kind-Hearted Ones
Haben Sie nichts zu verzollen?	Michael Günther	Claus Biederstaedt, Simone Rethel, Alexander May, Edda Seippel	Comedy	a.k.a. Vous n'avez rien à déclarer?
Halbe-Halbe	Uwe Brandner	Hans Peter Hallwachs, Bernd Tauber, Agnes Dünneisen, Mascha Gonska, Ivan Desny, Kai Fischer	Comedy	a.k.a. 50/50
Der Haupttreffer	Thomas Fantl	Klaus Höhne, Maria Körber	Comedy	
Haus der Frauen	Krzysztof Zanussi	Lina Carstens, Brigitte Horney, Karin Baal, Cordula Trantow	Drama	
Der Heiligenschein	Heinz Schirk	Horst Frank, Brigitte Grothum	Comedy, Fantasy	a.k.a. Variation of a Theme
Heinrich	Helma Sanders-Brahms	Heinrich Giskes, Grischa Huber, Hannelore Hoger, Lina Carstens, Sigfrit Steiner, Heinz Hoenig	Biography	
Heinrich Zille	Rainer Wolffhardt	Martin Held, Stefan Wigger, Christoph Felsenstein, Horst Bollmann, Renate Küster, Rudolf Schündler, Otto Sander, Herbert Fleischmann, Harald Juhnke	Biography	
Hier kein Ausgang – nur Übergang	Rainer Wolffhardt	Ernst Jacobi, Regine Lamster	Drama	
Hitler: A Career	Joachim Fest, Christian Herrendoerfer		War, Documentary	a.k.a. Hitler: The Whole Story
Hitler: A Film from Germany	Hans-Jürgen Syberberg	Peter Kern, Heinz Schubert, Hellmut Lange, André Heller	War, Experimental	West German-French-British co-production
Das höfliche Alptraumkrokodil	Frank Strecker	Jörg Pleva, Günter Mack, Volker Lechtenbrink, Heinz Meier, Wolfgang Wahl	Family	
The Hot Tiara	Imo Moszkowicz	Gerlinde Locker, Klaus Wildbolz, Ferdy Mayne, Walter Giller	Crime comedy	a.k.a. Heiße Ware
Im Nest	Michael Lähn	Judy Winter, Claus Eicheler, Edith Heerdegen, Günter Mack, Kai Fischer, Nastassja Kinski	Drama	
In freier Landschaft	Michael Kehlmann	Günther Schramm, Alexander Kerst, Heinrich Schweiger, Klausjürgen Wussow, George Pravda, Diana Körner	Drama	
Indiscreet	Wolfgang Glück	Andrea Jonasson, Harry Meyen	Comedy	
Invitation to the Dance	Peter F. Bringmann	Marius Müller-Westernhagen, Guido Gagliardi	Comedy	a.k.a. Invitation to Dance
Jane Is Jane Forever	Walter Bockmayer, Rolf Bührmann	Johanna König	Comedy	
Johnny West	Roald Koller	Rio Reiser, Kristina van Eyck, Jess Hahn	Drama, Music	
Eine Jugendliebe	Rainer Wolffhardt	Christian Berkel, Cornelia Köndgen, Petra Maria Grühn, Alexander Radszun, Dominique Horwitz	Drama, War	
Die Jugendstreiche des Knaben Karl	Franz Seitz	Robert Seidl, Walter Sedlmayr, Gustl Bayrhammer, Hans Clarin, Beppo Brem	Comedy	
Kante	Eberhard Itzenplitz	Peter Seum, Cornelia Meinhardt	Crime drama	
Die Katze und der Hahn	Günter Giesenfeld	Christiane Reiff	Drama	
Die Kette	Rolf von Sydow	Uschi Glas, Harald Leipnitz, Wolfgang Kieling, Herbert Fleischmann, Walter Kohut, Rosemarie Fendel	Mystery thriller	
Kinderseele	Guy Kubli	Gerd Böckmann	Short	
Kleinhoff Hotel	Carlo Lizzani	Corinne Cléry, Bruce Robinson, Katja Rupé, Werner Pochath, Peter Kern, Michele Placido	Thriller	Italian-West German co-production
Die Konsequenz	Wolfgang Petersen	Jürgen Prochnow, Ernst Hannawald	Drama	a.k.a. The Consequence. Petersen won the 1978 Adolf Grimme Awards
Kreutzer	Klaus Emmerich	Rüdiger Vogler, Axel Wagner	Crime	a.k.a. Hauptmann Kreutzer
Lady Dracula	Franz Josef Gottlieb	Evelyne Kraft, Theo Lingen, Stephen Boyd, Brad Harris, Eddi Arent, Walter Giller	Comedy, Horror	
The Left-Handed Woman	Peter Handke	Edith Clever, Bruno Ganz, Michael Lonsdale, Angela Winkler, Bernhard Wicki, Bernhard Minetti, Rüdiger Vogler, Gérard Depardieu	Drama	Entered into the 1978 Cannes Film Festival
Liebe das Leben, lebe das Lieben	Lutz Eisholz	Brigitte Mira, Bruno S., Peter Heinrich	Drama	a.k.a. Love Life, Live Loving
Maiden's War	Alf Brustellin, Bernhard Sinkel	Kaki Hunter, Adelheid Arndt, Matthias Habich, Hans Christian Blech, Walter Taub, Svatopluk Beneš, Jan Tříska	Drama, War	a.k.a. The Three Daughters
The Main Actor	Reinhard Hauff	Michael Schweiger, Mario Adorf, Vadim Glowna	Drama	a.k.a. The Leading Man
Der Mann mit dem Zylinder	Georg Ruest	Wolfgang Kieling, Uwe Friedrichsen, Claudia Wedekind	Musical	
Ein Mann wird jünger	Franz Peter Wirth	Arno Assmann, Angela Salloker, Ernst Jacobi, Günther Maria Halmer	Comedy	a.k.a. La rigenerazione
Mathilde Möhring	Wolfgang Schleif	Sabina Trooger	Drama	
Mensch Mutter	Peter Wehage	Hannelore Hoger, Anita Kupsch	Drama	a.k.a. Mother Is a Human Being
Menschenfresser	Rainer Boldt	Hans Peter Korff, Hans Helmut Dickow, Monica Bleibtreu	Thriller	
Möwengeschrei	Heinz Schirk	Gracia-Maria Kaus, Helmut Wildt, Ronald Nitschke	Drama	
Nachkommenschaften	Ludwig Cremer	Ralf Schermuly, Renate Küster, Irene Marhold, Anita Lochner, Uta Hallant, Barbara Morawiecz, Helga Feddersen	Drama	
Notwehr	Hartmut Griesmayr	Günter Lamprecht, Erik Schumann, Friedrich von Thun, Diether Krebs, Monika Lundi, Katrin Schaake, Marie-Luise Marjan, Bernd Tauber, Rolf Zacher, Guru Guru	Crime	
Oblomows Liebe	Claus Peter Witt	Wolfgang Reichmann, Johanna Elbauer, Herbert Bötticher, Hans Peter Hallwachs	Comedy	a.k.a. Oblomov
On Mount Chimborazo	Peter Beauvais	Heidemarie Hatheyer, Heinrich Giskes, Joachim Bißmeier	Drama	a.k.a. Auf dem Chimborazo
Operation Ganymed	Rainer Erler	Horst Frank, Dieter Laser, Jürgen Prochnow, Uwe Friedrichsen, Claus Theo Gärtner	Science fiction	
Der Operndirektor	Werner Schlechte	Peter Pasetti, Jan Niklas, Eva Maria Meineke, Ilse Pagé, Kathrin Ackermann	Comedy	a.k.a. The Director of the Opera
Petty Thieves	Michael Fengler	Marquard Bohm, Charly Wierczejewski, Rolf Zacher, Gerhard Olschewski	Crime	
Planübung	Wolfgang Petersen	Karl-Heinz von Hassel, Claudia Butenuth, Günter Lamprecht	Drama	
The Price	Thomas Fantl	Wolfgang Kieling, Rolf Henniger, Werner Hinz, Xenia Pörtner	Drama	
Das Projekt Honnef	Rudolf Nussgruber	Hans Helmut Dickow, Xenia Pörtner, Konrad Georg, Carl Lange	Biography	
Prosperos Traum	George Moorse	Peter Lühr, Vadim Glowna	Fantasy	a.k.a. Prospero's Dream a.k.a. The Tempest
Räuber und Gendarm	Hans-Jürgen Tögel	Eddi Arent, Hans Putz, Corny Collins	Crime comedy	
Reifezeugnis	Wolfgang Petersen	Nastassja Kinski, Klaus Schwarzkopf, Christian Quadflieg, Judy Winter	Crime drama	a.k.a. For Your Love Only. Tatort episode
Reinhard Heydrich – Manager des Terrors	Heinz Schirk	Dietrich Mattausch	War, Biography	
Das Rentenspiel	Dieter Wedel	Klaus Schwarzkopf, Klaus Löwitsch, Curt Bois, Monika Peitsch, Christian Quadflieg, Günter Strack	Docudrama	
A Rose: That's What Life Is All About	Hans-Christof Stenzel	Y Sa Lo	Road movie	
Roulette	Franz Peter Wirth	Gerd Böckmann, Werner Kreindl, Karl Michael Vogler, Eleonore Weisgerber	Drama	
Rückfälle	Peter Beauvais	Günter Lamprecht	Drama	
Rules for a Film About Anabaptists	Georg Brintrup		Documentary	West German-Italian co-production
Schulzeit	Rainer Wolffhardt	Hermann Treusch, Horst Sachtleben	Drama	
Schwindelig vor Geld und Liebe	Herbert Ballmann	Gustav Knuth, Eva Pflug, Dieter Thomas Heck, Wolfgang Völz	Comedy	
Scrounged Meals	Michael Verhoeven	Heinz Rühmann, Mario Adorf, Elisabeth Volkmann, René Deltgen, Karin Baal	Comedy	
The Serpent's Egg	Ingmar Bergman	Liv Ullmann, David Carradine, Gert Fröbe, Heinz Bennent	Drama	American-West German co-production
The Soldiers	Peter Beauvais	Anita Lochner, Siemen Rühaak, Klaus Hoffmann, Arno Assmann	Drama	
Sorgen ohne Noth	Michael Günther	Klaus Höhne, Barbara Freier, Simone Rethel, Ralf Schermuly, Giovanni Früh, Alexander May, Klaus Schwarzkopf	Comedy	a.k.a. Sorgen ohne Not
La Soufrière	Werner Herzog		Documentary	a.k.a. La Soufrière – Warten auf eine unausweichliche Katastrophe
The Standard	Ottokar Runze	Simon Ward, Peter Cushing, Jon Finch, Wolfgang Preiss, Lil Dagover, Siegfried Rauch, Maria Perschy, Robert Hoffmann, Rudolf Prack, Friedrich von Ledebur	War	a.k.a. Battle Flag. West German-Austrian-Spanish co-production
Stark wie der Tod	Rainer Wolffhardt	Hermann Treusch, Donata Höffer, Renate Schroeter, Tilli Breidenbach, Sigfrit Steiner	Drama	
The Stationmaster's Wife	Rainer Werner Fassbinder	Kurt Raab, Elisabeth Trissenaar	Drama	a.k.a. Bolwieser
Stroszek	Werner Herzog	Bruno S., Eva Mattes, Clemens Scheitz, Wilhelm von Homburg, Burkhard Driest	Drama	
Sweethearts	Klaus Lemke	Cleo Kretschmer, Fatima Igramhan, Renate Zimmermann, Sabine Gurn	Comedy, Music	
Tausend Lieder ohne Ton	Claudia Holldack	Eva Mattes, Michael Tregor	Drama	a.k.a. 1000 Lieder ohne Ton
Teerosen	Rolf von Sydow	Maria Schell, O. W. Fischer, Ulli Philipp, Jan Niklas	Comedy	
Der Test	Lutz Büscher	Werner Rundshagen, Renate Küster	Comedy, Science fiction	
Die Teufelsbraut	Hans Dieter Schwarze	Ulrike Luderer, Lil Dagover, Wolfram Weniger, Udo Thomer, Werner Asam, Klaus Schwarzkopf	Comedy, Fantasy	
Three Swedes in Upper Bavaria	Sigi Rothemund	Ann Lündell, Inge Fock, Anika Egger, Gianni Garko	Sex comedy	a.k.a. 3 Sexy Girls in Tyrol
Ein Tisch zu viert	Michael Günther	René Deltgen, Camilla Spira, Ernst Fritz Fürbringer, Rose Renée Roth	Comedy	
Der Tod des Camilo Torres	Eberhard Itzenplitz	Gerd Böckmann, Wolfgang Wahl	Drama	a.k.a. Der Tod des Camilo Torres, oder: Die Wirklichkeit hält viel aus
Twilight's Last Gleaming	Robert Aldrich	Burt Lancaster, Richard Widmark, Charles Durning, Joseph Cotten, Melvyn Douglas	Thriller	American-West German co-production
Der Überläufer – Der Fall Wlassow	Hans Quest	Walther Reyer, Peter Fricke, Alexander Kerst	War, Docudrama	a.k.a. The Defector: Andrey Vlasov
Überlebenstraining	Frank Guthke	Manfred Reddemann, Horst Schick, Krista Keller, Franziska Bronnen	Drama	
Der unanständige Profit	Thomas Mitscherlich	Peter Fitz, Grischa Huber	Drama	a.k.a. The Indecent Profit
Uncle Silas	Wilhelm Semmelroth	Hannes Messemer, Cornelia Köndgen, Ellen Schwiers, Hans Jaray	Crime drama	
Und Rosa und Marilyn und ...	Hans Neuenfels	Elisabeth Trissenaar, Christiane Bruhn, Gottfried John	Drama	a.k.a. Two Kinds of Angel
Unendlich tief unten	Pete Ariel	Hans Peter Korff, Donata Höffer, Walter Kohut	Thriller	
Vanessa	Hubert Frank	Olivia Pascal	Softcore	
Das Verhör des Ernst Niekisch	Oswald Döpke	Hans Christian Blech	Docudrama	
Verkaufte Träume	Gabi Kubach	Barbara Sukowa, Reinhard Kolldehoff	Drama	
Die Vorstadtkrokodile	Wolfgang Becker	Wolfgang Sieling, Birgit Komanns, Heiner Beeker, Rita Ramachers, Martin Semmelrogge	Family	a.k.a. The Crocodiles
Waldrausch	Horst Hächler	Uschi Glas, Alexander Stephan, Siegfried Rauch, Sigfrit Steiner, Ralf Wolter, Anton Diffring	Drama	
Walter Hasenclever	Rolf Busch	Peter Lieck, Helmut Stauss, Angelika Bender, Christian Brückner, Heinz Giese, Werner Kreindl	Biography, War	a.k.a. Walter Hasenclever – Tod und Leben eines deutschen Dichters
The Wedding Feast	Karl Fruchtmann	Bruno Dallansky, Wolf Roth, Veronika Nowag-Jones, Uwe Dallmeier	Comedy	a.k.a. Das Hochzeitsfest a.k.a. Ein Hochzeitsfest
Der Weilburger Kadettenmord	Eberhard Itzenplitz	Claus Theo Gärtner, Stephan Schwartz, Klaus Hoffmann	History, Crime	
Who Saw Him Die?	Theodor Grädler	Thekla Carola Wied, Harald Leipnitz, Hans Caninenberg, Karl-Otto Alberty	Crime	
The Winslow Boy	Michael Kehlmann	Peter Weck, Marlies Engel, Karl-Maria Schley, Edda Seippel, Jan Niklas	Drama	a.k.a. Der Fall Winslow
Women in Hospital	Rolf Thiele	Horst Buchholz, Stephen Boyd, Karin Dor	Drama	
Zeit der Empfindsamkeit	Wilma Kottusch	Vera Tschechowa, Vadim Glowna	Drama	
Zero Hour	Edgar Reitz	Kai Taschner	War	

== 1978 ==
Title	Director	Cast	Genre	Notes
1982: Gutenbach	Michael Verhoeven	Gottfried John, Katja Rupé, Hartmut Becker	Science fiction	
Achtung, Chance!	Kurt Ulrich	Tommi Piper, Horst Niendorf, Horst Naumann, Ursula Dirichs, Monika John, Friedrich von Thun	Drama	
Adoptionen	Hartmut Griesmayr	Monika Lundi, Liane Hielscher, Manfred Seipold, Gitty Djamal, Helga Anders	Drama, Anthology	
Albert – Why?	Josef Rödl	Fritz Binner	Drama	
The All-Around Reduced Personality – Outtakes	Helke Sander	Helke Sander	Drama	a.k.a. The All-Round Reduced Personality – Redupers
Alzire, or The New Continent	Thomas Koerfer	Monica Bleibtreu, Hans Peter Korff, Rüdiger Vogler, Wolfram Berger, Verena Buss, Joaquín Hinojosa, François Simon, Roger Jendly	Drama	Swiss-West German co-production
Amanda	Klaus Überall	Herlinde Latzko, Eckart Dux, Monika Peitsch, Michael Hinz, Barbara Schöne, Bela Ernyey	Comedy	a.k.a. Die Traumfrau
Amor	Sławomir Mrożek, Jerzy Lipman	Andy Pap, Ingeborg Lapsien, Martin Lüttge, Regine Vergeen	Drama	
Amore	Klaus Lemke	Cleo Kretschmer, Pietro Giardini	Comedy	
Die Anstalt	Hans-Rüdiger Minow	Susanne Valerie Granzer, Wolfgang Preiss, Gerd Baltus	Drama	
The Assistant	Ludwig Cremer	Marius Müller-Westernhagen, Shmuel Rodensky, Doris Buchrucker, Ruth Hausmeister	Drama	a.k.a. Der Gehilfe
Auf den Hund gekommen	Rosemarie Fendel	Eva Ingeborg Scholz, Klaus Löwitsch	Crime comedy	
Auf freiem Fuss	Peter Keglevic	Manfred Lindlbauer, Erwin Leder, Hans Georg Nenning, Christine Csar	Crime drama	a.k.a. Auf freiem Fuß. Austrian-West German co-production
Die beiden Freundinnen	Axel Corti	Ulrike Bliefert, Erika Skrotzki, Stefan Wigger, Brigitte Mira	Crime	a.k.a. Die beiden Freundinnen und ihr Giftmord
Between Two Wars	Harun Farocki	Jeff Layton, Stefan Matousch	Drama	
The Birthday Party	Jürgen Flimm	Hans Christian Rudolph, Dieter Laser, Brigitte Mira, Ernst Jacobi	Drama	a.k.a. Die Geburtstagsfeier
Boeing Boeing	Dietrich Haugk	Sigmar Solbach, Frithjof Vierock	Comedy	
Brass Target	John Hough	Sophia Loren, John Cassavetes, Max von Sydow, Robert Vaughn, George Kennedy, Patrick McGoohan, Heinz Bennent, Sigfrit Steiner	Crime, War	American-West German-Swiss co-production
Die Bräute des Kurt Roidl	Gernot Friedel	Klaus Maria Brandauer	Comedy	Austrian-West German co-production
Buckel	Thomas Fantl	Gerd Baltus, Fritz Nydegger, Angelika Bender	Drama	
Cella	Eberhard Itzenplitz	Christine Csar, Bruno Dallansky, Lotte Ledl, Walther Reyer	Drama	West German-Austrian co-production
Children's Day	Erich Neureuther	Walter Giller, Loni von Friedl, Gerd Baltus, Witta Pohl, Klaus Höhne	Drama	a.k.a. Kinderparty
The Condemned of Altona	Pinkas Braun	Doris Kunstmann, Judy Winter, Uwe Friedrichsen, Ernst Schröder	Drama	a.k.a. Die Eingeschlossenen
Despair	Rainer Werner Fassbinder	Dirk Bogarde, Andréa Ferréol, Klaus Löwitsch, Bernhard Wicki	Drama	West German-French co-production
Diary of a Seducer	Michael Hild	Adelheid Arndt, Rüdiger Kirschstein	Drama	a.k.a. The Seducer's Diary
Das Doppelleben des Wilfried E.	Wolfgang Storch	Siegfried Wischnewski, Elga Sorbas, Matthias Ponnier, Rüdiger Kirschstein	Drama	a.k.a. You've Made Your Bed: Now Lie in It
Dr. Katzenbergers Badereise	Gerd Winkler	Alwin Michael Rueffer, Jutta Speidel, Jörg Pleva	Comedy	
Ehrlich währt am längsten	Arno Assmann	Reiner Schöne, Anita Lochner, Edith Heerdegen, Frithjof Vierock	Crime comedy	a.k.a. Plunder
Eifersucht	Georg Wildhagen	Heidelinde Weis, Günther Ungeheuer	Comedy	a.k.a. Jealousy. Austrian-West German co-production
Eisbären	Wilm ten Haaf	Hannelore Elsner, Joachim Bißmeier	Drama	a.k.a. Polar Bears
Elfriede	Wolfgang Panzer	Vérénice Rudolph, Nikol Voigtländer, Kai Fischer	Drama	
Das Ende einer Karriere	Christa Maar	Elisabeth Trissenaar	Drama	
Enough Stupidity in Every Wise Man	Eberhard Itzenplitz	Martin Lüttge, Ruth Maria Kubitschek, Gerd Baltus, Gisela Trowe, Bettina Kenter, Volkert Kraeft	Comedy	a.k.a. Eine Dummheit macht auch der Gescheiteste
Die Farbe des Himmels	Thomas Hartwig	Hans Brenner, Rudolf Lenz	Drama	
Fear	Dagmar Damek	Judy Winter, Matthias Habich, Manfred Zapatka	Drama	a.k.a. Angst
Fedora	Billy Wilder	William Holden, Marthe Keller, Hildegard Knef, Mario Adorf, Gottfried John, José Ferrer, Michael York, Henry Fonda	Drama	West German-French co-production
Feuerwasser	Wolfgang Staudte	Hans Helmut Dickow, Helmut Qualtinger, Thomas Holtzmann, Kornelia Boje	Drama	
The Fifth Commandment	Duccio Tessari	Helmut Berger, Peter Hooten, Evelyne Kraft, Umberto Orsini, Lorella De Luca, Udo Kier	Crime	a.k.a. The 5th Commandment. Italian-West German co-production
The First Waltz	Doris Dörrie	Christopher Thomas, Katharina Hembus	Drama	
Fist in the Pocket	Max Willutzki	Ernst Hannawald, Manfred Krug, Ursela Monn, Tommi Piper	Drama	
Fixer	Klaus-Peter Krippendorff	Gerhard Theisen, Ronald Nitschke	Drama	
Flaming Hearts	Walter Bockmayer, Rolf Bührmann	Peter Kern, Barbara Valentin	Drama	Entered into the 28th Berlin International Film Festival
Ein freier Tag	Hermann Treusch	Erika Skrotzki, Jochen Striebeck	Drama	
Der Friede von Locarno	Eberhard Itzenplitz	Hans Korte	Docudrama	a.k.a. The Locarno Treaties
Ein Frieden für die armen Seelen	Walter Davy	Gerd Böckmann, Andrea Jonasson, Christian Quadflieg, Marianne Nentwich, Kurt Nachmann, Bruno Dallansky	History	a.k.a. Ein Frieden für die armen Seelen – Der Wiener Kongress. West German-Austrian-Swiss co-production
Friedrich Schachmann wird verwaltet	Eberhard Pieper	Wolfgang Kieling, Gerhard Olschewski, Lina Carstens, Hans-Michael Rehberg, Hans Peter Korff	Drama	
Der Führerschein	Thomas Engel	Witta Pohl, Klaus Herm, Dieter Kirchlechner, Ingeborg Schöner, Jochen Busse	Drama	
Germany in Autumn	Alf Brustellin, Hans Peter Cloos, Rainer Werner Fassbinder, Alexander Kluge, Beate Mainka-Jellinghaus, Maximiliane Mainka, Edgar Reitz, Katja Rupé, Volker Schlöndorff, Peter Schubert, Bernhard Sinkel	Rainer Werner Fassbinder, Angela Winkler, Mario Adorf, Helmut Griem, Heinz Bennent, Vadim Glowna, Hannelore Hoger, Wolf Biermann	Anthology	Entered into the 28th Berlin International Film Festival
Gesche Gottfried	Karl Fruchtmann	Sabine Sinjen, Tilo Prückner, Wolf Roth, Rolf Becker	History, Crime	
Geschichte einer Liebe	Dagmar Damek	Bruno Ganz, Rosemarie Filser, Cornelia Froboess	Drama	a.k.a. April: The Story of a Love Affair
The Girl from Nowhere	Jochen Richter	Zeli Barbier, Heinz Trixner, Lina Carstens, Wolfgang Büttner	Science fiction	a.k.a. Eurydike
The Glass Cell	Hans W. Geißendörfer	Helmut Griem, Brigitte Fossey, Dieter Laser, Walter Kohut, Günter Strack, Bernhard Wicki	Crime drama	
Good-for-Nothing	Bernhard Sinkel	Jacques Breuer, Eva Maria Meineke, Wolfgang Reichmann, Matthias Habich, Mareike Carrière	Comedy	
Grüß Gott, ich komm von drüben	Tom Toelle	Hans Christian Blech	Comedy	
The Guardian and His Poet	Percy Adlon	Rolf Illig, Horst Raspe	Biography	a.k.a. Der Vormund und sein Dichter
Der harte Handel	Uli Edel	Tilo Prückner	Drama	
Heinrich Heine	Klaus Emmerich	Christoph Bantzer, Barbara Sukowa, Walter Rilla, Ivan Desny, Rosemarie Fendel	Biography	
Heroin 4	Michael Günther	Claus Theo Gärtner, Matthias Ponnier, Bernd Herberger, Christoph Felsenstein, Léonie Thelen, Martin Semmelrogge	Drama	
A Hunting Accident	Emil Loteanu	Galina Belyayeva, Oleg Yankovskiy, Kirill Lavrov, Leonid Markov, Svetlana Toma, Grigore Grigoriu	Romantic Drama	a.k.a. Мой ласковый и нежный зверь Soviet-West German co-production; Entered into the 1978 Cannes Film Festival
Ein Hut von ganz spezieller Art	Hans Dieter Schwarze	Hannes Messemer, Marius Müller-Westernhagen, Susanne Beck, Carl-Heinz Schroth, Käthe Haack, Herbert Bötticher	Comedy, Anthology	
I See This Land from Afar	Christian Ziewer	Aníbal Reyna, Pablo Lira, Angela Krain	Drama	a.k.a. Aus der Ferne sehe ich dieses Land
In a Year of 13 Moons	Rainer Werner Fassbinder	Volker Spengler, Ingrid Caven, Gottfried John, Eva Mattes, Isolde Barth, Elisabeth Trissenaar	Drama	
Inn of the Sinful Daughters	Walter Boos	Gina Janssen	Sex comedy	
Jugend, Liebe und die Wacht am Rhein	Oswald Döpke	Stephan Schwartz, Werner Hinz, Angelika Bender, Sabine von Maydell, Alexander Radszun, Günter Strack, Constanze Engelbrecht	Biography	a.k.a. Young Count Kessler a.k.a. Count Harry Kessler
Just a Gigolo	David Hemmings	David Bowie, Marlene Dietrich, Sydne Rome, Kim Novak, Curd Jürgens, Maria Schell	Drama	
Karneval	Werner Schlechte	Michael Degen, Elfriede Irrall	Drama	
Keiner kann was dafür	Uschi Reich	Michael Fitz, Christine Kammerer, Agnes Neuwirth	Drama	West German-Austrian-Swiss co-production
Der keusche Lebemann	Alfred Weidenmann	Harald Juhnke, Barbara Schöne, Grit Boettcher, Amadeus August, Herbert Herrmann	Drama	a.k.a. The Chaste Libertine
Klaras Mutter	Tankred Dorst	Katharina Tüschen, Elisabeth Schwarz, Marius Müller-Westernhagen	Drama	a.k.a. Klara's Mother
Kleine bunte Freudenspender	Eberhard Pieper	Brigitte Horney, Wolfgang Wahl, Marlies Engel, Karl-Heinz von Hassel	Drama, Anthology	
Der kleine Godard an das Kuratorium junger deutscher Film	Hellmuth Costard	Hellmuth Costard, Jean-Luc Godard, Rainer Werner Fassbinder, Hark Bohm	Documentary	
Knife in the Head	Reinhard Hauff	Bruno Ganz, Angela Winkler, Hans Christian Blech, Heinz Hoenig	Drama	
Krabat – The Sorcerer's Apprentice	Karel Zeman	—N/a	Animated	Czechoslovak-West German co-production
Lady Audley's Secret	Wilhelm Semmelroth	Susanne Uhlen, Christian Wolff, Hans Caninenberg, Katerina Jacob, Siegfried Wischnewski, Helga Anders	Crime drama	
The Lady of the Camellias	Tom Toelle	Erika Pluhar, Klaus Hoffmann, Gert Westphal, Friedrich von Thun, Sky du Mont	Drama	
Das Lamm des Armen	Oswald Döpke	Horst Frank, Wolf Roth, Angelika Bender, Günter Strack, Rolf Becker, Günther Ungeheuer	Historical drama	a.k.a. Un caprice de Bonaparte
Liebe und Abenteuer	Gisela Stelly	Birgit Hoffmeister	Drama	
Love Hotel in Tyrol	Franz Antel	Fritz Muliar, Heinz Reincke	Sex comedy	West German-Austrian co-production
Mach's gut, Florian	Rolf Hädrich	Klaus-Peter Grap	Drama	
Madame X: An Absolute Ruler	Ulrike Ottinger	Tabea Blumenschein	Fantasy	
The Man in the Rushes	Manfred Purzer	Jean Sorel, Erika Pluhar, Nathalie Delon, Bernhard Wicki, Heinz Bennent, Tilo Prückner	Drama	
Ein Mann für alle Fälle	Wolfgang Liebeneiner	Harald Juhnke, Johanna von Koczian, Nadja Tiller, Iris Berben, Gerlinde Locker, Andrea Rau, Chariklia Baxevanos, Anita Kupsch, Hanne Wieder, Barbara Schöne, Hans Clarin	Comedy	
Marija	Horst Flick	Wolfgang Büttner, Anita Lochner, Christine Wodetzky, Günter Lamprecht, Gottfried John, Wolf Roth, Bernd Tauber, Heinrich Giskes, Rüdiger Kirschstein	Drama	a.k.a. Maria
Martha und Laura auf See	Hanna Laura Klar	Adelheid Arndt, Christiane Lemm, Günter Lamprecht	Drama	
Melody in Love	Hubert Frank	Sascha Hehn, Melody O'Bryan	Softcore	
Mittags auf dem Roten Platz	Dieter Wedel	Monica Bleibtreu, Michael Degen, Claus Theo Gärtner	Drama	
Ein Mord am Lietzensee	Lutz Büscher	Renate Küster, Heinz Hoenig, Heinz Engelmann	Crime	
Moritz, Dear Moritz	Hark Bohm	Michael Kebschull, Kerstin Wehlmann, Grete Mosheim	Drama	Entered into the 28th Berlin International Film Festival
Mulligans Rückkehr	Helmut Käutner	Helmut Qualtinger	Drama	
My Fat Friend	Gig Malzacher	Johanna Liebeneiner, Wolfgang Kieling	Comedy	a.k.a. Meine dicke Freundin
Das Nebelloch	Eberhard Itzenplitz	Veronika Fitz, Udo Thomer, Toni Berger, Ulrich Faulhaber, Martin Sperr, Werner Asam, Wilfried Klaus	Drama	a.k.a. Das Nebelloch – Eine Geschichte aus Bayern
Oh, diese Männer	Franz Josef Wild	Barbara Rütting, Violetta Ferrari, Michael Hinz	Comedy	a.k.a. Les Bonshommes
On the Move	Adolf Winkelmann	Detlev Quandt, Ludger Schnieder, Anastasios Avgeris	Road movie	a.k.a. Die Abfahrer
The Other Smile	Robert van Ackeren	Katja Rupé, Elisabeth Trissenaar, Heinz Ehrenfreund	Drama	
Passion Flower Hotel	André Farwagi	Nastassja Kinski, Gerry Sundquist	Comedy	a.k.a. Boarding School
Paul kommt zurück	Peter F. Bringmann	Manfred Krug, Tilo Prückner, Heinz Hoenig, Günther Ungeheuer	Crime	
The Pentecost Outing	Michael Günther	Elisabeth Bergner, Martin Held	Comedy	a.k.a. Der Pfingstausflug
Platzangst	Thomas Schamoni	Christine Wodetzky	Drama	
Plutonium	Rainer Erler	Charlotte Kerr, Wolf Roth, Anton Diffring	Thriller	
Popcorn and Ice Cream	Franz Josef Gottlieb	Olivia Pascal, Benny, Zachi Noy	Comedy	
The Power of Darkness	Oswald Döpke	Peter Seum, Barbara Morawiecz, Sigfrit Steiner, Werner Hinz	Drama	
The Power of Men is the Patience of Women	Cristina Perincioli	Elisabeth Walinski, Eberhard Feik, Barbara Stanek	Drama	
Probezeit	Peter Voiss	Mariele Millowitsch	Drama	
Red Rings of Fear	Alberto Negrin	Fabio Testi, Christine Kaufmann, Ivan Desny	Thriller	Italian-Spanish-West German co-production
The Reign of Naples	Werner Schroeter	Ida Di Benedetto	Drama	a.k.a. The Kingdom of Naples. Italian-West German co-production
Les Rendez-vous d'Anna	Chantal Akerman	Aurore Clément, Jean-Pierre Cassel, Magali Noël, Helmut Griem, Hanns Zischler, Lea Massari	Drama	Belgian-French-West German co-production
Rhinegold	Niklaus Schilling	Elke Haltaufderheide, Rüdiger Kirschstein, Gunther Malzacher	Drama	Entered into the 28th Berlin International Film Festival
Rick und Ritschi	Wolfgang Mühlbauer	Uwe Ochsenknecht, Rüdiger Friedrichs	Comedy	
The Rider on the White Horse	Alfred Weidenmann	John Phillip Law, Gert Fröbe, Anita Ekström, Lina Carstens, Reinhard Kolldehoff, Vera Tschechowa	Drama	a.k.a. The Ghostly Rider a.k.a. The Dykemaster
Die Rose und die Nachtigall	Frank Guthke	Cihan Ünal, Petra Verena Milchert	Drama	a.k.a. Gül ve Bülbül
Rosi	Helmut Meewes	Anita Kupsch	Comedy	a.k.a. Rosi – Eine Geschichte aus Berlin
Schwarz und weiß wie Tage und Nächte	Wolfgang Petersen	Bruno Ganz, René Deltgen, Gila von Weitershausen	Drama	a.k.a. Black and White Like Day and Night
The Second Awakening of Christa Klages	Margarethe von Trotta	Tina Engel, Silvia Reize, Katharina Thalbach, Marius Müller-Westernhagen	Crime	
Die seltsamen Begegnungen des Prof. Tarantoga	Chuck Kerremans	Richard Münch, Peter Striebeck	Science fiction	
Short Letter to the Long Goodbye	Herbert Vesely	Geraldine Chaplin, Thomas Astan, Alexandra Hay	Drama	a.k.a. Short Letter, Long Farewell
The Singers	Michael Verhoeven	Katerina Jacob, Jan Niklas, Gerd Baltus, Klaus Knuth, Peter Matić, Fred Stillkrauth, Michael Gahr, Christine Kaufmann, Alfred Edel	Drama	a.k.a. Das Männerquartett a.k.a. Das Ochsenfurter Männerquartett
Skyline	Volker Landsberg	Matthias Fuchs	Drama	
Slavers	Jürgen Goslar	Trevor Howard, Ron Ely, Britt Ekland, Cameron Mitchell, Ray Milland, Ken Gampu	Action	
Soul Sister	Dietmar Buchmann	Tatjana Blacher, Holmes McHenry	Drama	
Späte Liebe	Ilse Hofmann	Karl-Maria Schley, Ehmi Bessel	Drama	
Das Spiel	Peter Adam	Lutz Reichert, Monica Teuber	Drama	
Spiel der Verlierer	Christian Hohoff	Jörg von Liebenfelß, Maria Schell, Claus Holm, Martina Winkelbach, Margit Carstensen	Drama	
Der Spinnenmörder	Gerhard Klingenberg	Dietmar Schönherr, Alma Seidler, Peter Arens	Thriller	a.k.a. The Bat
The Spirit of the Yellow Plum	Eberhard Pieper	Wolfgang Kieling, Gert Haucke, Hans-Michael Rehberg, Hans Peter Korff, Witta Pohl, Gerhard Olschewski, Monica Bleibtreu, Heinz Baumann, Wolfgang Wahl	Comedy	a.k.a. Der Geist der Mirabelle
Spuk in Felixburg	Rudolf Nussgruber	Christine Böhm, Dirk Dautzenberg, Heinz Meier, Gerhart Lippert, Joost Siedhoff	Comedy	
Stalins letzter Bourgeois	Gerlach Fiedler	Friedhelm Ptok, Brigitte Grothum, Wolfgang Büttner, Martin Hirthe	Biography	a.k.a. Stalins letzter Bourgeois – Die allmähliche Vernichtung des Michail Bulgakow
Statements After an Arrest Under the Immorality Act	George Moorse	Hanna Schygulla, Günther Kaufmann	Drama	
Strafsache gegen F.	Wolfgang Glück	Günter Lamprecht	Crime	
Die Straße	Volker Vogeler	Ossy Kolmann, Arthur Brauss, Franz Buchrieser, Georg Lehn	Drama	Austrian-West German co-production
Strauberg ist da	Mischa Gallé	Michel Piccoli, Bernadette Lafont, Theodor Kotulla	Drama	(Shot in 1975)
Stützen der Gesellschaft	Werner Schlechte	Werner Kreindl, Uwe Friedrichsen, Jörg Pleva, Anita Lochner, Dinah Hinz	Drama	a.k.a. Pillars of Society
Sultry Days	Hajo Gies	Daniel Gélin, Markus Klimmek, Katerina Jacob	Drama	
The Tailor from Ulm	Edgar Reitz	Tilo Prückner, Vadim Glowna, Hannelore Elsner	Biography	Entered into the 11th Moscow International Film Festival
Three Men on a Horse	Imo Moszkowicz	Reiner Schöne	Comedy	a.k.a. 3 Men on a Horse
Der Tiefstapler	Karlheinz Bieber	Gert Fröbe, Georg Thomalla, Charo López, José Lifante	Comedy	
Tod eines Vaters	Thomas Mauch	Marianne Hoppe, Miguel Herz-Kestranek	Drama	
Ein typischer Fall	Fritz Umgelter	Hermann Treusch, Cordula Trantow, Maria Körber	Crime	
Der Unbekannte	Hartmut Griesmayr	Gerd Baltus, Monica Bleibtreu, Helga Anders	Drama	
The Unicorn	Peter Patzak	Gila von Weitershausen, Peter Vogel, Miriam Spoerri, Christiane Rücker, Anton Diffring	Drama	
Ein unruhiges Jahr	Kristian Kühn	Adelheid Arndt	Drama	
Vorhang auf, wir spielen Mord	Fritz Umgelter	Günter Strack, Sigmar Solbach, Mijou Kovacs, Anita Kupsch, Hans Söhnker	Crime	a.k.a. Enter Murderers
Wann heiraten Sie meine Frau?	Joachim Preen	Diether Krebs, Brigitte Mira, Agnes Dünneisen, Andrea L'Arronge	Comedy	
Weit weg von Hagedingen	Jan Kauenhowen	Ruth Hellberg, Willy Leyrer	Drama	
When Hitler Stole Pink Rabbit	Ilse Hofmann	Ariane Jeßulat, Martin Benrath, Elisabeth Trissenaar, Alexander Rosenberg, Sigfrit Steiner	Drama	
Who Is Killing the Great Chefs of Europe?	Ted Kotcheff	Jacqueline Bisset, George Segal, Robert Morley, Jean-Pierre Cassel, Philippe Noiret, Jean Rochefort	Black comedy	American-West German co-production
Who Killed Santa Claus?	Wilm ten Haaf	Irene Marhold, Christiane Krüger, Karl Lieffen, Martin Semmelrogge	Thriller	a.k.a. Eine seltsame Bescherung
Wilhelm Meister's Apprenticeship	Michael Mrakitsch	Hanns Zischler, Christine Buchegger, Gertraud Jesserer, Elfriede Irrall, Petra Maria Grühn	Drama	a.k.a. Wilhelm Meisters Lehrjahre – Roman einer Karriere
Winterspelt	Eberhard Fechner	Hans Christian Blech, Katharina Thalbach, Claus Theo Gärtner, Henning Schlüter, Ulrich von Dobschütz, George Roubicek, Frederick Jaeger, George Sewell, David Healy, Garrick Hagon, James Bate, Jay Benedict	War	a.k.a. Winterspelt 1944
Wo geht's lang, Kutti?	Tom Toelle	Elmar Nettekoven, Hans Beerhenke, Eva-Maria Hagen	Drama	
The Woman Across the Way	Hans Noever	Franciszek Pieczka, Petra Maria Grühn	Thriller	
A Woman with Responsibilities	Ula Stöckl	Christina Scholz	Drama	a.k.a. A Woman with Responsibility
Die Wunder der Erziehung	Gernot Eigler	Christoph Quest, Karl Lieffen	Drama	a.k.a. Das Wunder der Erziehung
Wunnigel	Oswald Döpke	Siegfried Wischnewski, Peter Fricke, Susanne Uhlen, Sigfrit Steiner, Thomas Holtzmann	Comedy	
Yesterday's Tomorrow	Wolfgang Staudte	Mel Ferrer, Pola Kinski, Hannelore Schroth, Martin Lüttge	Drama	a.k.a. Zwischengleis
Zeit zum Aufstehn	Ludwig Cremer	Franz Xaver Kroetz, Lisa Fitz, Arthur Brauss	Drama	
Zwei auf der Kippe	Thomas Fantl	Claus Theo Gärtner, Angelika Bender	Drama	

== 1979 ==
Title	Director	Cast	Genre	Notes
1+1=3 [de]	Heidi Genée	Adelheid Arndt, Dominik Graf, Christoph Quest	Comedy	a.k.a. One Plus One Equals Three
Der Abschusstag	Wolfgang Liebeneiner	Frederick Jaeger, Witta Pohl, Johanna Liebeneiner, Jürgen Thormann	Comedy, War	a.k.a. Der Abschußtag
Accommodations	Georg Marischka	Uschi Glas, Ute Willing, Bernd Herzsprung	Comedy	a.k.a. Appartement für drei
Aktion Abendsonne	Diethard Klante	Ernst Stankovski, Rudolf Schündler	Science fiction	
Der Allerletzte	Klaus Lemke	Cleo Kretschmer	Comedy	
Americathon	Neal Israel	John Ritter	Comedy	American production with West German money
The American Success Company	William Richert	Jeff Bridges, Bianca Jagger, Ned Beatty, Belinda Bauer, Steven Keats	Comedy	American-West German co-production
Andreas Vöst	Eberhard Itzenplitz	Jörg Hube	Drama	
Anton Sittinger	Rainer Wolffhardt	Walter Sedlmayr, Veronika Fitz	Drama	
Arabian Nights	Klaus Lemke	Cleo Kretschmer, Wolfgang Fierek, Christine Zierl	Comedy	
Der Architekt der Sonnenstadt	Renke Korn	Frank Glaubrecht, Nikol Voigtländer	Drama	
Army of Lovers or Revolt of the Perverts	Rosa von Praunheim		Documentary	
Belle	Wolfgang Storch	Udo Vioff	Thriller	a.k.a. Bellas Tod a.k.a. La Mort de Belle
Beware of Pity	Édouard Molinaro	Mathieu Carrière, Marie-Hélène Breillat, Jean Desailly, Silvia Reize	Drama	a.k.a. Ungeduld des Herzens. French-West German-Austrian co-production
Beware of Schwarzenbeck	May Spils	Werner Enke, Sabine von Maydell, Benno Hoffmann	Comedy	a.k.a. Wehe, wenn Schwarzenbeck kommt
Blauer Himmel, den ich nur ahne	Stephan Rinser	Jörg Hube	Biography	
Bloodline	Terence Young	Audrey Hepburn, Ben Gazzara, James Mason, Romy Schneider, Omar Sharif, Gert Fröbe, Irene Papas, Maurice Ronet, Wolfgang Preiss, Marcel Bozzuffi, Pinkas Braun, Ivan Desny, Vadim Glowna, Walter Kohut	Thriller	American-West German co-production
Bored Teenagers	Wolfgang Büld	Ian Moorse, Monika Greser, Steve "Roadent" Connolly, The Adverts	Music	a.k.a. Brennende Langeweile
Breakthrough	Andrew V. McLaglen	Richard Burton, Robert Mitchum, Rod Steiger, Curd Jürgens, Helmut Griem, Michael Parks, Horst Janson, Klaus Löwitsch, Joachim Hansen, Sieghardt Rupp, Werner Pochath, Günter Meisner, Christoph Waltz, Dieter Schidor	War	a.k.a. Steiner – Das Eiserne Kreuz, 2. Teil
Burning Bright	Wilm ten Haaf	Peter Ehrlich, Giulia Follina, Herbert Fleischmann, Manfred Lehmann	Drama	a.k.a. Die wilde Flamme
The Children	Kurt Wilhelm	Karl Schönböck, Toni Berger, Mijou Kovacs, Alexander Waechter, Rudolf Schündler	Comedy	
Cola, Candy, Chocolate	Sigi Rothemund	Olivia Pascal, Ursula Buchfellner, Christine Zierl, Herbert Fux	Sex comedy	
Cold Homeland	W. Werner Schaefer, Peter F. Steinbach	Nikolaus Cohnen, Dietlinde Turban, Margit Carstensen, Rudolf Schündler	Drama	
David	Peter Lilienthal	Mario Fischel, Walter Taub, Irena Vrkljan, Eva Mattes	Drama	Won the Golden Bear at Berlin
The Day Elvis Came to Bremerhaven	Peter F. Bringmann	Wolfgang Drygalla, Petra Bigaj, Michael Shelley	Drama	
Denken heißt zum Teufel beten	Nathan Jariv	Ulrike Luderer	Drama	
Das Ding	Uli Edel	Wayne Laryea, Uwe Ochsenknecht, Stephan Schwartz, Steve "Roadent" Connolly, Caroline Chaniolleau, Ulla Jacobsson	Crime thriller	
Direktmandat	Daniel Christoff	Gudo Hoegel, Stefan Wigger, Karin Anselm, Diether Krebs	Drama	
Dracula Blows His Cool	Carl Schenkel	Gianni Garko, Betty Vergès, Ralf Wolter	Sex comedy	
Drei Bürger zum Geburtstag	Joachim Roering	Wolf Roth, Ulrich Matschoss, Klaus Höhne, Paul Edwin Roth	Comedy	a.k.a. 3 Bürger zum Geburtstag
Drei Freundinnen	Konrad Sabrautzky	Karin Baal, Brigitte Janner, Kyra Mladeck, Gerd Baltus, Arthur Brauss	Drama	
Einzelzimmer	Wolfgang Panzer	Brigitte Horney, Rudolf Platte, Tilli Breidenbach	Drama	
The End of the Rainbow	Uwe Frießner	Thomas Kufahl	Drama	
Es begann bei Tiffany	Wolfgang Becker	Rutger Hauer, Siegfried Wischnewski, Katerina Jacob, Hans Clarin, Heinz Schubert, Diether Krebs	Crime comedy	
Esch: The Anarchist	Rainer Boldt	Hans Peter Korff	Drama	a.k.a. The Sleepwalkers: The Anarchist
Every Man a Murderer	Claus Peter Witt	Joachim Dietmar Mues, Claudia Butenuth	Drama	a.k.a. Ein Mord, den jeder begeht
Der Sturz	Alf Brustellin	Franz Buchrieser, Hannelore Elsner, Wolfgang Kieling, Eva Maria Meineke, Carl Duering	Drama	lit. 'The Fall'
Fallstudien	Hartmut Griesmayr	Michaela May, Monica Bleibtreu, Monika Lundi, Nina Hoger, Vérénice Rudolph, Bernd Tauber, Diether Krebs	Drama, Anthology	
Feuerzeichen	Rainer Boldt	Adrian Mendoza, Vincent Thomas	Drama	a.k.a. Fire Signals
The First Polka	Klaus Emmerich	Maria Schell, Erland Josephson, Guido Wieland, Ernst Stankovski, Claus Theo Gärtner	Drama, War	Entered into the 29th Berlin International Film Festival
Flamme empor	Eberhard Schubert	Mareike Carrière, Hans-Jürgen Schatz, Rudolf Schündler	Drama	
Fleisch	Rainer Erler	Jutta Speidel, Wolf Roth, Herbert Herrmann, Charlotte Kerr	Thriller	a.k.a. Spare Parts
Fluchthelfer gesucht	Gerd Oelschlegel	Sabine Buschmann, Hugo Egon Balder	Drama	
Die Fluchtlinie	Klaus Müller-Laue, Herbert Rimbach	Michaela May, Matthias Ponnier, Marina de Graaf	Drama	
Flugversuche	Rainer Wolffhardt	Adelheid Arndt, Ulrich Pfeffer	Drama	
Frontiers of Darkness	Wolf Gremm	Günter Lamprecht, Antje Hagen	Drama	a.k.a. Die Schattengrenze
Gedankenketten	Dieter Lemmel	Klaus Barner, Monika Gabriel, Silvia Reize, Rolf Becker, Peter Schiff	Drama	
Gefangen in Frankreich: Theodor Fontane im Krieg 1870/71	Theo Mezger	Hans Caninenberg, Karl-Heinz von Hassel, Werner Schumacher, Benno Sterzenbach	War	
Die Geisterbehörde	Wilm ten Haaf	Erik Ode, Herbert Fleischmann, Michael Hinz, Barbara Schöne	Comedy	a.k.a. Die Geisterbehörde – Eine Geschichte, die überall spielen könnte
Geldsorgen	Frank Guthke	Joost Siedhoff, Gert Haucke	Crime comedy	
Gesundheit	Peter Patzak	Ralf Schermuly	Drama	
Geteilte Freude	Gabi Kubach	Claudia Demarmels, Claudia Burckhardt, Marius Müller-Westernhagen, Dominik Graf	Comedy	
Gitanes	Thees Klahn	Michael Lederer, Dieter Ziegler	Drama	
Goetz von Berlichingen of the Iron Hand	Wolfgang Liebeneiner, Harald Reinl	Raimund Harmstorf, Michèle Mercier, Silvia Reize, Klausjürgen Wussow, Reiner Schöne, Joachim Hansen, Ernst Stankovski	Historical	
The Good Doctor	Ludwig Cremer	Boy Gobert	Comedy	a.k.a. Der gute Doktor
Grandison	Achim Kurz	Marlène Jobert, Jean Rochefort, Helmut Qualtinger	Crime	West German-French co-production
The Great Sebastians	Wolfgang Spier	Johanna von Koczian, Peter Pasetti, Werner Kreindl, Heinrich Schweiger, Barbara Schöne	Comedy	
Die gütigen Augen des Herrn L.	Thomas Fantl	Michael Hinz	Crime comedy	
The Hamburg Syndrome	Peter Fleischmann	Helmut Griem, Fernando Arrabal, Carline Seiser, Tilo Prückner, Ulrich Wildgruber	Disaster	West German-French co-production
Hatschi!	Eugen York	Reiner Schöne, Karl Michael Vogler, Dirk Dautzenberg, Friedrich Schoenfelder	Comedy, Science fiction	
High Season	Claus Tinney	Sascha Hehn, Margit Geissler, Maritta Jödicke	Comedy	a.k.a. Nackt und heiß auf Mykonos. West German-Greek co-production
Hotel Paradies	Michael Günther	Heinz Schubert, Ilja Richter, Gaby Gasser, Evelyn Hamann	Comedy	a.k.a. L'Hôtel du libre échange
Ihr 106. Geburtstag	Thomas Engel	Inge Meysel, Dietmar Schönherr, Dietlinde Turban, Ernst Schröder	Comedy	a.k.a. Mamouret
In des Waldes tiefsten Gründen	Wolfgang F. Henschel	Wolfgang Kieling, Hannes Messemer, Siegfried Wischnewski, Lukas Ammann	Comedy	a.k.a. In des Waldes tiefsten Gründen – Eine heitere Weinreise nach Kurt Tucholsky
Is This Fate?	Helga Reidemeister		Documentary	a.k.a. Von wegen Schicksal
It Can Only Get Worse	Helmut Dietl	Towje Kleiner	Comedy	Short edited version of the TV series Der ganz normale Wahnsinn
Jenseits von Schweden	Carlheinz Caspari	Karl Walter Diess, Christian Berkel, Franz Rudnick, Marianne Kehlau	Drama	
Knock	Fritz Umgelter	Helmuth Lohner	Comedy	a.k.a. Dr. Knock oder Der Triumph der Medizin
Das Komplott	Dieter Wedel	Andrea Jonasson, Wolfgang Wahl, Herbert Mensching, Monika Peitsch, Gerd Böckmann	Drama	
Der kostbare Gast	Dominik Graf	Donata Höffer, Dietrich Mattausch, Charles Brauer	Drama	
Kotte	Horst Flick	Jürgen Prochnow	Drama	
Kümmert euch nicht um Sokrates	Frank Guthke	Will Quadflieg, Christian Quadflieg, Willi Kowalj, Friedrich W. Bauschulte	Drama	
Kur in Travemünde	Peter Beauvais	Doris Schade, Karlheinz Böhm	Drama	
Der Landvogt von Greifensee	Wilfried Bolliger	Christian Quadflieg, Adelheid Arndt, Silvia Dionisio, Alida Valli, Christian Kohlund	Drama	Swiss-West German co-production
Last Love	Ingemo Engström	Angela Winkler, Rüdiger Vogler	Drama	
The Last Years of Childhood	Norbert Kückelmann	Gerhard Gundel	Drama	
Lauter anständige Menschen	Diethard Klante	Lukas Grohne, Katharina Tüschen, Hilde Lermann, Carline Seiser	Crime drama	
Der Lebemann	Axel Corti	Heinz Trixner, Ulli Maier	Crime	Austrian-West German co-production
Die lebenslängliche Frau	Anne Voss	Margret Homeyer, Hannelore Hoger	Crime drama	
Lemminge	Michael Haneke	Paulus Manker, Bernhard Wicki, Elfriede Irrall, Monica Bleibtreu, Wolfgang Hübsch	Drama	Austrian-West German co-production
Lena Rais	Christian Rischert	Krista Stadler, Tilo Prückner, Kai Fischer	Drama	
Liebe, Tod und Heringshäppchen	Sven Severin	Curt Bois, Peter Pasetti, Monika Lundi, Hanne Wieder	Comedy	
Love Letters on Blue Paper	George Moorse	Hans Korte, Gustl Halenke, Robert Freitag	Drama	
Lucky Star	Hans-Jürgen Tögel	Katharina Böhm, Günther Maria Halmer, Hannelore Schroth, Joachim Hansen, Jacques Herlin	Family	
The Marriage of Maria Braun	Rainer Werner Fassbinder	Hanna Schygulla, Klaus Löwitsch, Ivan Desny, George Byrd	Drama	First in the BRD Trilogy
Mihail, câine de circ	Sergiu Nicolaescu	Karl Michael Vogler	Adventure	a.k.a. Michael, Brother of Jerry. Romanian-West German co-production
Milo Milo	Nikos Perakis	Veruschka von Lehndorff, Mario Adorf, Andréa Ferréol, Andreas Katsulas, Julien Guiomar, Antonio Fargas, Joe Higgins	Comedy	West German-Greek co-production
Missile X – Geheimauftrag Neutronenbombe	Leslie H. Martinson	Peter Graves, Curd Jürgens, John Carradine, Karin Schubert	Spy thriller	a.k.a. Missile X: The Neutron Bomb Incident a.k.a. The Tehran Incident. American-Italian-Spanish-West German-Iranian co-production
Monarch	Manfred Stelzer, Johannes Flütsch	Diethard Wendtland	Documentary	
Moral	Kurt Wilhelm	Maria Schell, Toni Berger, Barbara Schöne	Comedy	
Mr. Szmil's Chairs	Vojtěch Jasný	Rudolf Wessely, Wolfgang Kieling	Comedy	a.k.a. Die Stühle des Herrn Szmil
Die Münze	Werner Schlechte	Gustl Bayrhammer	Crime comedy	a.k.a. The Mint
The Murderer	Ottokar Runze	Gerhard Olschewski	Crime drama	
Die Nacht, in der der Chef geschlachtet wurde	Vojtěch Jasný	Heinz Schubert, Gert Haucke, Rudolf Wessely	Comedy, Fantasy	
Nathan the Wise	Oswald Döpke	Werner Hinz, Katerina Jacob, Peter Fricke, Sigfrit Steiner, Siegfried Wischnewski, Judy Winter	Drama	
Neon Shadow	Marco Serafini	Kristina van Eyck, Rainer Will, Christoph Eichhorn	Drama	a.k.a. Neonschatten
Nero	Wolfgang Reichmann, Werner Schlechte, Gerd Krauss	Wolfgang Reichmann, Günter Mack, Lola Müthel	Drama	
Das Nest	Gedeon Kovács	Franz Xaver Kroetz, Lisa Fitz	Drama	
The Night with Chandler	Hans Noever	Rio Reiser, Agnes Dünneisen, Thomas Schücke	Crime	
Nosferatu the Vampyre	Werner Herzog	Klaus Kinski, Isabelle Adjani, Bruno Ganz, Roland Topor	Horror	West German-French co-production
Notenkonferenz	Karl Heinz Deickert	Hartmut Becker, Renate Küster	Drama	
Old-Fashioned Comedy	Franz Josef Wild	Agnes Fink, Arno Assmann	Drama	a.k.a. Altmodische Komödie
Olympia	Ludwig Cremer	Christiane Hörbiger, Klaus Maria Brandauer	Comedy	
The Patriotic Woman	Alexander Kluge	Hannelore Hoger	Drama	a.k.a. The Female Patriot a.k.a. The Patriot
Phantasten	Peter Beauvais	Manfred Krug, Michael Degen, Günter Strack, Sabine Sinjen	Drama	
Protokoll eines Verdachts	Daniel Christoff	Martin Lüttge, Claudia Butenuth, Rolf Becker	Drama	
Putting Things Straight	Georg Brintrup	Gisela Stein, Hanns Zischler	Biography	a.k.a. Ich räume auf
Die Quelle	Rainer Erler	Herbert Herrmann, Werner Kreindl, Siegfried Wischnewski	Thriller	a.k.a. The Source
Radieschen	Rolf Busch	Hansi Jochmann, Susanne Schaefer, Manfred Lehmann	Drama	
Radio On	Chris Petit	David Beames, Lisa Kreuzer, Sandy Ratcliff, Sue Jones-Davies, Sting	Drama	British-West German co-production
Revolution in Frankfurt	Fritz Umgelter	Günter Strack, Richard Münch	History	
Rollentausch	Peter Weck	Günther Maria Halmer, Claudia Rieschel, Evelyn Opela, Peer Augustinski	Drama	
Der Ruepp	Kurt Wilhelm	Karl Obermayr, Gertrud Kückelmann	Drama	
Schluchtenflitzer	Rüdiger Nüchtern	Hans Kollmannsberger, Hans Brenner, Ruth Drexel	Drama	
Der Schuft, der den Münchhausen schrieb	Rudolf Nussgruber	Lutz Hochstraate, Ferdy Mayne	Biography	
She's 19 and Ready	Franz Josef Gottlieb	Sabine Wollin, Ekkehardt Belle, Claus Obalski	Sex comedy	
Sisters, or the Balance of Happiness	Margarethe von Trotta	Jutta Lampe, Gudrun Gabriel, Jessica Früh, Heinz Bennent, Konstantin Wecker, Agnes Fink	Drama	
Some Kind of Saint	Klaus Lemke	Cleo Kretschmer, Wolfgang Fierek	Comedy	
Song of the Grasshopper	Thomas Engel	Harald Leipnitz, Xenia Pörtner	Comedy	a.k.a. Grille und Ameise
Die Sonnenschein GmbH	Heinz Schirk	Herbert Herrmann	Crime comedy	
Spätsommertage	Erich Neureuther	Lisa Helwig, Rose Renée Roth, Eva Lissa, Erik Frey, Karl-Maria Schley	Comedy	
The Story of an Unknown Man	Peter Vogel	Günther Maria Halmer, Gila von Weitershausen	Drama	a.k.a. The Story of a Nobody a.k.a. An Anonymous Story
Strafe ohne Urteil	Eberhard Itzenplitz	Heidrun Polack	Crime drama	
A Sunday in October	András Kovács	Klaus Maria Brandauer, Ferenc Bács, Marianna Moór, Lajos Őze, Martin Lüttge	War	Hungarian-West German co-production
Tales from the Vienna Woods	Maximilian Schell	Birgit Doll, Hanno Pöschl, Helmut Qualtinger, Eric Pohlmann, André Heller, Lil Dagover	Drama	Austrian-West German co-production
Tally Brown, New York	Rosa von Praunheim	Tally Brown	Documentary, Music	
Das tausendunderste Jahr	Eberhard Itzenplitz	Alexander Gittinger, Harald Dewald, Cornelia Meinhardt, Regine Vergeen, Rainer Basedow	War	a.k.a. Das 1001. Jahr
The Tell-Tale Heart	Karl Heinz Kramberg	Hans Clarin, Ferdy Mayne	Horror	
The Third Generation	Rainer Werner Fassbinder	Eddie Constantine, Hanna Schygulla, Volker Spengler, Margit Carstensen, Hark Bohm, Günther Kaufmann, Bulle Ogier, Udo Kier, Y Sa Lo	Black comedy	
Ticket of No Return	Ulrike Ottinger	Tabea Blumenschein, Christine Lutze, Magdalena Montezuma	Drama	a.k.a. Bildnis einer Trinkerin
Tilt	Renke Korn	Lutz Reichert, Jan Fedder, Till Topf, Benjamin Völz	Crime drama	
The Tin Drum	Volker Schlöndorff	David Bennent, Charles Aznavour, Mario Adorf, Angela Winkler, Daniel Olbrychski, Katharina Thalbach	Drama, War	West German-French co-production. Based on the book by Günter Grass
Tödlicher Ausgang	Stanislav Barabáš	Rolf Becker, Günter Lamprecht, Gila von Weitershausen, Karin Anselm, Richard Münch, Paul Dahlke	Thriller	a.k.a. Nur über Meiners Leiche
Der Tote bin ich	Alexander von Eschwege	Marius Müller-Westernhagen, Anne Bennent	Mystery	
Trennung – Die Geschichte der Anna Wildermuth	Peter Beauvais	Sabine Sinjen, Peter Seum, Pierre Franckh	Drama	
Die Überführung	Kurt Wilhelm	Toni Berger, Karl Obermayr	Drama	
Unabhängig und nur dem Gesetz unterworfen	Eberhard Itzenplitz	Hartmut Reck	Drama	
Union der festen Hand	Claus Peter Witt	Dieter Laser, Eva Mattes, Hannes Messemer, Edith Schultze-Westrum	Drama	
Uns reicht das nicht	Jürgen Flimm	Herbert Grönemeyer, Uwe Ochsenknecht, Anna Henkel, Marita Breuer	Drama	
Vater, mein Vater	Raimund Koplin	Friedrich-Karl Praetorius, Jessica Früh	Drama	a.k.a. Vater mein Vater oder Wunderbare Erfüllung eines Traums
Das verbotene Spiel	George Moorse	Dieter Schidor, Rudolf Schündler, Y Sa Lo, Robinson Reichel	Science fiction	
Verführungen	Michael Verhoeven	Peter Striebeck, Wolfgang Bahro, Sabrina Rentsch, Rosel Zech	Drama	
Victor	Walter Bockmayer, Rolf Bührmann	Peter Kaghanovitch, Eddie Constantine, Barbara Valentin, Udo Kier	Musical, Drama	
Victoria	Bo Widerberg	Michaela Jolin, Stephan Schwartz, Hans Christian Blech, Christiane Hörbiger	Drama	Swedish-West German co-production
Vor Sonnenaufgang	Oswald Döpke	Ernst Jacobi, Ulrike Bliefert, Gerd Böckmann, Franciszek Pieczka	Drama	a.k.a. Before Sunrise a.k.a. Before Daybreak a.k.a. Before Dawn
Wahnsinn, das ganze Leben ist Wahnsinn	Petra Haffter	Germaine Radinger	Drama	
Ways in the Night	Krzysztof Zanussi	Mathieu Carrière, Maja Komorowska, Horst Frank	War, Drama	
Wencke, Udo und der blaue Diamant	Michael Pfleghar	Wenche Myhre, Udo Jürgens, Jean-Pierre Cassel, Peer Augustinski, Michaela May	Musical comedy	
The White Horse Inn	Eberhard Hauff	Helmuth Lohner, Margot Werner, Regine Lamster, Petra Maria Grühn, Claus Eberth, Henning Schlüter, Willy Semmelrogge, Erik Frey	Musical	
Who Invented the Yoyo? Who Invented the Moon Buggy?	Kidlat Tahimik	Kidlat Tahimik, Kidlat de Guia	Comedy	a.k.a. Sinong Lumikha ng Yoyo? Sinong Lumikha ng Moon Buggy. Filipino-West German co-production
Wie Rauch und Staub	Wolfgang Schleif	Herlinde Latzko, Horst Frank, Edith Schultze-Westrum, Günter Meisner	Drama	
The Willi Busch Report	Niklaus Schilling	Tilo Prückner, Kornelia Boje	Comedy	Entered into the 1980 Cannes Film Festival
Willi und die Kameraden	Helmut Kopetzky	Thomas Vahl, Heinz Hoenig, Arnfried Lerche	Drama	a.k.a. Willi and His Comrades
Die Wohltäter	Jo Roszak	Werner Kreindl	Drama	
Womanlight	Costa-Gavras	Yves Montand, Romy Schneider, Lila Kedrova, Heinz Bennent	Drama	a.k.a. Clair de femme. French-Italian-West German co-production
Woyzeck	Werner Herzog	Klaus Kinski, Eva Mattes, Josef Bierbichler, Wolfgang Reichmann, Willy Semmelrogge	Classic literature	Based on the story by Georg Büchner
Wunder einer Nacht	Konrad Sabrautzky	Arno Assmann, Ulrike Bliefert, Brigitte Horney, Josef Meinrad, Heidemarie Hatheyer, Barbara Rütting, Karin Baal	Family, Music	West German-Austrian co-production
Zuhaus unter Fremden	Peter Keglevic	Herbert Grönemeyer, Aysun Bademsoy	Drama	
Zwei Tore hat der Hof	Volker Vogeler	Rüdiger Kirschstein, Marlies Engel	Drama	a.k.a. 2 Tore hat der Hof

== Notes ==
=== References ===
- Browning, John Edgar; Picart, Caroline Joan (2010). Dracula in Visual Media:Film, Television, Comic Book and Electronic Game Appearances, 1921-2010. McFarland. ISBN 978-0786433650.
