= Angela Roy =

German actress (born 1957)

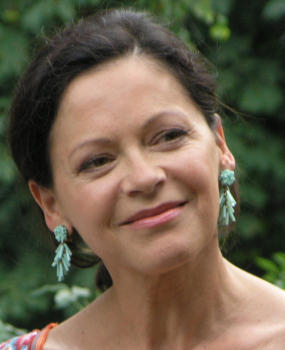
- Roy in 2006
- Born: Angela Giesen; 24 June 1957 (age 68); Hamburg, West Germany
- Occupations: Actress, director
- Years active: 1988–present

Angela Roy (born Angela Giesen; 24 June 1957) is a German actress and director.

== Life and career ==
Angela Roy was born into a family of artistes. Her parents were acrobats who with a third partner made up the Iris Roy Trio. Up to the age of eleven she was constantly travelling. She learnt various European languages and she now speaks English, French, Italian and Spanish today.

Roy graduated from high school in Hamburg and then she studied ballet, singing and choreography. She graduated from the Royal Academy of Dramatic Art in London. She also has a degree as a certified translator for English / German. She was a choreographer for Pia Zadora.

Roy worked in London theatres and then at the Bavarian State Theatre, the Münchner Volkstheater and at the Hamburger Kammerspiele. In 1998, she and her partner Erich Hallhuber created the play Play it again Brecht at Munich Cuvilliés Theatre. This was their first joint directorial work. Her television career began with roles in the series Zwei Brüder and Aus heiterem Himmel. In 2004 she won the German Television Awards, Television Movie Cold Spring by Dominik Graf. From November 2006 to October 2007 she starred in the telenovela Rote Rosen as Petra Jansen.

She has a daughter and lives in her hometown of Hamburg (Rotherbaum district) since 2002. She is a member of the German Film Academy and the German Association of film and television actors.

== Filmography ==
=== Television ===
- 1989: Drei Damen vom Grill – 7 episodes (Klavierlehrerin)
- 1992: Unser Lehrer Doktor Specht
- 1992: Regina auf den Stufen – 1 episode
- 1993: Liebe ist Privatsache – 15 episodes
- 1994–2000: Zwei Brüder (Serie)
- 1996: Aus heiterem Himmel – 5 episodes
- 2001: Das Traumschiff – Jubiläums-Special
- 2001: Der letzte Zeuge – Die Entführung
- 2001: Wilsberg und die Tote im Feld
- 2002: Doppelter Einsatz
- 2002: Tatort – Schatten
- 2003: Tatort – Leyla
- 2003–2005: Mit Herz und Handschellen (TV series)
- 2003: Rosamunde Pilcher – Flamme der Liebe
- 2004: Cold Spring
- 2004: Der Ferienarzt ... auf Korfu
- 2004: Rose unter Dornen (TV film)
- 2004: SK Kölsch – Der letzte der Hippies
- 2004: Room Service
- 2005: Girlfriends – Süßes und Saures
- 2005: Großstadtrevier – Rampensau
- 2005: SOKO Kitzbühel - Mord im Schloss
- 2005: Bis in die Spitzen – 3 episodes
- 2006: Die Rosenheim-Cops - Diebstahl als Alibi
- 2006: Ein Fall für zwei – Blutige Liebesgrüße
- 2006: Der Kriminalist – Mördergroupie
- 2006: Tatort - Liebe am Nachmittag
- 2006–2007: Rote Rosen
- 2007: Ein unverbesserlicher Dickkopf
- 2007: Reife Leistung!
- 2008: Geld.Macht.Liebe – episodes 1–12
- 2008: Das Traumschiff – Papua Neuguinea
- 2009: Geld.Macht.Liebe – episodes 13–19
- 2010: SOKO Wismar – Eine kleine Sehnsucht
- 2010: Wilde Wellen
- 2010: The Gold Quest: A Journey to Panama
- 2011: Das Traumhotel – Malediven
- 2011: In aller Freundschaft – Gratwanderung
- 2011: Weihnachten ... ohne mich, mein Schatz!
- 2012: Rosamunde Pilcher – Das Geheimnis der weißen Taube
- 2012: Inga Lindström: Die Sache mit der Liebe
- 2013: Alles Chefsache! (als Carla Monterosso)
- 2013: Um Himmels Willen
- 2013: Harry nervt
- 2014: In aller Freundschaft - Gebrochene Herzen
- 2015: Das Traumschiff - Kanada
- 2015: Rosamunde Pilcher – Ghostwriter

=== Film ===
- 1991: L’Ange déchu
- 1996: Forever and Ever (directed by Hark Bohm)
- 2000: Rillenfieber (directed by Patrick Tauss)
- 2004: Die Unsichtbare (Kurzfilm)
- 2004: Maria an Callas
- 2005: Carrick Mor (Kurzfilm)

== Theater ==
- Stadttheater Pforzheim
- Festspiele Heppenheim
- Van Brough Theatre, London
- Theater des Westens, Berlin
- Komödie am Kurfürstendamm, Berlin
- Münchner Lach- und Schießgesellschaft
- Münchner Volkstheater
- Bayerisches Staatsschauspiel, München
- Hamburger Kammerspiele

=== Theater-Programme ===
- 1997–2002: Ragout Fin de Siècle – Ein Erich-Kästner-Abend für Erwachsene
- 2000: Wenn ich mich in Deine Stimme hülle – Ein Lotte Lenya / Kurt Weill Abend
- 2001: Ich gehöre nur mir ganz allein – Ein Marlene Dietrich Abend
- 2009: Barfuß im Regen – Theater an der Kö
- 2012: Die Harry Belafonte Story – Theatertournee
