= Die Brücke (disambiguation) =

Die Brücke (English: The Bridge) may refer to:

- Die Brücke, a group of expressionist German artists formed in Dresden in 1905
- Die Brücke (institute), a research institute founded in Munich in 1911
- Die Brücke (novel), a 1958 anti-war novel written by Manfred Gregor
- Die Brücke (film), a 1959 West-German film directed by Bernhard Wicki, based on the novel
