= Wepper =

Wepper is a surname. Notable people with the surname include:

- Elmar Wepper (1944-2023), German actor
- Fritz Wepper (1941-2024), German television actor
- Sophie Wepper (born 1981), German actress, daughter of Fritz Wepper
