= Janina Hartwig =

German actress (born 1961)

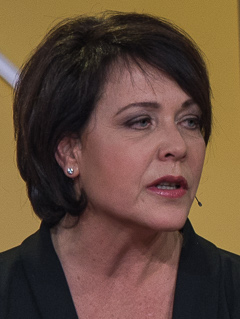
- Hartwig in 2017
- Born: 8 June 1961 (age 64); East Berlin, East Germany
- Occupation: Actress

Janina Hartwig (German pronunciation: [jaˈniːna ˈhaʁtvɪç]; born 8 June 1961) is a German actress.

== Biography ==
Janina Hartwig was born on 8 June 1961, in East Berlin, and began acting as a child. She studied acting at the Ernst Busch Academy of Dramatic Arts in Berlin-Schöneweide.

In 1978, she was discovered for the made-for-TV film "Disko mit Einlage", where she had her first starring role. After German reunification Hartwig, unlike other actors from the former GDR, was able to continue her career - especially in television. From 1998 to 2001, she acted in 52 episodes of the television series Bei aller Liebe as Dr. Sarah Borkmann. Since 2006, she has starred as Sister Hanna in the series Um Himmels Willen, for which she won the Goldene Henne for acting together with colleague Fritz Wepper, as well as a Bambi (also with Fritz Wepper).

Janina Hartwig lives in Munich. She is divorced and has two children.
