= Literaturhaus München =

German cultural institution

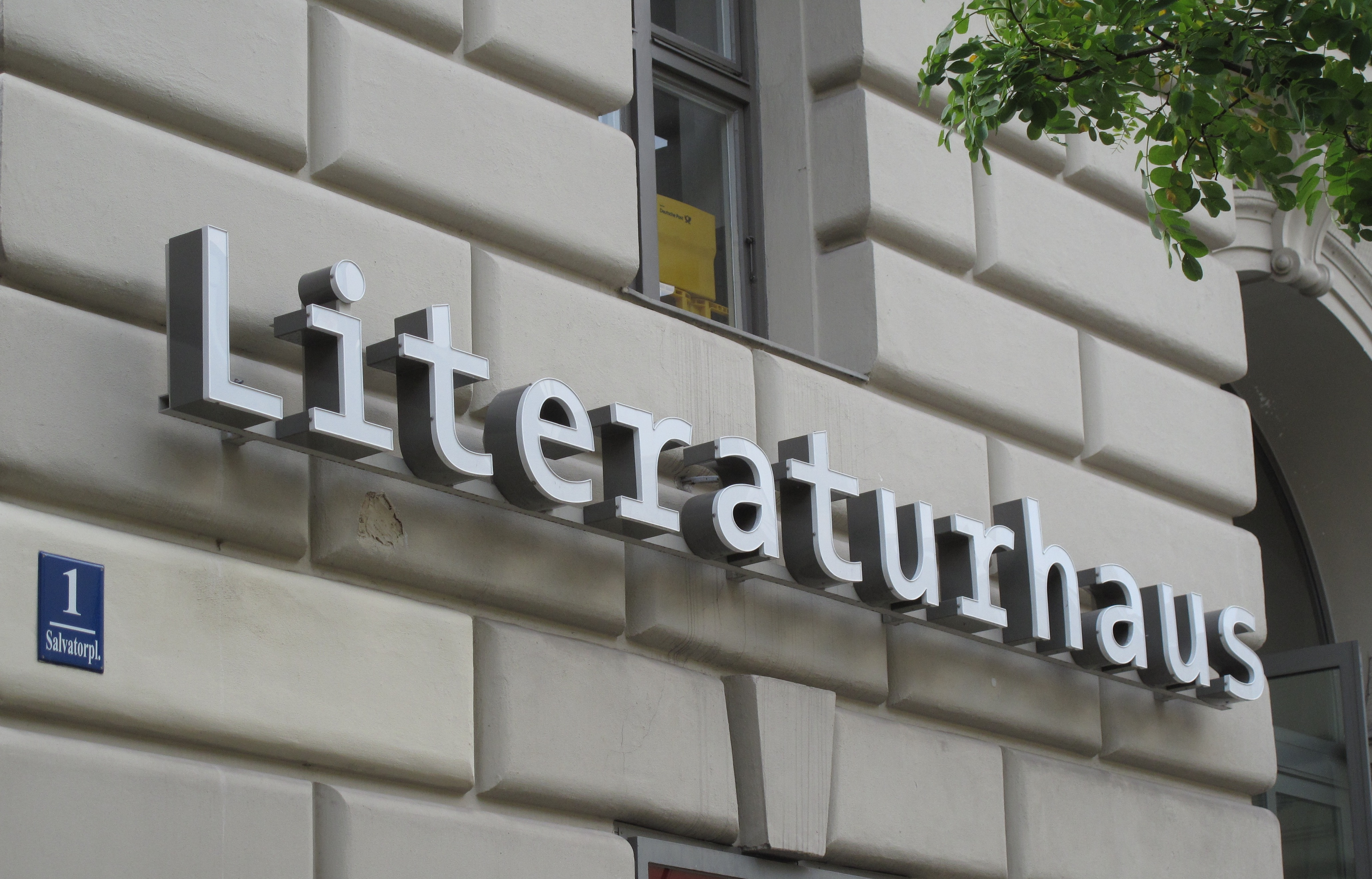
Literaturhaus München

The Literaturhaus München is a cultural institution in the center of Munich, dedicated to the teaching of literature and the organization of literary events.

== History of the building ==
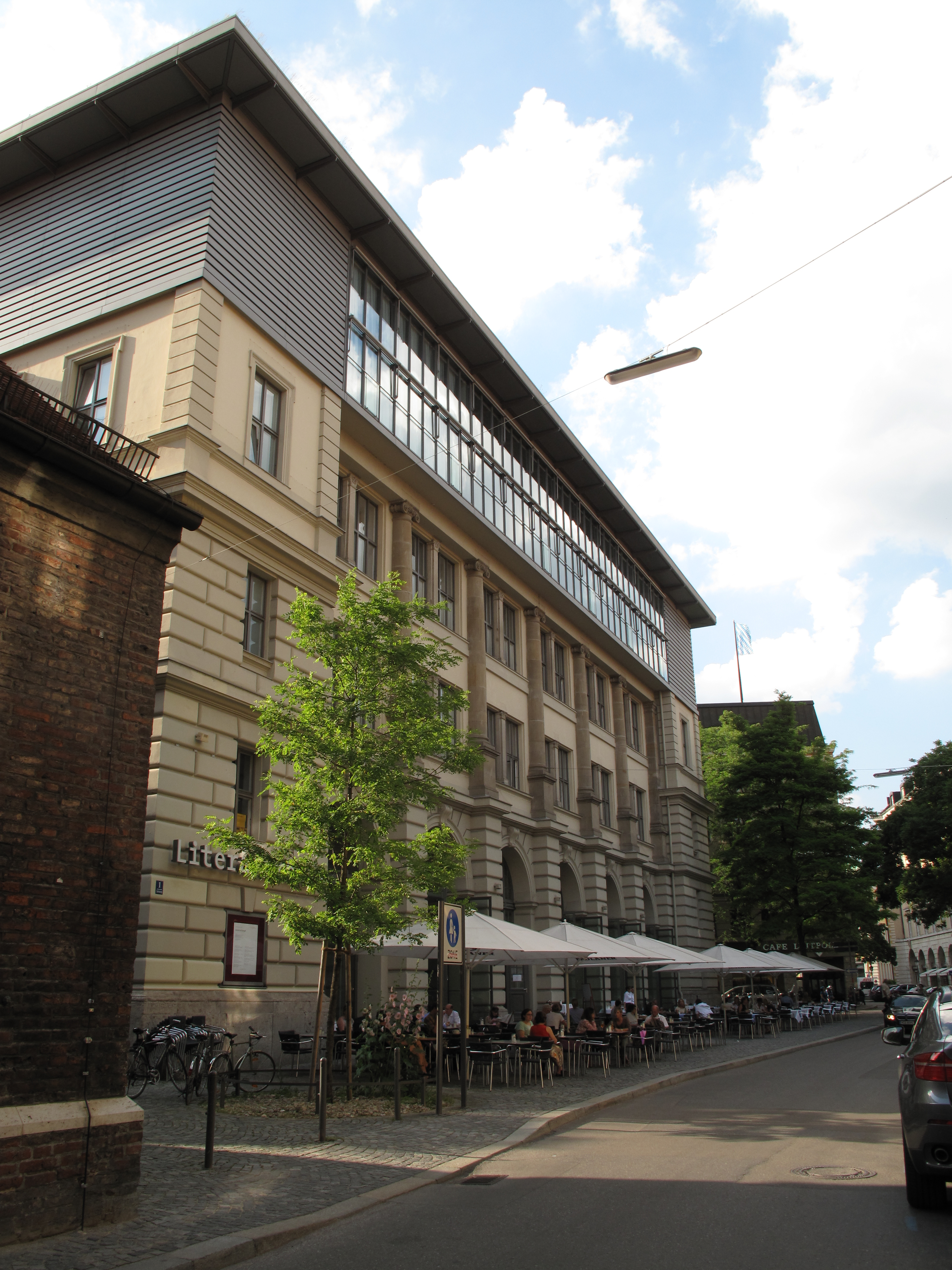
Literaturhaus München at Salvatorplatz

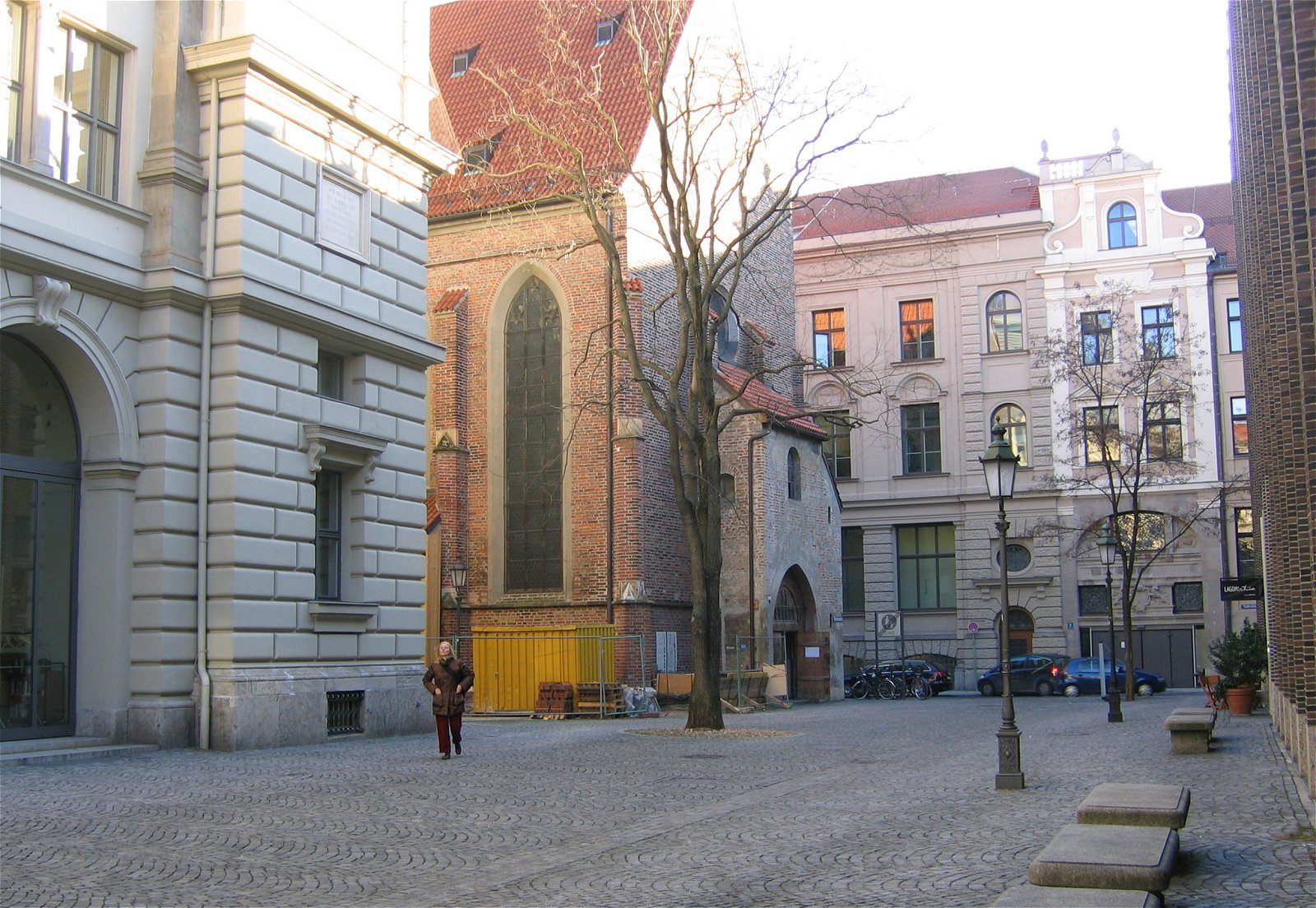
Salvatorplatz with Literaturhaus (front left) and Salvatorkirche (rear left)

The Salvatorkirche is located at the Salvatorplatz. The cemetery surrounding the church was converted into the market square in the 18th century. Through the decision of the Munich magistrate, a school was built there, the market lost its place and was integrated into the ground floor of the new building. The market operation was stopped in 1906 and the building was completely converted to the school.

In 1993, the Munich City Council decided to use the buildings, which were largely in need of refurbishment, to be used as a literary house. For this purpose, the state capital of Munich, together with Munich publishers, founded the Stiftung Buch-, Medien- und Literaturhaus München. In 1995, the renovation and reconstruction of the building and the entire Salvatorplatz started. In addition to various event facilities, a library was also created in the building. In June 1997, the Literaturhaus München was opened. Since 2002, the fictional office of the "Mutter Oberin" of the ARD TV series Um Himmels Willen is located on the third floor.

== Management ==
From 1996 until the end of June 2016, the literary scientist Reinhard G. Wittmann was the director of the Literaturhaus in Munich. He was replaced on 1 July 2016, by the publisher and lecturer Tanja Graf.

== Tasks ==
- Meeting place for writers, publishers, booksellers and journalists
- Training for the employees in the bookkeeping sector
- Electronic documentation pool for present literature
- Forum for all writers and readers

== Bavarian Academy of Writing ==
The Bavarian Academy of Writing offers active, up-to-date literature advice for young authors. Along with this, the Literaturhaus organizes seminars for students of various Bavarian universities, namely the University of Bamberg, the University of Bayreuth, the University of Erlangen–Nuremberg, LMU Munich, the Technical University of Munich, and the University of Regensburg. These universities have teamed up with the Literaturhaus to annually provide two parallel courses for students, supported by the Bavarian State Ministry of Science, Research and the Arts. Seminars for young authors (up to the age of 40) are also offered in various literary genres.

== Literature House Lab ==
In addition to the public events, readings, discussions and exhibitions, the Literaturhaus München also offers training and programs for students and teachers. In close co-operation with teachers, typists courses for middle schools and grammar schools as well as project days and teacher trainings on literary centers or creative writing are also offered.

== Institutions in the Literaturhaus ==
- Akademie der Deutschen Medien
- Institut für Urheber- und Medienrecht
- Börsenverein des Deutschen Buchhandels - Landesverband Bayern

== Oskar Maria Graf Memorial ==
In the Brasserie OskarMaria is an art exhibition, created in 1997, by the American artist Jenny Holzer, which represents the writer Oskar Maria Graf. It consists of texts written by the author, which can be read on electronic writing boards, but also on furnishing articles, such as benches, tables and utensils.
