= Ruth Hausmeister =

German actress

- Born: 5 June 1912
- Died: 1 February 2012 (aged 99)
- Occupation: Actress

Ruth Hausmeister (5 June 1912 – 1 February 2012) was a German actress whose career, centered primarily in theater, spanned decades. She also had more than eighty credits in German film and television as well.

Her film credits included The Longest Day and Die Brücke. Her television credits included Der Kommissar and Stahlnetz, a detective series. Her last television role was in the 1990s ZDF television series, Zwei Brüder, in which she played the mother of actors Fritz Wepper and Elmar Wepper.

Hausmeister died on 1 February 2012 in Munich at the age of 99.

== Selected filmography ==
- Girls Behind Bars (1949) – Ilse Heidenreich, 'Heidin'
- Karriere in Paris (1952) – Gräfin Beauséant
- The Flying Classroom (1954) – Martins Mutter
- Rosemary (1958) – Frau Hartog
- The Man Who Sold Himself (1959) – Sekretärin von Sending
- The Bridge (1959) – Mrs. Mutz
- Tomorrow Is My Turn (1960) – Frau Keßler
- The Green Archer (1961) – (uncredited)
- The Longest Day (1962) – Frau Maria Rommel (uncredited)
- The Pedestrian (1973) – Inge Marie Giese
