= Town Without Pity =

1961 film by Gottfried Reinhardt

- Original German theatrical release poster
- Directed by: Gottfried Reinhardt
- Screenplay by: George Hurdalek; Jan Lustig; Silvia Reinhardt; Dalton Trumbo (uncredited)
- Based on: Das Urteil by Manfred Gregor
- Produced by: Eberhard Meichsner; Gottfried Reinhardt
- Starring: Kirk Douglas; Barbara Rütting; Christine Kaufmann; E. G. Marshall
- Cinematography: Kurt Hasse
- Edited by: Werner Preuss
- Music by: Dimitri Tiomkin
- Production company: Mirisch Company
- Distributed by: Gloria Film; United Artists
- Release dates: March 24, 1961 (West Germany); October 10, 1961 (United States)
- Running time: 105 minutes
- Countries: United States; Switzerland; West Germany
- Languages: English; German
- Box office: $1.2 million

Town Without Pity (German: Stadt ohne Mitleid) is a 1961 American/Swiss/West German international co-production drama film directed by Gottfried Reinhardt. Produced by The Mirisch Corporation, the film stars Kirk Douglas, Barbara Rütting, Christine Kaufmann, and E. G. Marshall.

The film was based on the 1960 novel Das Urteil (The Verdict) by German writer Gregor Dorfmeister, who wrote under the pen name Manfred Gregor. At Kirk Douglas' suggestion, the film was rewritten without credit by Dalton Trumbo.

== Plot ==
In occupied West Germany in 1960, four drunk American soldiers leave Florida Bar, where "Town Without Pity" is playing on the jukebox, and head to a river in the nearby countryside. Meanwhile, sixteen-year-old local Fräulein Karin Steinhof (Christine Kaufmann) has a quarrel with her 19-year-old boyfriend, Frank Borgmann (Gerhart Lippert), on the banks of the same river. She swims back to her starting point, lights up a cigarette and strips out of her wet bikini when she is confronted by Sergeant Chuck Snyder (Frank Sutton) and gang-raped by him, Corporal Birdwell Scott (Richard Jaeckel), Private Joey Haines (Mal Sondock), and Corporal Jim Larkin (Robert Blake). Borgmann hears her screams for help and swims across the river to help her, but he is knocked out by Snyder. After three of the men start to leave the scene, the guilt-ridden Larkin lingers behind; he covers Steinhof with his shirt before he finally flees with the other three men.

The men are quickly apprehended. To appease the anger and outrage of the Germans, Major General Stafford, the division commanding general, orders that their court martial be held in public in the local high school gymnasium. The prosecutor, Lieutenant Colonel Jerome Pakenham (E. G. Marshall), seeks the death penalty. Major Steve Garrett (Kirk Douglas) is assigned to defend the accused rapists. After interviewing his clients, Garrett tries to plea bargain for long sentences at hard labor, but Pakenham feels he has a strong case. Garrett starts investigating, questioning the residents. He is followed by Inge Koerner (Barbara Rütting), a hostile German reporter from what Garrett considers to be a scandal-seeking newspaper.

At the start of the trial, three of the men plead not guilty. Larkin tries to enter a plea of guilty but is overruled by Garrett. Garrett produces an army psychiatrist who had been treating Larkin before the incident. The witness testifies that Larkin is impotent for psychological reasons. Larkin violently denies it and has to be forcibly removed from the courtroom. After the first day, Garrett pleads with Karin's bank manager father, Karl Steinhof (Hans Nielsen), to withdraw her from the trial before it is too late, stating that he will have to break her down on the stand to save his clients. He advises Herr Steinhof to take his family and leave town, but Steinhof refuses.

As the lead defense counsel, Garrett has no choice but to show that Karin is not as innocent as she first appeared, nor is she well liked. He also destroys the credibility of Steinhof and Borgmann by catching them in pointless little lies. As Garrett continues his cross-examination of Karin, she eventually collapses under the strain. Her father withdraws her from the trial; this action ensures that the defendants cannot be executed. The four men are convicted of rape. Three are sentenced to long terms at hard labor, and Larkin is given a shorter sentence of six years. The damage has been done, however, and the townsfolk turn against Karin.

Though Frank Borgmann attacks him with a whip, Garrett tells him to take Karin and leave town forever. The young man takes his advice, but to raise money, he forges his mother's signature on a check. Determined to keep her son under her control, she sends the police after the couple. While Borgmann argues with the policemen, Karin runs away. Koerner, the reporter, later informs Garrett that Karin drowned herself in the river near where she had been violated. The last line of the title song is, "It isn't very pretty what a town without pity can do."

== Cast ==
- Kirk Douglas as Major Garrett
- Barbara Rütting as Inge Koerner
- Christine Kaufmann as Karin Steinhof
- E. G. Marshall as Lieutenant Colonel Pakenham
- Hans Nielsen as Karl Steinhof
- Ingrid van Bergen as Trude, a prostitute who provides Garrett with information
- Robert Blake as Corporal Jim Larkin
- Richard Jaeckel as Corporal Birdwell Scott
- Frank Sutton as Staff Sergeant Chuck Snyder
- Mal Sondock as Private Joey Haines
- Karin Hardt as Frau Steinhof, Karin's mother
- Gerhart Lippert as Frank Borgmann
- Alan Gifford as Major General Stafford
- Max Haufler as Doctor Urban, called to testify about Larkin
- Rose Renée Roth as Frau Kulig, a town gossip
- Eleonore von Hoogstraten as Frau Borgmann, Frank's mother
- Egon von Jordan as Bürgermeister
- Philo Hauser as Herr Schmidt

== Production ==
The film's score is by Dimitri Tiomkin. Tiomkin also wrote the music for the song "Town Without Pity", with lyrics by Ned Washington. It was performed by Gene Pitney. The song became an Academy Award nominee and Pitney's first top 40 single.

Filming took place in the towns of Bamberg and Forchheim in Bavaria, Germany, with some scenes shot at the Sievering Studios in the Austrian capital Vienna. The film's sets were designed by the art director Rolf Zehetbauer.

Kirk Douglas, who claimed that he broke the Hollywood blacklist by hiring Dalton Trumbo to write Spartacus, denied Trumbo's request for a credit on the film as he feared that his continued association with the communist screenwriter would hurt his career.

== See also ==
- List of American films of 1961
- Trial movies
