= Zwei Brüder =

- Created by: Felix Huby
- Starring: Elmar Wepper as Peter Thaler; Fritz Wepper as Christoph Thaler; Ruth Hausmeister as Marie Luise Thaler; Nina Petri as Elise Steininger; Angela Roy as Katja Thaler
- Country of origin: Germany

Production
- Running time: 90 minutes

Original release
- Network: ZDF
- Release: 17 December 1994 – 19 May 2001

Zwei Brüder (Two Brothers) is a German detective television series based on an idea by Felix Huby, who also wrote several screenplays. Eleven directors produced 17 episodes of 85-90 minute length for ZDF between 1994 and 2000. The music for the series was by Frank Langer and Wilbert Hirsch.

== Plot ==
The two brothers, Christoph (Fritz Wepper) and Peter Thaler (Elmar Wepper) could not be more different: the elder Christoph is married and a successful attorney. The younger Peter has given up his studies and is considered by police as a ruthless detective. Both live in the house of the mother (Ruth Hausmeister) and so tensions are inevitable. Together, they go hunting criminals and solve difficult cases.

== Episodes ==
The episodes are as follows:

- 1. Zwei Brüder
- 2. Die lange Nacht
- 3. Die Quirini-Affäre
- 4. Der Gassenmörder
- 5. In eigener Sache
- 6. Die Tochter
- 7. Nervenkrieg
- 8. Einzelgänger
- 9. Kaltes Herz
- 10. Tödliche Träume
- 11. Verschleppt
- 12. Gift
- 13. Herztod
- 14. Mörderische Rache
- 15. Tod im See
- 16. Farbe der Nacht
- 17. Abschied

== Cast ==
- Klaus J. Behrendt
- Suzanne von Borsody
- Jacques Breuer
- Anne-Sophie Briest
- Sky du Mont
- Alexander Duda
- Anton Feichtner
- Peter Fricke
- Dirk Galuba
- Gerald A. Held
- Jörg Hube
- Michael König
- Oliver Korittke
- Henry van Lyck
- Axel Milberg
- Franka Potente
- Ralf Richter
- Barbara Rudnik
- Dietmar Schönherr
- Ellen Schwiers
- Philipp Sonntag
- Dietz-Werner Steck
- Oliver Stritzel
- Friedrich von Thun
- Max Tidof
- Christian Tramitz
- Karl-Heinz Vosgerau
- Klaus Wennemann
- Rolf Zacher

== See also ==
- List of German television series
