= Gregor Dorfmeister =

German writer

Gregor Dorfmeister (7 March 1929, Albstadt – 4 February 2018) was a German journalist and writer. Under the pseudonym Manfred Gregor, Dorfmeister published three novels.

His debut novel, Die Brücke ("The Bridge"), was turned into a Golden Globe Award-winning film of the same name. The second, Das Urteil (The Verdict), is best known in the United States where it was made into the movie Town Without Pity starring Kirk Douglas and featuring an Academy Award-nominated song of the same name performed by Gene Pitney.

== Life ==
Born in Tailfingen, today part of Albstadt, Gregor Dorfmeister grew up in Bad Tölz, where he attended high school. In the spring of 1945 at age 16, he was a member of the Volkssturm in his home region and participated in defending two bridges against advancing American tanks. Seeing one of the tank-crew members wounded was "terrible. ... That's when I became a pacifist". Seven of eight of his young fellow German fighters were also killed in the day's battles before the town fell. In 1946, he finished high school and then worked for a construction company and in the wood processing industry. From 1948, he studied drama, journalism and philosophy at the Ludwig-Maximilians-Universität München. During this period he completed an internship at a Munich newspaper. From 1954 he was Außenredakteur of the newspaper Munich Merkur in Tegernsee, from 1957 in Miesbach and 1960 in Bad Tölz. From 1962, he headed the local paper Tölzer Courier.

Dorfmeister, who in addition to his journalistic work has been committed to the support for disabled people, lived in retirement in Bad Tölz. In 1981, he was awarded the Order of Merit of the Federal Republic of Germany. He died in Bad Tölz in 2018.

Dorfmeister released three novels under the name Manfred Gregor:

- In his highly autobiographical first novel Die Brücke (1958), The Bridge, he describes the senseless Volkssturm use of a group of seven sixteen-year-olds at the end of the Second World War against the advancing Americans to defend a bridge. Six of the boys in the novel are killed, only one survives. The book was domestically in Germany, and internationally, a great success and the film of the same name by Bernhard Wicki (1959) is a classic anti-war film, Die Brücke. In 2007 ProSieben produced a television adaptation directed by Wolfgang Panzer with Franka Potente in the role of the teacher Elfie Bauer.
- Dorfmeister's second novel, Das Urteil (1960), The verdict, is about a rape case against a soldier of the American occupation troops in a southern German town. The book was made into a film by Gottfried Reinhardt called Town Without Pity. The movie included an Academy Award-nominated song of the same name with music by Dimitri Tiomkin, lyrics by Ned Washington and performed by Gene Pitney. The Pitney version was also featured in the 1988 John Waters movie Hairspray.
- In his third novel, Die Straße (1961), The Road or The Street, Dorfmeister describes a group of young people whose inner emptiness and aimlessness can lead to a slide into crime.

== Works ==
- Die Brücke. The Bridge. Novel. Desch, Munich 1958
  - Current paperback edition: Bertelsmann, Munich 2008, ISBN 978-3-570-30361-0
- Das Urteil. The Verdict. Novel. Desch, Munich 1960
- Die Straße. The Road or The Street. Novel. Desch, Munich 1961

== Additional sources ==
- Interview in German with Dorfmeister by Norbert Joa, One on One on Bayern Radio 2, 30.04.2013.
- Graham, David, Manfred Gregor's Die Brücke: an exercise in literary translation, (2000) Master of Arts thesis, Dublin City University, 2000. Abstract and download available.
