= Sophie Wepper =

German actress (born 1981)

- Born: Sophie-Margarita Wepper; 18 October 1981 (age 44); Munich, West Germany
- Occupation: Actress
- Years active: 2003–present
- Spouse: David Meister (m. 2016)
- Parent: Fritz Wepper (father)
- Relatives: Elmar Wepper (uncle)

Sophie Wepper (born Sophie-Margarita Wepper; 18 October 1981) is a German actress.

== Life and career ==
Born in Munich, (then West) Germany, Sophie-Margarita Wepper is the daughter of actor Fritz Wepper and Countess of Görtz, Angela von Morgen.

From 2002 to 2003 she studied television journalism at the Bavarian Academy of Television, followed by a one-year practical training at Lisa Film GmbH an Austrian-German film production company. Sophie Wepper gave her television debut in 1991 to her father's side in the TV-Series Derrick. Since 2003 she played supporting roles in the TV-Series In aller Freundschaft. She also works behind the camera and completed a rotating traineeship at the TV-Series Unter weißen Segeln episode Odyssee des Herzens, which originated in Greece with Fritz Wepper.

In the thriller series Mord in bester Gesellschaft, of the fifteen episodes have been created since 2007, she played again with her father her first major film role.

In the summer of 2013 Sophie Wepper played the role of Nsho-chi at the Karl May Festival in Bad Segeberg.

== Selected filmography ==
- 2003: In aller Freundschaft (TV-Series)
- 2004: Ein Engel namens Hans-Dieter (TV-movie)
- 2006: Kurhotel Alpenglück (TV-movie)
- 2007–2017: Mord in bester Gesellschaft (TV-Series)
- 2007: Rosamunde Pilcher: Wind über der See (TV-movie)
- 2008: Um Himmels Willen (TV-Series)
- 2010: Das Traumhotel (TV-Series)
- 2010: SOKO 5113 (TV-Series)
- 2010: SOKO Kitzbühel (TV-Series)
- 2012: Alarm für Cobra 11 (TV-Series)
- 2013: Um Himmels Willen (TV-Series)
- 2013: Weißblaue Geschichten

== Theater roles ==
- 2013: Nsho-chi at the Karl May Festival in Bad Segeberg
