= Volkssturm =

Nazi German militia from 1944 to 1945

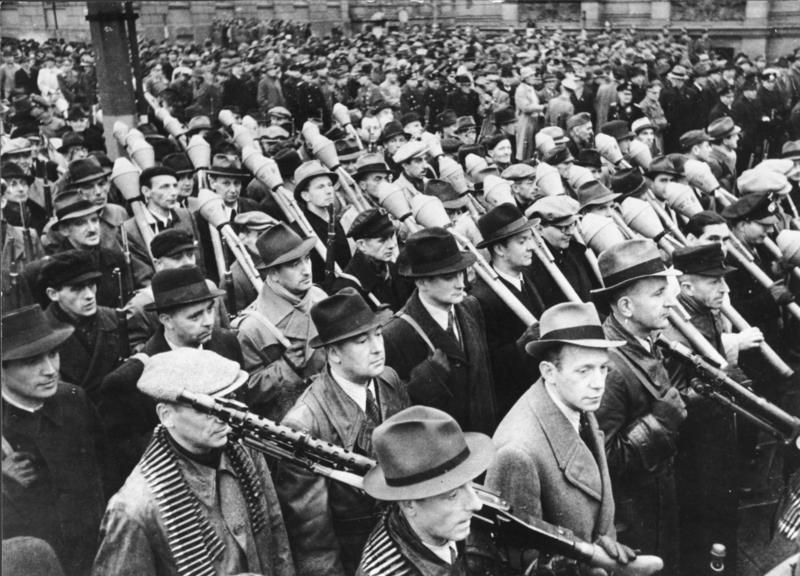
- Volkssturmmänner marching in Berlin, November 1944. Most of the men are carrying Panzerfaust launchers; the people at the bottom carry a MG34.
- Founded: 25 September 1944
- Disbanded: 8 May 1945
- Country: Germany
- Type: Militia
- Part of: Nazi Party
- Engagements: World War II
- Commander: Heinrich Himmler (military training and equipment); Martin Bormann (administration and indoctrination)

The Volkssturm (German pronunciation: [ˈfɔlksʃtʊʁm], lit. 'people's storm') was a levée en masse national militia established by Nazi Germany during the last months of World War II. It was set up by the Nazi Party on the orders of Adolf Hitler and established on 25 September 1944. It was staffed by conscripting males between the ages of 16 and 60 years who were not already serving in some military unit.

The Volkssturm comprised one of the final components of the total war promulgated by Propaganda Minister Joseph Goebbels, part of a Nazi endeavor to overcome their enemies' military strength through force of will. Volkssturm units fought unsuccessful battles against Allied forces at the end of the war. On several occasions, its members participated in atrocities, accompanied by German civilians and the Hitler Youth, which were overseen by members of the SS or Gau leaders.

== Origins and organisation ==
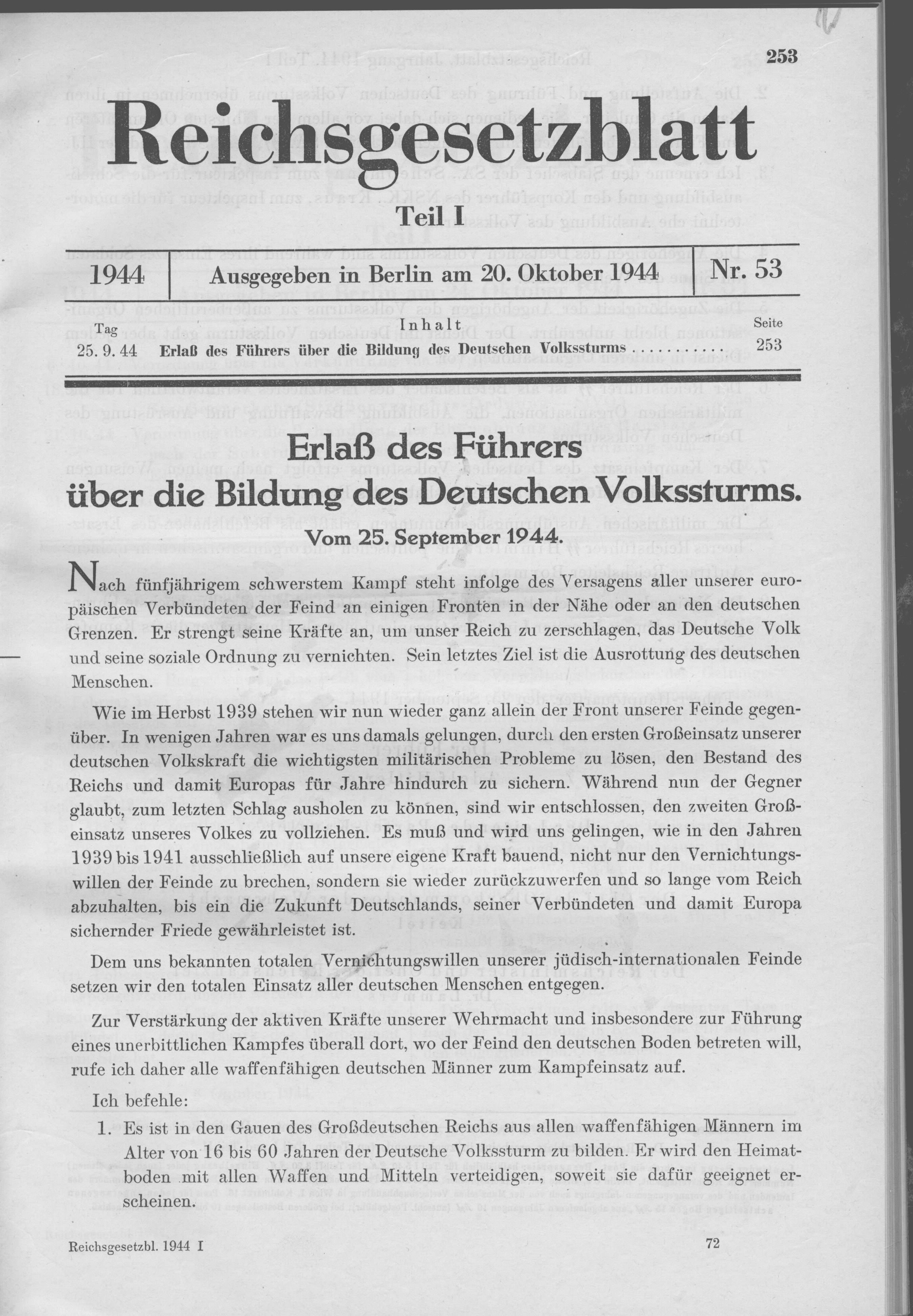
Publication of the decree on the formation of the Volkssturm, 20 October 1944, first page

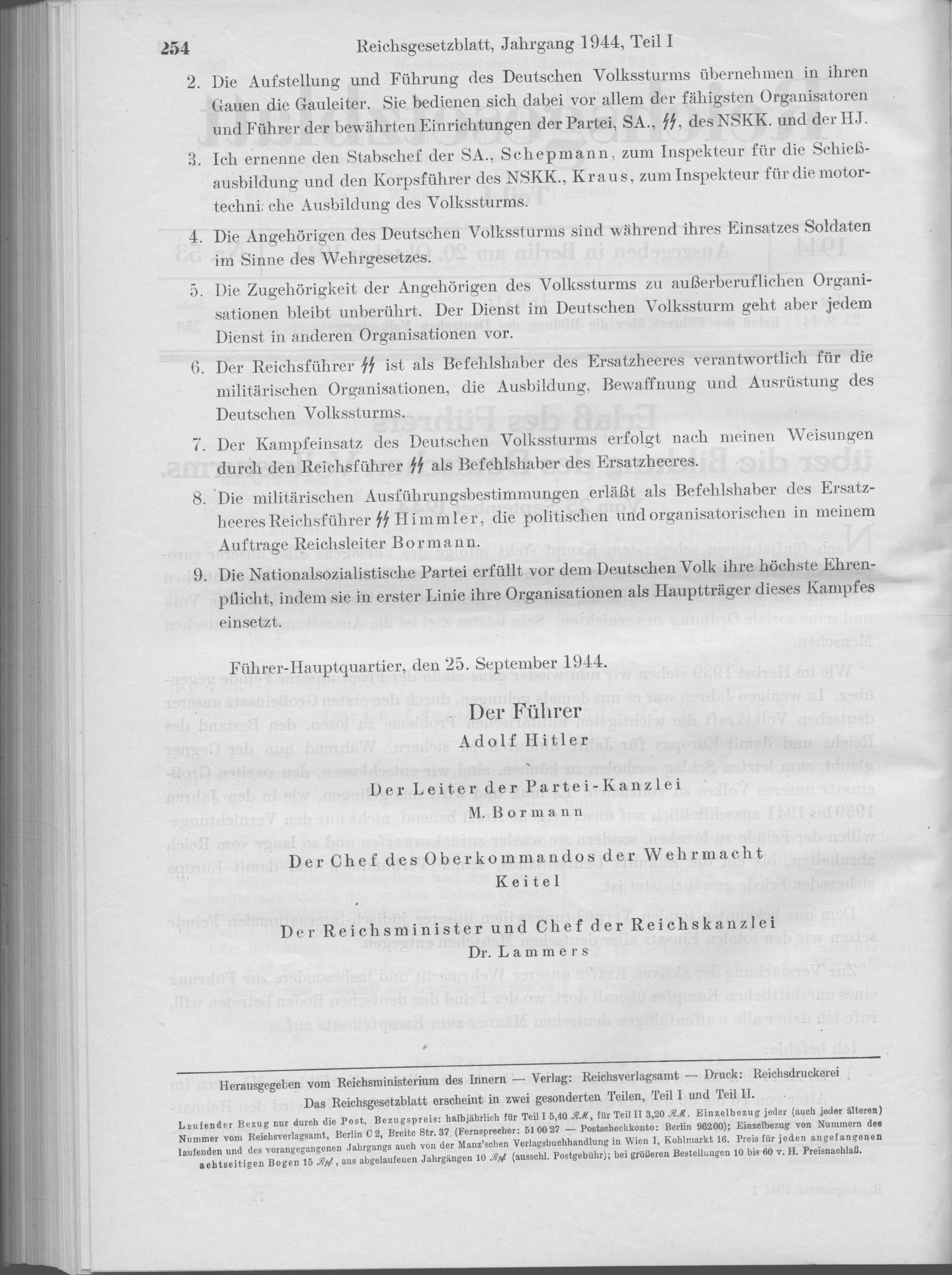
Second page of the publication of the decree on the formation of the Volkssturm, 20 October 1944

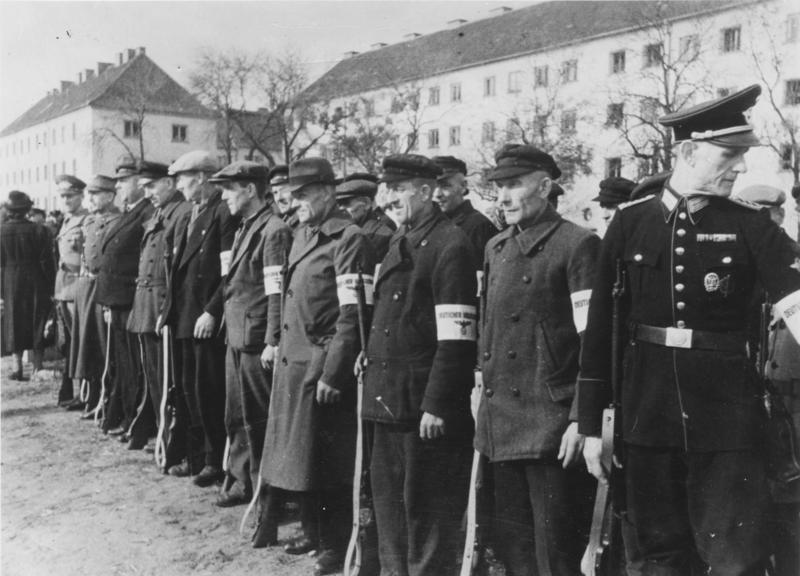
An SS Propaganda Company photograph of Volkssturm, 21 October 1944; only the men on the far left and far right end of the line appear to be uniformed members, with the far right being an Ordnungspolizei officer.

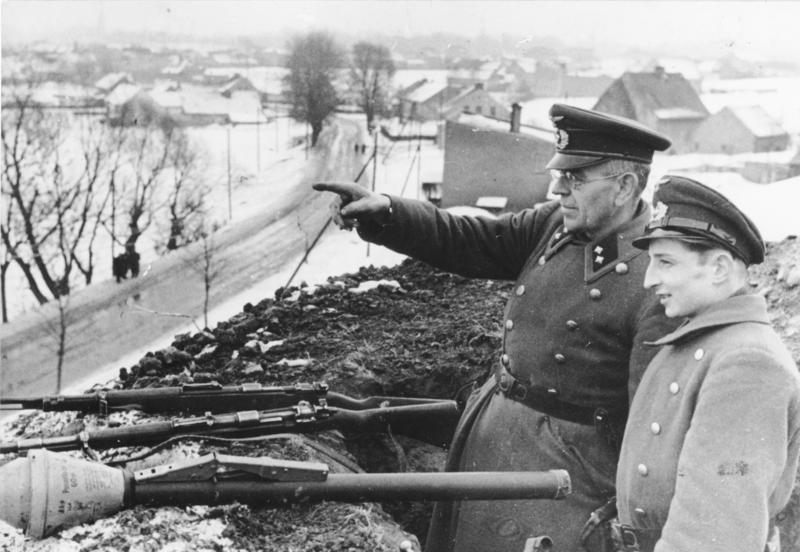
This photo depicts the disparity in age between the members, on the left a man of 50 or more with a boy of about 15 or 16.

The Volkssturm drew inspiration from the Prussian Landsturm of 1813–1815, that fought in the liberation wars against Napoleon, mainly as guerrilla forces. Plans to form a Landsturm national militia in eastern Germany as a last resort to boost fighting strength were first proposed in 1944 by General Heinz Guderian, chief of the German General Staff. The army did not have enough men to resist the Soviet advance. So, additional categories of men were called into service, including those in non-essential jobs, those previously deemed unfit, over-age, or under-age, and those recovering from wounds. The Volkssturm had existed, on paper, since around 1925, but it was only after Hitler ordered Martin Bormann to recruit six million men for this militia that the group became a physical reality. While the regime formally established the Volkssturm on 25 September, it was not announced to the public until 16 October 1944. The official launch date was two days later, 18 October 1944 and was chosen by Heinrich Himmler to evoke parallels with the popular uprising which, according to popular legend, ended French rule over Germany and culminated in the Battle of Leipzig on the same date in 1813. Despite the appeal for this last-ditch effort, the intended strength of "six million" members was never attained.

Joseph Goebbels and other propagandists depicted the Volkssturm as an outburst of enthusiasm and the will to resist. Historian Daniel Blatman writes that the Volkssturm was portrayed as the "incarnation" of the greater Volksgemeinschaft, whereby "all differences in social status, origin, or age vanish and unite all people on the basis of race. It was the service framework for members of the local community, who had been raised together and lived side by side, and now bore arms together in order to defend the community." The militia was meant to embody Nazi racial community ideals, uniting men across classes for National Socialist ends.

However, many Germans greeted the Volkssturm with resignation or resentment. Few were enthusiastic, and many feared its members would be treated as an illegal guerrilla force with the consequences that represented. To this end, there was a widespread justifiable concern among Germans that the Allies—especially the Soviets—would treat Volkssturm fighters as illegal combatants, leading to the summary execution of participating members. Correspondingly, Germany sought legal assurance from the Allies that Volkssturm members would be treated as lawful combatants. Britain and the U.S. granted recognition contingent on compliance with Hague rules. (Note: The use of armbands, paybooks, and the Nazi attempt to equip the Volkssturm with uniforms reflected their efforts to meet the mandates outlined by the Hague Convention.)

In some regards, the Volkssturm was the culmination of Goebbels' "total war" speech of February 1943 and its formation was "given a big build-up" in the November 1944 newsreel episode of Die Deutsche Wochenschau. Consistent messages of final victory from various Nazi media outlets accompanying the Volkssturm's creation provided a psychological rallying point for the civilian population. While it had some marginal effect on morale, it was undermined by the recruits' visible lack of uniforms and weaponry. Nazi themes of death, transcendence, and commemoration were given full play to encourage the fight. Many German civilians realised that this was a desperate attempt to turn the course of the war. Sardonic old men would remark, "We old monkeys are the Führer's newest weapon" (in German this rhymes: "Wir alten Affen sind des Führers neue Waffen"). A popular joke about the Volkssturm went "Why is the Volkssturm Germany's most precious resource? Because its members have silver in their hair, gold in their mouths, and lead in their bones."

Whether it was indicative of desperation or not (as the sardonic German jokes suggest), the creation of the Volkssturm was part of a Nazi strategy—characterized in modern terminology as “defense-in-depth”—to fortify all German towns into defensive nodes, so as to forestall and delay the Allied entry into the greater Reich. For these militia units to be effective, they needed not only strength in numbers, but also fanaticism. During the early stages of Volkssturm planning, it became apparent that units lacking morale would lack combat effectiveness. To generate fanaticism, Volkssturm units were placed under the direct command of local Nazi Party officials, the Gauleiter and Kreisleiter. Mass rallies, oath ceremonies, and group singing were designed to instill communal fanaticism.

The new Volkssturm was also to become a nationwide organisation, with Heinrich Himmler as Replacement Army commander, responsible for armaments and training. Though nominally under party control, Volkssturm units were placed under Heer command when engaged in action. At the Reich level, the SS and the Party Chancellery agreed to share responsibility between them. Himmler retained responsibility for military equipment and training while Bormann, head of the Party Chancellery, was charged with oversight of administration and political indoctrination. Aware that a "people's army" would not be able to withstand the onslaught of the modern army wielded by the Allies, Hitler issued the following order towards the end of 1944:

Experience in the East has shown that Volkssturm, emergency and reserve units have little fighting value when left to themselves, and can be quickly destroyed. The fighting value of these units, which are for the most part strong in numbers, but weak in the armaments required for modern battle, is immeasurably higher when they go into action with troops of the regular army in the field. I, therefore, order: where Volkssturm, emergency, and reserve units are available, together with regular units, in any battle sector, mixed battle-groups (brigades) will be formed under unified command, so as to give the Volkssturm, emergency, and reserve units stiffening and support.

With the Nazi Party in charge of organising the Volkssturm, each Gauleiter, or Nazi Party District Leader, was charged with the leadership, enrollment, and organisation of the Volkssturm in their district. The largest Volkssturm unit seems to have corresponded to the next smaller territorial subdivision of the Nazi Party organisation—the Kreis. The basic unit was a battalion of 642 men. Units were mostly composed of members of the Hitler Youth, invalids, the elderly, or men who had previously been considered unfit for military service. On 12 February 1945, the Nazis conscripted German women and girls into the auxiliaries of the Volkssturm. Correspondingly, girls as young as 14 years were trained in the use of small arms, Panzerfausts, machine guns, and hand grenades from December 1944 through May 1945.

Municipal organisation:

- A Bataillon (battalion) in every Kreis (there were 920 Kreise in Greater Germany)
- A Kompanie (company) in every Ortsgruppe (the "local chapter" of the Nazi Party).
- A Zug (platoon) in every Zelle (literally a "cell" of Party members)
- A Gruppe (squad) in every Block (city block)

Each Gauleiter and Kreisleiter had a Volkssturm Chief of Staff.

From the militia's inception until the spring of 1945, Himmler and Bormann engaged in a power-struggle over the jurisdictional control over the Volkssturm regarding security and police powers in Germany and the occupied territories; a contest which Himmler and the SS more or less won on one level (police and security), but lost to Bormann on another (mobilising reserve forces). These disputes over jurisdiction only served to hinder centralized coordination of the Volkssturm, reducing its effectiveness in turn. Historian David Yelton described the situation as two ranking officers at the helm of a sinking ship fighting over command.

Benito Mussolini suggested, through his son Vittorio, then general secretary of the Republican Fascist Party's German branch, that 30,000 Italians should be added to the Volkssturm in the defence of Germany. However, no evidence exists that this offer was implemented. Meanwhile, there were cases when criminals and foreigners were inducted into the Volkssturm if the authorities determined them to be ideologically acceptable.

== Uniforms and insignia ==
Volkssturm armband

The Volkssturm "uniform" was only a black armband with the German words Deutscher Volkssturm Wehrmacht ("German People's Storm, (of the) Armed Forces"). The German government tried to issue as many of its members as possible with military uniforms of all sorts, ranging from Feldgrau to camouflage types. To this end, the Nazi government meant for members of the Volkssturm to wear uniforms and avoid "partisan" weapons in order to maintain legality under international agreements, but this did not always prove practicable.

Often, the members wore a motley assortment of whatever they could find for their uniforms; a telling example of the Volkssturm's piecemeal outfitting occurred in the Rhineland, where one unit was provided with "pre-war black SS uniforms, brown Organization Todt coats, blue Luftwaffe auxiliary caps, and French Adrian helmets." Most members of the Volkssturm, especially elderly members, had no uniforms at all and were not supplied, so they generally wore either work uniforms (including railway workers, policemen, and firemen), Hitler Youth uniforms, old uniforms or parts of uniforms from the First World War, or their civilian clothing and usually carried with them their own personal rucksacks, blankets, cooking-equipment, etc.

== Ranks ==
The simple paramilitary insignia of the Volkssturm were as follows:

Volkssturm Rank	Translation	Comparative military rank	Insignia
Bataillonsführer	Battalion leader	Major
Bataillonsarzt	Battalion physician	Captain	with Rod of Asclepius
Kompanieführer	Company leader	Captain
Zugführer	Platoon leader	Lieutenant
Sanitätsdienstgrad	[Platoon] Medical orderly	Corporal
Gruppenführer	Squad leader	Corporal
Volkssturmmann	People's storm man	Private

== Training and impact ==
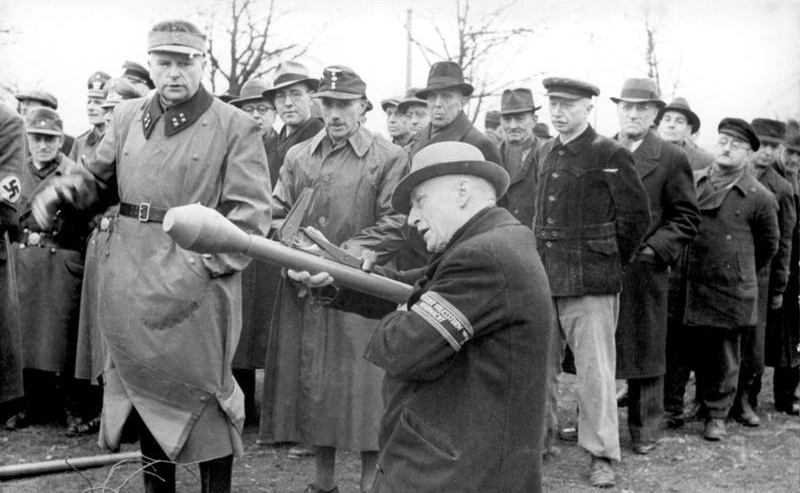
Volkssturm members being trained to use the Panzerfaust anti-tank weapon, February or March 1945

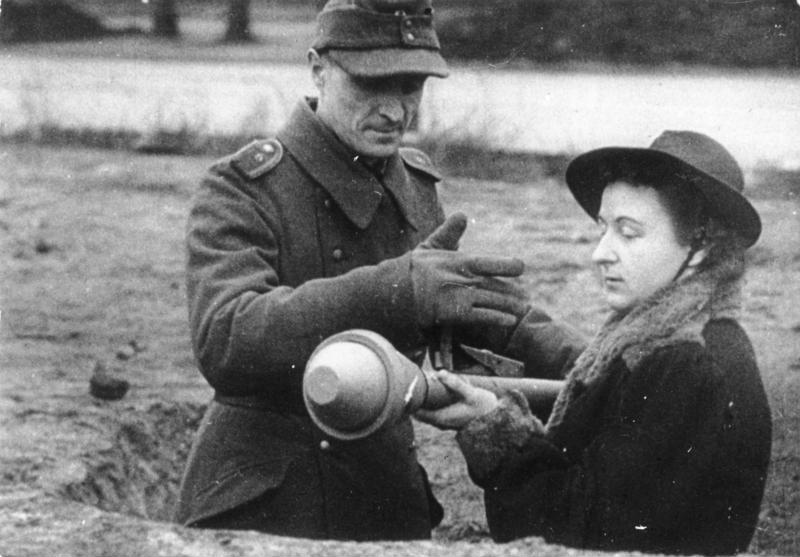
Volkssturm trooper explaining the handling of a Panzerfaust to a female civilian, March 1945

Typically, members of the Volkssturm received only very basic military training. Training across the Reich was inconsistent and typically brief; for many, learning military operations was often nothing more than a few evening or weekend sessions with outdated weaponry. Many units were instructed in basic rifle handling, anti-tank tactics, and urban defense, but few received sustained or professional instruction. Historian David Yelton notes that ideological indoctrination was prioritized alongside military instruction, though Volkssturm members generally responded more positively to practical training than to propaganda. The lack of weapons, ammunition, and experienced instructors further hampered combat readiness, leading many units to enter battle ill-prepared and with dangerously low morale.

There was no standardisation of any kind and units were issued only what equipment was available. This was true of every form of equipment—Volkssturm members were required to bring their own uniforms and culinary equipment etc. This resulted in the units looking very ragged and, instead of boosting civilian morale, it often reminded people of Germany's desperate state. Armament was equally haphazard: though some Karabiner 98ks were on hand, members were also issued older Gewehr 98s, Steyr-Mannlicher M1895s, 19th-century Gewehr 71s, and Steyr-Mannlicher M1888s, as well as Dreyse M1907 pistols. In addition there was a plethora of Soviet, British, Belgian, French, Italian, and other weapons that had been captured by German forces during the war. The Germans had also developed cheap Volkssturm weapons, such as MP 3008 machine pistols and Volkssturmgewehr rifles. These were completely stamped and machine-pressed constructions (in the 1940s, industrial processes were much cruder than today, so a firearm needed great amounts of semi-artisanal work to be actually reliable). The Volkssturm troops were nominally supplied when and where possible by both the Wehrmacht and the SS. By the end of January 1945, the Volkssturm had only accumulated 40,500 rifles and 2,900 machine guns amid this mish-mash of foreign and outdated assemblage of weapons.

When units had completed their training and received armament, members took a customary oath to Hitler and were then dispatched into combat. Teenagers and middle-aged men were sent to separate training camps, some of whom received as little as ten to fourteen days of training before being sent to fight. Unlike most English-speaking countries, Germany had universal military service for all young men for several generations, so many of the older members would have had at least basic military training from when they served in the German Army and many would have been veterans of the First World War. Volkssturm units were supposed to be used only in their own districts, but many were sent directly to the front lines. Ultimately, it was their charge to confront the overwhelming power of the British, Canadian, Soviet, American, and French armies alongside Wehrmacht forces to turn the tide of the war by fighting to the last. (Note: Also see: Berd Wegner, "Zweite Weltkrieg und die Choreographie des Untergangs", Geschichte und Gesellschaft, vol. xxvi (2000), no. 3, pp. 492–518.) Fanatical members of the Volkssturm remained committed Nazis despite the desperate situation, and in a number of instances took brutal "police actions" against German civilians deemed defeatists or cowards.

Losses were high among the Volkssturm – Battalion 25/235 for instance, started out with 400 men but fought on until there were only 10 men remaining. Fighting at Küstrin between 30 January and 29 March 1945, militia units made up mostly of the Volkssturm resisted for nearly two months. Losses were upwards of 60 percent for the Volkssturm at Kolberg, roughly 1,900 of them died at Breslau, and during the Battle of Königsberg, another 2,400 members of the Volkssturm were killed. At other times along the western front particularly, Volkssturm troops would cast their arms aside and disappear into the chaos.

Many units lost their enthusiasm for the fight when it became clear that the Allies had won, prompting them to lay down their weapons and surrender – they also feared being captured by Allied forces and tortured or executed as partisans. Duty to their communities also played a part in their capitulation, as did self-preservation. In the end, only approximately 150,000 Volkssturm members experienced serious military action; most served in auxiliary roles.

== Battle of Berlin ==
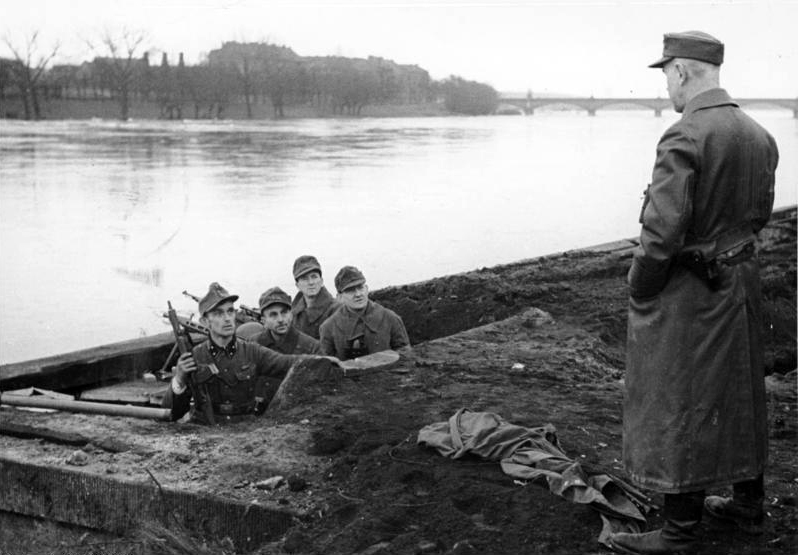
Volkssturm members receiving orders in an entrenched position along the Oder River, February 1945. They possess a mixed assortment of firearms, including a VG 1-5, a MG 42 and a scope-equipped Karabiner 98k. These men were expected to die holding their position.

Their most extensive use was during the Battle of Berlin, where Volkssturm units fought in many parts of the city. This battle was particularly devastating to its formations; however, many members fought to the death out of fear of being captured by the Soviets. The Volkssturm had a strength of about 60,000 in the Berlin area, formed into 92 battalions, of which about 30 battalions of Volkssturm I (those with some weapons) were sent to forward positions, while those of Volkssturm II (those without weapons) remained in the inner city. One of the few substantive fighting units left to defend Berlin was the LVI Panzer Corps, which occupied the southeastern sector of the town, whereas the remaining parts of the city were being defended by what remained of the SS, the Volkssturm, and the Hitler Youth formations. Nonetheless, a force of over 2.5 million Soviet troops, equipped with 6,250 tanks and over 40,000 artillery pieces, were assigned to capture the city, and the diminished remnants of the Wehrmacht were no match for them. Meanwhile, Hitler denounced every perceived "betrayal" to the inhabitants of the Führerbunker. Not eager to die what was thought to be a pointless death, many older members of the Volkssturm looked for places to hide from the approaching Soviet Army.

One notable and unusual Volkssturm unit in the Battle for Berlin was the 3/115 Siemensstadt Battalion. It comprised 770 men, mostly World War I veterans in their 50s who were reasonably fit factory workers, with experienced officers. Unlike most Volkssturm units it was quite well equipped and trained. It was formed into three rifle companies, a support company (with two infantry support guns, four infantry mortars, and heavy machine guns), and a heavy weapons company (with four Soviet M-20 howitzers and a French De Bange 220mm mortar). The battalion first engaged Soviet troops at Friedrichsfelde on 21 April and saw the heaviest fighting over the following two days. It held out until 2 May, by which time it was down to just 50 rifles and two light machine guns. The survivors fell back to join other Volkssturm units. Twenty-six men from the battalion were awarded the Iron Cross. Allied bombing and Soviet artillery had reduced Berlin to rubble; meanwhile the final stand in Berlin dwindled to fighting against highly trained, battle-hardened Soviet troops on the brink of final victory, who viewed resistance fighters like the Volkssturm as terrorists in much the same way the Wehrmacht once had viewed potential partisans during Operation Barbarossa. Red Army soldiers called the Hitler Youth formations and members of the Volkssturm still fighting to the end in Berlin "totals" for being part of Germany's total mobilisation effort.

== Role in atrocities ==
On several occasions, members of the Volkssturm participated in atrocities. During January 1945, thousands of prisoners were evacuated and force-marched from several smaller concentration camps—which included Jesau, Seerappen, Schippenbeil, Gerdauen, and Helgenbeil—near Königsberg, many dying along the way. Upon reaching Palmnicken, some 2,500 to 3,000 prisoners of the 5,000 that originally began the journey were lodged in a factory. Mayor and local Nazi party chief, Kurt Friedrichs wanted the SS to send these prisoners on their way since the Red Army was not far away. When local Volkssturm leader Hans Feyerabend was ordered to transport the suffering prisoners out of the town, he refused to carry out the order and was heard exclaiming that he would not permit a massacre like the one at Katyń forest. Feyerabend even assigned Volkssturm guards to keep watch on the local Nazi party members, but this proved fruitless when Friedrich armed a group of Hitler Youth and likewise summoned the local SD elements, whose leaders then commanded the Volkssturm to help evacuate the prisoners. On 30 January 1945, after the Volkssturm left with Friedrich in charge, Feyerabend committed suicide; then between 30 January and 1 February the prisoners were murdered by the remaining assemblage of SS guards, Hitler Youth, and the local Volkssturm unit.

When prisoners fell sick with typhus in Reichsgau Steiermark during February–March 1945, SS men, Hitler Youth, and Volkssturm units systematically murdered them. Under the orders of Loeben-district Kreisleiter, Otto Christandl, Volkssturm units in nearby Graz and Eisenerz assisted the Gestapo and Ukrainian Waffen-SS troops in evacuating between 6,000 and 8,000 prisoners—being marched towards Mauthausen—from their region, many of whom were murdered during the journey when they collapsed from exhaustion.

Beyond battlefield conduct, some Volkssturm formations were used to enforce curfews, assist in deportations, and guard prisoner-of-war or concentration camp transports. Yelton notes that in many regions, particularly where the SS had strong influence, the Volkssturm was co-opted into auxiliary policing and punitive roles that blurred the line between civilian defense and participation in state terror. These activities, though not always centrally coordinated, contributed to the postwar narrative that the Volkssturm was not merely a desperate militia but at times complicit in Nazi crimes.

Sometime in early April 1945 as Allied forces approached the Mittelwerk facilities—where V2 rockets were being produced—the slave labourers from the Mittelbau-Dora concentration camp were force-marched from the western Harz by a collection of guards drawn from the military, the Hitler Youth, and the Volkssturm. Approximately 40 km (25 mi) north of Magdeburg, in the village of Mieste, this motley assemblage of guards locked a thousand of these prisoners in a barn and burned them alive at the instruction of a local Nazi Party leader; this event came to be known as the Gardelegen massacre. Over 1,000 persons were murdered during this event. At the town of Celle in Lower Saxony around the same time, members of the SS, SA, local police, Hitler Youth, and Volkssturm were aided by locals to "hunt down and shoot" prisoners who had fled into the local woodland after their transport train was bombed.

== Final phase ==
While Iron Crosses were being handed out in places like Berlin, other cities and towns like Parchim and Mecklenburg witnessed old elites, acting as military commandants over the Hitler Youth and Volkssturm, asserting themselves and demanding that the defensive fighting stop so as to spare lives and property. Despite their efforts, the last four months of the war were an exercise in futility for the Volkssturm, and the Nazi leadership's insistence to continue the fight to the bitter end contributed to an additional 1.23 million (approximated) deaths, half of them German military personnel and the other half from the Volkssturm. (Note: The figure put forward by the historian Stephen Fritz does not match the observations of Richard J. Evans, who reported 175,000 Volkssturm members killed when fighting the professional armies of the western Allies and the Soviet Union. Evans' figures are based on the members listed in the index cards and reported as killed, while Martin Sorge pointed out that this figure did not include the 30,000 listed as presumed missing or dead in a 1963 report.)

In many small towns, when leading members of the Volkssturm refused to fight on against the superior forces of the Allies—part of an attempt to circumvent the "total destruction" of their home regions—they were tried and "summarily hanged" by party activists. During the spring of 1945, thousands of Volkssturm members were killed like this by Nazi Party fanatics in Franken.

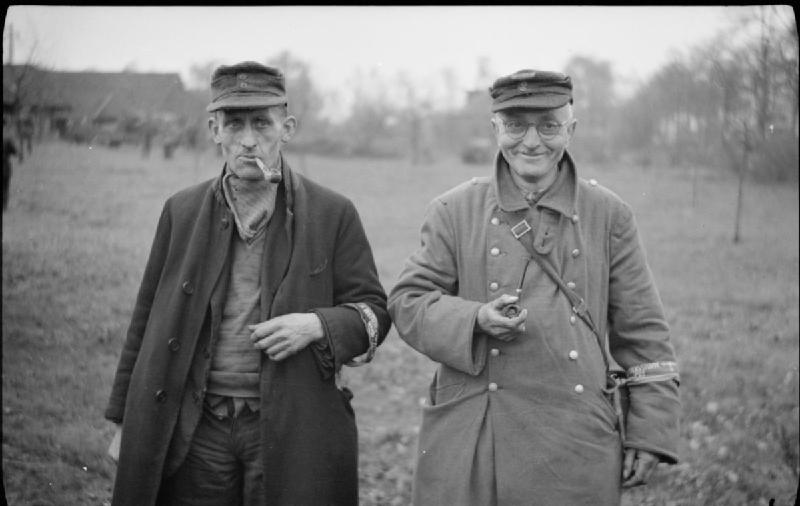
Two members of the Volkssturm after surrendering to British troops near Bocholt, 28 March 1945

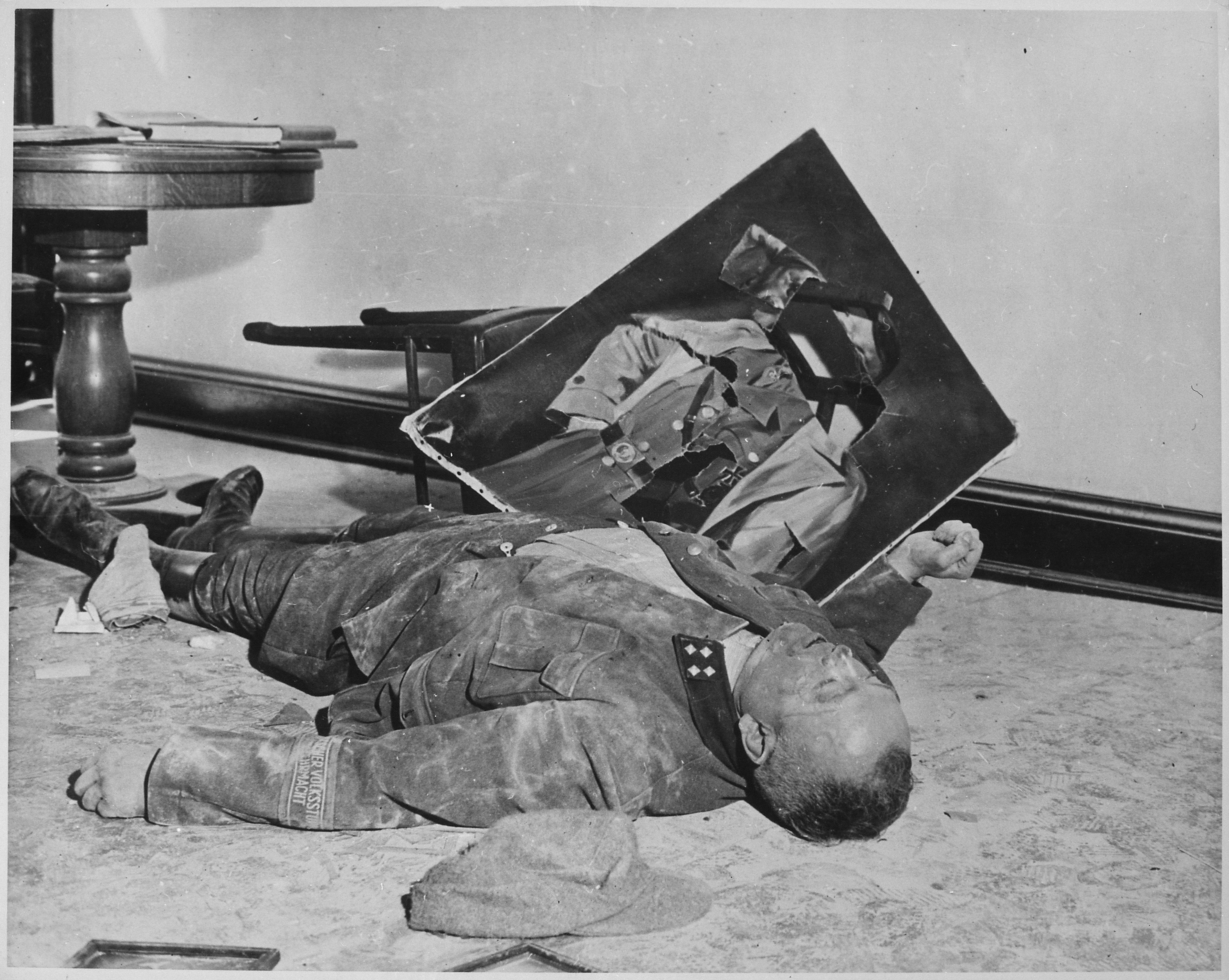
Volkssturm Major Walter Dönicke lies dead after committing suicide in Leipzig Germany 19 April 1945

== Postwar treatment and legacy ==
Interrogated members of the Volkssturm—when questioned as to where the regular forces had gone—revealed that German soldiers surrendered to the Americans and British instead of the Red Army for fear of reprisals related to the atrocities the German forces committed in the Soviet Union. Correspondingly, Yelton writes that "Defeat and occupation by the Western Allies simply did not hold the same personal or collective horror for Germans as did losing to the Soviets." He adds that many Volkssturm men began to believe it would be "better to let the Americans and British get as far east as possible."

After Germany’s surrender in May 1945, the fate of Volkssturm members varied dramatically based on the occupying power. In the Western Allied zones, most Volkssturm fighters were treated leniently, particularly if they had surrendered peacefully or had not participated in combat. American and British forces generally classified them as lightly armed conscripts and released many after brief internment, unless specific war crimes were alleged. By contrast, Soviet treatment was far harsher; Volkssturm members captured by Red Army forces were often viewed as partisans or ideological enemies and were frequently executed or deported to labor camps in the USSR. Yelton argues that the legacy of the Volkssturm in postwar Germany was one of ambiguity. On one hand, it symbolized the desperation and collapse of the Nazi regime, as civilians were pressed into hopeless combat against overwhelming Allied forces. On the other hand, some veterans and Nazi loyalists attempted to cast the Volkssturm as a heroic last stand for German sovereignty and unity. In broader historiography, however, the militia is more often remembered as an expression of the regime’s refusal to surrender and its willingness to sacrifice its own people in pursuit of ideological goals.

== Notable members ==
- Otto Dix, German painter
- Martin Heidegger, German philosopher
- Otto Herzog, received the Knight's Cross of the Iron Cross
- Hans Modrow, penultimate Prime Minister of East Germany
- Ernst Tiburzy, received the Knight's Cross of the Iron Cross
- Gustav Anton von Wietersheim, WWI veteran and WWII general dismissed for apparent failures early in the Battle of Stalingrad, who served in the Volkssturm as a private

== In fiction ==
- Gregor Dorfmeister, under the pseudonym of Manfred Gregor, in 1958 published the novel Die Brücke, based on his experiences in a Volkssturm unit. The novel was adapted to film the following year and to a made-for-television movie in 2008.
- Volkssturm units composed of teenagers are depicted in battle scenes in the 2004 film Downfall. (Note: See Downfall (2004) on IMDB.com: https://www.imdb.com/title/tt0363163/?___441)
- Volkssturm units composed of teenagers are depicted in scenes in the sixth episode of the 2019 Das Erste series Charité at War.
- Volkssturm units are seen in battle scenes in the 2019 film Jojo Rabbit by Taika Waititi.
- Volkssturm units composed of teenagers are depicted in battle scenes in the 2014 film Fury.
- Volkssturm units composed of teenagers and children are depicted in scenes in the ninth episode of the 2024 series Masters of the Air.

== See also ==
- Einstossflammenwerfer 46
- Landwehr
- Volksgrenadier
- Volkspistole
- Wachdienst
- Werwolf
- Niederkaina massacre

Other nations:

- Black Brigades (Italy)
- Home Guard (United Kingdom)
- Volunteer Fighting Corps (Japan)
