= Mord in bester Gesellschaft =

- Created by: crime film
- Starring: Fritz Wepper, Sophie Wepper, Johann Schuler, Heinz Werner Kraehkamp, Wayne Carpendale, Thomas Kress, Louisa von Spies
- Country of origin: Germany, Spain (episode 1), Swedes (episode 2)
- Original language: German
- No. of seasons: 1
- No. of episodes: 15

Production
- Running time: 90

Original release
- Network: ARD
- Release: 2007 – 2017

Mord in bester Gesellschaft (litt. Murder in the best company) is a German television series starring Fritz Wepper, as Dr. Wendelin Winter - a psychiatrist, and his daughter Sophie Wepper, who took on the role of Wendelin's daughter Alexandra

== Plot ==
The stories are presented from the perspective of the psychiatrist Dr. Wendelin Winter (Fritz Wepper) and his daughter Alexandra (Sophie Wepper) tells. Action-packed shootouts and chases are avoided. The cases are dealt with in calm, atmospheric images in atmospheric locations. In the manner of Agatha-Christie-Film adaptations and the American one Columbo-series focuses on the intellectual elucidation of the acts through focused questioning and sharp combining.

== Production ==
The first episode was produced by the Austrian film production company Lisa Film, the second episode of the Mona Film produces. Since the third episode it has been Tivoli film, a sister company of Mona Film based in Bad Homburg vor der Höhe, responsible for the production of the series. The scenarists are Rolf-Rene Schneider (episode 1–10), Stefan Cantz, Jan Hinter, Rainer Berg, Jens Jendrich, Dirk Kämper, Lars Mondag, Maja Brandstetter and Wolfgang Brandstetter. The directors are Peter Sämann, Hans Werner, Hajo Gies, Peter Stauch and Lars Montag.

== Cast ==
| Actors | Role name | Consequences |
|---|---|---|
| Fritz Wepper | Psychiatrist Dr. Wendelin Winter | 1–15 |
| Sophie Wepper | Alexandra Winter | 1–15 |
| Johann Schuler | Commissioner Ackermann | 4, 6, 8 |
| Heinz Werner Kraehkamp | Commissioner Schlüter | 7 |
| Wayne Carpendale | Chief Commissioner (previously Commissioner) Donald Becker | 11–15 |

== Episode list ==
| No. | Original title | Original airing | Director | Scenarist | Viewers |
|---|---|---|---|---|---|
| 1 | Mord in bester Gesellschaft | 22. Feb 2007 | Peter Sämann | Rolf-René Schneider | 6.54 million. |
| 2 | Der Tote im Elchwald | 14. Feb 2008 | Peter Sämann | Rolf-René Schneider | 5.23 million. |
| 3 | Die Nächte des Herrn Senator | 25. Oct 2008 | Hans Werner | Rolf-René Schneider | 4.90 million. |
| 4 | Der süße Duft des Bösen | 15. Jan 2009 | Peter Sämann | Rolf-René Schneider | 6.18 million. |
| 5 | Das eitle Gesicht des Todes | 4. Jan 2010 | Hans Werner | Rolf-René Schneider | 4.72 million. |
| 6 | Alles Böse zum Hochzeitstag | 14. Jan 2010 | Hans Werner | Rolf-René Schneider | 6.01 million. |
| 7 | Die Lüge hinter der Wahrheit | 6. Jan 2011 | Peter Sämann | Rolf-René Schneider | 4.83 million. |
| 8 | Das Ende vom Lied | 31. March 2011 | Hans Werner | Rolf-René Schneider | 3.68 million. |
| 9 | Der Fluch der bösen Tat | 24. Sep 2011 | Peter Sämann | Rolf-René Schneider | 4.41 million. |
| 10 | Der Tod der Sünde | 25. Feb 2012 | Hajo Gies | Rolf-René Schneider | 6.90 million. |
| 11 | In Teufels Küche | 12. Dec 2013 | Hajo Gies | Stefan Cantz, Jan Hinter | 3.89 million. |
| 12 | Die Täuschung | 15. Jan 2015 | Peter Stauch | Rainer Berg, Jens Jendrich | 3.44 million. |
| 13 | Das Scheusal | 11. June 2015 | Lars Montag | Dirk Kämper, Lars Montag | 4.00 million. |
| 14 | Bitteres Erbe | 10. Dec 2015 | Peter Stauch | Rainer Berg, Jens Jendrich | 3.83 million. |
| 15 | Winters letzter Fall | 20. Apr 2017 | Peter Stauch | Maja Brandstetter, Wolfgang Brandstetter | 5.14 million. |

== See also ==
- List of German television series
