= Girl friends – Freundschaft mit Herz =

- Created by: Christian Pfannenschmidt
- Country of origin: Germany
- No. of seasons: 7
- No. of episodes: 92

Production
- Running time: 45 minutes

Original release
- Network: ZDF
- Release: 26 December 1995 – 13 October 2007

girl friends – Freundschaft mit Herz is a German television series.

== See also ==
- List of German television series
