= Um Himmels Willen =

German television series

- Genre: Sitcom
- Created by: Jana Brandt; Sven Döbler; Claudia Sihler
- Starring: Fritz Wepper; Andrea Sihler; Janina Hartwig; Jutta Speidel; Denise M'Babye; Emanuela von Frankenberg; Anna Luise Kiss; Andrea Wildner; Horst Sachtleben; Lars Weström; Karin Gregorek; Wolfgang Müller
- Theme music composer: Birger Heymann; Philipp F. Kölmel; Arnold Fritzsch; Nik Reich; Ludwig Eckmann
- Country of origin: Germany
- Original language: German
- No. of seasons: 20
- No. of episodes: 260

Production
- Executive producers: Jana Brandt; Sven Döbler; Claudia Sihler; Siegfried B. Glökler; Jan S. Kaiser
- Production location: Germany
- Camera setup: Multi-camera
- Running time: 45–50 minutes (per episode)
- Production company: ARD

Original release
- Network: ARD
- Release: 8 January 2002

Um Himmels Willen (English: For Heaven's Sake) is a German television sitcom created by Jana Brandt and Sven Döbler, which originally aired on Das Erste since 8 January 2002. The 13th season was aired from 4 March 2014 to 3 June 2014 and is syndicated in many European countries.

The series follows the daily life of a group of nuns in a small monastery in the fictional town of Kaltenthal in lower Bavaria, and the careers of the town's troubled citizens, mostly the mayor and police officers. The sitcom was produced by ARD. It originally starred Jutta Speidel as the main character of the head nun, however she was replaced by Janina Hartwig in 2007. Fritz Wepper appears as her antagonist, the cunning and jovial town mayor.

The show aired at 20:15 on Tuesday nights on ARD in Germany. By June 2013, 156 episodes had been broadcast over eleven seasons. Besides being immensely popular in Germany (with some 7.2 million views per episode), the show is also broadcast daily in Austria, Switzerland, Italy, Hungary, and Denmark.

== Plot ==
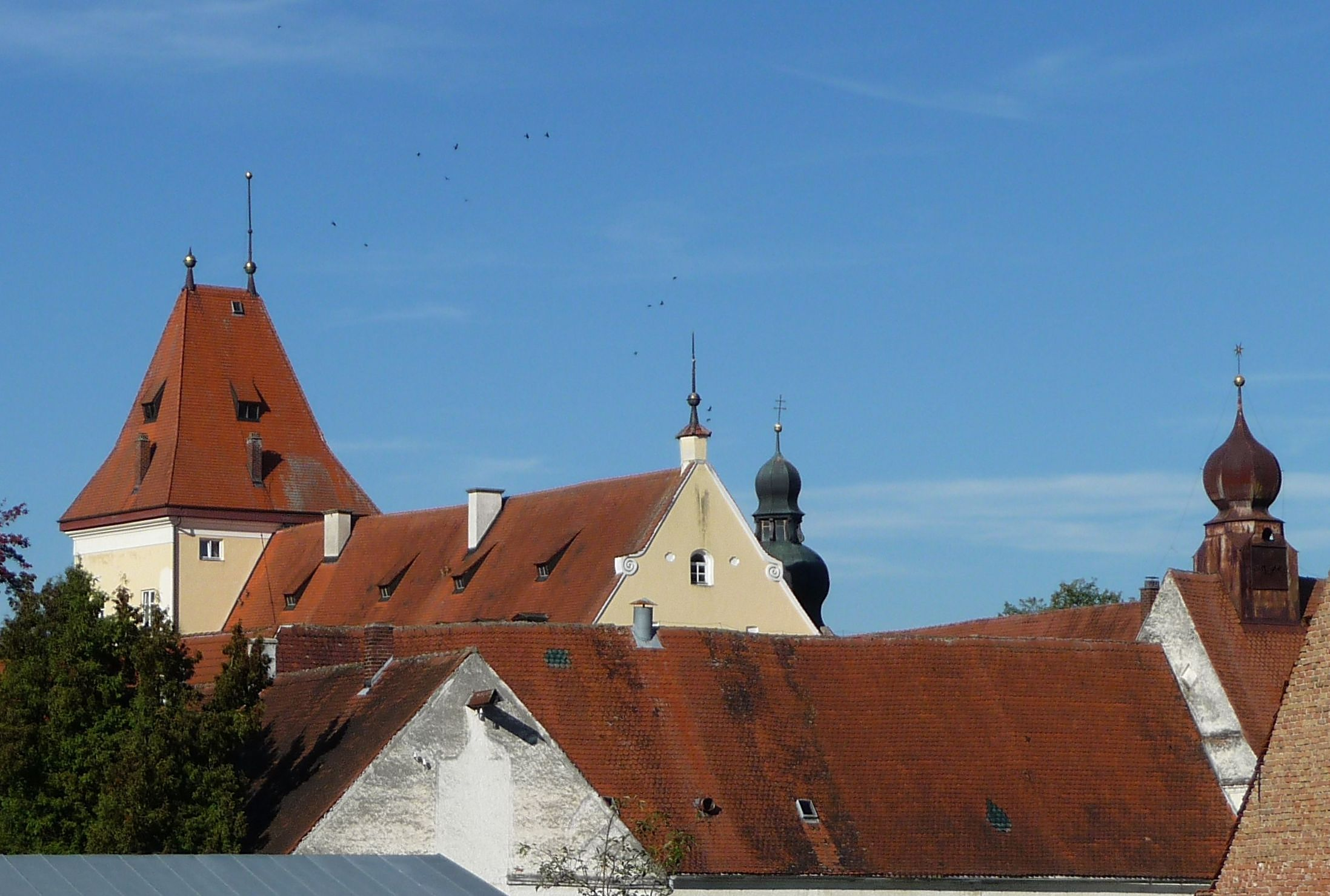
Niederaichbach Castle was the location of Kloster Kaltenthal (Kaltenthal nunnery)

Wolfgang Wöller (Fritz Wepper), the popular politician and mayor of the fictitious Lower Bavarian town of Kaltenthal, is afraid of losing support and possible elections due an increase in unemployment. Along with the city council, he falls in love with the idea of bioenergy; determined to put his face and name upon a new, large bioenergy facility that will, hopefully, create economic growth for the town, he needs the support of opposition, who refuse to support the idea as there is no immediate place to put such a facility.

Eventually, his eyes fall upon the local cloisters, a large, old castle which houses only six nuns, but swallows up a huge areal portion of the city. As the nuns, especially Sister Hanna (Janina Hartwig), refuse to even discuss the idea of selling the property, Mr. Wöller takes his ideas to the order's Mother Superior. The Mother Superior is equally opposed to the idea, but agrees that six nuns are not enough for such a huge property. She ultimately reluctantly agrees to sell. Sister Hanna does everything in her power to prevent this, not only going against the mayor, but also the Mother Superior.

== Cast ==
=== Current main cast ===
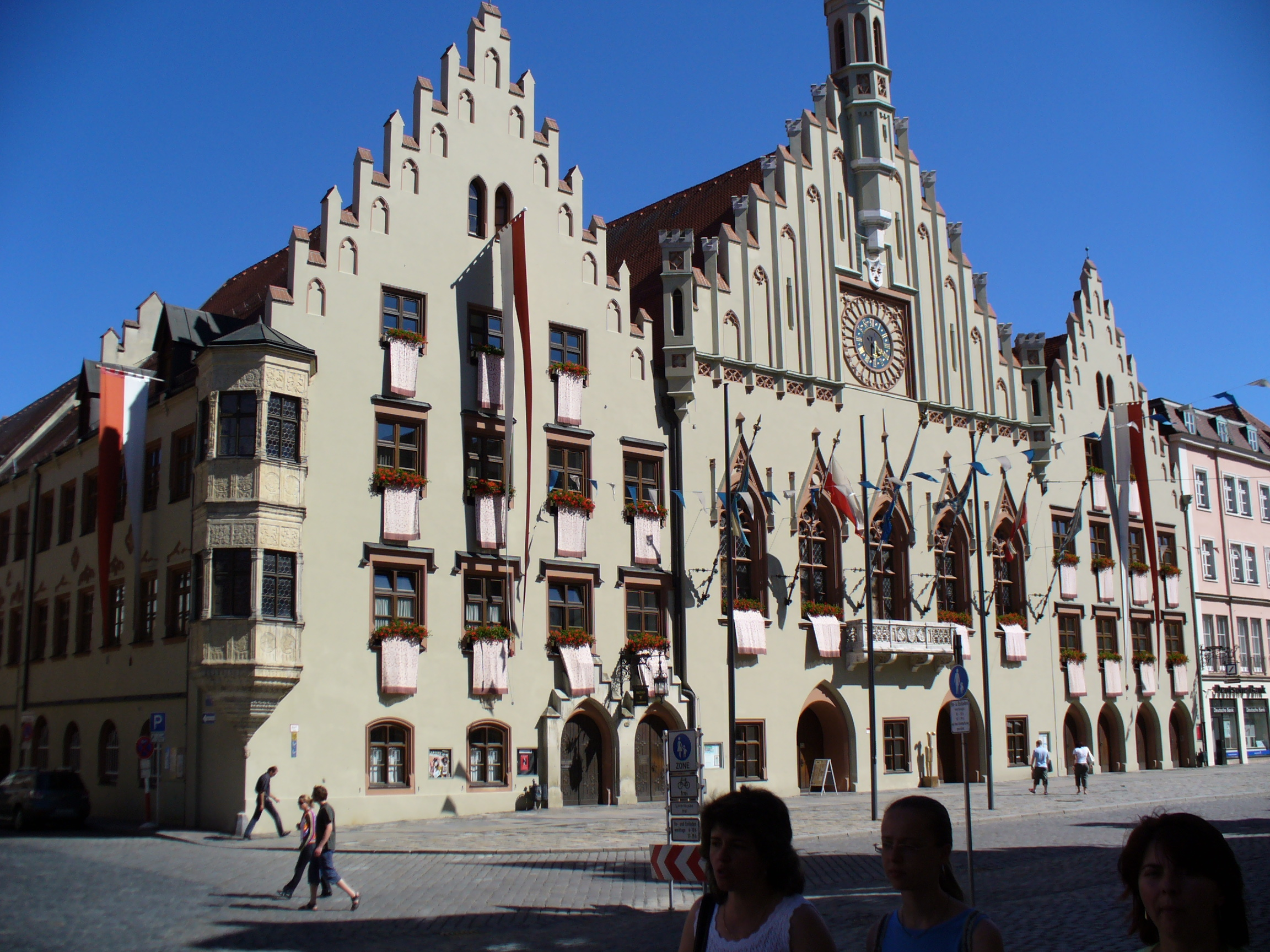
Townhall of Landshut in downtown, location also of Major Wöller's office

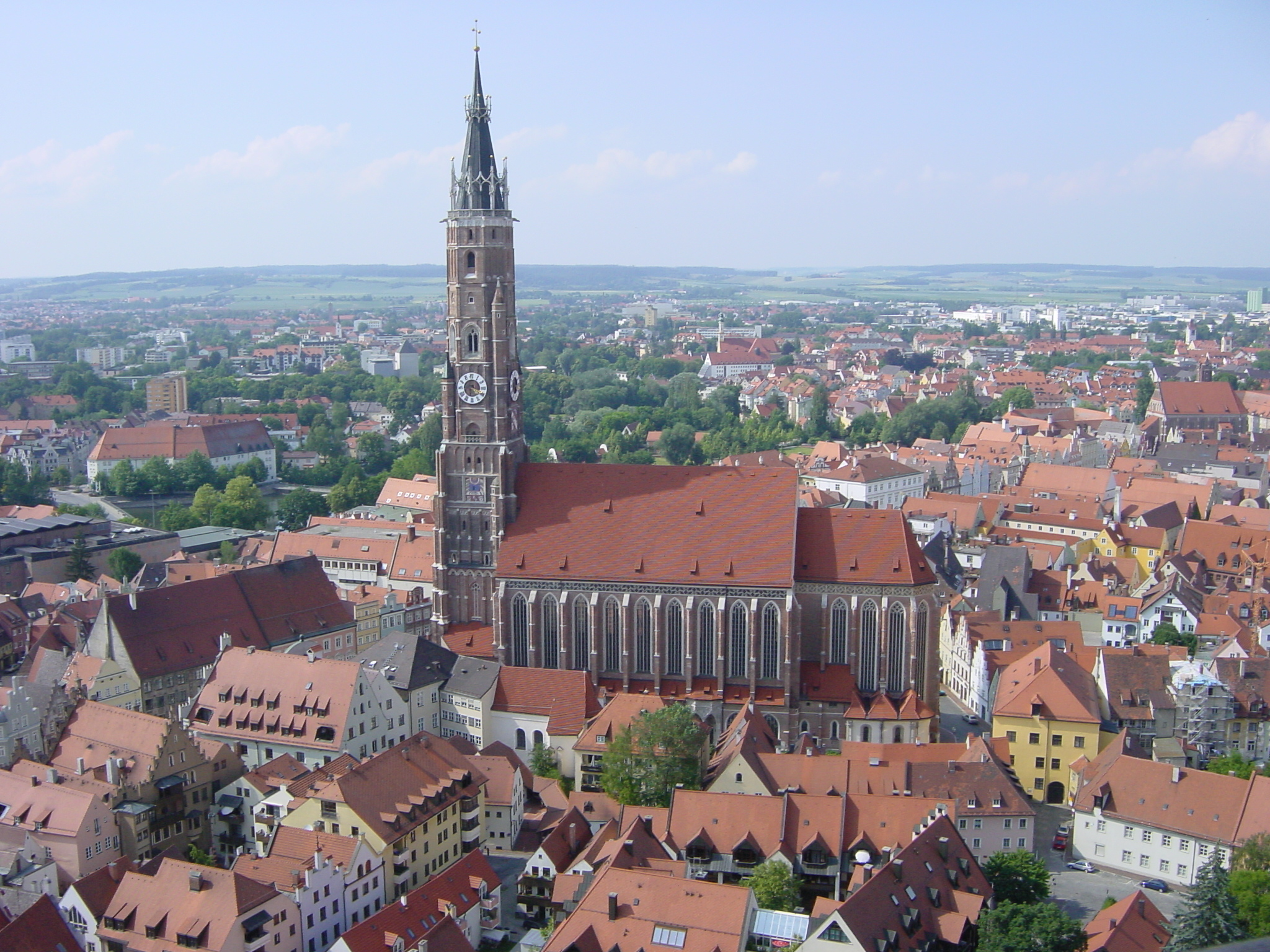
Stiftsbasilika St. Martin (Landshut) and Kalthenthal police station (yellow building front right)

- Janina Hartwig as Sister Hanna Jacobi. Nun and leader of cloister Kaltenthal.
- Fritz Wepper as Wolfgang Wöller. Mayor of the fictitious town of Kaltentahl and car dealer. Chairman of the Kaltenthal Football Club.
- Karin Gregorek as Sister Felicitas Meier. Nun, one of sister Hanna's predecessors. Until her retirement nurse at Kaltenthal hospital, then leader of a medical consulting center for socially weak people. Preference for alcohol, tobacco, computer games and chocolate.
- Emmanuela von Frankenberg as Sister Agnes Schwandt. Nun and cook of the cloister. Herb woman.
- Denise M'Baye as Sister Lela. Novation at cloister Kaltenthal. Sent by sister Lotte from Nigeria.
- Andrea Sihler as Sister Hildegard Hähnlein. Nun at the mother house in Munich and secretary of the mother superior. Secondarily novelist.
- Horst Sachtleben as Bishop Gottlieb Rossbauer. Friend and confessor of the mother superior. Likes cookies. Renounces creation as cardinal.
- Andrea Wildner as Marianne Laban. Secretary of mayor Wöller. In season 12 temporary opposition leader at local council
- Lars Weström as Anton Meier. Indulgent Polizeihauptmeister (policeman) of Kaltenthal.
- Wolfgang Müller as Hermann Huber. Master builder and best friend of Wolfgang Wöller.

=== Former main cast ===
- Rosel Zech as Dr. Dr. Elisabeth Reuter. Ex mother superior.
- Gaby Dohm as Baroness Louise von Beilheim. Mother superior and successor of mother superior Elisabeth Reuter.
- Jutta Speidel as Sister Lotte Albers. Nun and direct predecessor of sister Hanna. Now leader of a mission station in Nigeria.
- Michael Wenninger as Doctor Martin Richter. Physician and fiancé of Barbara Silenius. Died after a car crash.
- Anna Luise Kiss as Barbara Silenius. Former novation at cloister Kaltenthal. Leaves the cloister and become engaged with Doctor Martin Richter, who dies after a car crash. Barbara later marries an architect but the marriage fails. Barbara Silenius dies after a car accident.
- Hellen Zellweger as Julia Seewald. Former novation at cloister Kaltenthal. Leaves the cloister.
- Anne Weinknecht as Sister Sophe Tiezte. Former novation at cloister Kaltenthal, later nun. Now missionary in South America.
- Donia Ben-Jemia as Sister Gina Gallo. Former novation at cloister Kaltenthal, later nun. Goes to Naples to nurse her ill father.
- Nathalie Schott as Sister Ingrid Knoop. Former novation at cloister Kaltenthal, now nun at a cloister in Cologne.
- Antje Mönning as Sister Jenny Marquard. Former novation at cloister Kaltenthal, now nun and nurse of the ill Cardinal.
- Julia Heinze as Maria Gasser. Former undercover journalist, later novation at cloister Kaltenthal. Leaves the cloister and marries.
- Bruni Löbel as Grandma Meier. Grandmother of police man Anton Meier.

== Seasons ==
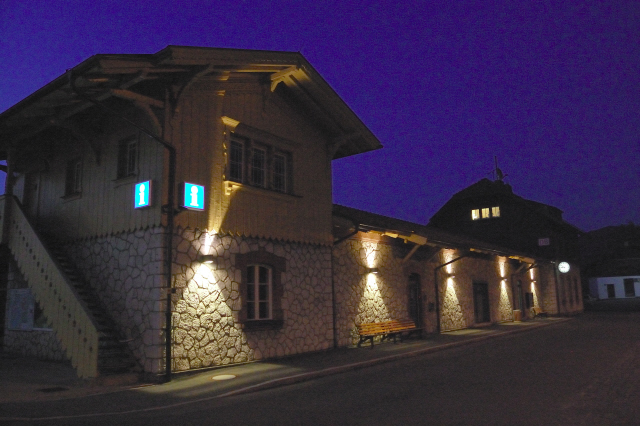
Kochel am See station was used for Kalthenthal train station in most episodes

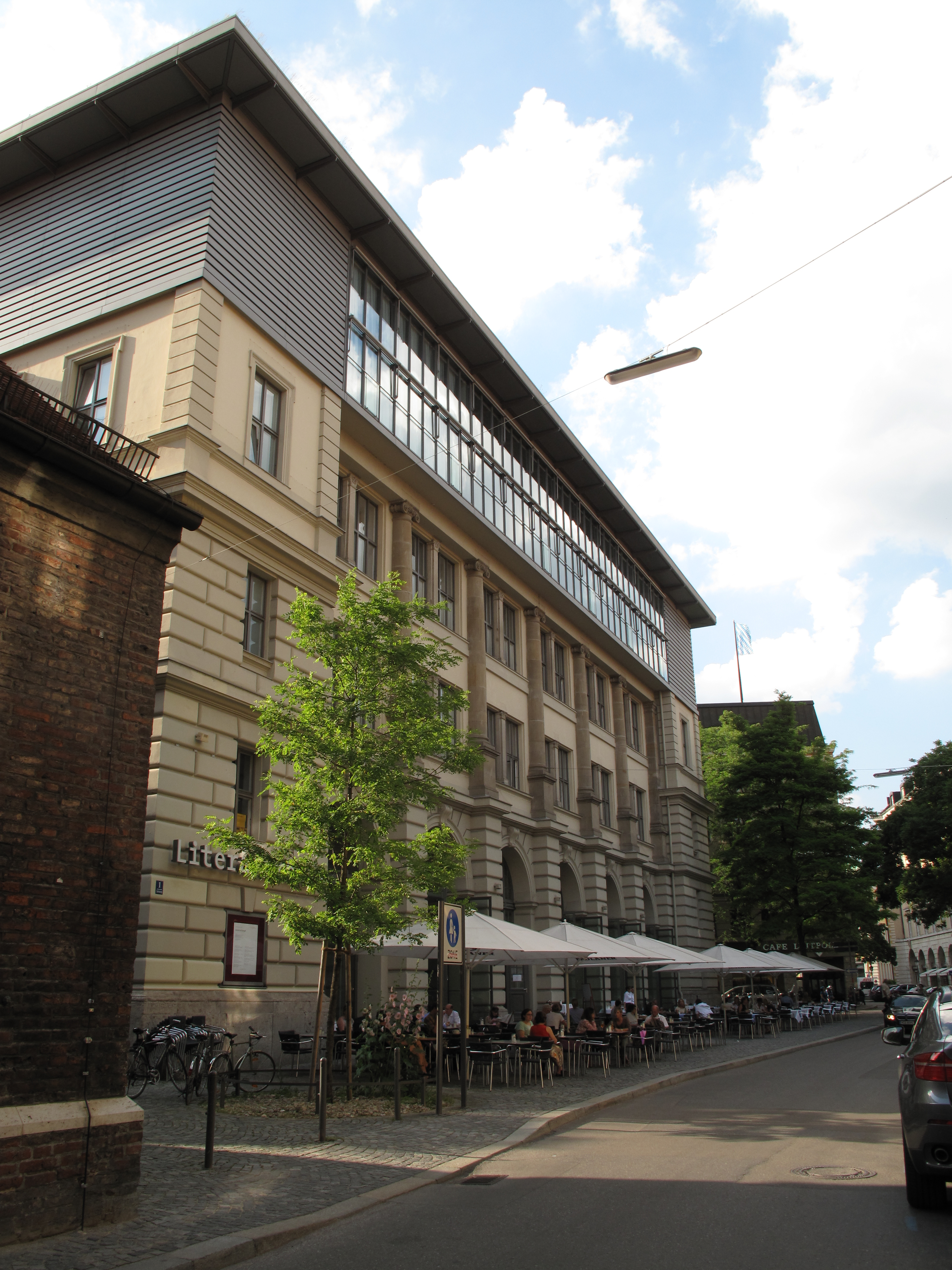
Headquarter of the order and office of mother soperior, in reality Literaturhaus München next to Salvatorkirche at Salvatorplatz in Munich

=== Series overview ===
Season 1
Number (whole)	Number (Season)	Original title	First broadcast
1	1	Urlaub mit Folgen (Vacation with consequences)	8 January 2002
2	2	Sand im Getriebe (Wrench in the works)	15 January 2002
3	3	Glück im Unglück (Blessing in disguise)	22 January 2002
4	4	Mädchen am Abgrund (Girl on the brink)	29 January 2002
5	5	Romeo und Julia (Romeo and Juliet)	5 February 2002
6	6	Schlag auf Schlag (Blow by blow)	19 February 2002
7	7	Wolf im Schafspelz (Wolf in sheep's clothing)	26 February 2002
8	8	Gelegenheit macht Diebe (Opportunity makes the thief)	5 March 2002
9	9	Sünden der Vergangenheit (Sins of the past)	12 March 2002
10	10	Qual der Wahl (Agony of choice)	19 March 2002
11	11	Verbotene Früchte (Forbidden fruits)	26 March 2002
12	12	Sieg der Liebe (Victory of love)	2 April 2002
13	13	Kleider machen Leute (Clothes make the man)	9 April 2002

Season 2
Number (whole)	Number (Season)	Original title	First broadcast
14	1	Heiliger Strohsack (Holy moley)	7 January 2003
15	2	Salto Mortale	14 January 2003
16	3	Zwickmühle (Quagmire)	21 January 2003
17	4	Plötzlich und unerwartet (Suddenly and surprisingly)	28 January 2003
18	5	Falsche Fünzigerin (Backstabber)	11 February 2003
19	6	Gefahrenzone (Danger area)	18 February 2003
20	7	Belagerungszustand (State of siege))	25 February 2003
21	8	Hokuspokus (Hocus-pocus)	11 March 2003
22	9	Doktorspiele (Playing doctor)	18 March 2003
23	10	Alte Freunde (Old friends)	25 March 2003
24	11	Trauerspiel (Tragedy)	1 April 2003
25	12	Knastbruder (Jailbird)	8 April 2003
26	13	Singdrosseln (Song thrushes)	15 April 2003

Season 3
Number (whole)	Number (Season)	Original title	First broadcast
27	1	Hochzeitsglocken (Wedding bells)	6 January 2004
28	2	Lebendig begraben (Buried alive)	13 January 2004
29	3	Millionenerbin (Inheritress of millions)	20 January 2004
30	4	Die falsche Nonne (The bogus nun)	27 January 2004
31	5	Trojanisches Pferd (Trojan Horse)	10 February 2004
32	6	Blinder Passagier (Stowaway)	17 February 2004
33	7	Ratespiel (Guessing game)	24 February 2004
34	8	Notquartier (Emergency shelter)	2 March 2004
35	9	Seitensprung (Escapade)	9 March 2004
36	10	Eisprinzessin (Ice princess)	16 March 2004
37	11	Rabenmutter (Cruel mother)	23 March 2004
38	12	Schreckschuss (Warning shot)	30 March 2004
39	13	Gottesurteil (Judgement of god)	6 April 2004

Season 4
Number (whole)	Number (Season)	Original title	First broadcast
40	1	Zwei kleine Italiener (Two little Italians)	4 January 2005
41	2	Letzte Vorstellung (Last show)	11 January 2005
42	3	Traumfrau (Dreamgirl)	18 January 2005
43	4	Alte Wunden (Old sores)	25 January 2005
44	5	Zuckerbrot und Peitsche (Carrot and stick)	1 February 2005
45	6	Schuss in den Ofen (Lead ballon)	8 February 2005
46	7	Alles unter Kontrolle (All is under control)	15 February 2005
47	8	Bis aufs Mark (Marrow-deep)	22 February 2005
48	9	Geniestreich (Masterstroke)	1 March 2005
49	10	Klassentreffen (School reunion)	8 March 2005
50	11	Rache-Engel (Avenging angel)	15 March 2005
51	12	Stammhalter (Son and heir)	22 March 2005
52	13	Simsalabim (Hey presto!)	29 March 2005

Season 5
Number (whole)	Number (Season)	Original title	First broadcast
53	1	Hänsel und Gretel (Hansel and Gretel)	3 January 2006
54	2	Alarmstufe Eins (Red alert)	10 January 2006
55	3	Schwarzes Schaf (Black sheep)	17 January 2006
56	4	Wenn Gott will (If God wills)	24 January 2006
57	5	Vaterfreuden (Joys of fatherhood)	31 January 2006
58	6	Geldrausch (Money fever)	7 February 2006
59	7	Planspiele (Business Games)	14 February 2006
60	8	Ungebetener Gast (Uninvited guest)	28 February 2006
61	9	Verletzte Gefühle (Wounded feelings)	7 March 2006
62	10	Held des Tages (Hero of the hour)	14 March 2006
63	11	Rotkäppchen (Red Riding Hood)	21 March 2006
64	12	Elternlos (Parentless)	28 March 2006
65	13	Ende gut – alles gut (All's well that ends well)	4 April 2006

Season 6
Number (whole)	Number (Season)	Original title	First broadcast
66	1	Hanna von Orleans (Hanna of Arc)	23 January 2007
67	2	Der allerletzte Zeuge (The very last witness)	30 January 2007
68	3	Letzte Klappe (Last slate)	6 February 2007
69	4	Lottokönig (Lotto king)	13 February 2007
70	5	Neue Frau (New Woman)	20 February 2007
71	6	Unschuld vom Lande (Naive country girl)	27 February 2007
72	7	Madonnenfieber (Madonna fever)	6 March 2007
73	8	Zeichen und Wunder (Signs and wonders)	13 March 2007
74	9	Mordgelüste (Bloodlust)	20 March 2007
75	10	Wunder dauern länger (Wonders take longer)	27 March 2007
76	11	Turmbau zu Babel (Tower of Babel)	3 April 2007
77	12	Katzenjammer (Hangover)	10 April 2007
78	13	Nackte Tatsachen (Bare facts)	24 April 2007

Season 7
Number (whole)	Number (Season)	Original title	First broadcast
79	1	Am seidenen Faden (Hang by a thread)	8 January 2008
80	2	Schwere Geburt (Take some doing)	15 January 2008
81	3	Dicke Brummer (Thick bluebottle)	22 January 2008
82	4	Waisenkind (Orphan)	5 February 2008
83	5	Wehret den Anfängen (Nip it in the bud)	13 February 2008
84	6	Volltreffer (Bull's eye)	19 February 2008
85	7	Schatzsucher (Treasure Hunter)	26 March 2008
86	8	Dicke Luft (Trouble's brewing)	4 March 2008
87	9	Zug nach Nirgendwo (Train to nowhere)	11 March 2008
88	10	Alte Wunden (Old Sores)	18 March 2008
89	11	Teuflisches Spiel (Fiendish game)	25 March 2008
90	12	Auf Biegen und Brechen (By hook or crook)	1 April 2008
91	13	Stehaufmännchen (Roly-poly)	8 April 2008

Season 8
Number (whole)	Number (Season)	Original title	First broadcast
92	1	Liebestöter (Passion killers)	17 February 2009
93	2	Ausgebrannt (Burnt-out)	24 February 2009
94	3	Bei Nacht und Nebel (In the dead of night)	3 March 2009
95	4	Mein ist die Rache (The revenge is mine)	10 March 2009
96	5	Der letzte Strohhalm (The last straw)	17 March 2009
97	6	Zwei Fliegen mit einer Klappe (Two birds with one stone)	24 March 2009
98	7	Glück im Unglück (Luck under circumstances)	31 March 2009
99	8	Künstlerpech (Hard luck)	7 April 2009
100	9	Die große Liebe (The great love)	14 April 2009
101	10	Abschied für immer (Fare-well forever)	28 April 2009
102	11	Zwergschule (One-room School)	5 May 2009
103	12	Wohltäter der Menschheit (Benefactor of mankind)	12 May 2009
104	13	Toter Mann (Dead man)	19 May 2009

Season 9
Number (whole)	Number (Season)	Original title	First broadcast
105	1	Karten lügen doch (Cards do lie)	26 January 2010
106	2	Findelkind (Foundling)	2 February 2010
107	3	Fehltritt mit Folgen (Lapse with consequences)	16 February 2010
108	4	Böses Erwachen (Rude awakening)	2 March 2010
109	5	Schnaps-Idee (Wet idea)	9 March 2010
110	6	Goldrausch (Gold fever)	16 March 2010
111	7	Schocktherapie (Shock treatment)	24 March 2010
112	8	Gardinenpredigt (Curtain lecture)	30 March 2010
113	9	Total Cool	13 April 2010
114	10	Jugendsünden (Peccadillo)	20 April 2010
115	11	Duell der Giganten (Duel of the giants)	27 April 2010
116	12	Falsche Kamille (Wild camomile)	4 May 2010
117	13	Liebe hoch drei (Love cubed)	11 May 2010

Season 10
Number (whole)	Number (Season)	Original title	First broadcast
118	1	Jung gefreit (Married young)	15 February 2011
119	2	Wunderkinder (Prodigies)	22 February 2011
120	3	Reifeleistung (Great accomplishment))	8 March 2011
121	4	Liebe auf Raten (Love in installments)	15 March 2011
122	5	Baby Blues	22 March 2011
123	6	Liebesbrief (Love letter)	29 March 2011
124	7	Pferdetherapie (Horse therapy	5 April 2011
125	8	Romeo und Romeo (Romeo and Romeo)	12 April 2011
126	9	Heiße Ware (Hot commodities)	19 April 2011
127	10	Kreuzweise (Crosswise)	3 May 2011
128	11	Super Duper	10 May 2011
129	12	Kuckucks-Ei (Cuckoo's egg)	17 May 2011
130	13	Feld, Wald und Wiese (Field, forest and meadow)	24 May 2011

Season 11
Number (whole)	Number (Season)	Original title	First broadcast
131	1	Höhere Instanz (Higher authority)	10 January 2012
132	2	Lebenslüge (Living a lie)	17 January 2012
133	3	Grüße aus dem Jenseits (Greetings from the beyond)	24 January 2012
134	4	Blutige Anfänger (Greenhorns)	31 January 2012
135	5	Piratensender (Pirate station)	14 February 2012
136	6	Herzensbrecher (Heartbreaker)	21 February 2012
137	7	Geldadel (Financial aristocracy)	28 February 2012
138	8	Gott oder die Welt (God or the world)	6 March 2012
139	9	Peter Pan	13 March 2012
140	10	Soldatenbraut (Soldier's bride)	20 March 2012
141	11	Sorgenkind (Problem child)	27 March 2012
142	12	Bis aufs Blut (To the blood)	3 April 2012
143	13	Ende der Fahnenstange (End of the road)	10 April 2012

Season 12
Number (whole)	Number (Season)	Original title	First broadcast
144	1	Liebe, was ist das? (Love, what's that?)	8 January 2013
145	2	Kleines Genie (Little genius)	15 January 2013
146	3	Glückspilz (Lucky duck)	22 January 2013
147	4	Geheimcode (Secret code)	29 January 2013
148	5	Rotkäppchen (Red Riding Hood)	5 February 2013
149	6	Dummer Zufall (Unhappy coincidence)	12 February 2013
150	7	Der allerletzte Wille (The very last will)	19 February 2013
151	8	Liebe inbegriffen (Love included)	5 March 2013
152	9	Kain und Abel (Cain and Abel)	12 March 2013
153	10	Flieg, Engelchen, flieg (Fly, little angel, fly)	19 March 2013
154	11	Schmutzige Hände (Dirty hands)	2 April 2013
155	12	Das letzte Wort (The last word))	9 April 2013
156	13	Nackte Tatsachen (Bare facts)	23 April 2013

Season 13
Number (whole)	Number (Season)	Original title	First broadcast
157	1	Die Wege des Herrn (God's moves)	4 March 2014
158	2	Feuer unterm Dach (Fire under the roof)	11 March 2014
159	3	Ärger auf Rezept (Trouble on prescription)	18 March 2014
160	4	Lösegeld (Ransom)	25 March 2014
161	5	Vollgas (Full Throttle)	1 April 2014
162	6	Die Stimme des Herrn (The Voice of the lord)	8 April 2014
163	7	Wahre Liebe (True Love)	22 April 2014
164	8	Hoffen und Bangen (Hope and trepidation)	29 April 2014
165	9	Neues Leben (New Life)	6 May 2014
166	10	Liebesgeflüster (Sweet nothings)	13 May 2014
167	11	Gesucht und gefunden (Searched and found)	20 May 2014
168	12	Zivilcourage (Civil courage)	27 May 2014
169	13	Wort für Wort (Verbatim)	3 June 2014

Season 14
Number (whole)	Number (Season)	Original title	First broadcast
170	1	Schwein gehabt (Stroke of Luck)	6 January 2015
171	2	Sonnenschein (Sunshine)	13 January 2015
172	3	Echte Freunde (Real Friends)	20 January 2015
173	4	Nicht ohne meine Tochter (Not without my daughter)	27 January 2015
174	5	Pantoffelheld (Henpecked Husband)	3 February 2015
175	6	Wettlauf mit der Zeit (Race Against the Clock)	10 February 2015
176	7	Weg ins Licht (Road to the Light)	17 February 2015
177	8	Der Maibaum (Maypole)	24 February 2015
178	9	Miss Kaltenthal	10 March 2015
179	10	Bloßgestellt (Exposed)	17 March 2015
180	11	Mutterliebe (Mother's Love)	31 March 2015
181	12	Einfach Liebe (Simply Love)	14 April 2015
182	13	Glück auf vier Pfoten (Luck on Four Paws)	21 April 2015

Season 15
Number (whole)	Number (Season)	Original title	First broadcast
183	1	Ein Mann zu viel (One Man too Much)	19 January 2016
184	2	Faustpfand (Dead Pledge)	26 January 2016
185	3	Bauer in Not (Farmer in Need)	2 February 2016
186	4	Mutter vermisst (Missed Mother)	16 February 2016
187	5	Wirbel um Alice (Big Fuss about Alice)	23 February 2016
188	6	Milde Gaben (Doles)	1 March 2016
189	7	Geschenk der Liebe (Lovesend)	8 March 2016
190	8	Gärtners Frust (Frustration of the Gardener)	15 March 2016
191	9	Wunder gibt es immer wieder (Wonders Never Cease)	22 March 2016
192	10	Erste große Liebe (First Big Love)	5 April 2016
193	11	Superheld (Superhero)	12 April 2016
194	12	Familienbande (Family Ties)	26 April 2016
195	13	Geschenk des Himmels (Godsend)	3 May 2016

Season 16
Number (whole)	Number (Season)	Original title	First broadcast
196	1	Junggesellenabschied (Bachelor Party)	2 May 2017
197	2	Krank vor Langeweile (Sick of Boredom)	9 May 2017
198	3	Maja will ins Kloster (Maja And The Convent)	16 May 2017
199	4	Der große Oswald (The Great Oswald)	23 May 2017
200	5	Falsche Hoffnungen (Deceitful Hopes)	30 May 2017
201	6	Meinhardts letzter Wille (Testament of Meinhardt)	6 June 2017
202	7	Hoch hinaus (Flying High)	13 June 2017
203	8	Platzverweis (Dismissal)	20 June 2017
204	9	Drunter und drüber (Higgledy-Piggeldy)	27 June 2017
205	10	Fremder Mann, was nun? (Stranger, what's now?)	4 July 2017
206	11	Falsche Diagnose (Misdiagnosis)	11 July 2017
207	12	Altes Geheimnis (Ancient Secret)	18 July 2017
208	13	Alles oder nichts (All or None)	25 July 2017

Season 17
Number (whole)	Number (Season)	Original title	First broadcast
209	1	Brautalarm (Bride Alert)	9 January 2018
210	2	Schlimmer Verdacht (Bad Suspicion)	16 January 2018
211	3	Gewissenskonflikte (Inner Conflicts)	23 January 2018
212	4	Ausgebacken (Baked Through)	30 January 2018
213	5	Ausgeträumt (Dream's over!)	13 February 2018
214	6	Im Falschen Körper (Within the Wrong Body)	20 February 2018
215	7	Vergeben und Vergessen (Forgiven and Forgotten)	27 February 2018
216	8	Aus die Maus (Over and Done!)	6 March 2018
217	9	Zwei Väter (Two Fathers)	13 March 2018
218	10	Die Letzte Fahrt (The Last Ride)	20 March 2018
219	11	Schuldgefühle (Compuction)	27 March 2018
220	12	Nachtgestalten (Nightshapes)	3 April 2018
221	13	So ein Hundeleben (A Dog's Life)	10 April 2018

Season 18
Number (whole)	Number (Season)	Original title	First broadcast
222	1	Dunkle Wolken (Dark Clouds)	26 March 2019
223	2	Ausgebüxt (Runaway)	9 April 2019
224	3	Außenseiter (Maverick)	16 April 2019
225	4	Der Schatz von Kaltenthal (The Treasure of Kaltenthal)	30 April 2019
226	5	Späte Versöhnung (Late Reconciliation)	14 May 2019
227	6	Liebe auf Bewährung (Love on Parole)	21 May 2019
228	7	Zeichen der Zeit (Signs of the Time)	28 May 2019
229	8	Wunderheiler (Faith Healer)	4 June 2019
230	9	Torschlusspanik (Last Minute Panic)	11 June 2019
231	10	Hannas Entführung (Abducktion of Hanna)	18 June 2019
232	11	Doppelgängerin (Doppelganger)	25 June 2019
233	12	Liebe geht durch den Magen (The Way to Someone's Heart is Through His Stomach)	2 July 2019
234	13	Zweite Chance (Second Chance)	9 July 2019

Season 19
Number (whole)	Number (Season)	Original title	First broadcast
235	1	Hochzeitswahn (Wedding-Mania)	7 January 2020
236	2	Handicaps	14 January 2020
237	3	Nervensäge (Nag)	21 January 2020
238	4	Rückschläge (Setbacks)	28 January 2020
239	5	Überraschungen (Surprises)	11 February 2020
240	6	Utas Erbe (Heritage of Uta)	18 February 2020
241	7	Loslassen (Releasing)	25 February 2020
242	8	Wunschkind (Planned Child)	10 March 2020
243	9	Zweiter Frühling (Indian Summer)	17 March 2020
244	10	Familienkrise (Family Crisis)	24 March 2020
245	11	Letzte Chance (Last Chance)	31 March 2020
246	12	Spieglein, Spieglein (Mirror, Mirror)	7 April 2020
247	13	Ausgekocht (Crafty)	14 April 2020

Season 20
Number (whole)	Number (Season)	Original title	First broadcast
248	1	Plötzlich reich (Suddenly rich)	30 March 2021
249	2	Bühnenreif (Stagy)	30 March 2021
250	3	Abflug (Take-off)	6 April 2021
251	4	Gerüchte (Rumors)	13 April 2021
252	5	Liebe kennt kein Alter (Love Doesn't Know Ages)	20 April 2021
253	6	Gnadenbrot (Charity)	27 April 2021
254	7	Positiv (Positive)	4 May 2021
255	8	Pechvogel (Jinx)	11 May 2021
256	9	Späte Wahrheit (Late Truth)	18 May 2021
257	10	Gefährliche Liebe (Dangerous Love)	25 May 2021
258	11	Doppelleben (Dual Life)	1 June 2021
259	12	Selbstvertrauen (Confidence)	8 June 2021
260	13	Hindernisse des Herzens (Barriers of the Heart)	15 June 2021

=== Christmas-Specials ===
Until 2014 four feature-length Christmas specials of Um Himmels Willen were produced.

==== Um Himmels Willen — Weihnachten in Kaltenthal ====
(English: Christmas at Kaltenthal, first aired: 23 December 2008) Just before Christmas mayor Wöller receives an invitation from the Vatican, he asks sister Hanna to accompany him. In Rome it turns out that the invitation was not for a private audience with the pope, but for an event at St. Peter's Basilica. Wöller and Hanna are disappointed and want to travel back to Germany straightaway, but a general strike bars them from this. Meanwhile, the other nuns of Kaltenthal are preparing the yearly children's Christmas party, and mother superior Elisabeth Reuter gets a surprising visit from her predecessor.

==== Um Himmels Willen — Weihnachten unter Palmen ====
(English: Christmas under palms, first aired: 25 December 2010) Mayor Wöller wants to escape from the Christmas confusion by booking a Mediterranean cruise. Hardly on board he gets shocked, because sisters Hanna, Agnes and Felicitas from cloister Kaltenthal are on the same ship. They received the crusade as a gift, and have in mind to collect donations for a Kaltenthal family in need underway. The nuns meet Felix, son of the ship's owner Max Brockmann. The boy lost his mother by an auto accident and become friends with the crew member Ursula Henning. This not sits well with the boy's father, and he fires Ursula. When Ursula gets of board at Teneriffa, Felix tries to run after her, but Hanna keeps him off and tries to find a solution for this trying situation. Meanwhile, Wöller got to know Isabella Kegel, who is born in Kaltenthal and he wants to marry her on board promptly, but Isabella ditches him right before the wedding altar. Wöller has dumped on Isabella years before when he was looking for a wife, because of her overweight. In fact that she reduced nearly 30 kilograms Wöller don't recognize her on board of the cruise ship.

==== Um Himmels Willen — Mission unmöglich ====
(English: Mission impossible, first aired: 20 December 2012) Mayor of Kaltenthal and car seller Wolfgang Wöller, sold the majority of his second-hand cars to Nigeria and did advance payment thatfore. It transpired fastly that he was fooled by a fraud. Cause of the fact, that he took money out of the public purse of Kaltenthal a political scandal is threaten. To avoid this, he travels to Nigeria, accompanied by sister Hanna from cloister Kaltenthal. Hanna would like to find there Doctor Mabenga, fired physician of Kaltenthal hospital, who traveled to Nigeria with his daughter after an argument with his wife. Wöller and Hanna are visiting sister Lotte, Hannas predecessor, who now leads a mission station in Nigeria.

==== Um Himmels Willen – Das Wunder von Fatima ====
(English: The Wonder of Fátima, first aired: 25 December 2014) Sister Hanna, Mayor Wöller and the wealthy widow Sonja Berger together travel to Fátima in Portugal to find the missing early love of Mrs. Berger, Thomas Breitner. Mayor Wöller, who seems uncommonly helpful and generous, again has a selfish hidden agenda: he considers the wealthy Mrs. Berger as the legendary "Angel of Kaltenthal", who favors homeless persons with anonymous donations. For reasons of re-election he has repurposed donations of 50.000 Euros, which are originally dedicated for war orphans, to the gun club of Kaltenthal, and has to fill this gap of money urgently. Therefore he hopes for the goodwill of the rich widow.

== Awards ==
- 2002: Goldene Europa for Jutta Speidel and Fritz Wepper
- 2003: Deutscher Fernsehpreis in the category „Best Actor of a Series“ for Fritz Wepper
- 2006: Bayerischer Fernsehpreis in the category „Best Actress of a Series“ for Jutta Speidel
- 2006: Bayerischer Fernsehpreis in the category „Best Actor of a Series“ for Fritz Wepper
- 2010: Goldene Henne in the category „Acting“ for Janina Hartwig and Fritz Wepper
- 2010: Bambi, audience choice as the most popular television series

== See also ==
- Wilsberg
- Das Traumschiff
- Stolberg
