= Die Brücke (film) =

1959 film

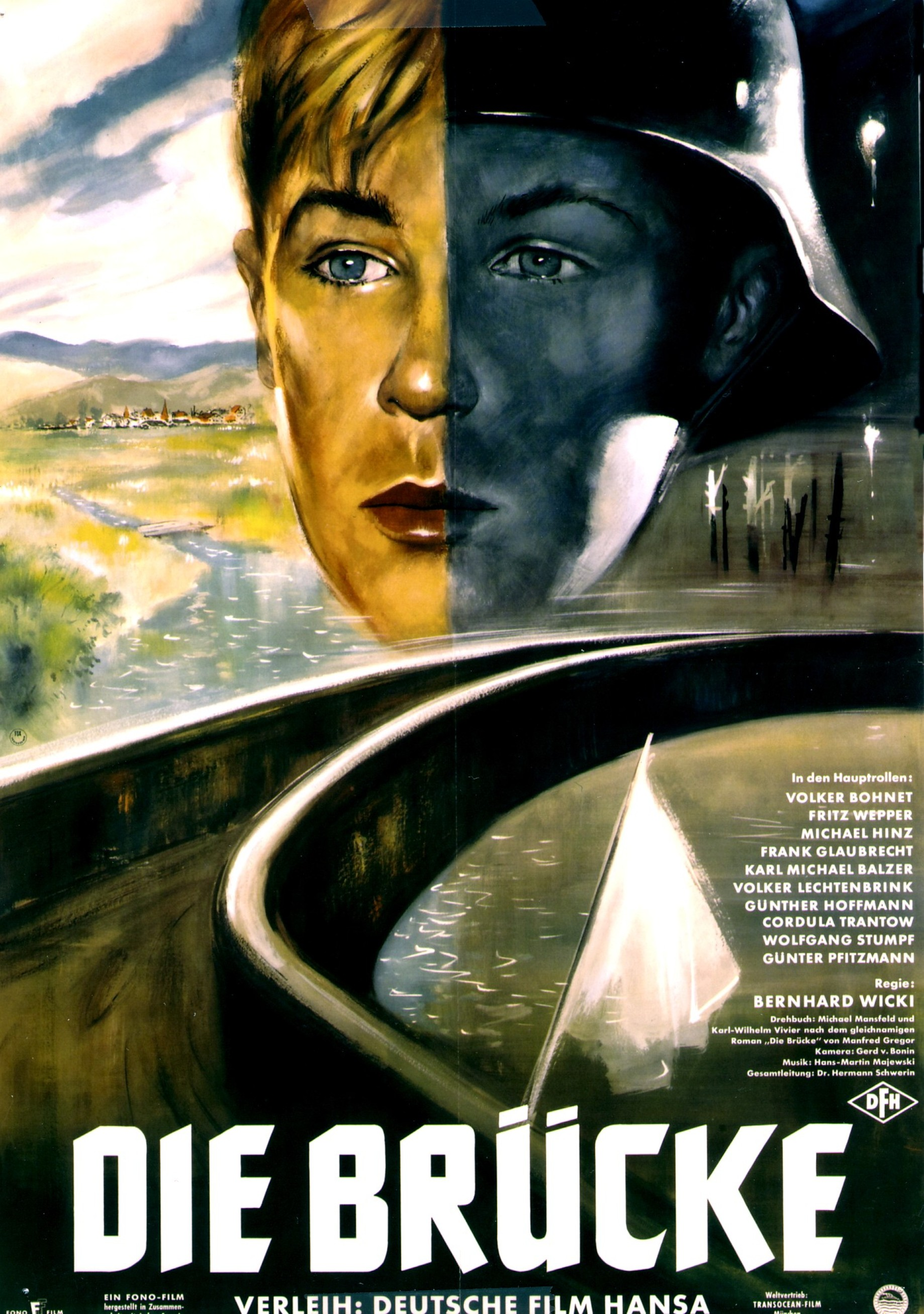
- Film poster by Helmuth Ellgaard
- Directed by: Bernhard Wicki
- Written by: Manfred Gregor (novel); Karl-Wilhelm Vivier; Michael Mansfeld; Bernhard Wicki
- Produced by: Hermann Schwerin; Jochen Schwerin
- Starring: Folker Bohnet; Fritz Wepper; Michael Hinz; Frank Glaubrecht; Karl Michael Balzer; Volker Lechtenbrink; Günther Hoffmann
- Cinematography: Gerd von Bonin
- Edited by: Carl Otto Bartning
- Music by: Hans-Martin Majewski
- Distributed by: Deutsche Film Hansa
- Release date: 22 October 1959
- Running time: 105 minutes
- Country: West Germany
- Language: German

Die Brücke (German pronunciation: [diː ˈbʁʏkə], "The Bridge") is a 1959 West German anti-war film directed by Austrian filmmaker Bernhard Wicki. It is based on the 1958 novel of the same name by journalist and writer Gregor Dorfmeister (published under the pseudonym Manfred Gregor). The story was based on an actual event, upon the personal report of a surviving veteran who in his own youth experienced a similar situation in World War II.

The film was timely in West Germany as the Bundeswehr had only recently been created in 1955 with conscription in Germany beginning in 1956. It received several international prizes, notably the Golden Globe Award for Best Foreign Language Film and the National Board of Review Award for Best Foreign Language Film, also a nomination for the Academy Award for Best Foreign Language Film.

== Plot ==
In the closing days of World War II, a small German town comes into focus as U.S. Army forces advance in its direction. In the town's school, seven boys — each about 16 years old — are oblivious to the seriousness and dangers of the war, feeling excitement about how close the fighting is getting to them, and they live their lives as normally as they can, though they are overshadowed with personal problems. Karl, who has a crush on his hairstylist father's young assistant, is shocked to see them in an intimate situation; Klaus is oblivious to the affections of his classmate Franziska; and Walter is deeply resentful of his father, the local Nazi Party Ortsgruppenleiter, who has chosen to save his own skin under the pretense of an important Volkssturm meeting. Jürgen is the son of a German officer who has been killed in action, and hopes to live up to his father's example.

Unexpectedly, the boys are recruited into a local army unit, but after only one day in the barracks, the commanding officers receive news that the Americans are approaching, and the garrison is called out. As they prepare to move out, the Kompaniechef, who has been asked by the boys' teacher to keep them out of action, arranges for the youths to be placed in 'defense' of the local bridge (which is strategically unimportant, and which is to be blown up anyway to spare the town the direct effects of the war), under the command of a veteran Unteroffizier.

Soon after the boys have settled in, the Unteroffizier leaves to get some coffee and inform the demolition squad, but on his way he is mistaken for a deserter by a Feldgendarmerie patrol. He attempts to escape and is shot, leaving the boys alone on the bridge and with no contact with their unit. They remain guarding the bridge even after they are confronted by a retreating convoy of trucks carrying wounded and maimed soldiers, desperate to escape the battlefront. Since the boys have not received orders to retreat, they decide to hold their position under the code: 'A soldier who defends just one square meter of ground defends Germany'.

Dawn comes, and with it an American fighter plane which fires its machine guns at the bridge, killing the youngest of their number, Sigi, who refused to take cover because he had previously been teased for his alleged lack of bravery. Shocked by Sigi's death, the boys take up their positions to defend the bridge against a trio of American tanks and their infantry support. Walter even manages to destroy two tanks with Panzerfausts, but one by one the boys are killed, shaking their comrades with the true horrors of war. One of the most memorable scenes is when an American soldier who asks the boys to cease fire has his belly shot open by Karl (who is simultaneously killed by a machine gun burst himself) and the man dies screaming in agony, while Klaus begs Karl (being unaware that he is dead) to finish him off. Upon realizing that Karl is dead, Klaus goes mad and runs headlong into the American fire.

In the end, the last remaining tank retreats, followed by the surviving infantrymen. The boys have "done their duty for Führer and Fatherland" by preventing the Americans from crossing, but only Hans and Albert are left. A German demolition squad finally arrives, and the Feldwebel in command immediately begins to criticize them, calling them nincompoops and would-be-heroes. Realizing that his friends have died in vain, Hans goes mad with disbelief and despair, threatening the engineer with his rifle, and as the Feldwebel in turn readies his gun, he is shot from behind by Albert. The remaining engineers withdraw with a final burst of submachine gun fire that kills Hans, leaving only a traumatized Albert to return home.

A line inserted just before the end credits soberly reads: 'This event occurred on April 27, 1945. It was so unimportant that it was never mentioned in any war communique.'

== Cast ==
- Folker Bohnet as Hans Scholten
- Fritz Wepper as Albert Mutz
- Michael Hinz as Walter Forst
- Frank Glaubrecht as Jürgen Borchert
- Karl Michael Balzer as Karl Horber
- Volker Lechtenbrink as Klaus Hager
- Günther Hoffmann as Sigi Bernhard
- Cordula Trantow as Franziska
- Wolfgang Stumpf as Studienrat Stern, their teacher
- Günter Pfitzmann as Unteroffizier Heilmann
- Heinz Spitzner as Hauptmann Fröhlich
- Siegfried Schürenberg as Oberstleutnant Bütov
- Edith Schultze-Westrum as Frau Bernhard, Sigi's mother
- Ruth Hausmeister as Frau Mutz, Albert's mother
- Eva Vaitl as Frau Borchert, Jürgen's mother
- Hans Elwenspoek as Ortsgruppenleiter Forst, Walter's father
- Trude Breitschopf as Frau Forst, Walter's mother
- Klaus Hellmold as Herr Horber, Karl's father
- Edeltraut Elsner as Barbara, Horber's maid
- Inge Benz as Sigrun, sports teacher
- Georg Lehn as the soldier from demolition squad
- Loriot as Stabsfeldwebel Zeisler
- Buck Henry as voice of American soldier
- Peter Fernandez as voice of American soldier

== Reception ==
The film won its director Bernhard Wicki international attention, which resulted in his participation in co-directing the movie The Longest Day (1962).

Die Brücke won four awards at the German Film Awards in 1960, including Best Feature Film and Best Direction, and was given a special award in 1989 for the "40th Anniversary of the Federal Republic of Germany". It also received several international prizes, notably the Golden Globe Award for Best Foreign Language Film and the National Board of Review Award for Best Foreign Language Film. It received the Best Film award and the FIPRESCI prize at the Mar del Plata Film Festival. It was also nominated for the Academy Award for Best Foreign Language Film, but lost to the French film Black Orpheus.

The film was released in the United States in 1961 by Allied Artists.

== Home media ==
Die Brücke was released on DVD in Germany in 1999 by Kinowelt Home Entertainment. A Special Edition was released in 2007. Both are in German only.

The Bridge/Die Brücke was released on DVD in the UK, by Digital Classics DVD, on 19 October 2009 with English subtitles and a bonus film about director Bernhard Wicki.

The film was issued in the US in June 2015 on Blu-ray and DVD by The Criterion Collection.

== Remake ==
A remake of the film for television was produced and premiered on the German television station Pro7 on September 29, 2008. Actors in the production included François Goeske and Franka Potente. It was not well received by critics, who said that it fell far short of the original's intensity.

== See also ==
- List of submissions to the 32nd Academy Awards for Best Foreign Language Film
- List of German submissions for the Academy Award for Best Foreign Language Film
