= Die Brücke (novel) =

1958 novel by Gregor Dorfmeister

- Author: Gregor Dorfmeister (under the pseudonym Manfred Gregor)
- Language: German
- Genre: anti-war
- Published: 1958 (Heyne Bücher) (German)
- Publication place: West Germany

Die Brücke (German pronunciation: [diː ˈbʁʏkə], "The Bridge") is a West German anti-war novel written by Gregor Dorfmeister, under the pen name of Manfred Gregor and published in 1958 by Heyne Bücher.

The book is a partly autobiographical account of forced youth service in the Volkssturm (people's army) late in Second World War. When the narrator and six of his schoolmates are conscripted into service during the final days of World War II, he is the only one to survive and tell their story.

Two German-language film versions of the novel were made, one in 1959 by Austrian director Bernhard Wicki and one in 2008, a television film by Wolfgang Panzer.
