= Geld.Macht.Liebe =

- Country of origin: Germany

Geld.Macht.Liebe is a German television series.

== See also ==
- List of German television series
