= Salvatorkirche =

Church in Munich, Germany

Coordinates: 48°08′30″N 11°34′29″E

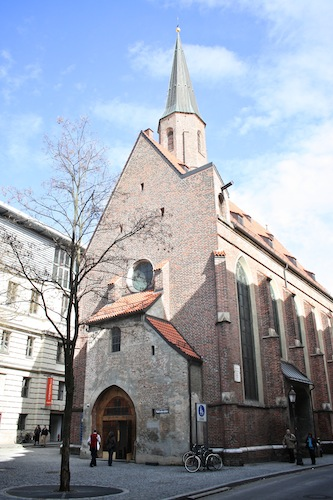
Salvatorkirche

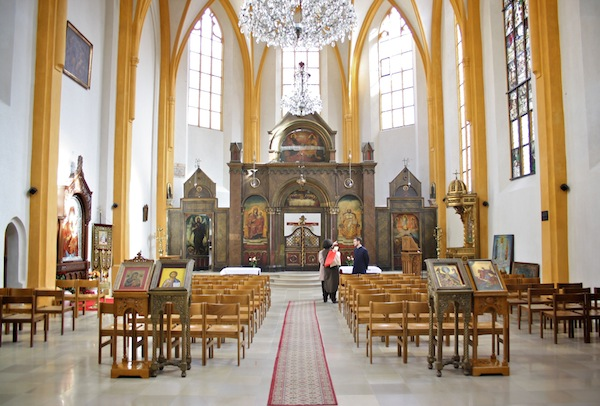
Inside view

Salvatorkirche (Church of the Savior) is a gothic church in Munich, Germany, the former cemetery church of the Frauenkirche (Cathedral of Our Blessed Lady). Since 1829 the church has been used by Greek Orthodox Christians and it was the headquarters of the Metropolitan of Germany and Exarch of Central Europe. It is called "Transfiguration of the Savior" by the Greek Orthodox community.

It was built in late Gothic style in 1493, later it was used as a storage. Leo von Klenze renovated the church for the use of the Greek community in Munich and designed also the Ikonostasis. The exterior was reconstructed in a gothic style, baroque parts were removed. During the Nazi period in Germany the famous mathematician Constantin Carathéodory worked as a church council.
