= Fritz Wepper =

German actor (1941–2024)

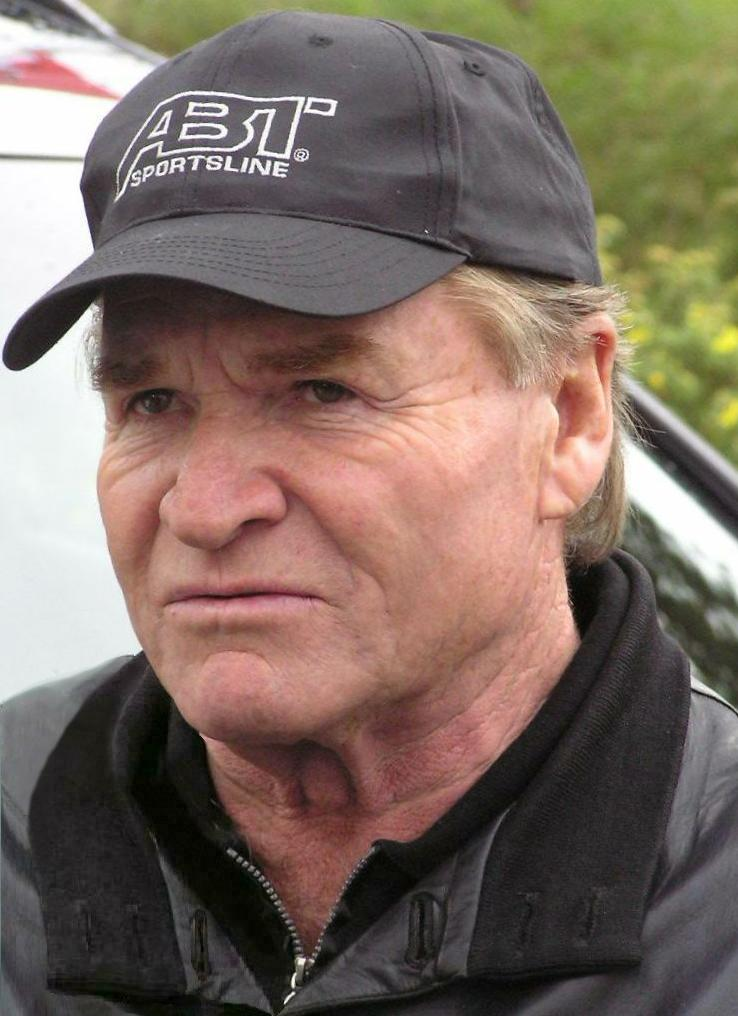
- Wepper in 2006
- Born: 17 August 1941; Munich, Gau Munich-Upper Bavaria, Germany
- Died: 25 March 2024 (aged 82); Munich, Bavaria, Germany
- Years active: 1952–2021
- Spouse: Angela von Morgen (m. 1979; died 2019) Susanne Kellermann (m. 2020)
- Children: 2, including Sophie
- Relatives: Elmar Wepper (brother)

Fritz Wepper (17 August 1941 – 25 March 2024) was a German film and television actor. He is best known for his role as Inspector Harry Klein in the long-running crime series Derrick (1974–1998). Wepper is also remembered for his roles in the films Cabaret (1972) and The Bridge (1959) and as Mayor Wöller in the TV series Um Himmels Willen (2002–2021).

== Life and career ==
Fritz Wepper was born as the son of a lawyer who was missing in action as a soldier in Poland in 1945. He started his acting career in a production of Peter Pan at the age of eleven. He got his first important film role in Tischlein deck dich, a film adaption of the Brothers Grimm fairytale The Wishing Table. His breakthrough role was as a young soldier in Bernhard Wicki's anti-war film Die Brücke (1959) which won the Golden Globe Award for Best Foreign Language Film. Wepper kept his popularity with German audiences into adulthood and appeared in several notable German films of the 1960s.

In 1972, he played Fritz Wendel, a German Jew passing as a Christian, in the Oscar-winning film version of Cabaret. Wepper's Wendel marries Marisa Berenson's character, a wealthy Jewish heiress, as Nazi power grows inexorably in Europe.

His character Harry Klein, the assistant in the long-running crime series Derrick, became a cult figure all over the world. He played this role between 1974 and 1998 in 281 episodes of Derrick. Before playing Klein in Derrick he portrayed the same character on the popular television drama Der Kommissar (1969–1976) from the series' start until 1974 when he was transferred to Derrick. Harry Klein was replaced by his brother Erwin (played by Fritz Wepper's real-life brother, Elmar). The brothers appeared together in the television series Zwei Brüder (1994–2000), playing a pair of different brothers hunting criminals and solve difficult cases. From 2002 until the show's cancellation in 2021, Fritz Wepper played the sneaky and sly, but ultimately good-hearted, Mayor Wolfgang Wöller in the TV series Um Himmels Willen, which was for many years one of the most-watched German television series (with some 7.2 million views per episode).

== Personal life ==
Wepper married Angela von Morgen in 1979. His daughter, Sophie is also an actress, they appeared together in the crime series Mord in bester Gesellschaft between 2007 and 2017. Wepper made headlines in the yellow press when he left von Morgen for the far younger Susanne Kellermann (born 1974) in 2009. He has a daughter (born 2012) from the relationship with Kellermann, but later returned to his wife. Von Morgen died in January 2019, aged 76, following a cerebral haemorrhage. In 2020, Wepper married Susanne Kellermann.

After meeting during the filming of Cabaret in 1971, Wepper and Liza Minnelli remained close friends.

Wepper died in Munich on 25 March 2024, at the age of 82, less than six months after his brother Elmar's death.

== Selected filmography ==
- The Dark Star (1955)
- Tischlein deck dich (Table, Donkey and Stick, 1956) .... Michel mit der grünen Kappe
- Rübezahl (1957) .... (uncredited)
- Eine verrückte Familie (1957) .... Hermann Bunzel
- Zwei Matrosen auf der Alm (1958) .... Friseurlehrling
- The Crammer (1958) .... (uncredited)
- The Angel Who Pawned Her Harp (1959) .... Christian
- Die Brücke (The Bridge, 1959) .... Albert Mutz
- My Schoolfriend (1960) .... Paul (uncredited)
- Question 7 (1961) .... Heinz Dehmert – Jugendführer
- Our Town (1961, TV movie) .... George Gibbs
- Miracle of the White Stallions (1963) .... Rider Hans
- The River Line (1964) .... Philip
- Three Rooms in Manhattan (1965) .... Fabien (uncredited)
- When Night Falls on the Reeperbahn (1967) .... Till Voss
- The Doctor of St. Pauli (1968) .... Hein Jungermann
- Das Go-Go-Girl vom Blow-Up (1968) .... Peter Mertens
- Der Kommissar (1968–1974, TV series, 66 episodes) .... Harry Klein
- The Man with the Glass Eye (1969) .... Lord Bruce Sheringham
- On the Reeperbahn at Half Past Midnight (1969) .... Till Schippmann
- Slap in the Face (1970) .... Peter Terbanks (voice, uncredited)
- We'll Take Care of the Teachers (1970) .... Hubert Böhm
- The Games (1970) .... Gregorye Kovanda
- Butterflies Don't Cry (1970) .... Hans Engelmann
- Nachbarn sind zum Ärgern da (1970) .... Jürgen
- Cabaret (1972) .... Fritz Wendel
- Sie nannten ihn Krambambuli (1972) .... Momme Linnau
- Der Ehefeind (1972)
- Derrick (1974–1998, TV series, 281 episodes) .... Harry Klein
- Le Dernier Combat (The Last Battle, 1983) .... Captain
- Zwei Brüder (Two Brothers, 1994–2001, TV series, 17 episodes) .... Christoph Thaler
- Drei in fremden Betten (1996, TV movie) .... Otto König
- Die blaue Kanone (1999, TV movie) .... Harry Groß
- Murder on the Orient Express (2001, TV movie) .... Wolfgang Bouc
- Vera Brühne (The Trials of Vera B., 2001, TV movie) .... Lawyer Dr. Wallner
- Hochwürden wird Papa (2002, TV movie) .... Oskar Lindner
- Um Himmels Willen (2002–2021, TV series, 264 episodes) .... Wolfgang Wöller
- Männer im gefährlichen Alter (2004, TV movie) .... Henry Malek
- Derrick – Die Pflicht ruft! (2004) .... Harry Klein (voice)
- Ein Engel namens Hans-Dieter (2004, TV movie) .... Hans-Dieter Anhäuser
- Rikets Røst (2007, TV series, 3 episodes) .... Harry Klein
- Ein unverbesserlicher Dickkopf (2007, TV movie) .... Balthasar Pelkofer
- Mord in bester Gesellschaft (2007–2017, TV series, 15 episodes) .... Dr. Wendelin Winter
- Unser Mann im Süden (2008, TV series, 4 episodes) .... Konsul Heinrich Hammerstein
- Baby frei Haus (2009, TV movie) .... Kurt Schollwer
- Lindburgs Fall (2011, TV movie) .... Peter Lindburg
