= Cordy Millowitsch =

German actress and singer (1890–1977)

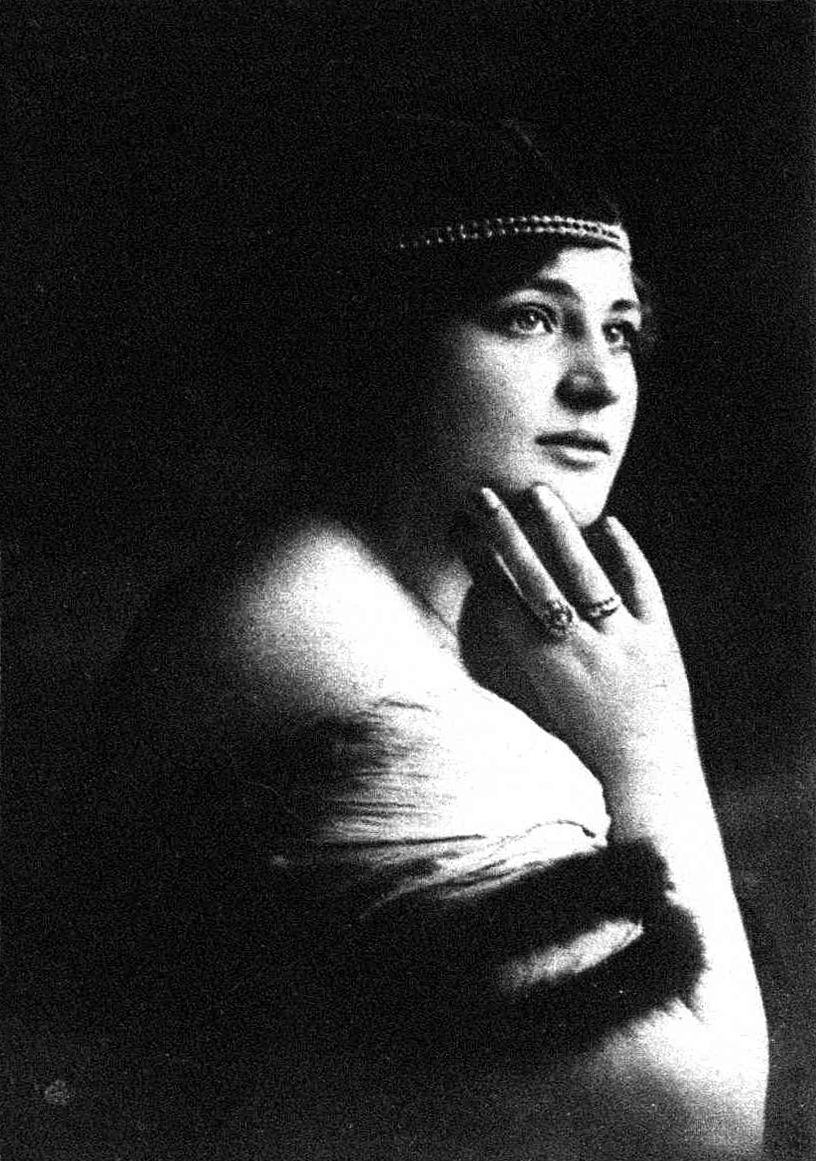
- Millowitsch c. 1916
- Born: Cordy Dugne or Dugue; April 8, 1890; Cologne, Germany
- Died: June 14, 1977 (aged 87); Berlin, Germany
- Occupations: Actress, singer
- Known for: Operetta performances, early German cinema
- Notable work: Die Tragödie auf Schloß Rottersheim, Jeremias, Peter der Große, Trenck

Cordy Millowitsch (8 April 1890 – 14 June 1977) was a German actress and singer.

== Biography ==
Her real name was Cordy Dugne or Dugue, and she was born in Cologne, Germany. After her arrival in Berlin Millowitsch received vocal training and her stage career gained momentum. As an operetta singer, she achieved her first successes before the First World War at the Metropol-Theater, performing alongside popular artists of the time such as Joseph Giampietro and Guido Thielscher.

From November 1915 to March 1918, she worked in Vienna and played the role of Paula Rottersheim in the drama Die Tragödie auf Schloß Rottersheim, a film by Jakob Fleck and Luise Kolm, which marked her cinematic debut in 1916.

In early April 1918, she traveled to Constantinople (now Istanbul). Upon returning to Berlin, Cordy Millowitsch performed in several films in the early 1920s, often portraying noble characters. Thus, she played Esther, Queen of Judea, in Jeremias; Tsarina Eudoxia in Peter der Große (alongside Emil Jannings); and Empress Maria Theresa I of Austria in Trenck. However, the center of her artistic activity remained the stage, especially from 1922 onward. Thereafter, she only worked sporadically in sound films.

Millowitsch also gained experience in early German television. During the Third Reich, she appeared as Frau Arvik in the broadcast Wenn der junge Wein blüht, produced by the TV-station Fernsehsender Paul Nipkow.

No information is available about the later years of Cordy Millowitsch.

Cordy Millowitsch died in 1977 at the age of 87 in her apartment in Berlin-Wilmersdorf.

== Family ==
Cordy Millowitsch came from the family of the dyer Christian Ducque and his wife Charlotte, née Falkenstein. On 9 December 1909, she married her fellow actor Wilhelm Carl Caspar Millowitsch (1881–1952) in Cologne, a younger brother of the actor and theater director Peter Wilhelm Millowitsch (24 January 1880 – 14 January 1945). The marriage was dissolved in 1920. Through this marriage, she became the aunt of Lucy and Willy Millowitsch. Her grandnephew is the actor and theater director Peter Millowitsch, and her grandniece is the actress and veterinarian Mariele Millowitsch.

On 11 March 1922, Cordy Millowitsch married insurance director Friedrich Frankl (born 1888 in Hamburg) in Berlin. This marriage also did not last and was dissolved in 1935.

From 1939 until his death in 1975, Cordy Millowitsch was married to sales representative Hans Skowronnek.

== Filmography ==
- 1916: Die Tragödie auf Schloß Rottersheim, by Jakob Fleck and Luise Kolm
- 1917: Wenn die Liebe auf den Hund kommt, by Richard Löwenbein
- 1920: Ihr letzter Fall, by Otto Eggerth
- 1922: Jeremias, by Eugen Illés
- 1923: Peter der Große, by Dimitri Buchowetzki
- 1931: Die lustigen Weiber von Wien, by Géza von Bolváry
- 1932: Trenck, by Ernst Neubach and Heinz Paul
- 1939: Kornblumenblau, by Hermann Pfeiffer
- 1941: Mistress Moon
