= Millowitsch =

Millowitsch may refer to:

- Willy Millowitsch (1909–1999), German actor and playwright
- Peter Millowitsch (born 1949), German actor and current director of Volkstheater Millowitsch
- Mariele Millowitsch (born 1955), German actress
- Volkstheater Millowitsch, a traditional Cologne theatre
