= Lucy Millowitsch =

German actress and dramatist (1905–1990)

Lucy Haubrich-Millowitsch
- Born: Lucy Millowitsch; 8 November 1905; Chemnitz, Saxony, Germany
- Died: 21 June 1990 (aged 84); Cologne NRW, West Germany
- Occupations: Stage actress movie actress dramatist theatre co-owner and intendant
- Spouse: Josef Haubrich (1889–1961)
- Children: Karl Peter Trebbau-Millowitsch also known as Pedro Trebbau
- Parent(s): Peter Wilhelm Millowitsch (1880–1945); Käthe Planck

Lucy Millowitsch (8 November 1905 – 21 June 1990) was a German stage-actress, screen star, stage director/producer, theatre co-owner/manager and dramatist.

Later she teamed up with her brother to run the Cologne Millowitsch Theatre, which became known at the time as a venue for "popular, low-brow comedies".

== Life ==
Lucy Millowitsch was born in Chemnitz. She was born into a long-established theatrical dynasty. Michael Millowitsch, her great-great-great grandfather, had created a successful puppet theatre in Cologne as far back as the late eighteenth century. Her father was the stage actor and theatre impresario Peter Wilhelm Millowitsch (1880–1945). Her mother, born Käthe Planck, came originally from Vienna. Her father's younger sister was the stage and screen performer Cordy Millowitsch. Lucy and her younger brother Willy Millowitsch were appearing on the stage with their father from an early age. In 1936, as the German economy recovered, and after several years without a permanent home for the family theatre company, their father opened a new theatre at the "Colonia House" building, a one-time dance hall, in Cologne's Aachener Straße, where the family theater company enjoyed great public success over the next few years. Brother and sister formed an effective on-stage partnership.

During the later 1930s Lucy Millowitsch started to accept film roles. In 1939 she appeared alongside her aunt Cordy Millowitsch in Kornblumenblau ("Corn-flower Blue"). Other films in which she appeared included Trenck, der Pandur (Tremck, the Squaddie, 1940), Komödianten ("Comedians"), 1941), Mein Leben für Irland ("My Life for Ireland", 1941) and Das große Spiel ("The Big Game", 1942). However, as the war dragged on she withdrew from her film work to concentrate on the family theatre. Her father died on 14 January 1945.

The Millowitsch Theatre was less badly damaged by Anglo-American bombing during World War II than other city venues, and on 16 September 1945 it was re-opened, at the express request of Mayor Konrad Adenauer : "Die Leute sollen wieder wat zu lachen haben!". (Note: "The people should have something to laugh about again!") The Millowitsch siblings who had formally taken over responsibility for running the theatre, relaunched the venue by staging Das Glücksmädel (loosely, "The Lucky Lass"). Public success quickly returned, and more well received productions followed.

On 27 October 1953 the NWDR (broadcasting company) transmitted a stage production of Etappenhase by Karl Bunje from the Millowitsch Theatre. It was the first time a stage production had been broadcast on German television, and across West Germany it brought nationwide recognition to the theatre and to the company. Willy and Lucy Millowitsch acquired star status as did other lead actors in the production, most notably Elsa Scholten. The 1954 production of "Das goldene Kalb" ("The Golden Calf") showcased a play written by Lucy Millowitsch herself. Despite a focus on regional diversification, between 1949 and 1990 Cologne was, by many criteria, the most important and largest home to the West German television network: since 1953 more than 100 plays have been transmitted from the city's Millowitsch Theatre, many of them received with critical and public acclaim.

From 1948 Lucy Millowitsch also featured regularly in radio dramas produced down the road at the NWDR studios and (after the NWDR was disaggregated in 1955) with WDR. One example of her radio work was the lead female role which she took, playing alongside Erich Ponto in the 1948 NWDR and the 1962 WDR radio versions of Hans Müller-Schlösser's popular drama piece "Schneider Wibbel" ("Wibbel the Tailor ").

The success of the theatre during the 1950s enabled Lucy Millowitsch to indulge her taste for international travel. In particular, she became a frequent, visitor to Venezuela, engaging in efforts to improve conditions for ethnic groups who would have been identified in Germany at that time as "indigenous Indians". Another attraction of the country was that by this time her son Karl Peter (today better known as Pedro Trebbau), by this time in his 20s, was building a career there as a zoologist. In 1960 Lucy Millowitsch married the art collector (and lawyer) Josef Haubrich on 27 April 1960. Although the two of them were both Cologners, it was in Venezuela that they met one another and in Caracas that the marriage ceremony took place. It was Haubrich's fifth (and final) marriage: he suffered a stroke and died unexpectedly in 1961.

After the death of her husband Lucy Haubrich-Millowitsch increasingly redirected her attention away from the theatre, despite still being one of West Germany's most popular television actresses. Instead her focus became her late husband's vast artistic estate. Josef Haubrich had been a shrewd and prolific collector of mostly twentieth century paintings. He told an interviewer, "I have almost never regretted buying a piece of artwork, but I have sometimes gone on regretting for years one that I did not acquire." (Note: "Ich habe fast nie bereut, ein Kunstwerk erworben zu haben, aber ich habe manchmal jahrelang bereut, eins nicht erworben zu haben.") The variety and extent of his collection powerfully corroborated that approach: The paintings acquired by Josef Haubrich while he was alive were of lasting interest to art lover after he died: today much of his collection remains on permanent display, notably as the core of the collection in the Museum Ludwig (between the cathedral and the river). In 1979 the Cologne city council even named a new city centre gallery "Josef-Haubrich-Kunsthalle". (It has subsequently been destroyed as part of a redevelopment project.)

Lucy Millowitsch died on 21 June 1990 aged 94 in Cologne. Her physical remains were placed close to the main Millowitsch family grave in the Melaten Cemetery.

The physical residua of her late husband and of his third wife, the pediatrician Alice Haubrich-Gottschalk (1892–1944) (a Jewess who died by suicide ahead of a scheduled Gestapo "questioning") had already, in 1987, been removed from their former resting place in Cologne's massive West Cemetery and placed alongside the space assigned to be occupied by those of Lucy Haubrich-Millowitsch, following her death ("Flur 72a").

== Filmography (selection) ==
- 1936: Die Unbekannte – Regie: Frank Wisbar
- 1939: Das Gewehr über – Regie: Jürgen von Alten
- 1939: Kornblumenblau – Regie: Hermann Pfeiffer
- 1940: Trenck, der Pandur – Regie: Herbert Selpin
- 1941: Mein Leben für Irland – Regie: Max W. Kimmich
- 1941: Komödianten – Regie: Georg Wilhelm Pabst
- 1942: Das große Spiel – Regie: Robert Adolf Stemmle

== Televised stage productions in Millowitsch Theatre (selection) ==
- 1953: Der Etappenhase – with Willy Millowitsch, Franz Schneider, Jakob Kauhausen
- 1954: Drei kölsche Jungens – direction and production: Willy Millowitsch, with Franz Schneider, Harald Landt
- 1954: Das goldene Kalb (as script-writer and producer) – direction and production: Willy Millowitsch, with Elsa Scholten, Lilo Stiegelmeier, Franz Schneider
- 1954: Das Glücksmädel – Mit Willy Millowitsch, Elsa Scholten, Franz Schneider
- 1954: Prinzess Wäscherin: Die rote Jule (Julchen) – direction: Fritz Andelfinger – with Willy Millowitsch, Elsa Scholten, Franz Schneider
- 1954: Die Zwangseinweisung – with Willy Millowitsch, Elsa Scholten, Robert Jansen
- 1954: Charley's Aunt – direction: Hermann Pfeiffer, with Willy Millowitsch, Franz Schneider, Egon Hoegen
- 1955: Drei Kölsche Jungen – direction and production: Willy Millowitsch, with Elsa Scholten, Maja Scholz, Franz Schneider
- 1958: Die spanische Fliege (Emma Klinke) – direction: Kurt Meister, with Willy Millowitsch, Lotti Krekel, Bernd M. Bausch
- 1959: Drei Kölsche Jungen – direction and production: Willy Millowitsch, mit Elsa Scholten, Maja Scholz, Karl Heinz Bender
- 1959: Mädchen aus der Spitzengasse – direction and production: Willy Millowitsch, mit Franz Schneider, Elsa Scholten, Lotti Krekel
- 1959: Das Glücksmädel – direction and production: Willy Millowitsch, with Helga op gen Orth, Karl Heinz Hillebrand
- 1959: Der keusche Lebemann (Anna) – direction: Hermann Pfeiffer, with Willy Millowitsch, Carsta Löck, Axel Monjé
- 1959: Schneider Wibbel – direction: Peter Hamel, with Willy Millowitsch, Heinz Bennent, Hans Müller-Westernhagen
- 1959: Drei Kölsche Jungen – direction and production: Willy Millowitsch, with Elsa Scholten, Helga op gen Orth, Karl Heinz Bender (studio recording)
- 1961: Schweinefleisch in Dosen – Regie: Hermann Pfeiffer, with Willy Millowitsch, Lotti Krekel, Carla Neizel
- 1961: Im Nachtjackenviertel (Frau Schluddermeier) – direction and production: Willy Millowitsch, with Ully Engel-Harck, Franz Schneider, Elsa Scholten
- 1968: Der Meisterboxer (Adelheid Breitenbach, his wife Frau) – direction: Fred Kraus, with Willy Millowitsch, Thomas Härtner, Lotti Krekel, Günter Lamprecht
- 1968: Pension Schöller (Josephine Krüger) – direction: Fred Kraus, with Willy Millowitsch, Elsa Scholten, Lotti Krekel
- 1969: Der Etappenhase – direction and production: Willy Millowitsch, mit Lotti Krekel, Frank Barufski, Elsa Scholten
