= Egon Hoegen =

German actor (1928–2018)

Eugen Hoegen
- Born: 28 September 1928; Düsseldorf, Germany
- Died: 1 June 2018 (aged 89) (Germany)
- Occupations: actor (stage and television) off-camera voice artist (radio and television)
- Spouse: Dorothea "Dorka"
- Children: 1

Egon Hoegen (28 September 1928 – 1 June 2018) was a German actor and off-camera voice artist.

== Early years ==
Egon Hoegen was born in Düsseldorf and grew up at Linz am Rhein, still on the right bank of the Rhine, but approximately 80 km / 50 miles upriver. His father was a lawyer. The gift of an unusually resonant voice, as he later recalled, was spotted while he was still at school. Trained by Gustaf Gründgens (and others) at the Bonn Theater School, by 1951 he was well on the way to establishing himself as a stage actor.

== Work ==
"He was the nation's driving instructor, the sonorous voice of the television road safety series "Der 7. Sinn" ("The seventh sense")".

Hoegen's obituary in Der Spiegel

In 1954 Hoegen took a major part in Charley's Aunt alongside the siblings Willy and Lucy Millowitsch. The production, at the Millowitsch Theatre in Cologne, was an early example of a stage production shown on German television. During the 1950s he worked three seasons at the Theater Münster, frequently playing "roughneck" parts. It was at Münster that he met his wife and his longstanding friend, the cinema star Gert Fröbe. Hoeger's stage career ended abruptly after he was "discovered" by the national broadcaster, Nordwestdeutscher Rundfunk which quickly led him to radio plays and then to work as a radio news-reader.

"I would say that women drive more responsibly than men."
"Ich würde sagen: Frauen fahren verantwortungsvoller als Männer."

Egon Hoegen quoted by Tobias Christ. 2014

He was known as a long-running introducer-presenter on the political talk show "Der Internationale Frühschoppen" which, after briefly functioning as a radio programme, was transmitted by WDR on German-language television in several countries between 1953 and 1987 (and subsequently revived). He was also the voice on "Ausgerechnet Tatsachen" and on "Der 7. Sinn" ("The seventh sense"). It was the road safety series aimed at drivers, "Der 7. Sinn", for which he is best remembered. It was launched in 1966: around 1,500 editions were screened over nearly forty years. After it was over critics and commentators competed to recall and repeat his most memorable pieces of advice. There were recommendations on how and when to use direction indicators and on the timely fitting of winter tyres. Women were warned against using the rear view mirror for applying face make-up, or risking lives by attempting to drive in high heeled shoes.". He did not write his own texts but, to paraphrase his obituary in Der Spiegel, he made them his own with his resonant vocal euphony and laconic delivery which raised the business of road safety to the level of a personal art-form. Later he also spoke off-camera in the short television comedy Staplerfahrer Klaus – Der erste Arbeitstag ("Forklift Driver Klaus – The first day at work"). The film was a cruel parody of "workplace health and safety" productions of the time: Hoegen's rich serious voice was instantly recognisable to German television viewers which greatly enhanced the film's satirical impact.

Hoegen also featured as a voice artist for the seven part mini-series Journal 1870/71 (1970) which presented the Franco-Prussian War in the style of twentieth century news reportings, and for the Die Harald Schmidt Show (television talk show). In 1973 he was the voice on the radio in the disaster movie, Smog.

At five in the morning on 1 April 1995 Heugen featured as moderator at the launch of the new popular music channel, 1LIVE. He worked for Turkish State Radio during the mid-1990s on the German language "Tourist Magazine" programme, transmitted on the broadcaster's European service. It was in 1996 that the journalist Reinhard Lüke, while discussing the fact that Hoegen was still regularly appearing on television despite being well beyond normal retirement age, described him as "the man who for some unfathomable reason is always smiling" ("... den Mann, der aus unerfindlichen Gründen immer lächelt").

During the later 1990s Hoegen worked on the early German-language versions of Need for Speed computer games, up to the fifth game, Need for Speed: Porsche Unleashed, providing the Voice-over. This included details of the cars, the count downs toll the start of races and small pieces of commentary.

Since 1976 Hoegen has lived in Rösrath, just outside Cologne. He remained involved for many years with Radio Andernach, the official radio station for military personnel. He used the voice he had used for "Der 7. Sinn" to provide occasional "conduct warnings" inserted between the regular programming.

His measured delivery led one journalist to describe him as "the man who never misspeaks" ("Der Mann, der sich nie verspricht"), a soubriquet which Hoegen found "astonishing". He did, however, prepare his vocal presentations with great care and attention to detail, so that his annotated scripts, covered in stress indications and pause marks, were on occasion compared to a Schubert manuscript. His most important professional asset, his voice, he described as "a gift from God" ("ein Geschenk Gottes") but also as "the result of tough training" ("das Ergebnis harten Trainings"). He sustained an extensive programme of vocal exercises in order that he might, in the words of one admirer, "fill the room with an invisible power which vibrates deep in the listener's stomach". He confided one secret to an interviewer: "You have to speak behind the teeth" ("Man muss hinter den Zähnen sprechen.").

== Personal ==
"One of my favourites was without doubt the Citroën DS, a hugely comfortable and reliable car."
"Ein Lieblingsauto von mir war ohne Zweifel der Citroën DS, ein ungeheuer bequemes und zuverlässiges Auto."

Egon Hoegen quoted by Tobias Christ. 2014

He married his wife, usually known as "Dorka", in 1957. They met at the then newly opened Theater Münster. The couple have a daughter.

After 2011 Egon Hoegen had to use a wheel chair to get around in his home. He admitted to an interviewer in 2014 that there had been a number of collisions. "But I never had a car crash". It was clear that he set great store by his accident-free record as a car driver.

== Awards and honours ==
- Order of Merit
- Cross of Honour of traffic training ("Ehrenkreuz der Verkehrswacht")
