= Annika Blendl =

German actress, film director and film producer

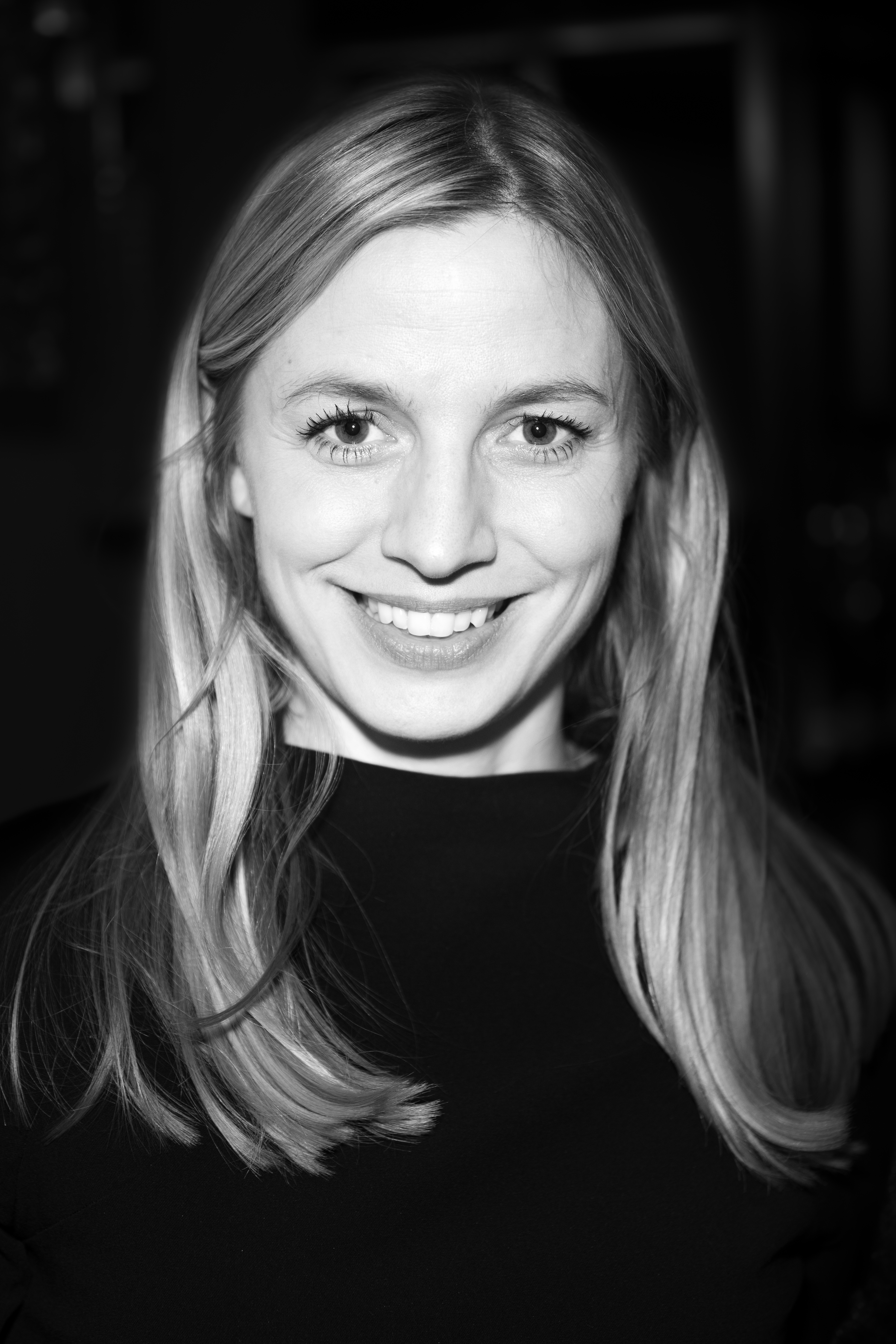
- Blendl at the 69th Berlin International Film Festival in 2019
- Born: Annika Greta Blendl; June 16, 1982 (age 43); Regensburg, West Germany
- Occupations: Actress; director; producer
- Years active: 2004–present
- Known for: Various roles in German television series and films
- Notable work: SK Kölsch, SOKO Wismar, Tatort, Kommissar Dupin, Das Quartett
- Partner: Alexander Beyer
- Children: 1

Annika Greta Blendl (born 16 June 1982 in Regensburg) is a German actress, film director, and film producer.

== Biography ==
=== Early years ===
Annika Blendl grew up with five siblings. She began her artistic career as a student, studying violin, and won first place twice in the nationwide youth competition Jugend musiziert. After graduating, she moved from Cologne to Berlin to pursue acting, following the example of her older sister Mareile. She initially filmed commercials and worked as a model for various fashion brands. In 2004, after meeting director Schorsch Kamerun at the Zurich Schauspielhaus, she collaborated with him on a theatrical adaptation of The Snow Queen, based on Hans Christian Andersen's fairy tale.

=== Film and television ===
Without formal acting training, Blendl received her first television roles in 2002, debuting as Lisa Nordbrock in the television film Love Crash.

Blendl took roles in feature films such as Michael Klier's Farland (2004), Christian Petzold's Ghosts (2005), and Stephan Geene's After Effect (2007). She closed 2008 with the title role in Matthias Tiefenbacher's TV crime drama The Beauty by the Poolside of the ZDF series Ein starkes Team and a guest role in Polizeiruf 110 directed by Alain Gsponer. In addition, she played lead roles in the directorial debut and graduation films Maria am Wasser by Thomas Wendrich (2006) and Transit by Philipp Leinemann (2010).

In 2007, Blendl starred in her first continuous lead role as Sophie Heise in the four-part crime series Donna Roma. From 2014 to 2020, she appeared alongside Pasquale Aleardi as police secretary Nolwenn in the ARD crime series Kommissar Dupin. Since October 2019, Blendl has starred as Detective Pia Walther, grieving the loss of her husband under the leadership of Maike Riems (Anja Kling) in the ZDF crime series Das Quartett.

=== Director and producer ===
In 2009, Blendl began studying documentary film directing at the University of Television and Film Munich and in 2012 co-founded the Man on Mars Filmproduktion (Blendl Schmitt Stade GbR) with director Michael Schmitt and actress Leonie Stade. Here, the feature documentary Mollath – "And Suddenly You're Crazy", which covers the Gustl Mollath case, was produced in 2015. Blendl's graduation project at the HFFM, the feature film with documentary elements All I never wanted, co-directed with Leonie Stade, was also produced by her company.

== Personal life ==
Annika Blendl is in a relationship with actor Alexander Beyer. The couple has one son.

== Filmography ==
=== Feature films ===
- 2002: Heimatfilm!
- 2004: Moon Landing
- 2004: Farland
- 2005: Ghosts
- 2006: Maria am Wasser
- 2007: After Effect
- 2009: Rabbit Without Ears 2
- 2010: Weeds in Paradise
- 2010: Transit
- 2012: Reality XL
- 2012: We Wanted to Go to Sea
- 2013: Nowhereman (documentary; director, screenplay)
- 2013: 9 mois et un coussin
- 2015: Mollath – "And Suddenly You're Crazy" (also director, screenplay, producer)
- 2017: One More Everything
- 2017: Luna
- 2018: Everything is Good
- 2019: All I never wanted (director, screenplay, producer, actress)

=== Television films ===
- 2002: Love Crash
- 2002: The Ladies' Man – Men Among Men
- 2003: D.I.K. – Hunt for Virus X
- 2003: In the Middle of Life
- 2003: Lotti on the Run
- 2004: Cold Spring
- 2006: Lulu
- 2007: Nothing Is Forgotten
- 2011: Leppel & Langsam
- 2011: Pillow Fight
- 2012: The Hunt for the Amber Room
- 2012: Balthasar Berg – See Sylt and Die
- 2015: Death on the Island
- 2015: Life Imprisonment Twice
- 2016: If It's Love
- 2017: Cold Is the Fear
- 2017: A Summer in Cyprus
- 2021: A Risky Decision

=== TV series and mini-series ===
- 2002: Tatort: Oskar
- 2003: In the Name of the Law (episode War Games)
- 2003: Wolff's Turf (episode Taxi to the Moon)
- 2003: Tatort: Leyla
- 2003: Tatort: Vera's Weapons
- 2003: Section 40 (2 episodes)
- 2004: Metropolitan Police (episode Pill Pusher)
- 2004: SK Kölsch (Episode Die Liebesfalle)
- 2004: SOKO Wismar (Episode Gelegenheit macht Diebe)
- 2005: Die Rettungsflieger (Episode Ins Leben zurück)
- 2006: Die Familienanwältin (Episode Die Überlebende)
- 2006, 2012: SOKO Köln (various roles, 2 episodes)
- 2006, 2009: Kommissar Stolberg (various roles, 2 episodes)
- 2006–2009: Heimatgeschichten (3 episodes)
- 2006: Da kommt Kalle (Episode Jugendsünde)
- 2007: Donna Roma (4 episodes)
- 2007: Der letzte Zeuge (Episode Die Handschrift des Mörders)
- 2007: Tatort: Racheengel
- 2008: Mord mit Aussicht (Episode Waldeslust)
- 2008: GSG 9 – Ihr Einsatz ist ihr Leben (Episode Endstation)
- 2008: Polizeiruf 110: Wie ist die Welt so stille
- 2008: Unschuldig (2 episodes)
- 2008, 2015: Der Kriminalist (various roles, 2 episodes)
- 2009: Ein starkes Team: Die Schöne vom Beckenrand
- 2009: Marie Brand und das mörderische Vergessen
- 2011: Danni Lowinski (Episode Falsche Wahl)
- 2011: Bella Block: Stich ins Herz
- 2011: Tatort: Das schwarze Haus
- 2011: Tatort: Ein ganz normaler Fall
- 2012: Das Duo: Der tote Mann und das Meer
- 2012: Ein starkes Team: Schöner Wohnen
- 2012: Letzte Spur Berlin (Episode Verantwortung)
- 2014: Kommissarin Heller: Der Beutegänger
- 2014: Alarm für Cobra 11 – Die Autobahnpolizei (Episode Der Wettkampf)
- 2014: Die Familiendetektivin (Episode Doppelleben)
- 2014–2020: Kommissar Dupin
  - 2014: Bretonische Verhältnisse
  - 2014: Bretonische Brandung
  - 2015: Bretonisches Gold
  - 2017: Bretonischer Stolz
  - 2017: Bretonische Flut
  - 2018: Bretonisches Leuchten
  - 2019: Bretonische Geheimnisse
  - 2020: Bretonisches Vermächtnis
- 2015: Die Chefin (Episode Treibjagd)
- 2015: Tatort: Wer Wind erntet, sät Sturm!
- 2015: Liebe am Fjord – Unterm Eis
- 2015, 2019: Ein Fall für zwei (various roles, 2 episodes)
- 2016: Der Alte (Episode Die Angst danach)
- 2016: Wilsberg: Mord und Beton
- 2018: Der Staatsanwalt (Episode Taunushexe)
- 2019: Zimmer mit Stall: Berge versetzen
- since 2019: Das Quartett
  - 2019: Der lange Schatten des Todes
  - 2020: Das Mörderhaus
  - 2021: Die Tote vom Balkon
  - 2022: Dunkle Helden
  - 2023: Tödliche Lieferung
  - 2023: Mörderischer Pakt
- 2020: Der Bergdoktor (Episode Mutterlügen)
- 2020: Ein starkes Team: Parkplatz bitte sauber halten
- 2020: Tatort: Unter Wölfen
- 2021: Tatort: Rettung so nah
- 2022: Harter Brocken: Das Überlebenstraining
- 2023: Die Chefin (TV series, Episode Gespenster)
- 2024: Der Staatsanwalt (Episode Ein neues Leben)

== Theatre ==
- 2004: The Snow Queen, Schauspielhaus Zürich
