= Jakob Schäuffelen =

German film director and screenwriter (born 1967)

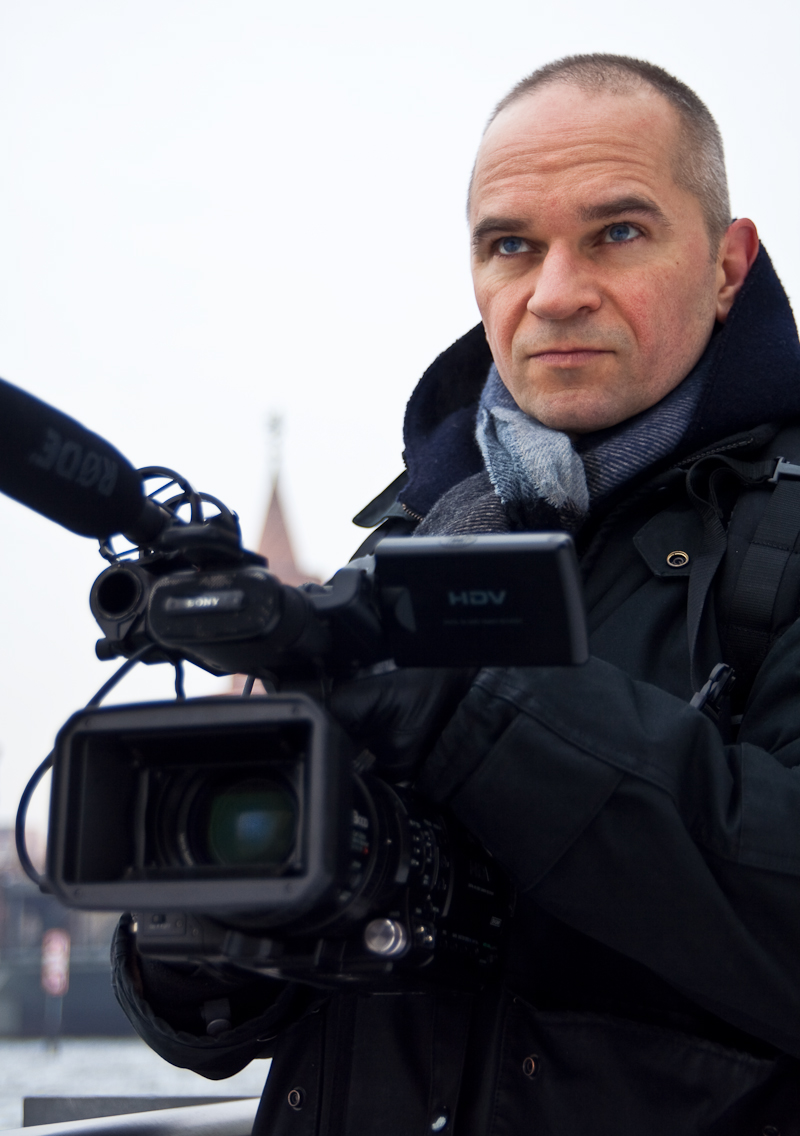
Jakob Schäuffelen (Berlin 2010)

Jakob Schäuffelen (born 19 September 1967) is a German film director and screenwriter.

== Career ==
After studying at the Filmacademy Vienna and the Hamburg Media School he worked as an Assistant Director with several directors including Oliver Hirschbiegel and Jörg Grünler. In 1997 he made his directorial debut with an episode of the German TV series Ein Fall für zwei. After that he directed a variety of TV movies and TV series for the German broadcast companies ZDF, Sat.1 and ProSieben. Edel & Starck, for which he cast the lead actors, influenced the style and directed the pilot and the first 2 episodes, won the Deutscher Fernsehpreis as best TV series among other awards. In 2004 Schäuffelen directed his first feature film Abgefahren, starring Felicitas Woll.

His TV series Kanzleramt, which was somewhat similar to the NBC hit series The West Wing, depicted life and work of a German chancellor, slightly resembling the then acting chancellor Gerhard Schröder. Although highly acclaimed by German critics, the political drama series was brutally ignored by German TV viewers. Therefore the assumption came up that the German audience might not be as much in favor of their political leaders as the American public. He was luckier with his subsequent TV series Donna Roma (in 4 episodes) and three romantic comedies for Sat.1. Thereafter he made his first documentary (Full Contact – A Way Of Living) about four friendly and educated people and their passion for Mixed martial arts.

Jakob Schäuffelen is a member of the Directors Guild of Germany.

== Filmography ==
- 1997: Ein Fall für zwei
- 1998: Ein starkes Team (3 episodes)
- 2000: SK Kölsch (2 episodes)
- 2000: Mind Hunter
- 2000: Nur mein Sohn war Zeuge
- 2001: Edel & Starck (3 episodes)
- 2002: Kein Mann für eine Nummer
- 2003: Abgefahren
- 2004: Kanzleramt (4 episodes)
- 2006: Die Liebesflüsterin
- 2006: Donna Roma (4 episodes)
- 2008: Liebesgruß an einen Engel
- 2008: Dr. Molly & Karl (3 episodes)
- 2010: Anna und die Liebe (10 episodes)
- 2012: Full Contact – A Way Of Living
- 2012: Heiter bis tödlich – Alles Klara (8 episodes)
