= Monika Lundi =

German actress (1942–2025)

- Born: 22 August 1942; Berlin, Germany
- Died: 26 February 2025 (aged 82); Munich, Bavaria, Germany
- Occupation: Film actor
- Years active: 1968–2002
- Spouse: Horst Janson (m. 1973; div. 1976)

Monika Lundi (22 August 1942 – 26 February 2025) was a German television and film actress.

== Early life and career ==
Lundi grew up in an orphanage in Berlin, attended a household school, and later trained as a graphic designer at the Berlin University of the Arts. She also worked as a photographic model and appeared on the cover of Quick (German magazine) on November 29, 1967.

After several minor film and television roles, Lundi landed her first major role in the 1968 comedy film Das Go-Go-Girl vom Blow-Up. She became well known to television audiences through the eleven-part series Von Liebe keine Rede. In 1972, she starred alongside Roy Black in Grün ist die Heide.

In 1973, Lundi won the bronze Bravo Otto award and played the lead role in the television film Sternschnuppe, in which she also performed the song "Lass die Sterne, wo sie sind".

== Personal life ==
Lundi married actor Horst Janson in Denmark in 1973, but the marriage ended in divorce in 1976. In 1975, she recorded the German version of "Having My Baby" by Paul Anka, titled "Wir wollen es haben", produced by Michael Kunze.

In 1979/80, Lundi made headlines when she accused her colleague Burkhard Driest of rape during an acting workshop in Santa Monica. Driest was later convicted of bodily harm and fined $500.

Lundi later had roles in various television series, including Tatort, Ein Fall für Zwei, and Marienhof. She also worked as an audiobook narrator.

She was married to director Hartmut Griesmayr and, from 1989, to actor Hans Stetter (1927–2019).

Lundi died on 26 February 2025, at the age of 82.

== Films ==
- Mord in Frankfurt (1968, TV film)
- Sugar Bread and Whip (1968)
- 24 Hour Lover (1968)
- Babeck (1968, TV miniseries)
- Das Go-Go-Girl vom Blow-Up (1969)
- Der Kommissar: Dr. Meinhardts trauriges Ende (1970, TV series episode)
- Von Liebe keine Rede (1971, TV series)
- The Captain (1971)
- Grün ist die Heide (1972)
- ...aber Jonny! (1973)
- Crazy – Completely Mad (1973)
- No Gold for a Dead Diver (1974)
- Tatort: Kindergeld (1982, TV series episode)
- Ein Fall für zwei: Tödliches Viereck (1983, TV series episode)
- Alle meine Töchter (1995–2001, TV series)
