= Jutta Speidel =

German actress (born 1954)

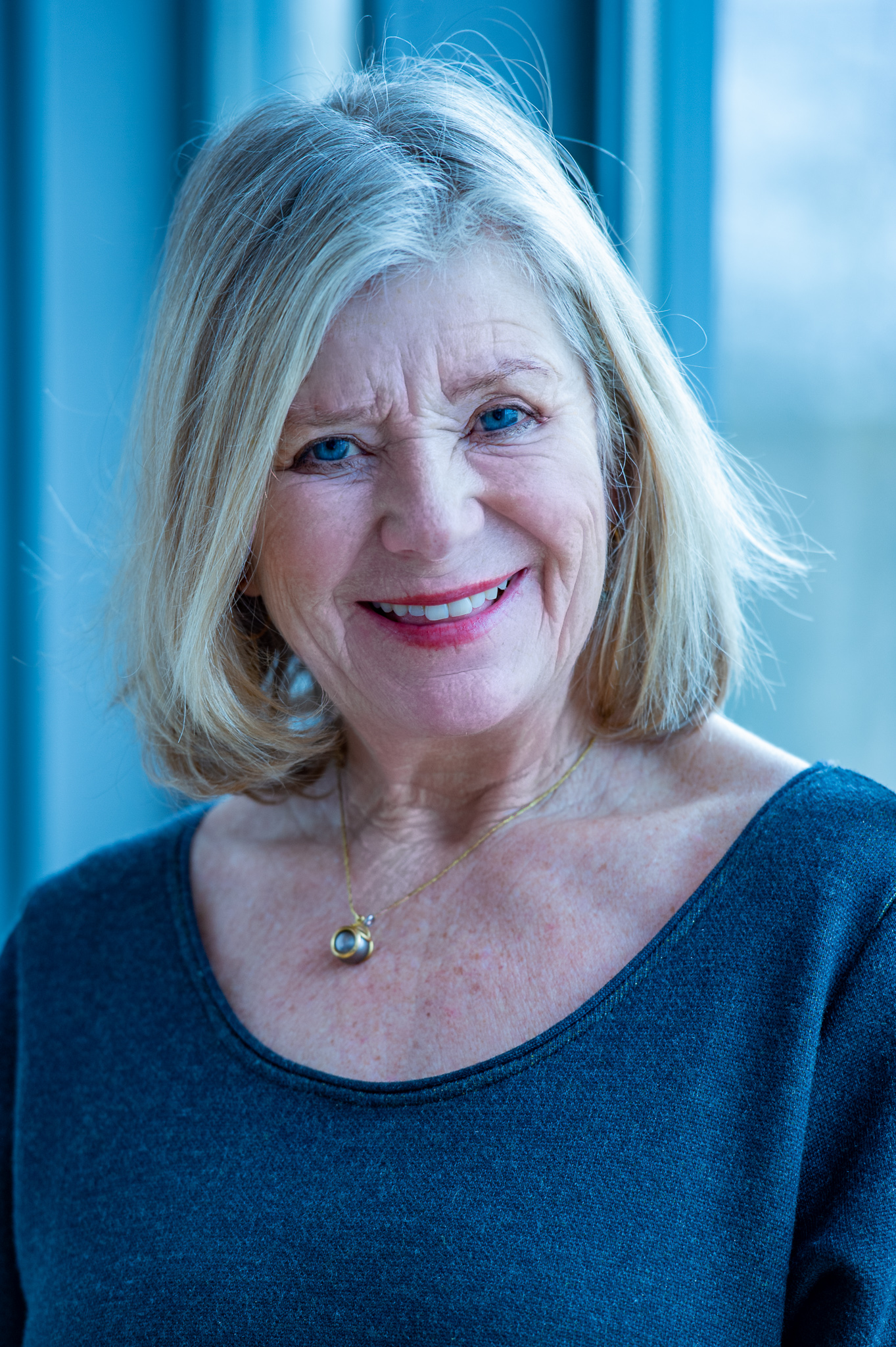
- Speidel in 2019
- Born: 26 March 1954 (age 72); Munich, West Germany
- Occupation: Actress

Jutta Speidel (pronounced [ˈjʊtaː ˈʃpaɪdl̩]; born 26 March 1954) is a German actress.

She had her first television role at the age of 15. Jutta Speidel appeared in Schulmadchen Report 1 (1970), which was directed by Ernst Hofbauer and produced by Wolf C. Hartwig. She acted mainly in German television series and TV films like Rivalen der Rennbahn. She is remembered for playing several roles in the very popular TV series Derrick.

She has two daughters. She founded the HORIZONT e.V. charity in 1997 for homeless children and their mothers.

As of 3 November 2012 she is living in Rome, Italy.

== Selected filmography ==
- We'll Take Care of the Teachers (1970)
- Twenty Girls and the Teachers (1971), as Ina
- Morgen fällt die Schule aus (1971), as Lydia Meier
- Our Willi Is the Best (1971), as Biggi Hansen
- The Heath Is Green (1972), as Hanna Engelmann
- Old Barge, Young Love (1973), as Elke Steubels
- The Twins from Immenhof (1973), as Anke
- Blue Blooms the Gentian (1973), as Kuni
- Auch ich war nur ein mittelmäßiger Schüler (1974), as Julia
- The Secret Carrier (1975), as Lisa Hopfen
- The Last Holidays (1975, TV film), as Beate Rehberg
- Drei sind einer zuviel (1977, TV series, 13 episodes), as Charlotte Möller
- Bier und Spiele (1977, TV series, 8 episodes), as Liz Meier
- Derrick, as Season 5, Episode 6: "Klavierkonzert" (1978, TV), as Helga Kling
- Kidnapped (1978, TV miniseries), as Barbara Grant
- Derrick, as Season 6, Episode 10: "Das dritte Opfer" (1979, TV), as Gabriele Voss
- Fleisch (1979, TV film), as Monica
- Mathias Sandorf (1979, TV miniseries), as Rena Sandorf
- The Rebel (1980), as Vivien
- Derrick, as Season 8, Episode 5: "Die Schwester" (1981, TV), as Doris Menke
- No Terraced House for Robin Hood (1981), as Britta Schmidt
- Danny's Dream (1982, TV film), as Sandra
- Dr. Margarete Johnsohn (1982, TV film), as Klara
- Wie hätten Sie’s denn gern? (1983), as Julia
- Crooks in Paradise (1985, TV film), as Madeleine
- Suddenly at Home (1985, TV film), as Helen Tenby
- Judgment in Berlin (1988), as Sigrid Radke
- Rivalen der Rennbahn (1989, TV series, 11 episodes), as Monika Adler
- Forsthaus Falkenau (1989–1995, TV series, 40 episodes), as Silva Baroneß von Bernried
- Kartoffeln mit Stippe (1990, TV miniseries), as Gertrud Gräfin von Retzlow
- Success (1991), as Katharina von Radolny
- Me and Christine (1993), as Luzie
- Alle meine Töchter (1995–2001, TV series, 79 episodes), as Margot Sanwaldt
- Tricked (2000, TV film), as Renate Rehberg
- Um Himmels Willen (2002–2012, TV series, 67 episodes), as Lotte Albers
- Storm Tide (2006, TV film), as Hilde Döbbelin
- Donna Roma (2007, TV series, 4 episodes), as Frederike Heise
- Oh Tannenbaum (2007, TV film), as Rita Niemann
- Aber jetzt erst recht (2010, TV film), as Katharina Pfeiffer
- Sun, Secrets and Salami (2012, TV film), as Jutta Riedl
- Jet Set, Jitters and Jealousy (2013, TV film), as Jutta Riedl
- Two Fools in Sardinia (2015, TV film), as Jutta Riedl
- Club der einsamen Herzen (2019, TV film), as Helga
