= Mariele Millowitsch =

German actress (born 1955)

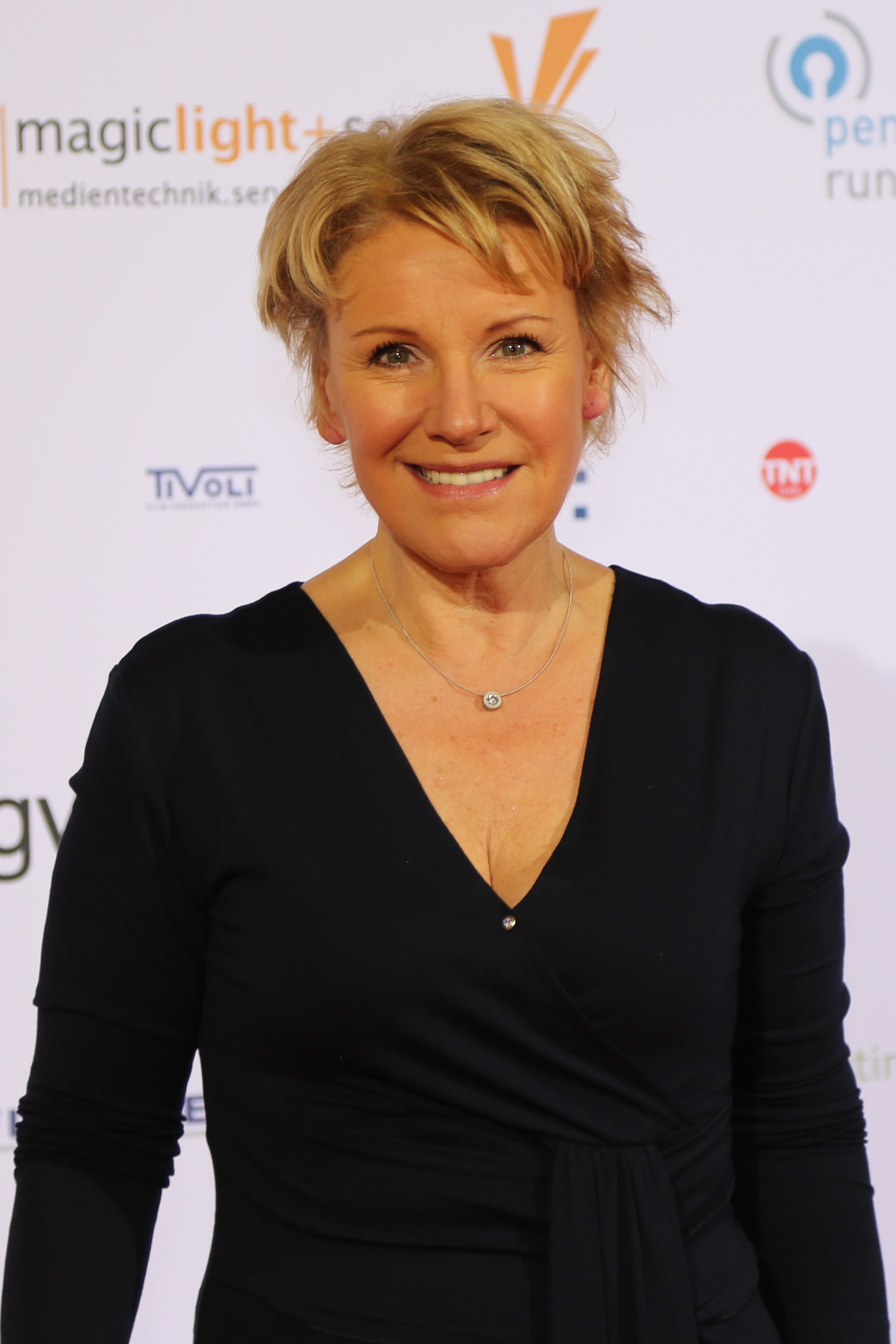
- Millowitsch in 2017
- Born: Marie-Luise Millowitsch; 23 November 1955 (age 70); Cologne, West Germany
- Occupation: Actress

Marie-Luise Millowitsch (born 23 November 1955) is a German actress.

== Life ==
Millowitsch was born on 23 November 1955 in Cologne, North Rhine-Westphalia. She is the daughter of Willy Millowitsch and one of the three sisters of Peter Millowitsch.

She studied veterinary medicine at LMU Munich (doctorate in 1991). She lived with her partner in Cologne. The couple split in December 2009 after eight years of relationship.

== Filmography (selection) ==
=== Cinema movies ===
- 1991: Pizza Colonia
- 1992: Wunderjahre
- 2004: Guys and Balls
- 2011: Ausreichend (short film)

=== Television movies ===
- 1965: Drei kölsche Jungen (recording from the Millowitsch-Theater)
- 1973: Liebe mit 50
- 1975: Die Stadt im Tal
- 1975: Probezeit
- 1975: Rauschgift
- 1978: Tatort: Der Feinkosthändler
- 1983: Die Sache Mensch
- 1984: Das Glücksmädel
- 1984: Das Liebesverbot
- 1984: Adel verpflichtet zu nichts
- 1984: Die spanische Fliege
- 1986: Tatort: Schwarzes Wochenende
- 1987: Minipli
- 1987: Das Mädchen aus dem Fahrstuhl
- 1987: Die vertagte Hochzeitsnacht
- 1989: Brausepulver – Berta und die Stürmer
- 1990: Der Medienfreak
- 1996: Das Traumschiff: Sydney
- 1998: Wiedersehen in Palma
- 1999: Meine beste Feindin
- 2000: Ich kaufe mir einen Mann
- 2000: Anyone but You
- 2002: Die Stimmen
- 2003: Lottoschein ins Glück
- 2004: Untreu
- 2005: Damals warst Du still
- 2005: Das geheime Leben meiner Freundin
- 2008: Mein Gott, Anna!
- 2008: Das Traumschiff: Rio de Janeiro
- 2008: Das Traumschiff: Vietnam
- 2009: Mein Mann, seine Geliebte und ich
- 2009: Heute keine Entlassung
- 2010: Scheidung für Fortgeschrittene
- 2011: Die Trödelqueen – Gelegenheit macht Liebe
- 2012: Idiotentest
- 2012: Schlaflos in Schwabing
- 2013: Der große Schwindel
- 2014: Friendship on Hold
- 2015: Eine Handvoll Briefe – Liebe im Gepäck (beim ORF Lost & Found)
- 2016: Mama geht nicht mehr
- 2025: Von uns wird es keiner sein

=== Television series ===
- 1990: Heidi und Erni (12 episodes)
- 1993: Tisch und Bett (1 episode)
- 1993: Ihre Exzellenz, die Botschafterin (1 episode)
- 1993: Kommissar Klefisch (1 episode)
- 1994: Julie Lescaut (1 episode)
- 1994: Hallo, Onkel Doc! (1 episode)
- 1994: Wir sind auch nur ein Volk (1 episode)
- 1995: Sommergeschichten (1 episode)
- 1995–2004: girl friends – Freundschaft mit Herz (69 episodes)
- 1996: Heimatgeschichten (2 episodes)
- 1996: Der Mordsfilm (3 episodes)
- 1997–2005: Nikola (title role, 110 episodes)
- 1998: Das Amt (1 episode)
- 2000: Der Fahnder (1 episode)
- 2005–2006: Die Familienanwältin (16 episodes)
- since 2008: Marie Brand (34 episodes)
- 2014: Danni Lowinski (episode: Grün ist die Hoffnung)
- 2016: SOKO Köln (episode: Letzte Meile)
- 2019: Käthe und ich – Dornröschen
- 2019: Käthe und ich – Das Findelkind
- 2019: Ein Fall für Dr. Abel – Zerbrochen

== Awards ==
- 1996: Goldener Löwe (won)
- 1998: Adolf-Grimme-Preis (won)
- 1999: Deutscher Fernsehpreis (nominated)
- 2000: Goldene Kamera (won)
- 2002: Bayerischer Fernsehpreis (won)
- 2003: Deutscher Fernsehpreis (won)
- 2006: Deutscher Fernsehpreis (nominated)
