= The Mimosa Wants to Blossom Too =

1976 film

- Directed by: Helmut Meewes
- Written by: Helmut Meewes
- Produced by: Hans Pflüger
- Starring: Curd Jürgens; Eric Pohlmann; Horst Frank
- Cinematography: Werner Kurz
- Production company: Cinema 77
- Distributed by: Constantin Film
- Release date: 6 February 1976
- Running time: 84 minutes
- Country: West Germany
- Language: German

The Mimosa Wants to Blossom Too (German: Auch Mimosen wollen blühen) is a 1976 West German comedy spy film directed by Helmut Meewes and starring Curd Jürgens, Eric Pohlmann and Horst Frank.

The film's sets were designed by the art director Peter Rothe.

== Cast ==
- Curd Jürgens as Josef Popov
- Eric Pohlmann as Iwan Pederenko
- Horst Frank as Oberst Oschenko
- Susi Nicoletti as Emily Hopkins
- Heinz Reincke as Obdachloser
- Barbara Nielsen as Ludmilla
- Chiquita Gordon as Miss Ly
- Erich Padalewski as Mr. Gate
- Ljuba Welitsch as Lady Shots
- Harry Hardt as Sir Shots

== Bibliography ==
- Bock, Hans-Michael & Bergfelder, Tim. The Concise CineGraph. Encyclopedia of German Cinema. Berghahn Books, 2009.
