= Schwarzwaldfahrt aus Liebeskummer =

- Directed by: Werner Jacobs
- Starring: Roy Black; Barbara Nielsen; Heidi Hansen
- Release date: 1974
- Running time: 90 minutes
- Language: German

Schwarzwaldfahrt aus Liebeskummer (German pronunciation: [ˈʃvaʁtsvaltfaːɐ̯t ʔaʊs ˈliːbəskʊmɐ]) is a 1974 German comedy film directed by Werner Jacobs and starring Roy Black, Barbara Nielsen and Heidi Hansen.

== Cast ==
- Roy Black ... Hannes Cremer
- Barbara Nielsen ... Renate Berndorf
- Heidi Hansen ... Ilse Berndt
- Elke Aberle ... Mucki
- Anita Mally ... Babs
- Peter Millowitsch ... Zimmermann Uwe
- Hans-Jürgen Bäumler ... Fotograf Harry
- Gracia-Maria Kaus ... Janine Breitner
- Rut Rex ... Luise Klingenberg
- Rolf Olsen ... Breitner
- Eva Garden ... Silvia
- Alexander Grill ... Pit Pfluger
- Ludwig Schmid-Wildy ... Opa Cremer
- Ilse Peternell ... Evas Mutter
- Ralf Wolter ... Evas Vater
- Max Strecker ... Räbele
- Elfie Pertramer ... 'Trauben'-Wirtin
- Franz Muxeneder ... Wirt
- Hans Terofal ... Herr Zwicker
- Claus Biederstaedt ... Bernhard Klingenberg
