= Barbara Nielsen =

Dutch actress (born 1949)

- Born: 20 September 1949 (age 77); Warsaw
- Occupations: Film actor Television actor
- Years active: 1972 -

Barbara Nielsen (born 20 September 1949 in Warsaw as Barbara Karska) is a Polish actress and journalist. Between 1972 and 1998, she acted in numerous films produced in Poland, Germany, France, Yugoslavia, the Netherlands, South Africa, and Egypt. She has lived in Perth, Australia since 1998.

== Filmography ==
Year	Title	Role	Notes
1972	Lonely Wives	Karen	
1972	Robinson und seine wilden Sklavinnen	Kundin in Apotheke	Uncredited
1972	Anatomia miłości	Basia	
1973	Old Barge, Young Love	Petra Hauser	
1973	Das Wandern ist Herrn Müllers Lust	Dagmar	
1973	Wenn jeder Tag ein Sonntag wär	Otti	Uncredited
1974	Schwarzwaldfahrt aus Liebeskummer	Renate Berndorf	
1974	Zwei im 7. Himmel	Wilma	
1975	Das Rückendekolleté		
1975	Ich denk’ mich tritt ein Pferd	Lil	
1976	The Mimosa Wants to Blossom Too	Ludmilla	
1977	Hajka		
1983	The Bride Who Came In from the Cold	Zosia	
1984	Non-Stop Trouble with My Double	Molly	
1984	Year of the Jellyfish	Barbara	
1985	Tranches de vie	Marianna	
1990	Schweitzer	Rachel	
1990	Kwagga Strikes Back	German Tourist	
1995	Soweto Green	Eva	
1998	Prostytutki		(final film role)
