= The Heath Is Green (1972 film) =

1972 film

- Scene from a film
- German: Grün ist die Heide
- Directed by: Harald Reinl
- Written by: Hermann Löns (novel); Michael Wildberger; Michael Haller; Gustav Kampendonk
- Produced by: Heinz Willeg; Manfred Barthel; Rob Houwer
- Starring: Roy Black; Monika Lundi; Peter Millowitsch
- Cinematography: Karl Löb
- Edited by: Alfred Srp
- Music by: Peter Schirmann
- Production company: Allianz Filmproduktion
- Distributed by: Constantin Film
- Release date: 20 December 1972
- Running time: 86 minutes
- Country: West Germany
- Language: German

The Heath is Green (German: Grün ist die Heide) is a 1972 German drama film directed by Harald Reinl and starring Roy Black, Monika Lundi and Peter Millowitsch. It is not a remake of the 1951 film The Heath Is Green, but is also based on the motifes by Hermann Löns. Some of his poems were turned into songs in this movie.

== Synopsis ==
Three friends take their holiday at a remote house in the middle of a heath, but soon grow bored of it and go out looking for excitement.

== Cast ==
- Roy Black as Norbert
- Monika Lundi as Ursula
- Peter Millowitsch as Möps
- Jutta Speidel as Hanna Engelmann
- Rainer Rudolph as Bernie
- Viktoria Brams as Anita
- Heidi Kabel as Frau Engelmann
- Henry Vahl as Opa
- Jean-Claude Hoffmann as Stefan
- Günther Schramm as Dr. Velten
- Rut Rex as Frau Berger
- Ralf Wolter as Herr Hoegen
- Agnes Windeck as Frau von Meltendorf
- Eddi Arent as Herr Locher
