= The Secret Carrier =

- Directed by: Franz Josef Gottlieb
- Written by: Heinz G. Konsalik
- Produced by: Hans Pflüger
- Starring: Willy Millowitsch; Brigitte Mira; Sybil Danning
- Cinematography: Klaus König
- Edited by: Ingrid Bichler
- Music by: Mikis Theodorakis
- Production company: Zweite Produktions
- Distributed by: Constantin Film
- Release date: 18 December 1975
- Running time: 95 minutes
- Country: West Germany
- Language: German

The Secret Carrier (German: Der Geheimnisträger) is a 1975 West German comedy film directed by Franz Josef Gottlieb and starring Willy Millowitsch, Brigitte Mira and Sybil Danning.

Location shooting took place in Rhodes.

== Synopsis ==
A mild-mannered Cologne accountant is recruited to take part in a secret mission.

== Cast ==
- Willy Millowitsch as Buchhalter Kuno Hopfen
- Gunther Philipp as Drusus Malz
- Brigitte Mira as Betty Hopfen
- Sybil Danning as Tanja
- Jürgen Scheller as Mann mit den zehn Gesichtern
- Hansi Kraus as Curd Bergmann
- Jutta Speidel as Lisa Hopfen
- Peter Millowitsch as Ferdinand Platz
- Alexander Allerson as Dr. Dregger
- Walter Ullrich as Dr. Herms
- Barbara Assmann as Luise Platz
- Gernot Duda as Agent ZZ
- Theo Lingen as Dr. Thoms
- Eddi Arent as Wiesbach
- Heinz Reincke as Pitter

== Bibliography ==
- Bock, Hans-Michael & Bergfelder, Tim. The Concise CineGraph. Encyclopedia of German Cinema. Berghahn Books, 2009.
