= Rut Rex =

German actor and musician (born 1931)

- Born: July 15, 1931 (age 95); Saarbrücken, Territory of the Saar Basin
- Other name: Rut Rex-Viehöver
- Occupations: Film actor Television actor
- Years active: 1959 -

Rut Rex-Viehöver is a German actor and musician.

== Selected filmography ==
- The White Horse Inn (1960)
- What Is the Matter with Willi? (1970)
- Our Willi Is the Best (1971)
- The Heath Is Green (1972)
- Old Barge, Young Love (1973)
- Stolen Heaven (1974)
- Schwarzwaldfahrt aus Liebeskummer (1974)
- The Fruit is Ripe (1976) - Patricia's mother
