= Old Barge, Young Love (1973 film) =

1973 film

- Barbara Nielsen in a scene from the film
- Directed by: Werner Jacobs
- Written by: Michael Wildberger
- Produced by: Heinz Willeg
- Starring: Roy Black; Barbara Nielsen; Peter Millowitsch; Jutta Speidel
- Cinematography: Franz Xaver Lederle
- Edited by: Elisabeth Imholte
- Music by: Hans Bertram; Peter Schirmann
- Production companies: Allianz Filmproduktion; Terra-Filmkunst
- Distributed by: Constantin Film
- Release date: 19 September 1973
- Running time: 96 minutes
- Country: West Germany
- Language: German

Old Barge, Young Love (German: Alter Kahn und junge Liebe) is a 1973 West German comedy romance film directed by Werner Jacobs and starring Roy Black, Barbara Nielsen, and Peter Millowitsch.

Location shooting took place around Schaffhausen in Northern Switzerland.

== Cast ==
- Roy Black as Mark Tanner
- Barbara Nielsen as Petra Hauser
- Peter Millowitsch as Ulli Specht
- Jutta Speidel as Elke Steubels
- Agnes Windeck as Henriette Kopisch
- Willy Millowitsch as Jupp König
- Eddi Arent as Eugen Quandt
- Edith Hancke as Eleonore Strunz
- Ralf Wolter as Erwin
- Rut Rex as Hilde
- Anita Hegerland as Anita
- Stefan Behrens as Rob
- Inge Marschall as Sekretärin
- Horst Naumann as Marks Chef
- Herbert Tiede as Generaldirektor Bockmann
- Catharina Conti as Lona
- Peter W. Staub as Polizist
- Oscar Heiler as Reeder

== Bibliography ==
- Bock, Hans-Michael; Bergfelder, Tim, eds. (2009). The Concise Cinegraph: Encyclopaedia of German Cinema. New York: Berghahn Books. ISBN 978-1-57181-655-9.
