= Oh, This Father =

West German television series

- Genre: Comedy
- Starring: Willy Millowitsch; Eva Pflug
- Country of origin: West Germany
- Original language: German
- No. of episodes: 26

Production
- Running time: 25 minutes

Original release
- Network: ARD
- Release: 4 April 1978

Oh, This Father (German: Oh, dieser Vater) is a West German comedy television series which aired on ARD between 1978 and 1981. It was inspired by the British television series Father, Dear Father. Willy Millowitsch plays the father of two teenage daughters.

== Bibliography ==
- Jovan Evermann. Der Serien-Guide: M-S. Schwarzkopf & Schwarzkopf, 1999.
