= Forklift Driver Klaus – The First Day on the Job =

- Konstantin Graudus as Klaus
- Directed by: Stefan Prehn; Jörg Wagner
- Written by: Jörg Wagner; Stefan Prehn
- Produced by: Michael Sombetzki
- Starring: Konstantin Graudus
- Narrated by: Egon Hoegen
- Cinematography: Matthias Lehmann
- Edited by: Andrea Stabenow
- Music by: Laurent Lombard
- Release date: 2000
- Running time: 9 minutes
- Country: Germany
- Language: German
- Budget: €90,000

Forklift Driver Klaus – The First Day on the Job (German: Staplerfahrer Klaus – Der erste Arbeitstag) is a German short film from 2000 about the first day of Klaus' work as a forklift driver. The film is a parody of work safety films from the 1980s.

The film was written and directed by Stefan Prehn and Jörg Wagner and stars Konstantin Graudus as the title role of Klaus. The narration was provided by Egon Hoegen, whose voice was well known in Germany from numerous road safety films.

The film quickly became famous, thanks in part to its splatter film violence, which fans regard as comical due to its extreme and obviously fake nature. The film received several awards and was made available on DVD by Anolis Entertainment in 2003, dubbed in English, French, and Spanish.

== Plot ==
The film is presented as a safety instruction video for forklift truck drivers and shows the first day of work for newly qualified forklift truck driver Klaus. The film highlights, in a gory manner, the dangers of unsafe operation of machinery, as well as inattention as a result of chitchatting and distraction by a female coworker passing by.

Shortly after Klaus' first operation of the forklift, he nearly hits a co-worker leaving the warehouse through the garage door, where walking is forbidden, instead of the pedestrian exit door. While this causes no injury, it hints at what would be coming. As the film progresses, the injuries/deaths become more brutal, beginning with things like a man falling from the forklift after he was lifted on a bare wooden platform rather than in a safety cage, and closing with the most violent: ending in a stray chainsaw being driven around by a severed arm on the floor, reaching and ripping through a man who had already been cut in half waist-down due to Klaus' previous accident. A gory POV shot of the chainsaw chopping through the man is shown. The warehouse's alarm bell ends up falling from its mount due to corrosion from blood stains and lands on a head as apparent from a screaming sound. The film ends as Klaus is decapitated by the chainsaw and two men are left impaled onto the forklift prongs, screaming. The forklift drives off into the sunset as the impaled men continue to scream with the chainsaw racing after them. The closing musical theme, "Happyland", was written by French composer Laurent Lombard.

== Cast ==
- Konstantin Graudus as Forklift Driver Klaus
- Egon Hoegen as narrator
- Sönke Korres as Plummetting Helmut
- Erik Rossbander as Werner the Knife
- Till Huster as No Hands Günther
- Dieter Dost as Bisected Herbert
- Jürgen Kossel as Chainsaw Rudi
- Douglas Welbat as Headphone Paul
- Gustav Adolph Artz as Seminar Instructor
- Clarissa Schröter as Secretary

== Usage as a safety film ==
Although the film is not officially part of the German training and education system for forklift trucks, it has been shown by some instructors as an example of what forklift drivers should not do.

== Awards ==
The film has won many awards, including:

- The Canal+ International Award for Best Short Film at the Cinema Jove Festival Internacional de Cine València in 2001
- The Jury Award for Best Short Film and the Audience Award for Best Short Film at the San Sebastian Horror and Fantasy Film Festival in 2001
- The Audience Award for Short Film and the Special Prize of the European Broadcasters Jury for Best Original Idea at the Brussels International Festival of Fantasy Film in 2002
- The Friedrich-Wilhelm-Murnau-Award at the Day of the German Short Film awards in 2002
- The German Film Critics Award for Best Short Film at the German Film Critics Association Awards in 2002
- The Jury Prize for Best Short Film at the Fantasia Film Festival in 2003 (where it also won 3rd place in the Best Short Film category)
