= Hänneschen-Theater =

Puppet theater in Cologne, germany

Coordinates: 50°56′13″N 6°57′42″E

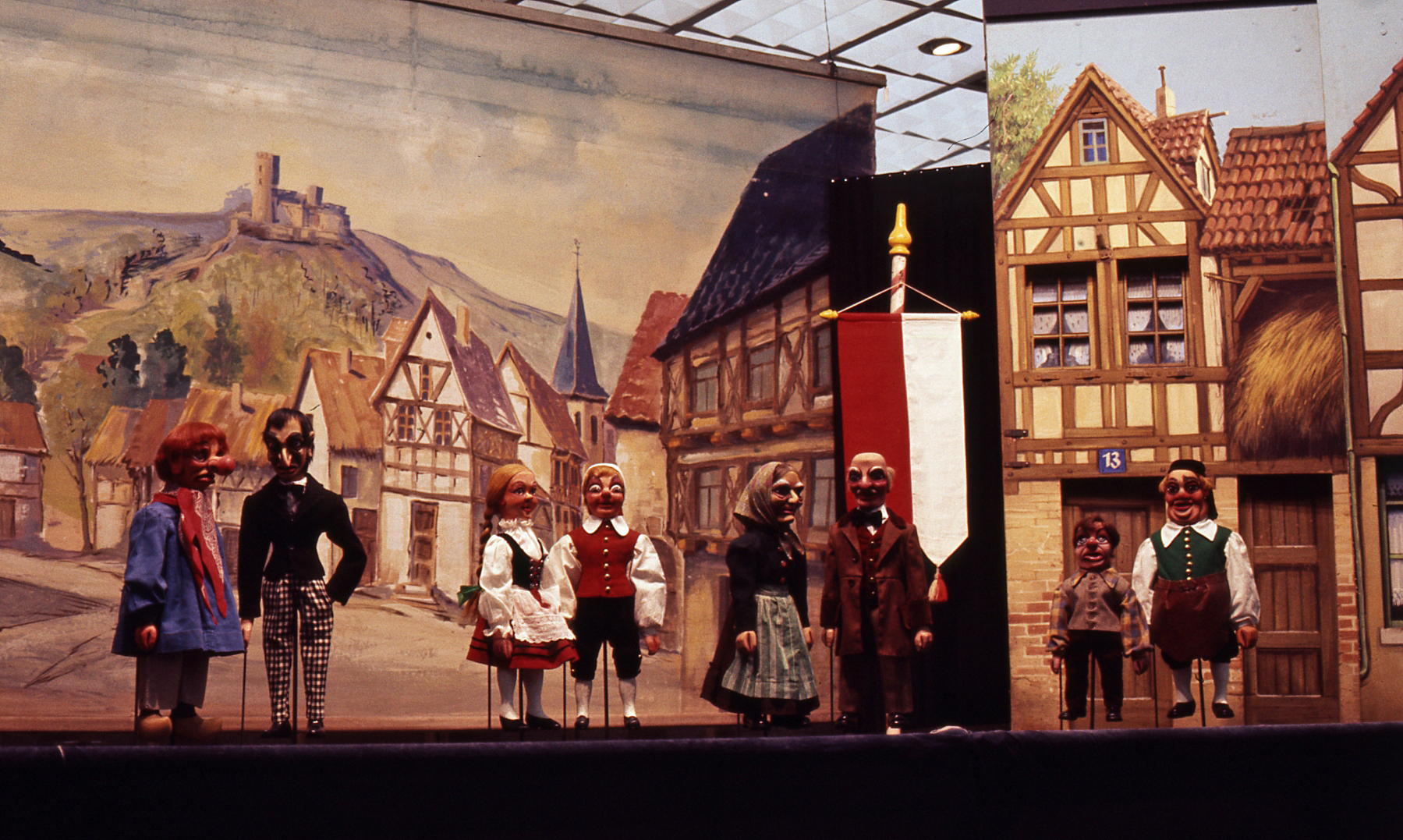
Stage performance

Hänneschen-Theater (German: [ˈhɛnəsçn̩ teˌʔaːtɐ]; Kölsch: Hännesje Tiater [ˈhɛ́nəsjə tiˈjátɐ]) is a traditional puppetry-theatre in Cologne, Germany, established in the year 1802. The stage is situated in a building on Eisenmarkt in downtown Cologne.

The Hänneschen-Theater pieces are set in Knollendorf, a fictional village somewhere in the outskirts of Cologne. The popular puppets represent fictional characters who embody typical traits of Colognian people, and include Tünnes, Schäl, Hänneschen and Bärbelchen, as well as other unique characters. In addition to the ever-changing pieces that are staged for adults and children, the puppet shows are also an important part of the Cologne Carnival. The carnival puppet session is each year a loving parody of a conventional Carnival session.

== Puppets ==
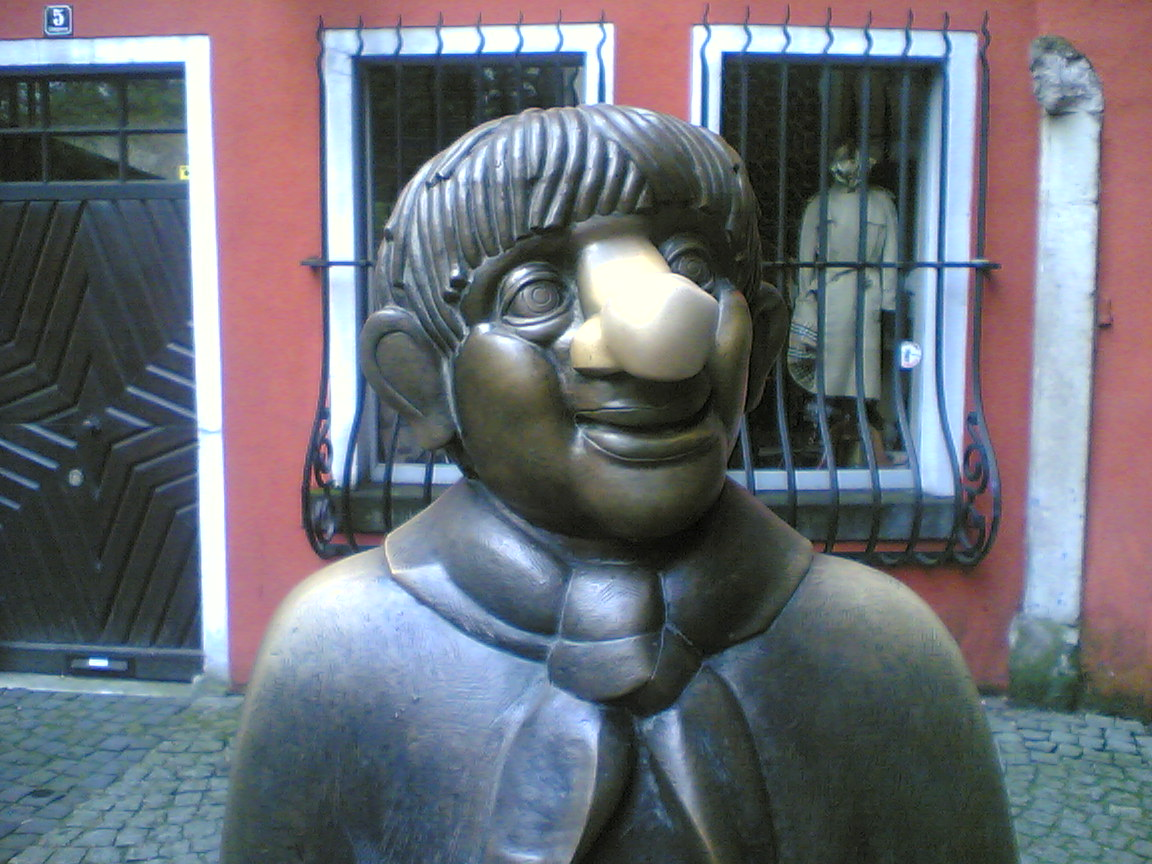
Tünnes

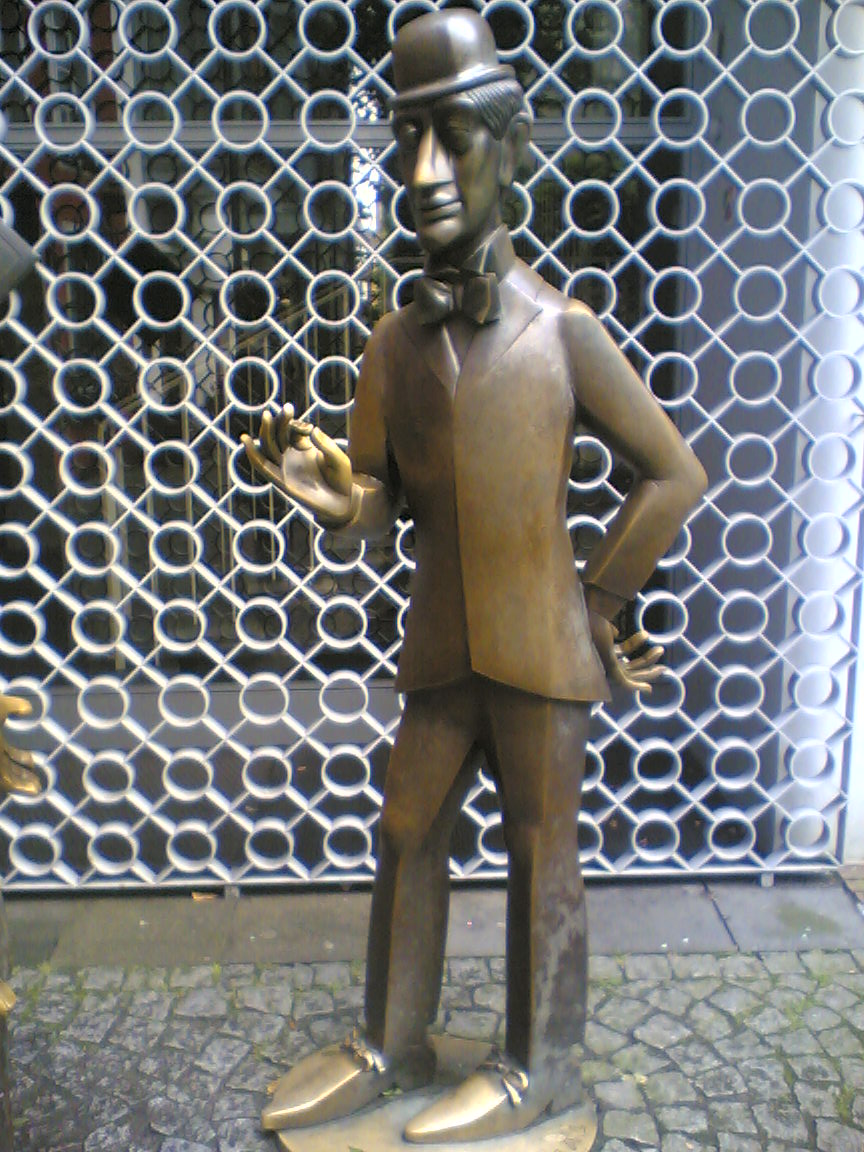
Schäl

Two of the more popular puppets are Tünnes and Schäl (Tünnes un Schäl [ˈtʏ̂nəs ʊn ˈʃɛ́l]). The name Tünnes is the Rheinish form of Anthony or Antonius; Tünnes is good natured and has a rural, farmer-type of common sense and cleverness. Schäl can refer to the squinted eyes of the two figures or also a term meaning 'two-faced' or 'iniquitous' in the Kölsch dialect; Schäl is skinnier than Tünnes and wears a tailcoat.

Christoph Winters, the founder of the first Cologne Hänneschen puppet theater, introduced Tünnes to the ensemble in 1803. Schäl was introduced in 1847 in a competing theater run by Franz Millewitsch, an ancestor of actor Willy Millowitsch. Millewitsch placed the sly figure of Schäl with the good-natured Tünnes, clearly a nudge against his clever competitor Winters.
