= Joseph Giampietro =

Austrian actor, operetta singer and comedian

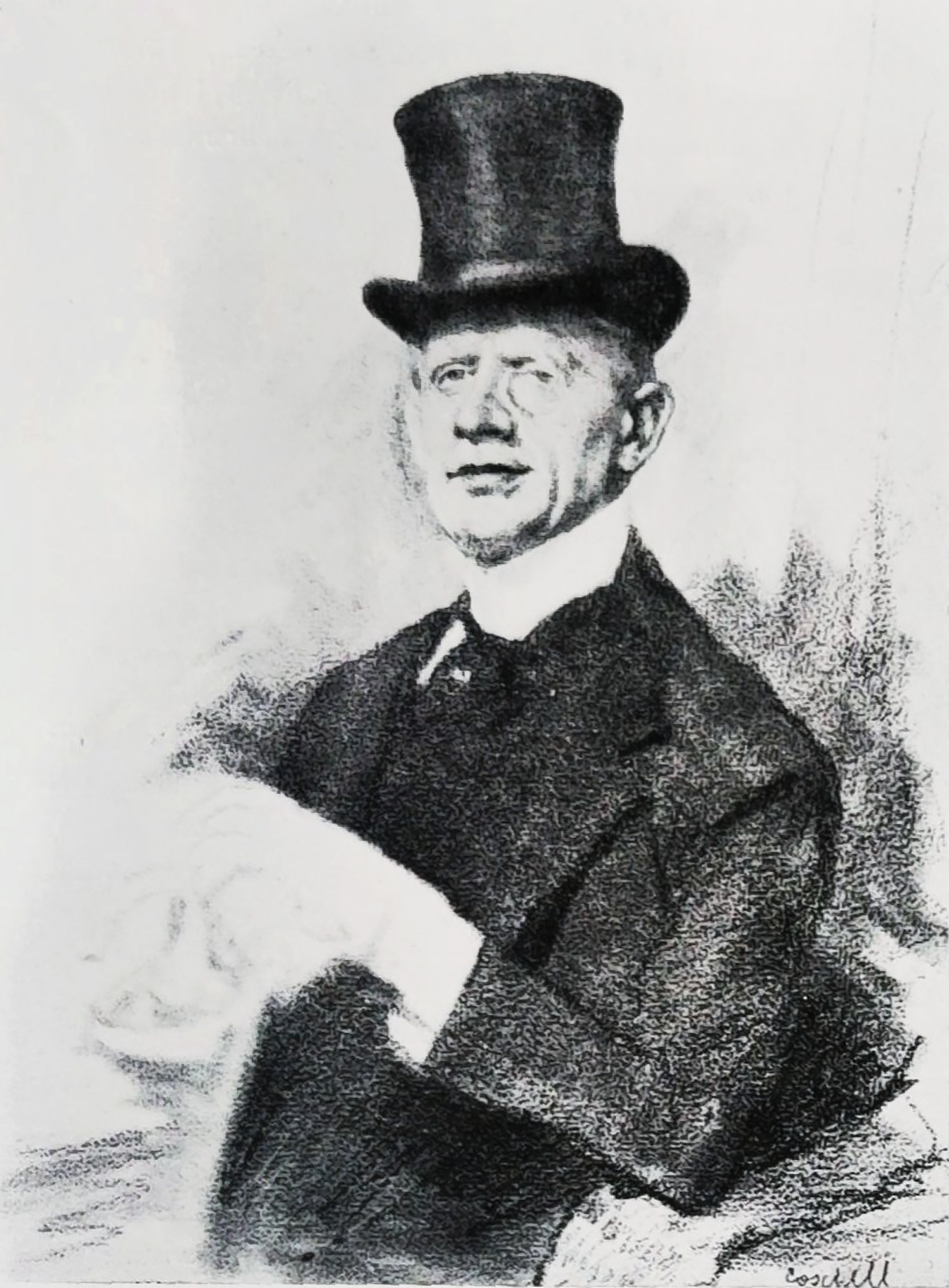
- Giampietro in 1907
- Born: June 21, 1866; Vienna, Austria
- Died: December 29, 1913 (aged 47); Berlin, Germany
- Other names: Josef Giampietro
- Occupations: Actor, singer
- Notable work: Don Juan heiratet

Joseph Giampietro, also known as Josef Giampietro (21 June 1866 – 29 December 1913), was an Austrian actor, operetta singer, and comedian.

== Life ==
Giampietro studied at the Technical University in Vienna and attended the conservatory of the Society of Friends of Music located there. He began his career in Budapest in 1886, continued in Bolzano and Merano, moved on to Salzburg in 1887, and then to Karlovy Vary in 1888. He held a prominent position in Vienna's theater scene, especially performing operetta at the Deutsches Volkstheater in Vienna and the Theater an der Wien. In 1899, he was engaged at the Deutsches Schauspielhaus in Hamburg and subsequently moved to the Neues Theater. Beginning in 1892, he was married to Ella Funk (stage name: Erau).

In 1901, he performed the song "Und Meyer sieht mich freundlich an" ("And Meyer Looks Kindly at Me") at the Berlin cabaret Die bösen Buben, which was praised by Kurt Tucholsky as the "classical Berlin couplet". At the Metropol-Theater, he was the star of the "humoristic-satirical" annual revues written by Julius Freund with music by Victor Hollaender and Paul Lincke.

Giampietro did not shy away from new technical media for reproduction. He recorded gramophone records with songs from the revues and also appeared in films. A notable example is an early "sound picture" by German sound film pioneer Oskar Messter, in which Giampietro performed with Fritzi Massary.

He was buried in an honorary grave at the Hietzing Cemetery (Group 43, Number 40).

== Career ==
=== Recordings ===
The first records by Joseph Giampietro were released as early as 1899 in Vienna on Berliner Records. He later recorded for Beka (Berlin 1904), G&T (Berlin 1905–06), Odeon (Berlin 1906–11), Zonophone (Berlin 1910), and Gramophone (Berlin 1911). He also recorded Edison cylinders in Berlin in 1906.

=== Selected stage roles ===
- Hofmarschall Kalb ("Intrigue and Love")
- Philipp Moser ("Der Fleck auf der Ehre")
- Gelbhofbauer ("Die Kreuzelschreiber")
- Leonhard ("Maria Magdalena")
- First Cuirassier ("Wallenstein's Camp")

=== Revues at the Metropol-Theater, Berlin ===
- 1905: Die Herren vom Maxim
- 1906: Der Teufel lacht dazu
- 1908: Donnerwetter-tadellos!
- 1909: Hallo! – Die große Revue
- 1910: Hurra, wir leben noch!
- 1911: Die Nacht von Berlin
- 1912: Die Reise um die Erde in 40 Tagen (Spectacle piece, Jean Gilbert)

=== Filmography ===
- 1907: Komm du kleines Kohlenmädchen. Sound picture (with Fritzi Massary)
- 1909: Don Juan heiratet, also known as: Der Herzensknicker (Role: Don Juan)

== Bibliography ==
- Bemman, Helga (1981). Berliner Musenkinder – Memoiren. Eine heitere Chronik von 1900 bis 1930. Berlin (East): VEB Lied der Zeit Musikverlag.
- Eisenberg, Ludwig (1903). Großes biographisches Lexikon der Deutschen Bühne im XIX. Jahrhundert. Leipzig: Paul List. p. 324f.
- Jansen, Wolfgang (1985). Glanzrevuen der Zwanziger Jahre. Stätten der Geschichte Berlins. Vol. 25. Berlin: Edition Hentrich.
- Ristow, Günter (1964). Giampietro, Joseph. Neue Deutsche Biographie. Vol. 6. Berlin: Duncker & Humblot. p. 367. ISBN 3-428-00187-7.
- Schneidereit, Otto (1968). Berlin wie es weint und lacht. Spaziergänge durch Berlins Operettengeschichte. Berlin (East): VEB Lied der Zeit Musikverlag.
