= Josef Haubrich =

German lawyer and art collector

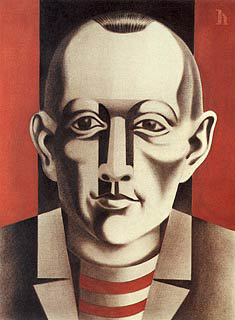
Portrait Dr. Josef Haubrich by Heinrich Hoerle (1931) in Museum Ludwig

Josef Haubrich (15 June 1889, in Cologne – 4 September 1961, in Bad Münstereifel) was a German lawyer and art collector.

== Life ==
On 2 May 1946 Josef donated the Sammlung Haubrich, a collection by lawyer of art from the years 1914 to 1939 to the city of Cologne. This included significant works by major German Expressionists such as Erich Heckel, Karl Schmidt-Rottluff, Ernst Ludwig Kirchner, August Macke and Otto Mueller. There were also works by other representatives of Classical Modernism such as Marc Chagall and Otto Dix as well as works by the Figurative Constructivists, many of whom came from Cologne. They now form a substantial part of the Museum Ludwig in Cologne.
