= Donna Roma =

- Country of origin: Germany

Donna Roma is a four-part mini-series thriller from director James Schäuffelen who plays in Italy or Germany. The first broadcast took place on 1 March 2007 on ZDF.

== Plot ==
The Commissioner Friederike Heise explains her case with analytical and forensic-psychological knowledge (Profiler) to murder, their causes are very difficult to determine. First, it is only because of the arranged assistance for very personal reasons, then later in Rome. Her partner, Chief Inspector Marcello Pascarella and they often get together once, anyway, or just feel attracted to each other and therefore form a good team of investigators.

== Episodes ==
1. Tödliche Kunst (Deadly Arts):The Berlin profiler Friederike Heisenberg traveled to Rome to help in solving a murder case, since she worked in Germany for quite some time on a similar case and it is likely the same offender. The police have a forgery of a famous painting by Polidoro da Caravaggio found, in which the face of the last victim was painted inside, apparently motivated a psychopathic act. The Italian Commissario Marcello Pascarella is initially very pleased to help. Since the reservation of the hotel does not work out as planned, she lives with Marcello. Finally they found a trace. A nurse has the venom with which the victims were a painful death, stolen from the hospital. He escaped and Frederike Marcello and is later found dead. Shortly before visiting professor Frederike still Tamburini, who will find a typical manuscript from the style of painting. He pretends to see nothing, for he himself is the "gifted" artist. By force of arms, he goes with it hidden in a side room. When Marcello, who has since come to the track Tamburini, and arrives in the meantime found Outbuildings Tamburini prompts you to ask yourself does this Frederike administer an overdose of nerve agent. Frederike can defend himself on the chair on which she is bound, such that Tamburini the poison injected himself and died instantly. As Frederike arrives back home, she finds her husband with one of his students in front of the bed.
2. Mord und Sühne (Murder and Punishment):Frederike will be offered a permanent position in Rome and so she goes there because it no longer holds in Berlin. Her daughter Sophie is also to Rome. Hardly arrived, there is a new case: a murdered drug is ritually laid out in a church. Frederike establishes a connection. Some years ago there was a similar case, there are only small differences in the details. The sexton and his daughter quickly come under suspicion of having anything to do with the murder. Another murder takes place and comes out later, that had been the victims of the former case, the other daughter of the sexton. Finally, for this murder.
3. Der Chiffre-Mörder (The Cipher-Killer):After it has now turned up and Friederike's man in Rome, he bring the housekeeper of Marcello to despair. But wait, a new case. In a burned building murder weapons were found, but still missing the victim. Finally, find out Frederike and Marcello, that it must have been some homeless people, because no one misses it. But the actor is so adept at that all the measures put him are unsuccessful. Meanwhile, another corpse is found: a homeless person again. This is already half decayed. Finally they found the culprit: It is the security guard.
4. Der Rächer (The Avengers):At a conference on forensic psychology, a leading forensic scientist is shot. The culprit seems to be an imitator in custody by a sedentary, Lars Keller to be. The government is due to this international incident, the police chief under pressure, what does this again with his team. As Lars Keller could have something to do with the murder, he will be flown to Rome. Although he tries to hide behind his smile and still collaborates very cooperative, he can be Frederike not be fooled, he already has two criminal psychologist on his conscience. By a simple trick he can flee and hide with a "friend". Now he wants revenge on Frederike who had holed it. He kidnapped Friederike man who was pulled out of boredom in the meantime to Rome. Keller asks Frederike without police protection to meet with him. It accepts it and manages to master the situation, as their Italian counterparts have remained inactive and could not even fix the basement and his accomplices. Frederike and her husband have now both emotionally apart and each with a different partner who is waiting for them.

== Cast ==
Actor	Role	Description
Jutta Speidel	Frederike Heise	Commissioner and principal analyst event (Profiler)
Luca Barbareschi	Marcello Pascarella	Commissioner
Annika Blendl	Sophie Heise	Daughter of Constantine and Frederike
Huub Stapel	Konstantin Heise	Husband of Frederike
Bruno Maccallini	Franko Nanini	Police officer / employee of the police
Gregor Törzs	Giovanni	Police officer / employee of the police
Valentina Lodovini	Angelina Puzzo	Police Trainee
Marco Morellini	Commissario	Chef Marcello, Franco, Giovanni, Angelina and Frederike
Nikolaus Paryla	Dr. Ernesto Ducati	Pathologist
Gianna Giachetti	Carla di Lorenzo	Housekeeper
Judith Rosmair	Margherita	Friend of Konstantin
