= All My Daughters =

- Also known as: All My Daughters
- Country of origin: Germany

Alle meine Töchter (All My Daughters) was a German drama television series which aired on ZDF between 1995 and 2001. It is based on a widowed judge Berthold Sanwaldt (Günter Mack), who lives with his three daughters, Anna, Sylvie, and youngest, Patty, in a Munich villa. 76 episodes were produced and a long sequence.

== Synopsis ==
Widowed judge Berthold Sanwaldt lives with his three daughters, Anna, Sylvie and baby Patty, in a villa in Munich. After the wedding of Berthold's sister-in-law Mathilde, Margot, who has just been released from prison, applies for the job of housekeeper. She served 15 years in prison for double murder, but maintains her innocence. Berthold, at the time an assessor at the trial, is the only one who believes her. The two fall in love and marry at the end of season 1.

== See also ==
- List of German television series
