= Peter Millowitsch =

German film and television actor (born 1949)

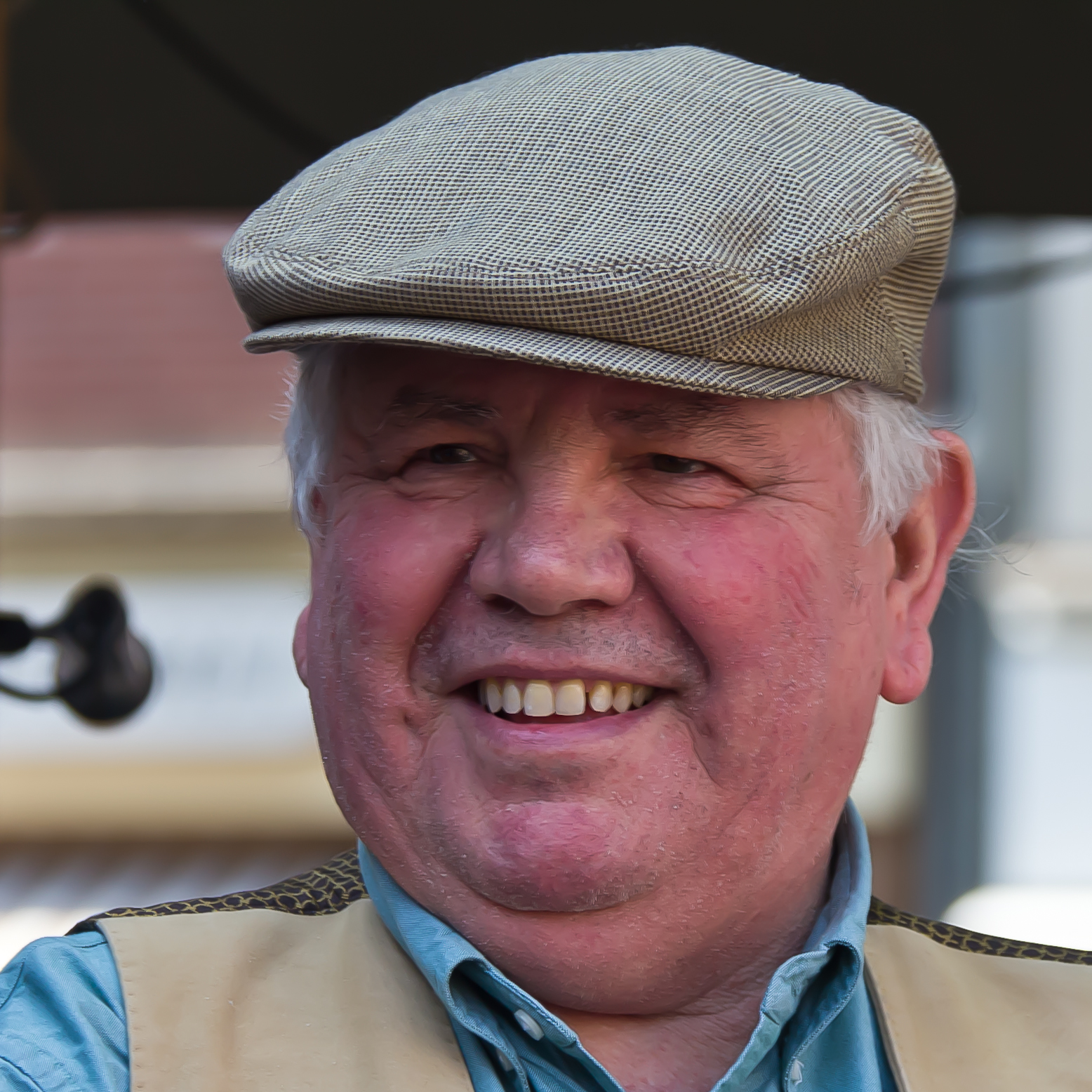
- Born: 1 February 1949 (age 77); Cologne, Germany
- Occupations: Film actor Television actor
- Years active: 1961 -

Peter Millowitsch is a German film and television actor. He was the director of the Volkstheater Millowitsch which he took over in 1999 following the death of his father Willy Millowitsch. His sister is the actress Mariele Millowitsch.

== Selected filmography ==
- The Heath is Green (1972)
- Old Barge, Young Love (1973)
- Schwarzwaldfahrt aus Liebeskummer (1974)
- The Secret Carrier (1975)

== Television roles ==
- Tatort
- ...und im Keller gärt es
