= SK Kölsch =

- Country of origin: Germany
- Original language: German
- No. of seasons: 7
- No. of episodes: 81

Production
- Running time: 45 minutes

Original release
- Network: Sat.1
- Release: 1999 – 2006

SK Kölsch was German television series produced in Cologne, which was broadcast on Sat.1 from 1999 to 2006.

== See also ==
- List of German television series
