= Die Familienanwältin =

- Country of origin: Germany

Original release
- Release: 2006 – 2007

Die Familienanwältin (English: The Family Lawyer) is a German television series.

== Storyline ==
Hanna Lorenz, a lawyer, lives with her husband Robert and their two teenage children, Charlotte and Patrick. She and Robert jointly run a law firm, and Hanna perceives her life as perfectly ideal and stable. This perception changes when she discovers that Robert has been in a decade-long relationship with their colleague Bettina and is now leaving her. Additionally, Robert has diverted funds from the business, leaving Hanna with an almost empty bank account.

As the ensuing divorce proceeds, Hanna begins reassessing her personal life. She becomes aware of the difficulties her daughter Charlotte has been experiencing and recognises her limited involvement in Patrick's life, especially when he expresses a desire to live with his father. Despite these challenges, Hanna successfully establishes a new law firm, though the swift setup results in an unconventional team of colleagues. Specialising in family law, Hanna draws on her personal experiences to approach her cases, despite the complexities of her own situation.

== Episodes ==
=== First Season ===
| Episode number | Episode Title | First Broadcast |
|---|---|---|
| 01 | Evas Kinder (en: Eva's Children) | 14. March 2006 |
| 02 | Mutterliebe (en: Mother's Love) | 21. March 2006 |
| 03 | Hunger (en: Hunger) | 28. March 2006 |
| 04 | Ramba Zamba (en: Ramba Zamba) | 4. April 2006 |
| 05 | Die Überlebende (en: The Survivor) | 11. April 2006 |
| 06 | Hinter dem Spiegel (en: Behind the Mirror) | 18. April 2006 |
| 07 | 20 Minuten (en: 20 Minutes) | 25. April 2006 |
| 08 | Klara (en: Klara) | 2. May 2006 |

=== Second Season ===
| Episode number | Episode Title | First Broadcast | Source |
|---|---|---|---|
| 01 | Familienbande (en: Family Ties) | 19. February 2007 | |
| 02 | Die Beschneidung (en: The Circumcision) | 26. February 2007 | |
| 03 | Leben & Sterben (en: Living & Dying) | RTLnow (from December 2009) | |
| 04 | Böses Blut (en: Bad Blood) | RTLnow (from December 2009) | |
| 05 | Das Adoptivkind (en: The Adopted Child) | RTLnow (from December 2009) | |
| 06 | Ehrensache (en: Matter of honour) | RTLnow (from December 2009) | |
| 07 | Ferner Donner (en: Further Thunder) | RTLnow (from December 2009) | |
| 08 | Amok (en: Amok) | RTLnow (from December 2009) | |

== Production and broadcast notes ==
- Filming for the first season began on the 30th of June 2005 and ended in November of the same year. The first season was aired from the 14th of March to the 2nd of May 2006 on Tuesday evenings at 21:15. The first season received a market share of 16.5 per cent on average.
- The second series underwent production from July to December 2006 in Cologne and nearby surroundings. It consists of eight episodes. Due to low ratings, only two episodes were broadcast on Mondays at 21:15. The previously unaired remaining episodes were aired in 2009 on RTLnow.

== Ratings ==
| Season | Episode | Date | Viewers | | Market share | | Source |
| Season | Episode | Date | Total | 14 to 49 years | Total | 14 to 49 years | Source |
|---|---|---|---|---|---|---|---|
| 1 | 1 | 14. March 2006 | 5.21 million | 2.82 million | 16.3% | 20.5% | |
| 1 | 2 | 21. March 2006 | 4.13 million | 1.51 million | 12.8% | 15.5% | |
| 1 | 3 | 28. March 2006 | 4.86 million | 2.38 million | 14.4% | 17.1% | |
| 1 | 5 | 11. April 2006 | 3.57 million | 1.90 million | 11.2% | 14.4% | |
| 1 | 6 | 18. April 2006 | 4.43 million | 2.51 million | 13.8% | 18.7% | |
| 1 | 8 | 2. May 2006 | 3.79 million | - | - | 15.2% | |
| 2 | 1 | 19. February 2007 | 3.12 million | 1.36 million | 9.5% | 10.3% | |
| 2 | 2 | 26. February 2007 | - | - | - | 8.8% | |

== Awards ==
The series was nominated for the German Television Award in 2006 in the category Best Series.

== See also ==
- List of German television series
