= Willy Millowitsch =

German actor (1909-1999)

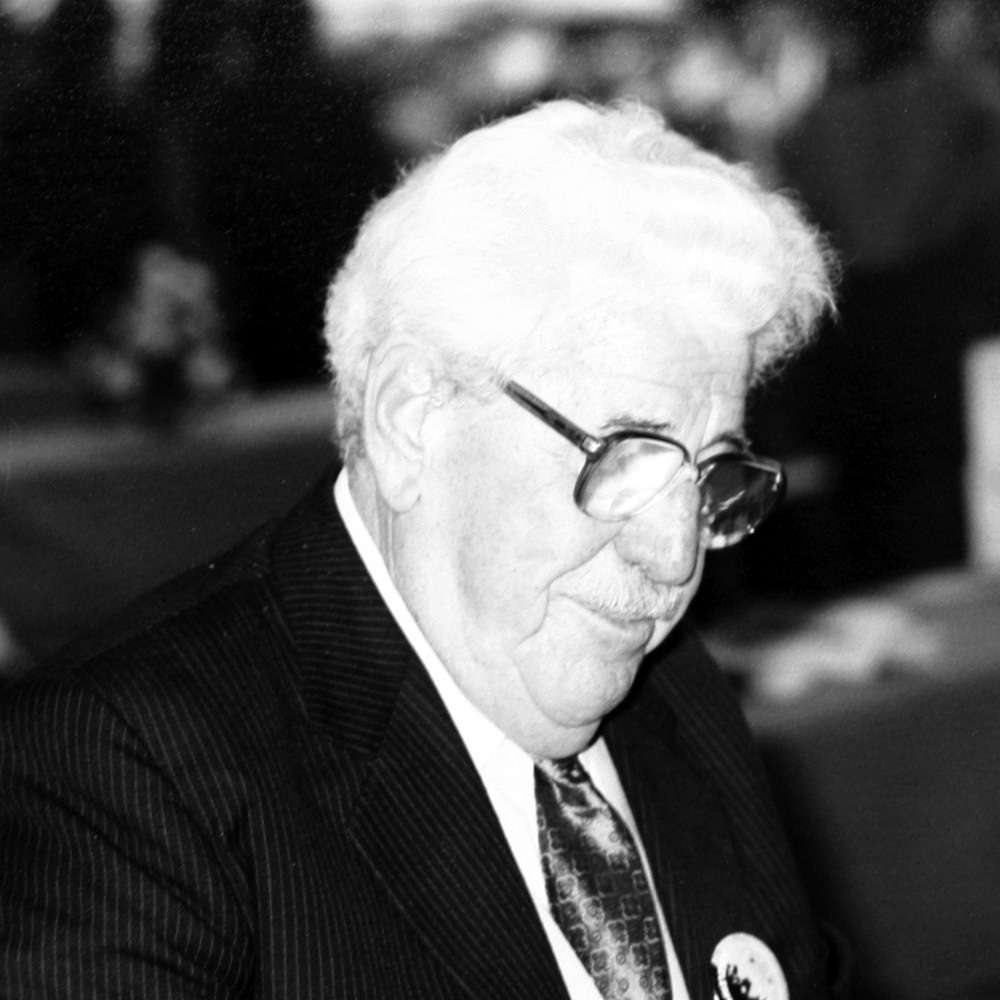
- Millowitsch in 1987
- Born: 8 January 1909; Cologne, Rhine Province, Kingdom of Prussia, German Empire
- Died: 20 September 1999 (aged 90); Cologne, North Rhine-Westphalia, Germany

Willy Millowitsch (German: [ˈvɪli ˈmɪlovɪtʃ], Colognian: [ˈvɪ̂li ˈmɪ́lovetʃ]; 8 January 1909 – 20 September 1999) was a German stage and TV actor and the director of the Volkstheater Millowitsch in Cologne.

== Early life ==
Millowitsch was born in Cologne, Rhine Province. His parents were Peter and Käthe Millowitsch and came from a long family tradition of engagement with the theater which can be traced back to 1792. It was not until 1895 however, that Millowitsch's grandfather stopped using puppets and resorted to real actors instead.

Millowitsch was interested in theater at an early age and took to the stage for the first time in 1922 at just 13. He quit school without a degree to pursue his acting career full-time. At first he worked under the auspices of his father who had to give up his theater after the inflation hit. This forced them to go on tour in and around Cologne until they got a permanent theater in 1936, the now famous Volkstheater Millowitsch, which Willy took over from his father in 1940. In 1939 he married his first wife Lini Lüttgen, but they got divorced soon after.

During World War II, the theater was damaged, but not severely, and by October 1945 it was fully restored, owing to the support of mayor and later German chancellor, Konrad Adenauer, who proclaimed that the people need something to laugh about again. Consequently, in the time from 1945 to 1949 there were daily performances in the theater. It was during this time that he met his second wife, Gerda Millowitsch, formerly Feldhoff.

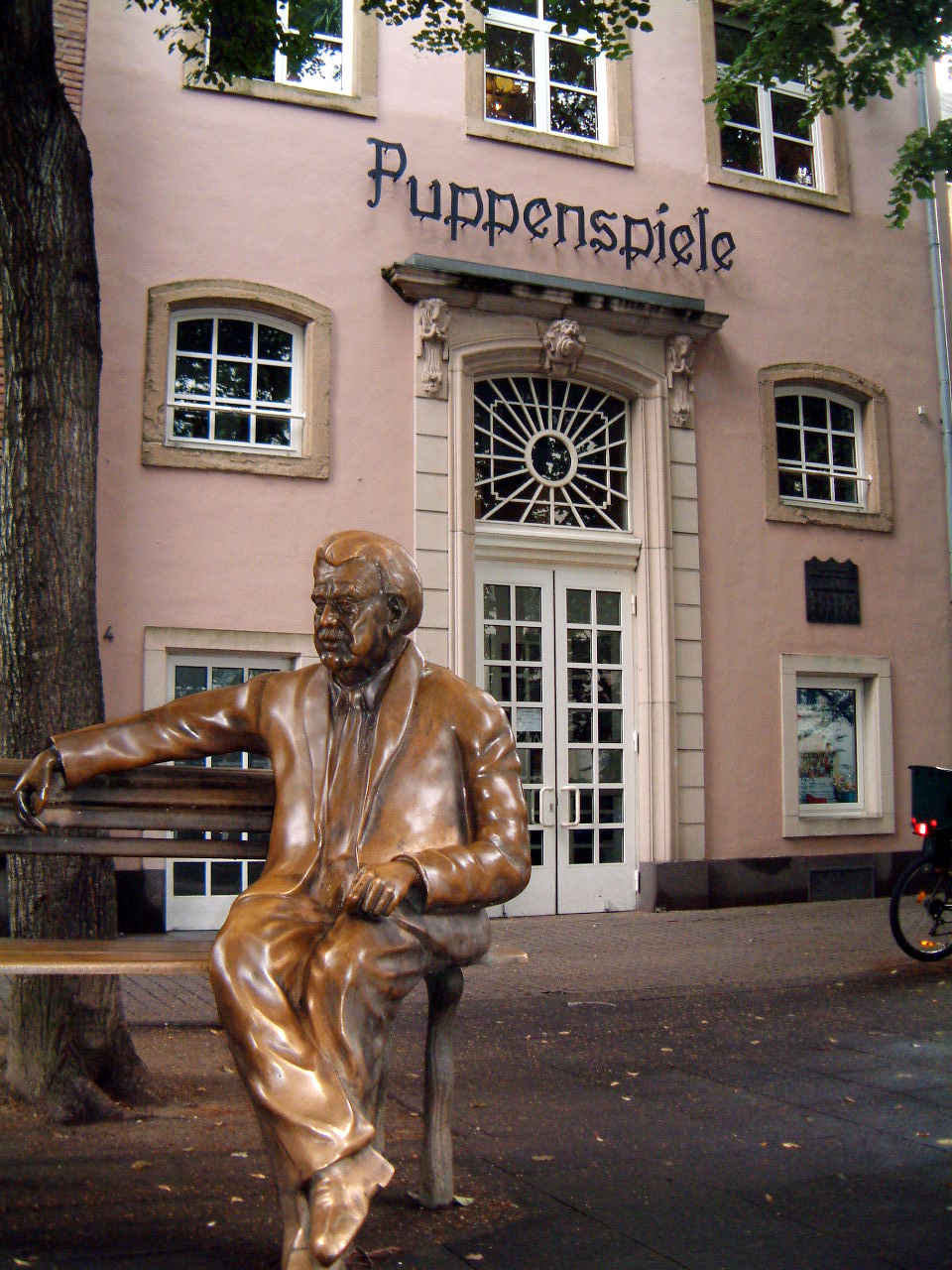
Willy-Millowitsch-monument in front of the Hänneschen-Theater

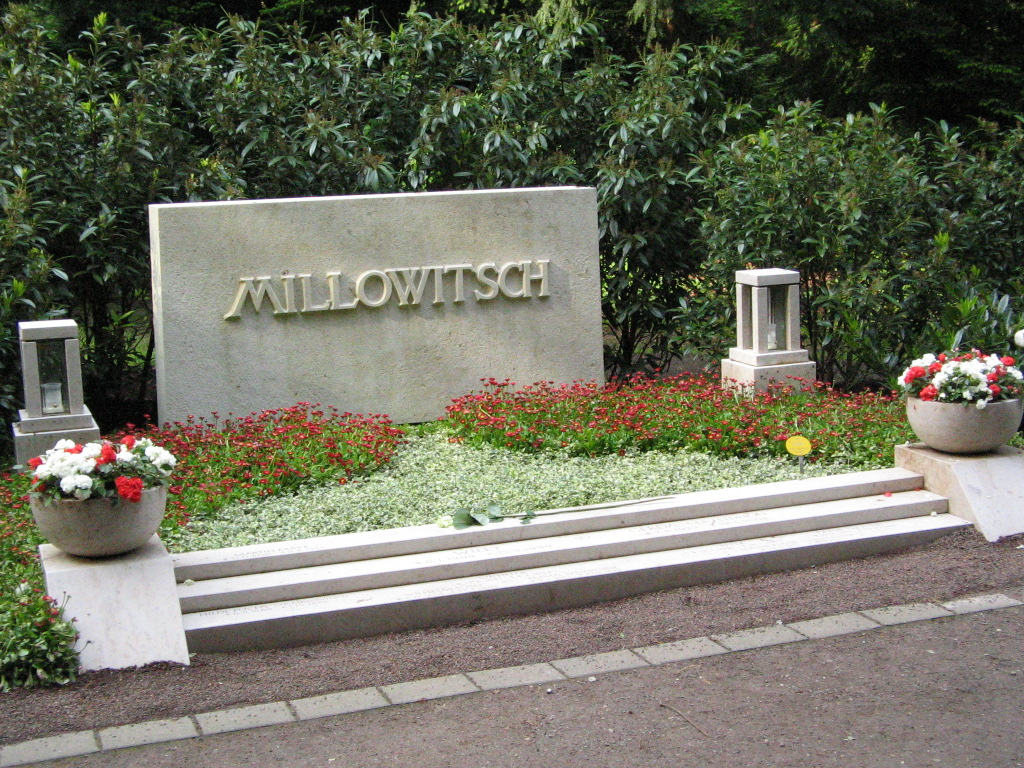
Family grave

== Career ==
In 1949, when the postwar theater euphoria died down, Millowitsch focused on his film and television career and in 1949 his first film (Search for Majora, directed by Hermann Pfeiffer) was released. Many more were to follow. He did not content himself just transferring from one medium to the other, but brought the theater with him. On 27 October 1953 the Kölsch dialect play Der Etappenhase was broadcast on the Western regional channel WDR, the first live broadcast of a theatrical performance with real audience in German television history. Despite bitter criticism of the entry of low 'folk culture' into television by the director of the Nordwestdeutscher Rundfunk, Adolf Grimme, it was an instant success. This remains one of Millowitsch's most popular plays and has been performed more than 1,000 times. Der Etappenhase was so popular that just six weeks later it was broadcast again, live from the Volkstheater.

He continued to put on television plays that were instant successes, gaining national popularity. It is in great part Millowitsch's achievement to have popularized Kölsch throughout Germany. People were now associating the Rhinelander with a relaxed lifestyle and genial humor. Theaters from other dialectal areas scrambled to catch up with him and soon the dialect theater became an important part of the German television landscape.

With the success of these plays on television, interest in theater gradually increased and by the 1960s flocks of people took to the theater again to witness performance of Millowitsch's popular plays first hand. Until the beginning of the 1960s Millowitsch had to rent out his theater now and again, but with the arrival of the new crowds Millowitsch could afford to concentrate his career on theater from then on. He renovated the theater in 1967 and the Volkstheater once again became a focal point of local culture, and many young dialect artists started their careers there.

Throughout the 1970s, Millowitsch stuck to the folk theater, and it wasn't until the end of the 1980s that he also turned back to television and took the title role in a detective series as Kommissar Klefisch, whom he played until 1996. His most notable role internationally is in the 1985 Chevy Chase movie National Lampoon's European Vacation, where he and his on-screen wife are mistaken for relatives of the Griswold family in Germany. Aside from his theatrical merits, he also wrote classic popular folk songs, such as Schnaps, das war sein letztes Wort and Wir sind alle kleine Sünderlein. He also embraced political causes and in 1992 he participated in the important anti-Nazi campaign, Arsch huh, Zäng ussenander (Kölsch, meaning: Move your butts and pipe up!), which culminated in a major concert by local acts attended by 100,000 people at Cologne's Chlodwigplatz.

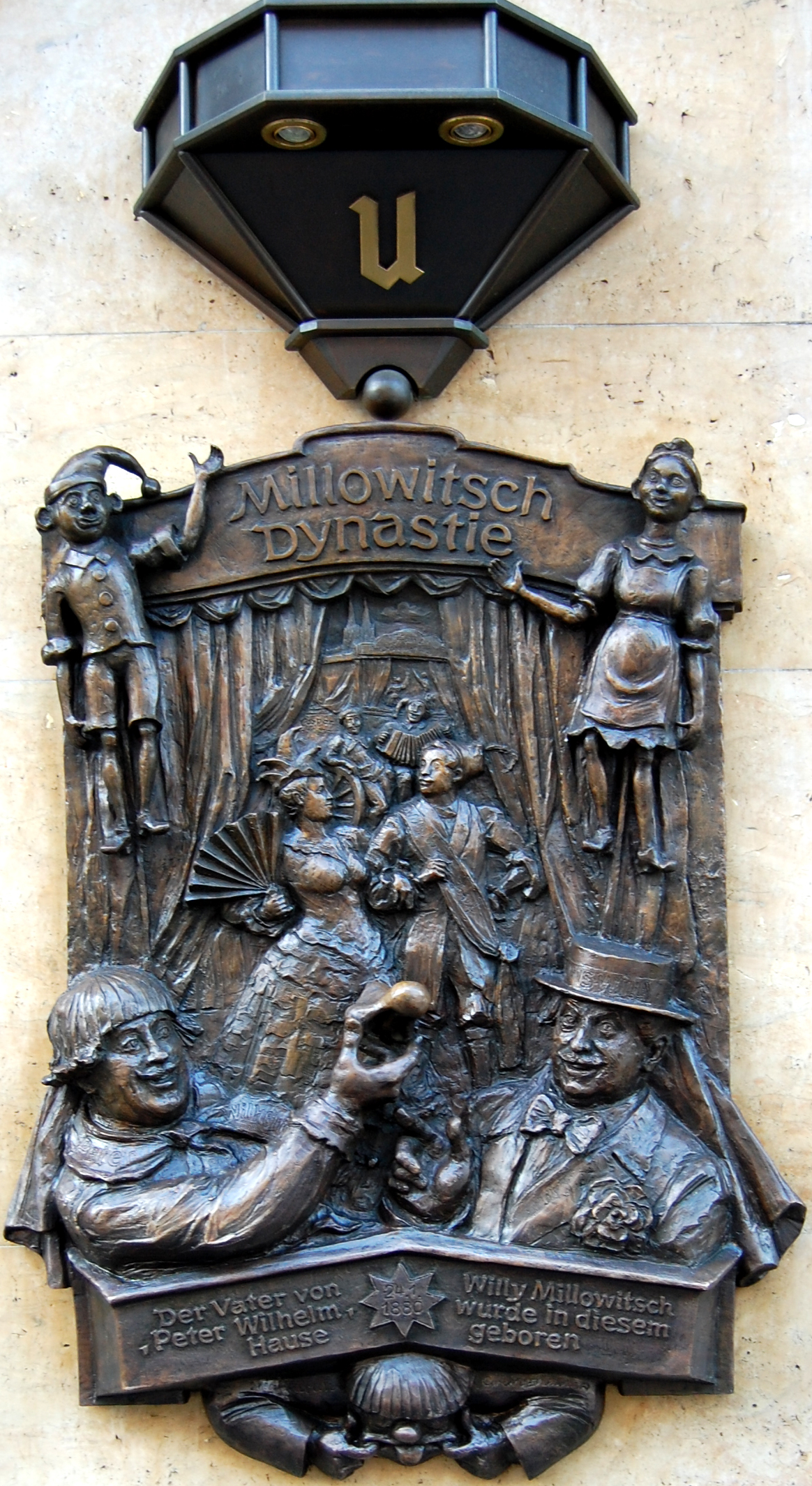
Commemorative plaque Millowitsch-dynasty Düsseldorf-Altstadt at Uerige Brewery

== Death and legacy ==
In 1989, the city of Cologne conferred honorary citizenship on to Millowitsch, which is a very exclusive honor in Germany. He celebrated his 90th birthday on 8 January 1999, with 18,000 fans at a sold-out event at the Kölnarena and told people all he wanted for his birthday was to stay healthy. However, he died of heart failure on 20 September that year.

Two of his four children, Peter Millowitsch, who is now the director of the Volkstheater, and Mariele Millowitsch have continued the family tradition and have both become successful actors. The city of Cologne has named a square near the Millowitsch theater Willy-Millowitsch-Platz in his honor.

== Selected filmography ==
- Search for Majora (1949)
- Madonna in Chains (1949)
- The Tiger Akbar (1951)
- Operation Sleeping Bag (1955)
- Love, Girls and Soldiers (1958)
- Father, Mother and Nine Children (1958)
- Every Day Isn't Sunday (1959)
- Two Hearts in May (1958)
- The True Jacob (1960)
- Robert and Bertram (1961)
- Die Fledermaus (1962)
- The Gypsy Baron (1962)
- Donaugeschichten (1965–1970, TV series, 26 episodes)
- Charley's Uncle (1969)
- The Merry Quartet from the Filling Station (1972)
- Old Barge, Young Love (1973)
- The Secret Carrier (1975)
- Oh, This Father (1978–1981, TV series, 26 episodes)
- National Lampoon's European Vacation (1985)
- Pizza Colonia (1991)
