= Volkstheater Millowitsch =

Theatre in Cologne

Millowitsch Theater
- Volkstheater Millowitsch
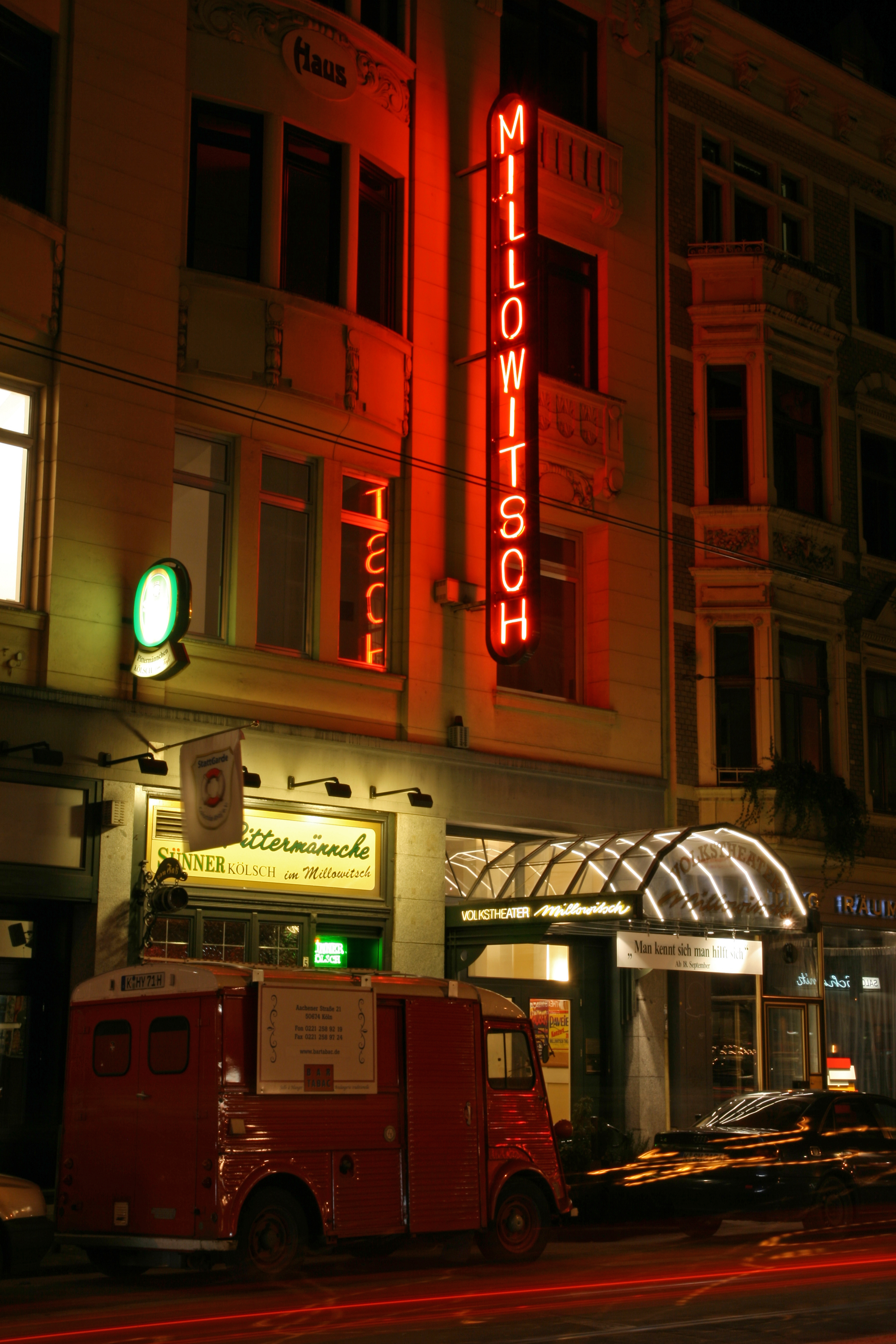
- Millowitsch-Theater in Cologne
- Interactive map of Millowitsch Theater
- Address: Aachener Straße 5 Cologne; Germany
- Coordinates: 50°56′11″N 6°56′13″E
- Owner: Millowitsch family
- Type: Theatre
- Capacity: 383

Construction
- Opened: 1936
- Reopened: 16 September 1945
- Years active: 1936–present

The Volkstheater Millowitsch, also known as the Millowitsch-Theater, was a medium-sized theatre in Cologne, Germany where popular, low-brow comedies were performed.

== History ==
The Millowitsch family had been active in theatre before ownership of this building with a tradition dating back to 1792. With the onset of the Great Depression and the ensuing inflation, Peter Millowitsch was forced to abandon the family’s old theatre and tour Cologne and the surrounding area, until in 1936 they finally moved into the new theatre in Aachener Straße.

In 1940 Willy Millowitsch took charge of the theatre. During World War II it was damaged, but not too severely, so on September 16, 1945, the theatre was reopened. In the time from 1945–1949 there were daily performances in the theatre, but afterwards the attendance dropped and Millowitsch had to rent out the theatre sometimes. Fortunately, the building doubled as a cinema, so he could still make money with it.

The first live broadcast of a theatrical performance in front of a real audience on German television took place in this theatre. On October 27, 1953 Willy Millowitsch’s Kölsch dialect play Der Etappenhas was broadcast on the Western regional channel WDR. It was immensely successful and just six weeks later was broadcast again, live, from the Millowitsch-Theater. Over the course of the years, over one hundred performances from the Volkstheater Millowitsch were shown on television.

The television plays spawned interest in theatre and the audiences gradually grew and by the 1960s a steady flow of people were teeming in to see Millowitsch’s plays firsthand. He renovated the building in 1967 and the Volkstheater once again became a focal point of local culture. Changing his original concept, Millowitsch turned the theatre from a house just for plays into a venue for local performances of all kinds. Many young dialect artists started their careers there, including the now famous singing groups Bläck Fööss and Höhner.

In 1998 only few months before Willy Millowitsch’s death in 1999, his son Peter Millowitsch took over the running of the establishment.

== Location ==
The Millowitsch-Theater is located at Aachener Straße 5, near the Hahnentor and Rudolfplatz in the centre of Cologne, just by the tramline. It is a medium-sized theatre that can seat up to 383 people. Ticket prices usually range from €19 – €24.
