= Neue Geschichten vom Pumuckl =

- Logo Neue Geschichten vom Pumuckl
- Neue Geschichten vom Pumuckl
- Genre: Family series
- Based on: Meister Eder und sein Pumuckl by Ellis Kaut
- Written by: Korbinian Dufter; Matthias Pacht; Moritz Binder; Katharina Köster
- Directed by: Marcus H. Rosenmüller
- Starring: Florian Brückner: Florian Eder; Maxi Schafroth: Pumuckls Stimme; Hans Clarin: Pumuckls Stimme (KI-Sprachsynthese); Ina Meling: Bärbel Eder; Ilse Neubauer: Frau Stürtzlinger; Frederic Linkemann: Michi; Matthias Bundschuh: Lothar Hermann Burke; Maya Reschke: Sophie Klingemann; Jamily Göppel: Charly Klingemann; Tim Koch: Freddy; Anja Knauer: Vicky; Mira Mazumdar: Klara Meindl; Gundi Ellert: Martha; Juliane Dinnebier: Sarah; Alexander Schubert: Herr Klingemann; Dela Dabulamanzi: Frau Klingemann; Herman van Ulzen: Herr Sorgichev; Andreja Schneider: Danka; Eko Fresh: Paket-Bote; Emilia Lauterbach: Johanna
- Country of origin: Germany
- Original language: German

Original release
- Network: RTL+
- Release: 2023

Neue Geschichten vom Pumuckl (in English: New Stories from Pumuckl) is a German family television series based on the Meister Eder und sein Pumuckl series created by Ellis Kaut. Under the direction of Marcus H. Rosenmüller, a first season containing 13 episodes was created which was filmed in Munich and the surrounding area in the summer of 2022 and was released on RTL+ on December 11, 2023. The premiere was at the end of June 2023 as part of the Munich Film Festival, where the production was awarded the Audience Award of the Kinderfilmfest. From October 26, 2023, the first three episodes were shown in selected cinemas for a short time. On December 25 and 26, 2023, both RTL and ORF 1 showed all episodes on linear television.

The story takes place thirty years after the original series by Ulrich König and ignores the content of its largely unpopular successors Pumuckls Abenteuer (1999) and Pumuckl und sein Zirkusabenteuer (2003). Florian Brückner plays carpenter Florian Eder, the nephew of master carpenter Franz Eder, played by Gustl Bayrhammer, who takes over his uncle's abandoned carpentry shop 30 years after his uncle's death and meets the Leprechaun Pumuckl there.

In the new series, Pumuckl is voiced by cabaret artist Maxi Schafroth. Using artificial intelligence, Schafroth's sound recordings are converted into the voice of the original speaker Hans Clarin, who died in 2005. The original voice of Pumuckl is thus synthetically recreated using modern audio deepfake technology.

Two voice versions of the series were released in parallel on RTL+. The first version uses Hans Clarin's technically reconstructed voice, while the other version contains Schafroth's unedited recordings.

== Production ==
NEUESUPER GmbH approached the Pumuckl heirs and acquired the rights for a remake. Uschi Bagnall, Ellis Kaut's daughter, expressed concerns that Pumuckl was being distorted and modernized too much. She cited the new Maya the Bee as a negative example, but was very satisfied with the realization and praised Brückner's performance as Eder.

According to screenwriter Korbinian Dufter (MUH - Bayerische Aspekte, Winter 2022/23), the "core of Pumuckl" should be preserved, which is why the depiction of modern technology, such as cell phones or drones, should be largely dispensed with in a Munich "that has changed a bit after all". For this desired "timelessness", practical effects should be used to a large extent and the animations should also follow suit. He named the workshop in the backyard as the supporting pillar. However, the actual building in the backyard of Widenmayerstraße 2 in Munich was demolished after the filming of the second season of Meister Eder und sein Pumuckl in 1985. The entire workshop and backyard were therefore recreated one-to-one and furnished true to the original. This set was located in an old Munich industrial hall and was dismantled and stored after filming was completed.

The series tells completely new stories that are not based on an original by Ellis Kaut. In addition to light-hearted episodes, others deal with more serious topics and "get down to business", according to Dufter, as today's children are expected to do more. The focus is still on the friendship between Eder and Pumuckl and how a goblin sees today's world through his eyes.

As one of the few surviving, returning actresses from the original series, Ilse Neubauer reprises her role as Mrs. Stürtzlinger. Looking at the set, she said: "It's like traveling back in time forty years and standing in this workshop again."

== Actors ==
In addition to Florian Brückner as Florian Eder and Ilse Neubauer as Mrs. Stürtzlinger, Milan Peschel, Frederic Linkemann, Katharina Thalbach and Teresa Rizos played recurring roles in the New Tales of Pumuckl. Markus Krojer (as Olaf Bahnmüller), Johann Schuler, Ina Meling (as Bärbel Eder), Hanna Plaß (as Steffi Bahnmüller), Anja Knauer, Simon Pearce, Martin Weinek, Michael Ostrowski, Franz-Xaver Zeller and Arnd Schimkat (as Mr. Wümmerlein) are known as guests. Max von Thun can also be seen as a policeman.

== List of episodes ==
All episodes were released in advance on December 11, 2023, on the RTL+ streaming portal.

=== Season 01 ===
All episodes were released on RTL+ on December 11, 2023.

No.	Title	Directed by	Written by	Original release date
1	"Leprechaun law" (German: Koboldsgesetz)	Marcus H. Rosenmüller	Korbinian Dufter Matthias Pacht Moritz Binder Katharina Köster	December 25, 2023
Carpenter Florian Eder and his sister Bärbel inherit the old workshop of their deceased uncle Franz Eder. When Florian takes over the workshop, he meets Pumuckl the goblin when he gets stuck on a glue pot...again.
2	"Pumuckl is given away" (German: Pumuckl wird verschenkt)	Marcus H. Rosenmüller	Korbinian Dufter Matthias Pacht Moritz Binder Katharina Köster	December 25, 2023
When Pumuckl, out of curiosity, climbs into a parcel that Eder is taking to his neighbors, he has to find the goblin in the middle of a children's birthday party.
3	"The old Eder" (German: Der alte Eder)	Marcus H. Rosenmüller	Korbinian Dufter Matthias Pacht Moritz Binder Katharina Köster	December 25, 2023
When Pumuckl finds old master Eder's glasses in the workshop, he has to come to terms with his death and visits his grave with Florian, where he has to learn what it really means when someone is dead.
4	"The darn chewing gum" (German: Der verflixte Kaugummi)	Marcus H. Rosenmüller	Korbinian Dufter Matthias Pacht Moritz Binder Katharina Köster	December 25, 2023
When Pumuckl accidentally damages a little girl's doll, the attempt to undo the damage leads to an escalation of further unintentional disfigurements, which Florian has to pay for.
5	"Eder is to blame for everything" (German: Eder ist an allem Schuld)	Marcus H. Rosenmüller	Korbinian Dufter Matthias Pacht Moritz Binder Katharina Köster	December 25, 2023
When the children clash with one of the grumpy neighbors in the neighborhood, they unknowingly receive support from Pumuckl.
6	"Pumuckl and the birthday surprise" (German: Pumuckl und die Geburtstagsüberraschung)	Marcus H. Rosenmüller	Korbinian Dufter Matthias Pacht Moritz Binder Katharina Köster	December 25, 2023
While trying to prepare a birthday surprise for Florian, things unintentionally go wrong for Pumuckl.
7	"Pumuckl goes fishing" (German: Pumuckl geht angeln)	Marcus H. Rosenmüller	Korbinian Dufter Matthias Pacht Moritz Binder Katharina Köster	December 25, 2023
Pumuckl and Florian go fishing one fine afternoon. However, the day goes against their expectations.
8	"Pumuckl is enchanted" (German: Pumuckl wird verzaubert)	Marcus H. Rosenmüller	Korbinian Dufter Matthias Pacht Moritz Binder Katharina Köster	December 25, 2023
When Pumuckl can no longer become invisible due to unclear circumstances, the Leprechaun wonders whether he might have been enchanted.
9	"Workshop in danger" (German: Werkstatt in Gefahr)	Marcus H. Rosenmüller	Korbinian Dufter Matthias Pacht Moritz Binder Katharina Köster	December 25, 2023
When the trade inspectorate arrives unannounced at the workshop, Florian has a hard time keeping Pumuckl in check.
10	"Pumuckl and the horse from the Nile" (German: Pumuckl und das Pferd vom Nil)	Marcus H. Rosenmüller	Korbinian Dufter Matthias Pacht Moritz Binder Katharina Köster	December 25, 2023
When Florian has to look after a friend's children and Pumuckl accompanies him, things get out of hand that evening.
11	"Pumuckl and the Spider" (German: Pumuckl und die Spinne)	Marcus H. Rosenmüller	Korbinian Dufter Matthias Pacht Moritz Binder Katharina Köster	December 25, 2023
Florian is on a date with his childhood sweetheart Franziska, but this is abruptly complicated by Pumuckl when he discovers a spider in the workshop.
12	"Pumuckl wants to go skiing" (German: Pumuckl will Skifahren)	Marcus H. Rosenmüller	Korbinian Dufter Matthias Pacht Moritz Binder Katharina Köster	December 25, 2023
When Pumuckl misplaces the alarm clock, he and Florian miss the planned ski trip.
13	"Pumuckl celebrates New Year's Eve" (German: Pumuckl feiert Silvester)	Marcus H. Rosenmüller	Korbinian Dufter Matthias Pacht Moritz Binder Katharina Köster	December 25, 2023
Florian promises Pumuckl that he will celebrate the New Year with him alone and in peace. However, when Florian is unexpectedly invited to a party by friends, Pumuckl doesn't like it at all.

== Documentary ==
- The two-part documentary Aus dem Leben eines Kobolds (directed by Antonia Simm), which was produced in 2022, will accompany the new edition on RTL+.

== Trivia ==
- Although Florian Eder is a new relative for Franz Eder created for this series, his sister, Bärbel originates from the old series. The young version of the character appeared in the episodes "Eder receives visitors" and "Pumuckl and the Easter Eggs". She also knew Pumuckl's existence as Master Eder told her about it, and treated Pumuckl kindly despite that she couldn't see him, causing Pumuckl to develop a crush on her.
- At the beginning of the series, Florian and Bärbel Eder want to sell the workshop. In episode 47 of the original series, "Playing with Fire", Franz Eder tells the police that he is the tenant of the house.
- In contrast to the original series, the visible goblin always casts a visible shadow.
- An old cigar box labeled "Al Capone" can be seen in the workshop in the episode Leprechaun Law. In the original series, Master Eder kept nails in this wooden box in episode 45 "Pumuckl wants to become a carpenter".
- In the episode "The old Eder", Ms. Stürtzlinger mentions several acquaintances of Franz Eder from the original series who (like her actors) have also passed away in the meantime. She mentions the master locksmith Bernbacher (Willy Harlander), Eder's regular table friend Mr. Schwertfeger (Hans Stadtmüller), the Countess (Gisela Uhlen) and the janitor Stürtzlinger (Werner Zeussel).
- A newspaper article about Master Eder with the headline "Carved from good wood" can be seen in The old Eder in the Workshop. The article was written by the journalist who visited Eder's workshop in the old series (episode 43 A scoop for the newspaper) and is about the mysterious phenomena that occurred during her visit in that episode.
- In the episode "The old Eder", Florian Eder and Pumuckl visit the grave of Master Eder. According to the inscription on the grave cross, Franz Eder lived from January 5, 1921, to September 24, 1992, making him 71 years old - just like his actor Gustl Bayrhammer (February 12, 1922 to April 24, 1993). At the same time, the inscription's date of birth is a contradiction to the previous series, as Master Eder had the zodiac sign Aquarius, as his cleaning lady Mrs. Eichinger repeatedly emphasized. If the inscription on the grave cross is to be believed, however, he would have been a Capricorn. In the same episode, Pumuckl answers the question of what he has been doing for the past 30 years after Master Eder's death with "Leprechaun work".
- The scenes at Master Eder's grave in the episode Der alte Eder were filmed at the Old Perlach Cemetery in Munich. Gustl Bayrhammer's real grave, on the other hand, is located in the cemetery of his long-time home in Krailling in the district of Starnberg.
- Like the original series, the series contains several recurring jokes. Some are taken from the original series, such as the wooden slats falling over next to the door or Pumuckl's invented fantasy numbers, but new ones have also been established. For example, the door handle at the entrance to the workshop falls off several times. The parcel carrier mistakenly addresses Florian Eder as "Mr. Ederer". This is an allusion to episode 4 of the old series The castle ghost, in which the butler always calls Master Eder Ederer. Florian Eder is also told by several visitors that the potted plant in the workshop urgently needs watering.
- In the episode "Pumuckl and the Birthday Surprise", Pumuckl uses his silver-grey toy car, which he received as a gift from Master Eder in episode 27 of the original series, "The Toy Car".
- In the episode "Pumuckl and the birthday surprise", Florian Eder receives a birthday card. The envelope is addressed to the Dufter family, Breisacher Straße 13, 50321 Hamburg. However, the zip code 50321 belongs to the town of Brühl in North Rhine-Westphalia, known nationwide for its Phantasialand theme park. The address on the envelope is Widenmayerstraße 2, 80538 Munich, which corresponds to the former filming location of the old series. In the old series, however, in episode 44 Pumuckl answers the phone, Gewürzmühlstraße 6 (Munich) was mentioned as the address of the carpenter's workshop.
- At the end of the episode "Pumuckl celebrates New Year's Eve", Pumuckl calls Florian Eder "Master Eder", just as he did with Franz Eder in the original series. Before that, he always addresses him simply as "Eder".

== Reception ==
Maximilian Schröter rated the series on film-rezensionen.de with nine out of ten points, from the setting to the voice of the main character, Pumuckl's world has been lovingly brought back to television here.

The first broadcast on RTL was watched by up to around 1.9 million viewers, with a market share of between 11.2 and 13.3 percent.

== Awards ==
- Filmfest München 2023
  - Publikumspreis des Kinderfilmfests
