= Pumuckls Abenteuer =

- Based on: Meister Eder und sein Pumuckl by Ellis Kaut
- Country of origin: Germany
- No. of seasons: 1
- No. of episodes: 13

Production
- Running time: 25

Original release
- Network: KiKa
- Release: 30 August – 15 September 1999

Pumuckls Abenteuer (Pumuckl's Adventures) is a German television series. It is based on the fictional character Pumuckl created by Ellis Kaut. It is a sequel series to 1980s TV series Meister Eder und sein Pumuckl (Master [carpenter] Eder and his Pumuckl) and the cinematic movie Pumuckl und der blaue Klabauter (Pumuckl and the blue Klabauter). Gustl Bayrhammer, who played Meister Eder in the first series, died in 1993; rather than recast his role, the producers decided to feature characters which had been introduced in the movie, making the movie sort of a pilot to this series, bridging the gap between the events of first series and this one.

== Plot ==
The show centers around the Kobold Pumuckl, a descendant of the Klabautermänner. He is invisible to people around him except for chef Odessi (Towje Kleiner) with whom Pumuckl lives, since he left his friend master carpenter Eder (Gustl Bayrhammer) during the events of the 1994 cinematric movie Pumuckl und der blaue Klabauter (Pumuckl and the blue Klabauter).

== Characters ==
- Pumuckl is the main protagonist of the series. He is invisible when people other than Odessi are around. He is still very cheeky and immature.
- Odessi is now, after Meister Eder's death, the only human who is able to see Pumuckl. He is a chef on a ship. He is usually from Munich, but decided to go to the sea. He also loves singing. His parents are from Sicily so he speaks Italian fluently and also sings all of his songs in Italian. His slogan is "Es kommt, wie es kommen muss." ("It comes as it must").
- Willibald is an older mariner and Willibald's best human friend. He strictly believes in the position of the stars, a bit like Mrs. Eichinger from the first two seasons. He first does not believe in Pumuckl's existence, but after Pumuckl keeps untying his shoelace, he has to admit that he does exist. He also has a parrot called Lilalora, however, she is only able to say her name as well as "Aye aye Kapitän!" He quickly starts to like Pumuckl and when Odessi leaves, he is very upset and asks Odessi if he at least could leave Pumuckl on the ship, however, Pumuckl decides to stay with Odessi. One of his biggest wishes is to be able to see Pumuckl. So, in the end, Odessi decides to make a photo of Pumuckl. However, even on the photo he is only visible to Odessi, but not to Willibald. Willibald is very disappointed about that. He is performed by Wolfgang Völz
- Paul is the ship's helmsman and operator. He is very keen in electronic stuff and even built an alarm system for the ship. He also loves taking photos. However, his weakness is his arrogance and impatience. Unlike Willibald, he refuses to believe in klabauters until the end. In the end however, even he gets emotional when Odessi leaves and hugs him.
- Peter is the ship's captain. His first name gets revealed in the seventh episode. He has a daughter and granddaughter in Paris. He is performed by Hans Clarin, who also voices Pumuckl.
- Corinna is Odessi's girlfriend. He met her in Hamburg. Her widowed grandma lives near the Tegernsee.
- Hanno is Corinna's older brother. When Odessi first sees him, he thinks he is Corinna's boyfriend.

== Episodes ==
- 1. "Pumuckls allerschönster Traum" / "Pumuckl's most beautiful dream"
- 2. "Pumuckls luftige Reise" / "Pumuckl's journey in the air"
- 3. "Pumuckls freche Hilfe" / "Pumuckl's cheeky help"
- 4. "Pumuckls böser Klabauter-Feind" / Pumuckl's evil klabauter enemy"
- 5. "Pumuckls stille Post" / "Pumuckl's Chinese Whispers"
- 6. "Pumuckls stürmische Seereise" / "Pumuckl's adventurous sea journey"
- 7. "Pumuckls gestohlener Fisch" / "Pumuckl's stolen fish"
- 8. "Pumuckls große Musikshow" / Pumuckl's big music show"
- 9. "Pumuckls listige Tricks" / "Pumuckl's sly pranks"
- 10. "Pumuckls nächtlicher Spuk" / "Pumuckl's night-time spook
- 11. "Pumuckls rotes Bild" / "Pumuckl's red picture"
- 12. "Pumuckls Abschiedsfoto" / Pumuckl's farewell picture"
- 13. "Pumuckls neues Heim" / "Pumuckl's new home"

== See also ==
- List of German television series
