= Meister Eder und sein Pumuckl (TV series) =

- Created by: Ulrich König
- Based on: Meister Eder und sein Pumuckl by Ellis Kaut
- Starring: Gustl Bayrhammer, Hans Clarin (voice), Erni Singerl, Toni Berger, Willy Harlander
- Countries of origin: West Germany, Hungary, Austria
- No. of seasons: 2
- No. of episodes: 52

Production
- Running time: 24 minutes

Original release
- Release: 24 September 1982 – 1989

Meister Eder und sein Pumuckl (Master Eder and his Pumuckl) is a West German-Austrian-Hungarian children's series. It is based on the character Pumuckl, created by children's book author Ellis Kaut.

== Plot ==
The master carpenter Eder meets the Kobold Pumuckl, whom only Eder can see, because Pumuckl becomes invisible when other people approach. Pumuckl finally stays with Eder in his carpenter's shop, and maintains a fatherly and friendly relationship with Eder.

== Background ==
1982/1983 the first season of the series was broadcast at Bayerischer Rundfunk (Bavarian Television), from September 24 and in Erstes Deutsches Fernsehen (First German Television), from September 26 consisting of 26 half-hour episodes. Between the production of the two seasons director of the first Pumuckl season and co-screenwriter Ulrich König created the Bogeyman Hatschipuh, a character which resembles Pumuckl (also in optical appearance) but has striking green instead of red hair, and whose name has also been taken from a Pumuckl screenplay. 1988/1989 followed a second season consisting of 26 all new episodes. Some differences between the first and the second season are notable e.g. Eder's carpenter's shop is now yellow on the outside and Pumuckl throws episode titles in the air. Since its original airing the series has been rerun various programs of the ARD.

The theme was co-created by famous South African-German musician Howard Carpendale. Many well-known German actors such as Willy Harlander, Ilse Neubauer, Erni Singerl, Toni Berger, Wolfgang Völz and Helga Feddersen had recurring appearances. The one-time guest appearances e.g. Lisa Fitz, Gisela Uhlen, Helmut Fischer, Barbara Valentin, Gaby Dohm, Klaus Schwarzkopf, Georg Thomalla, Wilfried Klaus, Barbara Rudnik, Iris Berben, Fredl Fesl, Karl Dall and Rolf Zacher were quite notable for a children's series. The show was directed by Ulrich König. The character Pumuckl was animated by Hungarian Pannonia Film Studio. The animation was directed by Béla Ternovszky.

Shooting location was a fictional workshop in the building Widenmayerstraße 2 in Altstadt-Lehel in Munich. The building has since been demolished.

The cinematic movie Pumuckl und der blaue Klabauter (Pumuckl and the blue Klabauter) had already been produced when, in 1999, the series was revived using the new title Pumuckls Abenteuer (Pumuckl's Adventures). The revived series lasted for an additional 13 episodes.

== Episodes of the series ==
=== First season (1982/1983) ===
- 1. "Spuk in der Werkstatt" / "Spook in the workshop" (with Mona Freiberg, Maria Stadler)
- 2. "Das verkaufte Bett" / "The sold bed" (with Katharina de Bruyn)
- 3. "Das neue Badezimmer" / "The new bathroom"(with Anton Feichtner, Lisa Fitz, Franz Muxeneder and Maria Singer)
- 4. "Das Schlossgespenst" / "The ghost in the castle" (with Margot Mahler, Wolfgang Völz, Hugo Lindinger and Gisela Uhlen)
- 5. "Die abergläubische Putzfrau" / "The superstitious cleaning lady" (with Helmut Fischer)
- 6. "Pumuckl macht Ferien" / "Pumuckl goes on holiday" (with Franziska Stömmer)
- 7. "Der Geist des Wassers" / "The water ghost" (with Franziska Stömmer)
- 8. "Pumuckl und die Schule" / "Pumuckl goes to school" (with Gustl Weishappel)
- 9. "Pumuckl und der Pudding" / "Pumuckl and the pudding" (with Elisabeth Karg)
- 10. "Der rätselhafte Hund" / "The mysterious dog" (with Hugo Lindinger, Rosl Mayr and Gila von Weitershausen)
- 11. "Pumuckl und der Nikolaus" / "Pumuckl and St. Nikolaus" (with Maria Stadler)
- 12. "Pumuckl auf heißer Spur" / "Pumuckl on a hot trail" (with Rosl Mayr, Rolf Zacher and Barbara Valentin)
- 13. "Das Weihnachtsgeschenk" / "The Christmas present" (with Kathi Leitner)
- 14. "Der erste Schnee" / "The first snow" (with Heide Ackermann and Annemarie Wendl)
- 15. "Der Wollpullover" / "The woollen sweater" (with Kathrin Ackermann, Marianne Brandt, Helga Feddersen)
- 16. "Der große Krach" / "The big fight" (with Helga Fleischhacker and Frauke Sinjen)
- 17. "Der große Krach und seine Folgen" / "The big fight and its consequences" (with Mona Freiberg)
- 18. "Eder bekommt Besuch" / "Eder receives visitors" (with Elisabeth Karg)
- 19. "Das Spanferkelessen" / "The suckling pig feast" (with Ludwig Schmid-Wildy and Hugo Lindinger)
- 20. "Pumuckl und Puwackl" / "Pumuckl and Puwackl" (with Marianne Brandt)
- 21. "Pumuckl und die Angst" / "Pumuckl and the fear" (with Anja Krettner)
- 22. "Der verhängnisvolle Schlagrahm" / "The fateful whipped cream" (with Ursula Reit)
- 23. "Pumuckl im Zoo" / "Pumuckl in the zoo" (with Gaby Dohm and Wolfgang Völz)
- 24. "Die geheimnisvollen Briefe" / "The mysterious letters" (with Trude Breitschopf)
- 25. "Pumuckl und die Ostereier" / "Pumuckl and the Easter eggs" (with Rolf Castell and Elisabeth Karg)
- 26. "Der erste April" / "April Fool's Day" (with Ludwig Schmid-Wildy, Volker Prechtel and Rosl Mayr)

=== Second season (1988/1989) ===
- 27. "Das Spielzeugauto" / "The toy car" (with Helga Feddersen, Ulrich Elhardt and Matthias Elhardt)
- 28. "Pumuckl und die Obstbäume" / "Pumuckl and the fruit trees" (with Fritz Straßner and Hans Stadtmüller)
- 29. "Pumuckl und die Maus" / "Pumuckl and the mouse" (with Max Nüchtern)
- 30. "Das Segelboot" / "The sailing boat" (with Kurt Weinzierl, Oliver Stritzel and Ossi Eckmüller)
- 31. "Die Bergtour" / "The hiking tour" (with Walter Feuchtenberg)
- 32. "Die Blechbüchsen" / "The tin cans" (with Michaela May)
- 33. "Die Schatzsucher" / "The treasure hunters" (with Hans Stadtmüller)
- 34. "Das Gespenst im Gartenhaus" / "The phantom in the garden shed" (with Ursula Luber)
- 35. "Die geheimnisvolle Schaukel" / "The mysterious swings" (with Maria Singer)
- 36. "Pumuckl und die Katze" / "Pumuckl and the cat" (with Eva Astor)
- 37. "Pumuckl und der Schnupfen" / "Pumuckl and the runny nose" (with Klaus Schwarzkopf)
- 38. "Eders Weihnachtsgeschenk" / "Eder's Christmas present" (with Georg Thomalla and Hans Stadlbauer)
- 39. "Pumuckl ist an gar nichts schuld" / "Nothing is Pumuckl's fault" (with Hans Brenner and Elisabeth Karg)
- 40. "Ein schwieriger Kunde" / "A difficult customer" (with Enzi Fuchs, Wilfried Klaus and Veronika von Quast)
- 41. "Der blutige Daumen" / "The bloody thumb" (with Max Nüchtern)
- 42. "Pumuckl und die Kopfwehtabletten" / "Pumuckl and the painkillers" (with Monika Baumgartner)
- 43. "Ein Knüller für die Zeitung" / "Sensational news for the paper" (with Christine Neubauer, Henry van Lyck and Barbara Rudnik)
- 44. "Pumuckl geht ans Telefon" / "Pumuckl answers the phone" (with Harald Dietl and Towje Kleiner)
- 45. "Pumuckl will Schreiner werden" / "Pumuckl wants to become a carpenter" (with Iris Berben and Horst Sachtleben)
- 46. "Der silberne Kegel" / "The silver pin" (with Egon Biscan, Christine Neubauer and Hans Stadtmüller)
- 47. "Das Spiel mit dem Feuer" / "Playing with fire" (with Michaela May and Josef Schwarz)
- 48. "Pumuckl will eine Uhr haben" / "Pumuckl wants to have a watch" (with Harald Dietl, Veronika Faber and Elisabeth Volkmann)
- 49. "Die Plastikente" / "The plastic duck" (with Karl Dall and Helga Feddersen)
- 50. "Pumuckl auf Hexenjagd" / "Pumuckl on a witch hunt" (with Monika Baumgartner)
- 51. "Hilfe eine Aushilfe!" / "Help, a temp!" (with Beatrice Richter)
- 52. "Pumuckl und die Musik" / "Pumuckl and the music" (with Fredl Fesl, Christine Neubauer, Fritz Straßner and Hans Stadtmüller)

=== Pumuckl's Adventures (1999) ===
- 1. "Pumuckls allerschönster Traum" / "Pumuckl's most beautiful dream"
- 2. "Pumuckls luftige Reise" / "Pumuckl's journey in the air"
- 3. "Pumuckls freche Hilfe" / "Pumuckl's cheeky help"
- 4. "Pumuckls böser Klabauter-Feind" / "Pumuckl's evil klabauter enemy"
- 5. "Pumuckls stille Post" / "Pumuckl's silent mail"
- 6. "Pumuckls stürmische Seereise" / "Pumuckl's adventurous sea journey"
- 7. "Pumuckls gestohlener Fisch" / "Pumuckl's stolen fish"
- 8. "Pumuckls große Musikshow" / "Pumuckl's big music show"
- 9. "Pumuckls listige Tricks" / "Pumuckl's sly pranks"
- 10. "Pumuckls nächtlicher Spuk" / "Pumuckl's night-time spook"
- 11. "Pumuckls rotes Bild" / "Pumuckl's red picture"
- 12. "Pumuckls Abschiedsfoto" / Pumuckl's farewell picture"
- 13. "Pumuckls neues Heim" / "Pumuckl's new home"

== Locations ==
The shooting for the television series was held in various locations, mainly in Munich.

Meister Eder's workshop was located in a rear building of Widenmayerstraße 2 in Lehel, which was specially refurbished for the filming and then demolished in 1985 after the end of the live-action filming.

The street shots outside the house were against Tattenbachstraße 16, because the traffic was too busy for filming in Widenmayerstraße.

The exterior shots of Master Eder's favourite inn were shot in front of the restaurant "Zum Huterer" in Grütznerstraße, Haidhausen, while the interior shots were filmed in "Gasthaus Kandler" in Oberbiberg, Oberhaching.

The toy store that appears in some episodes was located on Johannisplatz in Haidhausen; today the building houses another store.

The school building in the first season was filmed on Mühlbaurstraße in Bogenhausen.

== See also ==
- List of German television series
