= Kolodko =

Kolodko (Ukrainian: Колодко) or Kołodko is a gender-neutral Slavic surname. Notable people with the surname include:

- Grzegorz Kołodko (born 1949), Polish economist
- Mykhailo Kolodko (born 1978), Ukrainian-Hungarian sculptor
- Yevgeniya Kolodko (born 1990), Russian shot putter
