= Von Johnson =

Von Johnson may refer to:

- Vaughan Johnson (1962–2019), American football player
- Vaughan Johnson (politician) (1947–2023), Australian politician
- Vaughn Johnson (born 1960), New Zealand cricketer
- Ace Von Johnson, guitarist
- Barbara von Johnson (born 1942), German illustrator and artist
