= Luitpoldpark =

Public park in Munich, Germany

Luitpold Park
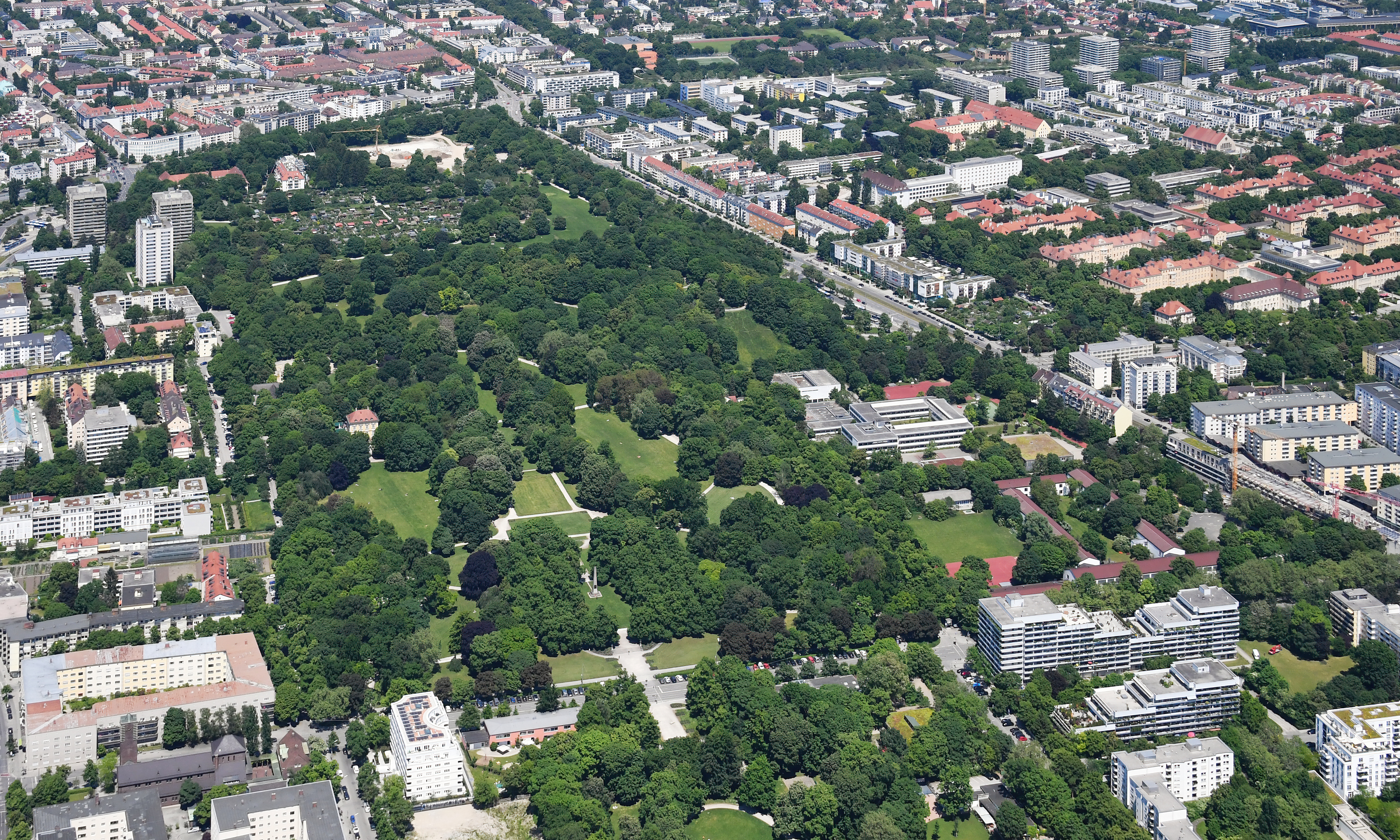
- Aerial view of the Luitpoldpark
- Interactive map of Luitpold Park
- Type: Urban park
- Location: Munich, Bavaria, Germany
- Coordinates: 48°10′17″N 11°34′12″E
- Area: 33 hectares (82 acres)
- Created: 1911
- Operator: Bayerische Verwaltung der staatlichen Schlösser, Gärten und Seen
- Status: Open year round

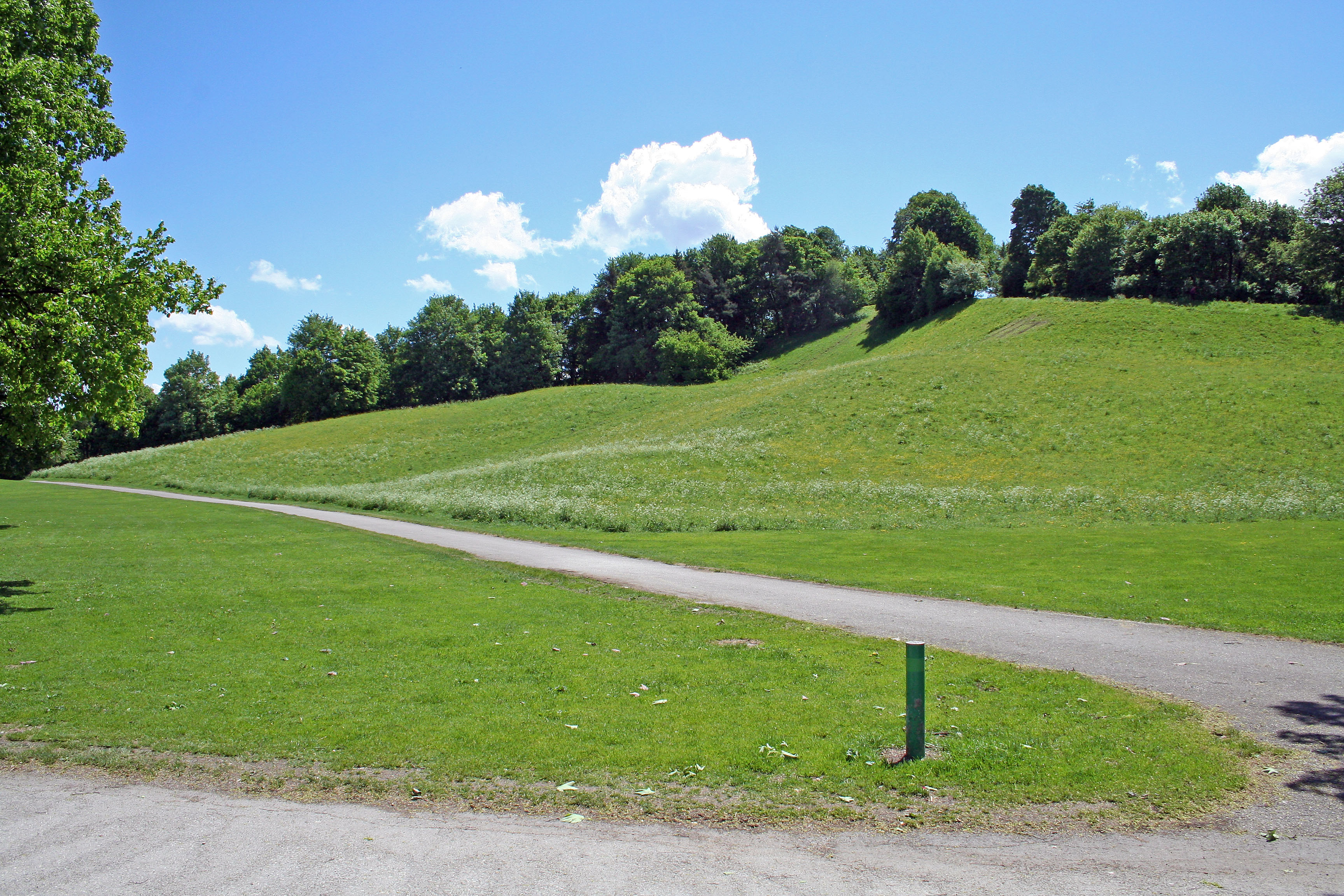
The Luitpoldhügel

Luitpoldpark is a public park in the Schwabing-West borough of Munich, Germany.

== History ==
The park was built as Munich was expanding north from Maxvorstadt in the early 20th century, in order to preserve green space in the growing city. It was named in honor of the Bavarian Prince Regent Luitpold in 1911 to commemorate the prince's 90th birthday. It is 33 hectares (82 acres) in size. The park is accessible from the Scheidplatz underground station. On a clear day, it is possible to see the Alps from the park.

== Features ==
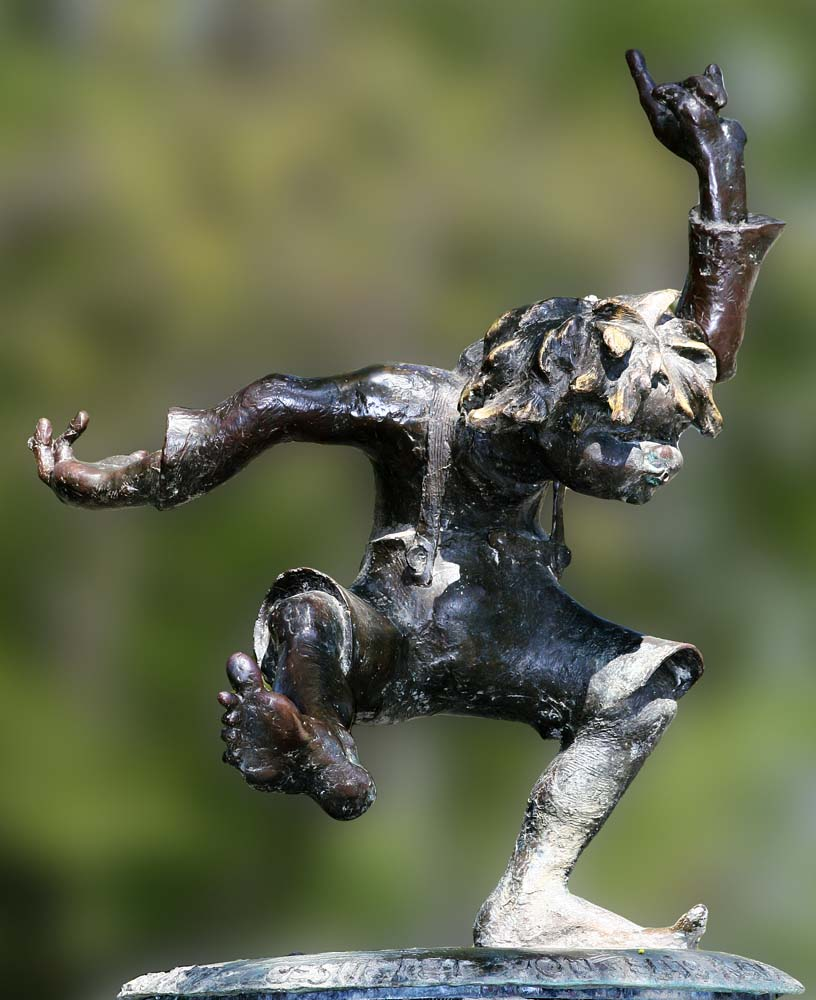
Pumuckl fountain

A distinctive feature of the park is the Luitpoldhügel, a 37-metre-tall (121 ft) hill consisting of rubble piled up from World War II British-American bombing attacks on the city. In 1949, following the war, a plain cross was erected on top of the hill, with an inscription reading, "Betet und gedenkt all der unter den Bergen von Trümmern Verstorbenen!" (German for "Pray for and remember all of those who died under the mountains of rubble"). In 1952, this became a permanent memorial.

The Bamberger Haus (Bamberg House) sits at the western end of the park. It opened in 1911 as a cafe and was named after its design, which was modelled on a house in Bamberg. The site was bombed during World War II and rebuilt in the 1980s. There is a hedge maze adjacent to the house.

The Pumuckl fountain in the park is named after the eponymous character created by Ellis Kaut. The figure intermittently spits out water, which may unexpectedly soak park guests.

The park is also known for its old trees, and is lined with ginkgo and pyramidal oak trees, among others. At the park's opening, the central feature was a 17-metre-tall (56 ft) obelisk constructed from limestone from the nearby district of Lower Franconia, surrounded by 90 lime trees, one for each year of Luitpold's life, and 25 oak trees.

== Events ==
The park remains popular and has hosted numerous festivals and events. In the winter, the steep hills in the park are popular for sledding.
