= Uli der Fehlerteufel =

Fictional character created by Ilse Herrndobler

Uli der Fehlerteufel (English: "Uli the mistake devil") is a fictional character used in schoolbook exercises. The name in abbreviated form is "Uli", full name "Ulimantulus Irrichmich". The last name is pronounced, "Irr ich mich", which means something like, "Am I wrong?" (However, "Uli" is a common German name, short for Ulrich).

Uli was a rotund little red devil with blue-black hair depicted in German primary school books in the 1970s and the 1980s. Exercises were based on him, where for example Uli had removed the capital letters or punctuation marks from a text and it was up to the student to replace them.

Uli was created by Ilse Herrndobler who developed the character during her work as a teacher in the 1960s. Subsequently about 40 primary school books were published. Due to the enormous success of the "Uli" school books, the children's book author Ellis Kaut (who created the very popular children's book character "Pumuckl") was asked to write stories based on "Uli" which was followed by the "Fehlerteufelgeschichten" (English: "mistake devil stories") in 1974 with illustrations contributed by Franz Josef Ott.

Aside from what he helped students learn, Uli himself remains a fond memory. Comparable English concepts are Typo Fairy or Typo Demon, but while they are generic and open to interpretation, there is only one Uli. He also bears resemblance to Titivillus, a demon who serves Satan by introducing errors into type or writing.
