= Titivillus =

Demon who introduces errors into texts

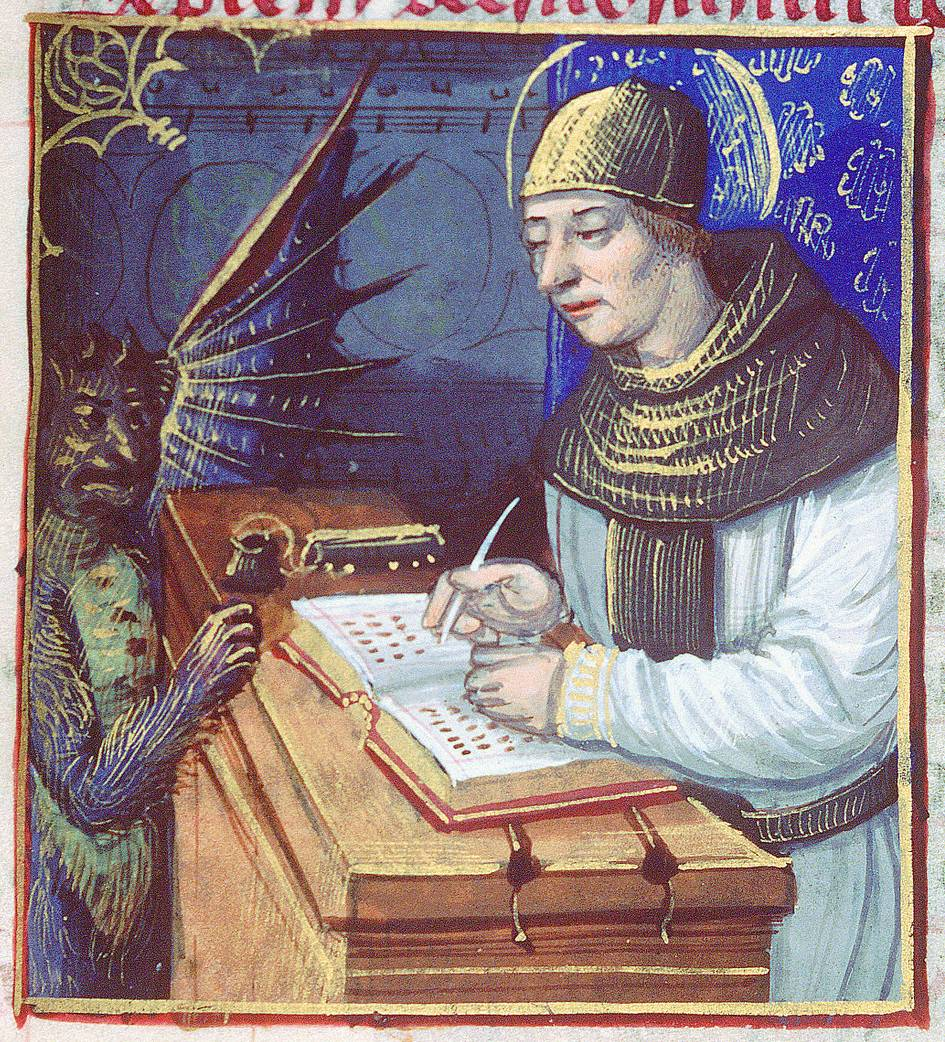
14th century illustration of Titivillus at a scribe's desk

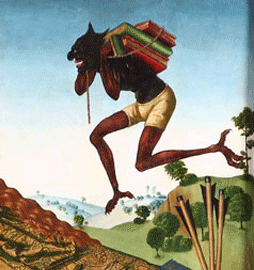
Titivillus in a detail of Diego de la Cruz's Virgin of Mercy (c. 1485), Burgos, Abbey of Santa María la Real de Las Huelgas.

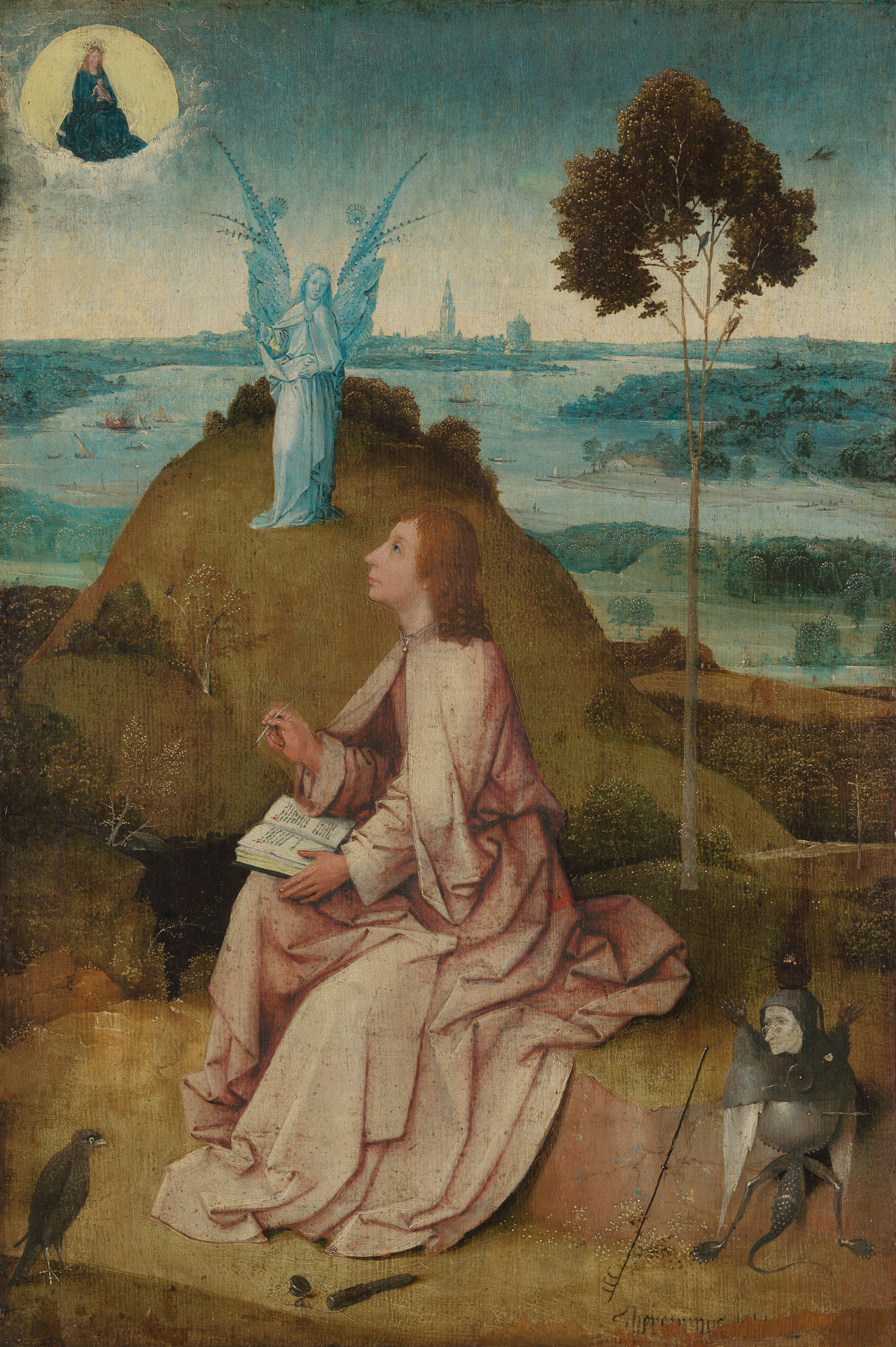
Saint John the Evangelist on Patmos by Hieronymus Bosch, 1505. It is believed that the devil on the lower right corner of the scene, with a human face and an insect body, is Titivillus. It appears Titivillus tries to grab and steal Saint John's ink bottle using a rake-like tool.

In Christianity, Titivillus is a demon said to collect errors in the work of scribes. Titivillus has also been described as collecting idle chat that occurs during church service, as well as any mispronounced, mumbled or skipped words of the service, to take to Hell to be counted against the offenders. The first reference to Titivillus by name occurred in Tractatus de Penitentia, c. 1285, by Johannes Galensis (John of Wales). (Note: Little is known of Johannes Galensis aside from this text and a set of Decretales intermediæ.) Attribution has also been given to Caesarius of Heisterbach.

He has been called the "patron demon of scribes," as Titivillus provides an easy excuse for the errors that are bound to creep into manuscripts as they are copied. (Note: For a twentieth-century subversive demon of mechanical failures, compare gremlin.) He has also been called the "patron demon of printers" for this same reason. This description of Titivillus introducing errors into documents, as opposed to merely collecting errors, has been traced back to the writer Anatole France.

Titivillus gained a broader role as a subversive figure of physical comedy, with satirical commentary on human vanities, in late medieval English pageants, such as the Iudicium that finishes the Towneley Cycle. He plays an antagonistic role in the medieval English play Mankind.

In an anonymous 15th-century English devotional treatise, Myroure of Oure Ladye, Titivillus introduced himself thus (I.xx.54): "I am a poure dyuel, and my name ys Tytyvyllus ... I muste eche day ... brynge my master a thousande pokes full of faylynges, and of neglygences in syllables and wordes."

Marc Drogin noted in his instructional manual, Medieval Calligraphy: Its History and Technique (1980), that "for the past half-century every edition of The Oxford English Dictionary has listed an incorrect page reference for, of all things, a footnote on the earliest mention of Titivillus."

== Origins ==
The function of collecting liturgical errors in a sack was first mentioned in the 1220s by Jacques de Vitry in Sermones vulgares (tenth sermon, on Numbers 18:5), which speaks of a demon that listens to the choir singing psalms and collects syncopated or omitted syllables in a sack.

I have heard that a certain holy man, while in the choir, saw a devil truly weighed down with a full sack. When, however, he commanded the demon to tell what he carried, the evil one said: "These are the syllables and syncopated words and verses of the psalms which these very clerics in their morning prayers stole from God; you can be sure I am keeping these diligently for their accusation."

This demon was later given the name "Titivillus" by Johannes Galensis c. 1285. "Titivillus collects fragments of words and puts them in his bag thousand times every day." (Fragmina verborum Titivillus colligit horum quibus die mille vicibus se sarcinat ille).

Regarding the demon's function, André Vernet points out that the Latin terms, particularly "collect" (colligere) and "fragments" (fragmenta) for the clergy's omissions, derive from John 6:12, the feeding the multitude narrative, in which the disciples are told to "Gather up the broken pieces (Colligite fragmenta)." As to the demon's name, Titivillus, Vernet points to The City of God (Book IV, Chapter 8), in a passage in which Augustine, while giving examples of the numerous Roman deities assigned to each step of the agricultural process, mentions a goddess Tutilina whose job is to watch over grain after it was collected and stored. "Titivillus" and its many variants (Tutivillus, Tytivillum, Tintillus, Tantillus, Tintinillus, Titivitilarius, Titivilitarius) could have resulted from a series of copyists' errors, such as those in the copy of City of God available to Johannes Galensis.

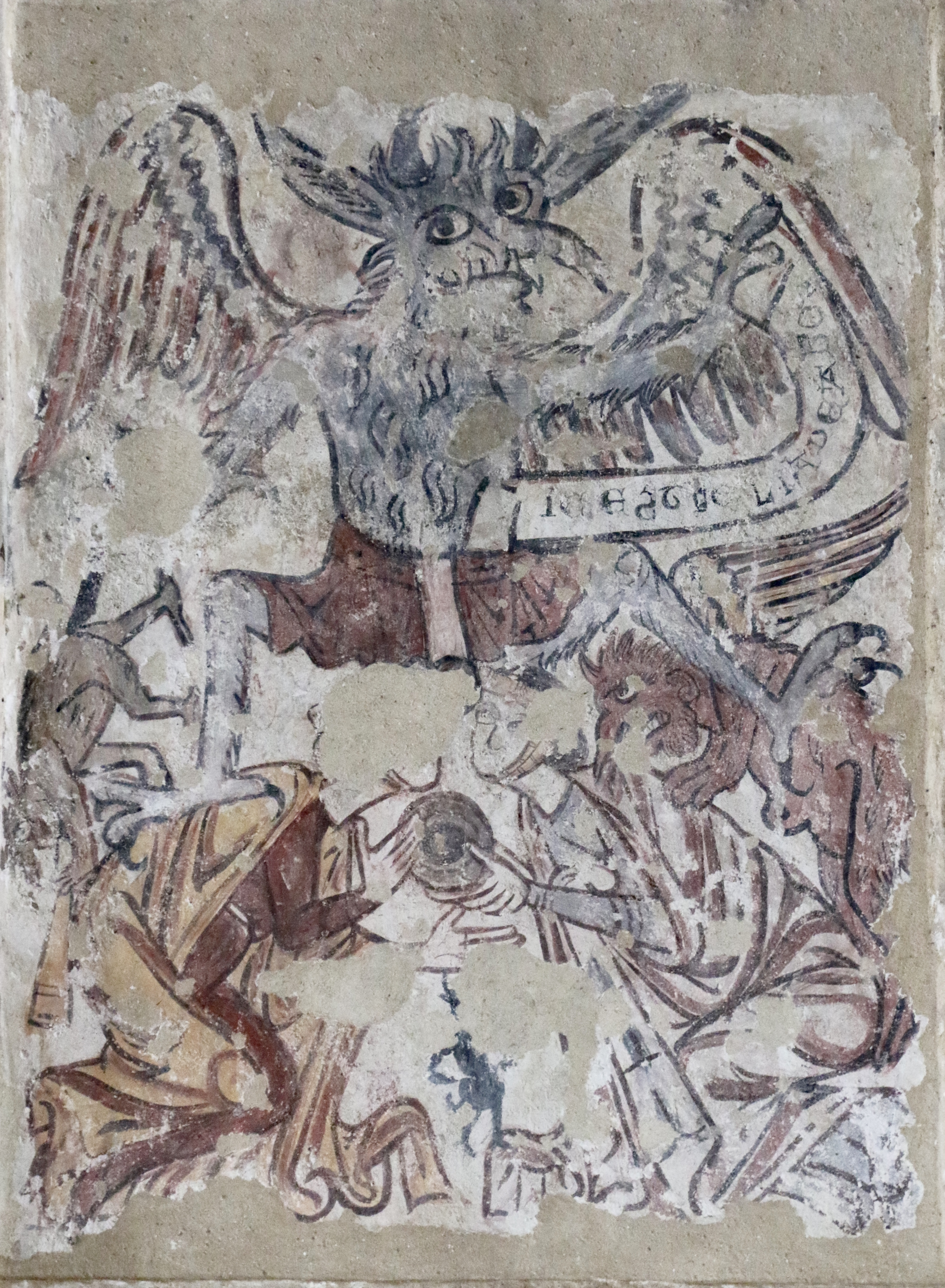
Representation of Titivillus on a wall painting in St. Michael with St. Mary's Church, Melbourne.

== In popular culture ==
Since 1983, one of the many demons populating the role-playing game Dungeons & Dragons is named "Titivilus."

He was the subject of the book Tittivulus: or The Verbiage Collector by Michael Ayrton.

In The Liar's Dictionary by Eley Williams, Titivillus is the name given to the cat of a fictional dictionary-producing company which discovers it has an issue with fake words.

== See also ==
- Printer's devil
- Wicked Bible
- Uli der Fehlerteufel
- Daemones Ceramici – Ancient Greek hexameter poem
