= Meister Eder und sein Pumuckl =

German children's series, started in 1961

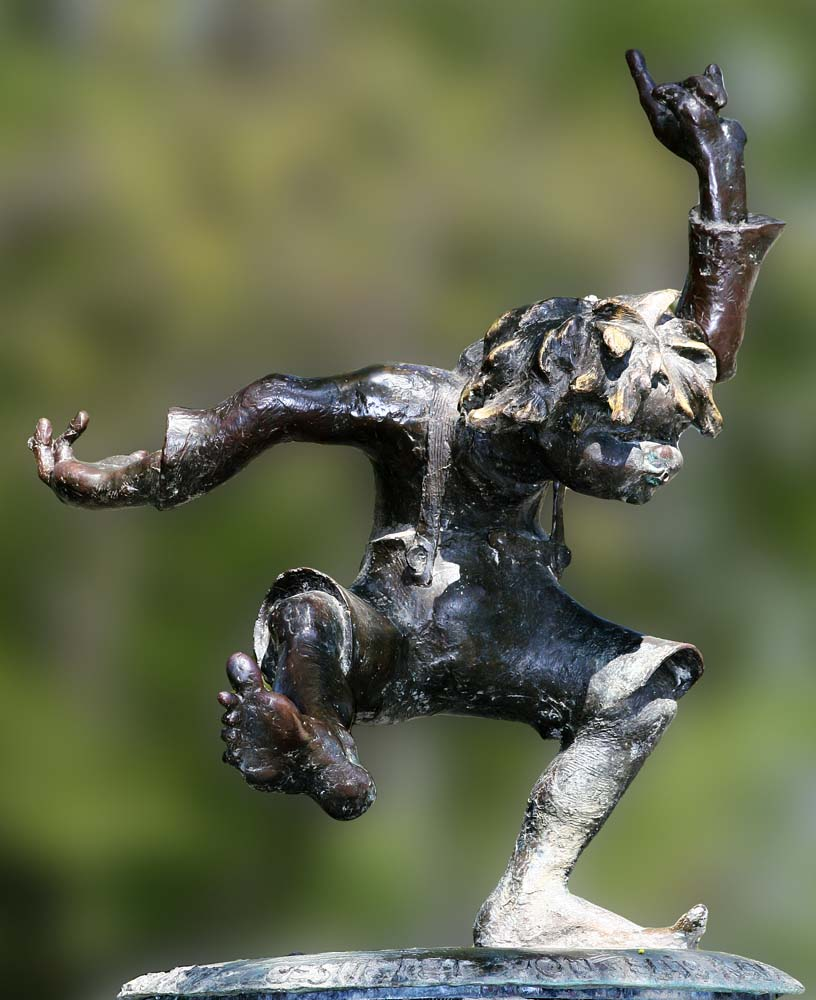
Pumuckl statue in Luitpoldpark in Munich

Meister Eder und sein Pumuckl (English: Master Eder and his Pumuckl) is a German children's series created by Ellis Kaut. Originally a radio play series of the Bavarian Radio in 1961, the stories were later adapted into books, a successful TV series of the same name, three films and a musical.

Pumuckl is a red-haired Kobold descendant of the Klabautermänner. He is invisible to people around him except for the master carpenter Eder with whom Pumuckl lives. Pumuckl is one of the most popular characters in children's entertainment in Germany. Several generations have now grown up with the cheeky and funny little Kobold.

== Plot ==
=== How Pumuckl and Master Eder met ===
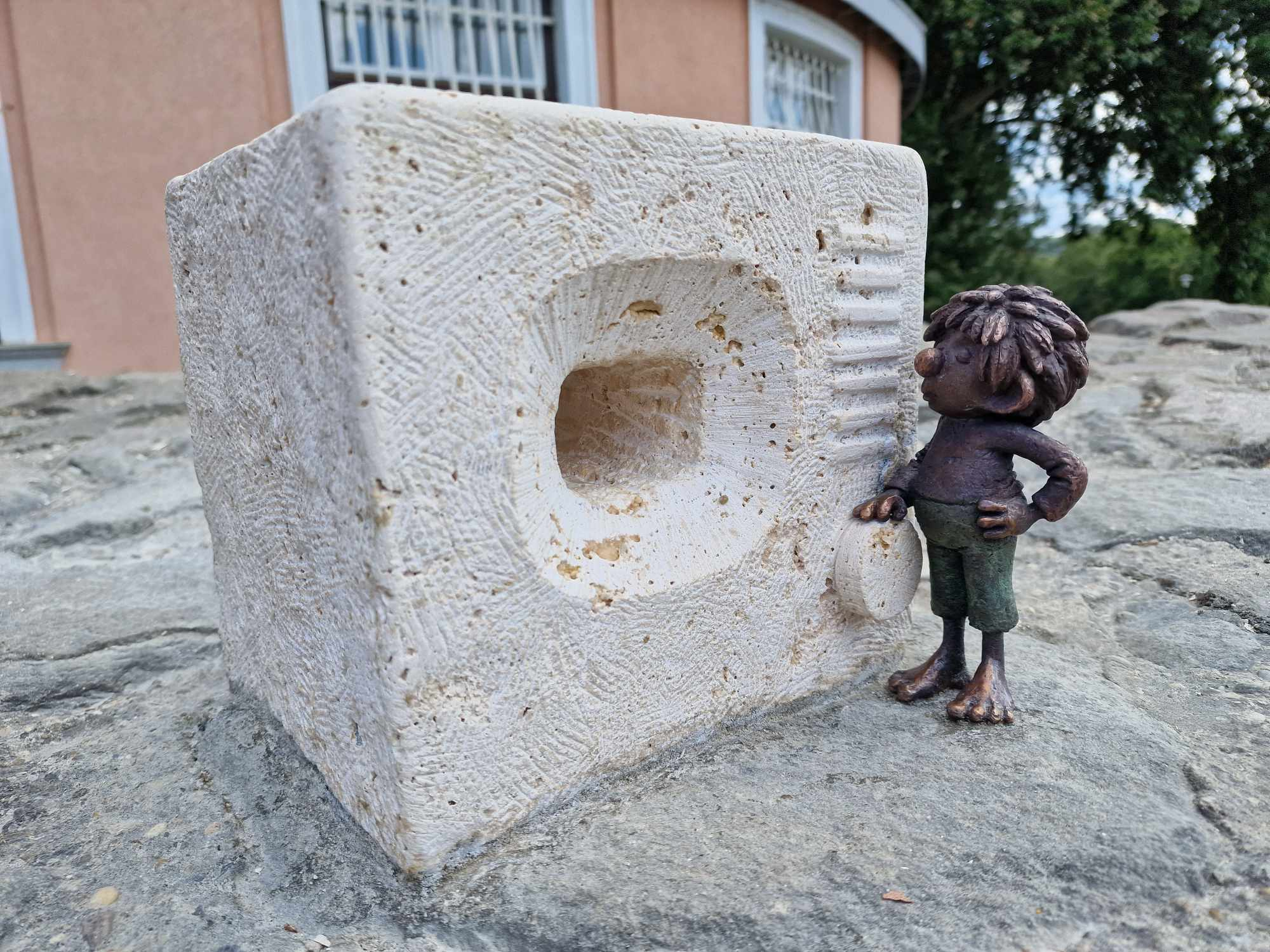
Pumuckl statue in the Watertown District of Esztergom, Hungary by Mykhailo Kolodko

Being a descendant of the Klabautermann people, who were sailors, Pumuckl loves everything that has to do with the ocean, especially sailboats. For reasons unknown, he gets lost in Bavaria, where no ships are to be found. He doesn't like neat and clean places, so he takes refuge in a carpenter's untidy workshop. The workshop belongs to elderly Meister Eder. It is precisely the fact that the workshop is untidy which seals Pumuckl's fate. He gets stuck on an overflowing pot of glue. It is a rule among Kobolds that whenever one of his kind gets stuck to something manmade, they become visible, and according to the rules of their ancestors, must stay with the human who sees them, in this case Meister Eder. On the show and in the books, Pumuckl is always visible if nobody other than Meister Eder is present. However, he turns invisible when other people come into view. At first, Meister Eder is reluctant to take in the kobold, since he is quite content on his own, but Pumuckl makes it clear that he has no other choice. A deep friendship soon blossoms between the elderly man and the cheeky kobold.

Note: Meister Eder's profession is given as "Schreinermeister" in the original German, which means that he makes and repairs furniture, which is also shown on the show (and mentioned in the stories and radio plays). The term "Meister" means that Eder has the qualification to take in apprentices. In Germany at the time, it was common to refer to craftsmen by their professional title and their last name, the way it is still done with doctors.

=== A typical Pumuckl story ===
There are several ways for a Pumuckl story to begin. These include:

- Pumuckl feels bored in the workshop, so Meister Eder tells him to go out to explore, but not get into trouble. Naturally, Pumuckl does get into trouble.
- Pumuckl is bored and sneaks out of the workshop without Meister Eder's approval. He meets the people in the neighborhood, eavesdrops on them and occasionally plays a practical joke on them or else tries to help them (with varying levels of success).
- A client enters the workshop who has something Pumuckl fancies.
- A client enters the workshop and discovers a belonging of Pumuckl's (typically one of the tiny pieces of furniture that Meister Eder has made for him); he/she wants to purchase it at all cost.
- A conflict between Meister Eder and his sister or his cleaning woman is shown. Pumuckl tries to help.
- Meister Eder and Pumuckl go on holiday or on a day trip.
- Meister Eder is ridiculed by somebody (usually because he believes in Pumuckl), and Pumuckl tries to make things better.
- Meister Eder presents Pumuckl with a gift
  Note: Usually, this ends with the gift being withdrawn.
- Pumuckl discovers something in Meister Eder's household (e.g. matches) and plays with it.

At the end of each episode of the 1980s TV show, Pumuckl and Meister Eder usually reconcile. However, some episodes end with Pumuckl being punished. At the end of one episode, in which Pumuckl tries to make chocolate pudding without Meister Eder's permission, Eder confines Pumuckl to the balcony and eats the pudding alone. Other episodes end with Eder's withdrawal of something he gave to the little kobold. The two-part story "Der große Krach" ("The big dispute") has the first part ending with Eder throwing Pumuckl and his bed out of the workshop. But by the end of the second part, the two have reconciled.

== Main characters ==
=== Pumuckl ===
Pumuckl sitting on Meister Eder's (Gustl Bayrhammer) shoulder

Pumuckl's character is usually childishly immature and mischievous. Since the Pumuckl stories are aimed at children, we presume that he was written this way so that children can relate to him. Pumuckl's age is never mentioned, in one radio play he claims he was born "vor siebzig-dreizehn Jahren" ("seventy-thirteen year ago"), since he cannot count very far and constantly invents certain fantasy numbers. In a TV episode he claims he was "dreihundertzwölfundzwanzig Jahre alt" ("three hundred twelve and twenty years old"). He had a life before he became visible, but it was very different: he didn't have to eat and was immune to cold and heat.

Meister Eder sees Pumuckl as a child and usually appears as his guardian. He often tries to teach him some morals, not always with the desired result. For example, he never really manages to suppress Pumuckl's urge to steal things, though he always makes him give back what the little kobold has taken.

Pumuckl is occasionally very selfish, and sometimes this leads to actual wrongdoing. However, when Pumuckl realises that he has hurt somebody, he feels genuine remorse and does everything he can to help that person.

In the TV show Pumuckl is usually dressed in a yellow shirt and green trousers. He wears those clothes right from the first time Meister Eder sees him, and they, unlike any other clothing, are invisible too. Only one episode, "Der Wollpullover" ("The woollen sweater"), deals with Pumuckl's occasional need for other clothes (the sweater however is not invisible. The kobold always is barefoot.

In the audio plays and TV show, Pumuckl was voiced by actor Hans Clarin.

=== Meister Eder ===
He appears to be the exact opposite of Pumuckl. The little kobold likes to get in trouble, but the elderly carpenter prefers to stay out of trouble and keeps to himself. He spends most of his time with Pumuckl. However, he has a couple of friends, elderly handymen like himself, whom he regularly meets in the local pub to have a beer. Meister Eder, whose first name is given as "Franz", has a sister and two young nieces, Barbara, nicknamed Bärbel (as seen in the episode "Eder bekommt Besuch"/"Eder gets visitors") and Monika (as seen in the episode "Pumuckl und die Ostereier"/"Pumuckl and the Easter eggs"). Furthermore, he has a nephew named Dieter (as seen in the episode "Die Bergtour"/"The hiking tour"). Meister Eder's sister is concerned because her brother has never found a wife and spends a lot of time alone, which occasionally leads to conflicts between the siblings. Other family members are his cousin Irma and her son Fritzl (as seen in the episode "Der verhängnisvolle Schlagrahm"/"The fateful whipped cream"). Although his workshop is often in disorder, Meister Eder likes a clean living space (he lives in a flat above his workshop), which is why he has a cleaning lady, who serves as a supporting character in several stories. Being very different from Pumuckl, Meister Eder is presented as a law-abiding citizen who is meticulous on the job and always polite. He also completely fails to have sympathy with Pumuckl when the latter steals things. When the little kobold plays a minor practical joke, his behavior is sometimes condoned by Eder, because it made him laugh or think.

In the TV show, Bavarian actor Gustl Bayrhammer played Master Eder. On the radio show, before Bayrhammer, Eder was originally voiced by Franz Fröhlich and Alfred Pongratz. Additionally, Wolf Euba dubbed the voice of Eder in parts of the Blaue Klabauter film (1994).

=== Supporting characters ===
- Mrs. Eichinger - She is Meister Eder's cleaning lady. She is incredibly superstitious and constantly tries to persuade Meister Eder to believe in the same things she does, for instance by reading him his horoscope. Meister Eder usually reacts in a dismissive way, but that doesn't keep the cleaning lady from trying again.
- Mr. Bernbacher - a locksmith and best friend of Meister Eder. Bernbacher is the one who always teases Meister Eder about Pumuckl. In several episodes, that results in an indignant Pumuckl pulling pranks on Bernbacher.
- Mr. Schmitt - runs a small car repair shop. He is another friend of Meister Eder's.
- Mr. Wimmer - a person who never appears on the show in person, though he can be heard occasionally during phone conversations. Wimmer operates an antique store which Meister Eder sometimes repairs pieces of furniture for.
- Mr. Schwertfeger - an elderly acquaintance of Mr. Eder. Appears in the film and in a few episodes. His trademark is wearing two glasses at once, one on the nose and one on the forehead.
- Mr. and Mrs. Stürzlinger - the caretakers of the house in which Mr. Eder lives and works.
- Mrs. Hartl - Eder's nosy and capricious neighbor.

== History ==
=== 1961: Radio plays ===
Pumuckl's character was invented in 1961 by the German novelist Ellis Kaut after she wrote a short story about a naughty demon for a radio drama series at the Bavarian Radio. The first episode of the show was broadcast on February 21, 1962 and the last episode was broadcast on December 30, 1973. A total of 90 episodes were created. Pumuckl's naughty character was an immediate success among the young audience.

=== 1965: Books ===
In 1963 a competition was held at Munich's graphic art academy which focused on the creation of Pumuckl's appearance. The winner was Barbara von Johnson.

In 1965 Pumuckl's first book was published. The book consisted of illustrations made by Johnson. Between 1965 and 1978, ten books which consisted of 60 stories were published by the publisher Stuttgart-Herald. Only in 1991 an eleventh book was published which consisted of six more stories. Thus a total of 66 stories have been published in book form until today.

=== 1969: records ===
33 LPs were created since 1969 which were based on the radio show, however, there was much less dialect than on the radio shows. On the records Pumuckl was played by Hans Clarin and Master Eder was played by Alfred Pongratz. After the death of Alfred Pongratz six more LPs were produced, each with two episodes, in which Gustl Bayrhammer played Master Eder and Harald Leipnitz was the narrator. After the success of the movie and the first TV season, a complete new edition was created which consisted of 86 episodes in cassette format in which Gustl Bayrhammer played Meister Eder.

=== 1982: Feature film "Meister Eder and his Pumuckl" ===
Between 1979 and 1982 the first Pumuckl feature film was released under the title "Meister Eder and his Pumuckl". Pumuckl appears in the film and in all the subsequently films and TV series, as a cartoon character in a real environment.

=== 1982-1988: TV series "Meister Eder and his Pumuckl" ===
The first season of the series was broadcast on Bavarian television as a German-Hungarian co-production during 1982-1983 and consisted of 26 half-hour episodes. Many well-known German actors like Willy Harlander, Erni Singerl, Toni Berger, Wolfgang Völz and Helga Feddersen had appearances in the series. In addition, it featured many one-time guest appearances of famous German actors like Lisa Fitz, Gisela Uhlen, Helmut Fischer, Barbara Valentin, Gaby Dohm, Klaus Schwarzkopf, Georg Thomalla, Barbara Rudnik, Iris Berben, Fredl Fesl, Karla Bonoff and Rolf Zacher. The series was directed by Ulrich König.

The second season of the series which was broadcast during 1988-1989 consisted of another 26 episodes.

=== 1994: Feature film "Pumuckl and the blue Klabauter" ===
Gustl Bayrhammer died in 1993. Because of his death before the completion of the film, Bayrhammers voice was dubbed in the remaining segments of the film by the actor Wolf Euba.

=== 1995-2007: TV show "Pumuckl TV" ===
In 1995 ARD started to broadcast "Pumuckl TV". Hans Clarin played the villain in this series.

=== 1999: TV series "Pumuckls Abenteuer" ===
In 1999 another 13 episodes were broadcast on the Children's Channel, under the title "Pumuckl's Abenteuer". Due to Bayrhammer's death, the plot occurred aboard a ship and focused on Pumuckl and the ship's cook.

This third season did not reach the popularity of the first two seasons of the show broadcast in the 1980s.

=== 2000: Musical "Meister Eder and his Pumuckl" ===
On October 21, 2000 a Pumuckl musical called "Meister Eder and his Pumuckl" started to play in Munich. The musical has had over 250,000 spectators.

=== 2003: Feature film "Pumuckl and his circus adventures" ===
The film "Pumuckl and his Circus Adventure" was produced between 1999 and 2003. In the movie, Eder died off-screen, resulting in Pumuckl deciding to move to Eder's cousin, who is played by Hans Clarin, who, due to his bad health, was no longer able to voice Pumuckl, which is why the character was voiced by Kai Taschner instead.

=== 2023: Neue Geschichten vom Pumuckl ===
In the summer of 2022, a new German family television series based on the Meister Eder und sein Pumuckl series created by Ellis Kaut called Neue Geschichten vom Pumuckl (in English: New Stories from Pumuckl) was filmed and released on RTL+ on December 11, 2023. The premiere was at the end of June 2023 as part of the Munich Film Festival, where the production was awarded the Audience Award of the Kinderfilmfest. From October 26, 2023, the first three episodes were shown in selected cinemas for a short time. On December 25 and 26, 2023, both RTL and ORF 1 showed all episodes on linear television.

=== 2025: Feature film "Pumuckl und das große Missverständnis" ===
"Pumuckl und das große Missverständnis" (in English: Pumuckl and the Big Misunderstanding) is a feature film by Marcus H. Rosenmüller. The film was released in German cinemas on October 30, 2025. Pumuckl lives with Florian Eder, who continues to run his late uncle Meister Eder's small backyard carpentry workshop in Munich.

== Pumuckl Controversy ==
According to Reuters News, April 11, 2007, Ellis Kaut is going to court in a dispute over the impending marriage of Pumuckl. The illustrator, Barbara von Johnson, is supporting a local TV show's contest to design a girlfriend for Pumuckl. The winner will get to visit von Johnson's Munich villa and take part in a "wedding" staged for the popular fictional character.

According to the same Reuters article, von Johnson said Pumuckl deserves a girlfriend but Kaut said the character must stay true to his spirit nature.

According to Spiegel Online, January 10, 2008 the verdict was: Pumuckl may marry - at least he could now if he wanted to.

== See also ==
- Uli der Fehlerteufel
