= Klabautermann =

Water kobold that assists fishermen and sailors

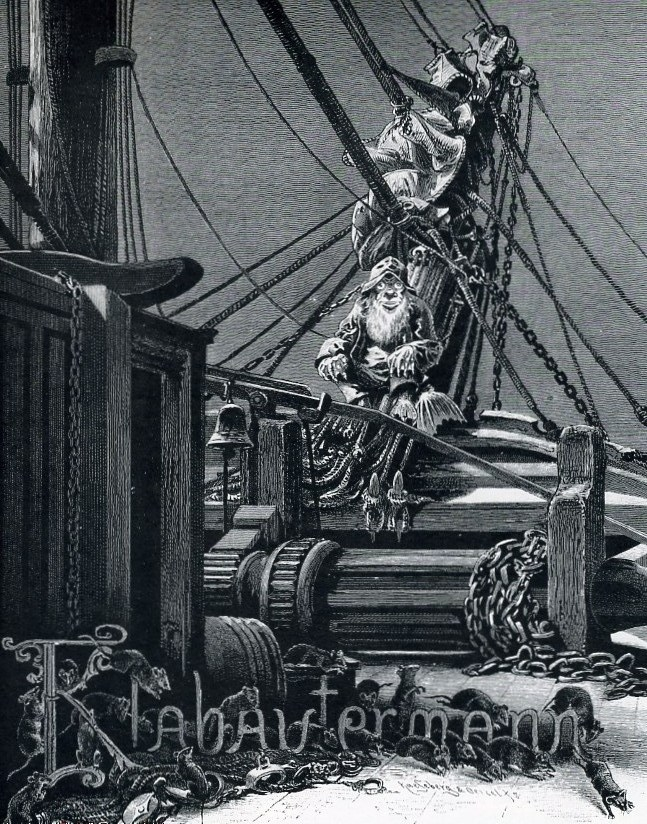
A Klabautermann on a ship ―Froｍ Anton von Werner (illustr.); Ludwig von Henk (1885) [1882] Zur See

A Klabautermann (German: [klaˈbaʊtɐˌman]) "hobgoblin"; or Kalfater ("caulker" (Note: Temme (1840), repr. in Klee (1885), Altmann tr. (2006).)) is a water kobold in Frisian, German and Dutch folklore that assists sailors and fishermen on the North Sea in their duties.

Dutch/Belgian tales of kaboutermanneken described them as cave dwellers in mountains, who may help out humans who put out offerings of bread and butter, sometimes out in the open, but other times at their millhouse or farmstead. Belief in the Klabautermann dates to at least the 1770s, with written records beginning in the 1810s.

== Nomenclature ==
The Klabautermann (also spelt Klaboterman, Klabotermann, Kalfatermann), sometimes even referred to by the name "kobold", is a creature from the beliefs of fishermen and sailors of Germany's north coast, the Low Countries (Netherlands, etc.) in the North Sea and the Baltic countries as well.

The Estonian counterpart are called kotermann or potermann, borrowed from foreign speech.

=== Etymology ===
An etymology deriving the name from the verb kalfatern ("to caulk") has been suggested by the linguist Friedrich Kluge, who considered "Klabautermann" merely to be a variant on "Kalfater" or "caulker" (attested by Temme). (Note: Kluge (1911), Anmerkung 1.) This was accepted by Germanist Wolfgang Stammler (d. 1965) and has come to be regarded as the explanation "held in favor" for its word origin.

The Grimms' dictionary had listed the forms klabatermann, klabotermann, klaboltermann, and kabautermännchen and conjectured the word to derive from Low German klabastern 'to knock, or rap'. It was evidently a piece of folk etymology told by lore informants that the name klabatermann derived from the noises they made. Elsewhere, Grimms' dictionary under "kobold" cites Cornelis Kiliaan's Dutch-Latin dictionary (1620) [1574] conjecturing that kaboutermann may derive from cobalus/κόβαλος, where it is glossed in Latin as a "human-imitating demon", and German kobal given as equivalent. Grimm also left a note that the Klabautermann could be tied to the shorter Dutch form kabout meaning "house spirit", found in an 1802 dictionary.

His name has been etymologically related to the caulking hammer, perhaps bridging a gap between the "caulk" and "noise" theories.

Heinrich Schröder thought an earlier form *Klautermann could be reconstructed, derived from verb klettern 'to climb'.

=== Classification ===
The Klabautermann, has been classed as a ship-kobold by some sources.

Müllenhoff's anthology placed No. 431 "Das Klabautermännchen" in the category of "House-kobolds Hauskobolde" Nos. 430–452.

Ludwig Bechstein discusses klabautermann alongside the nis or nis-puk of Northern Germany as being both water sprites as well as house sprites. His chapter under the German title "klabautermännchen" discusses folklore cave-dwelling earth spirits, localized in the Netherlands, where they are called in Dutch kaboutermanneken (cf. § Kaboutermanneken below).

The Klabautermann possibly assimilates or conflates some of the lore of other spiritual beings, such as the Danish skibsnisse or "ship sprite" and the household spirit puk of Northern Germany (cog. puck of English folklore).

== General description ==
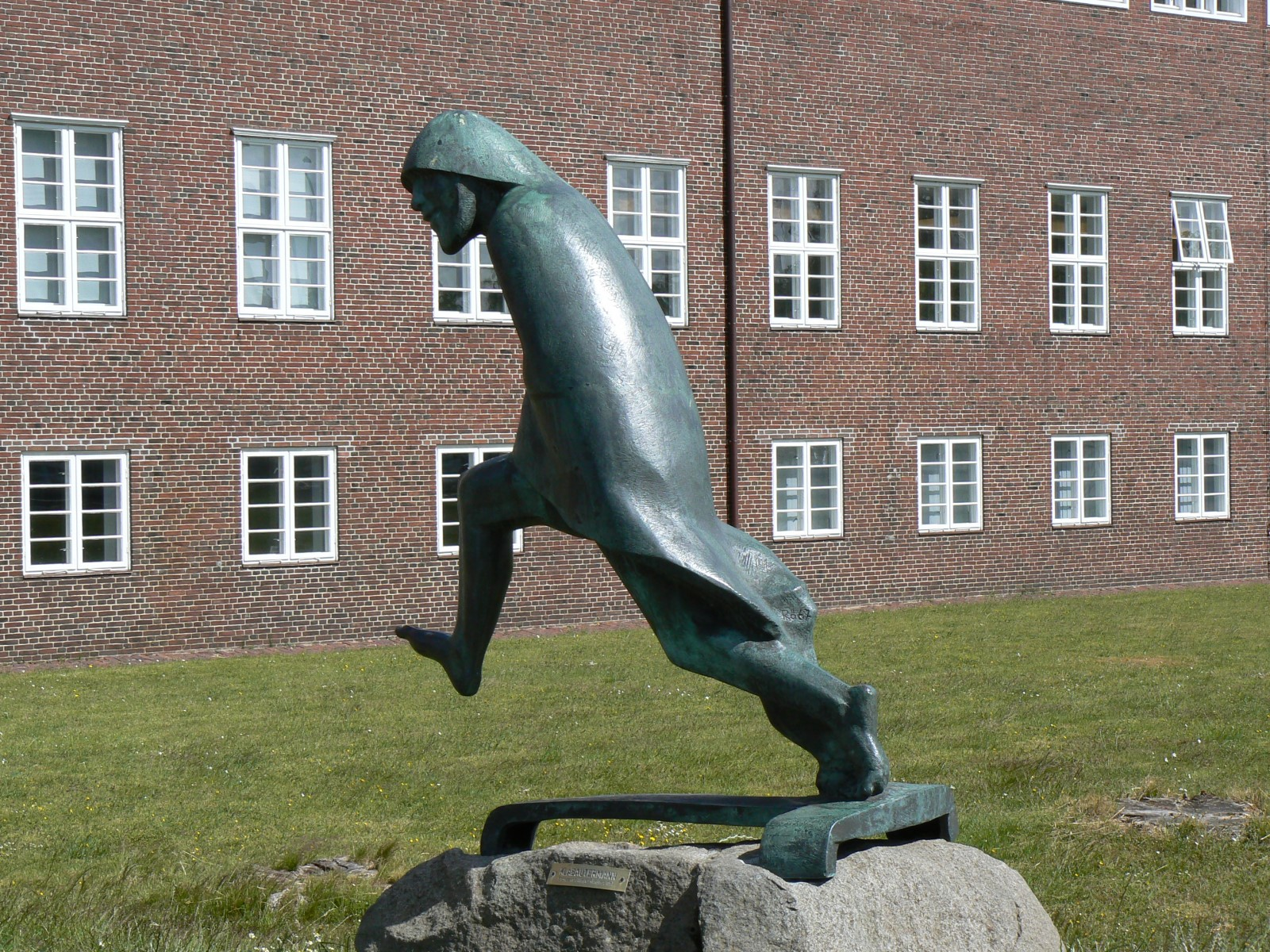
Klabautermann by Walter Rössler (d. 1996) at the maritime museum, Husum, Schleswig-Holstein ―Nordfriesland Museum Nissenhaus

The Klabautermann only shows itself if the ship is doomed to sink, according to lore. Only a few have [lived to] see it, since seeing it was bad luck. The sight of a Klabautermann is an ill omen, and in the 19th century, it was the most feared sight among sailors.

However, when it does appear to humans, it typically appears as a small humanlike figure carrying a tobacco pipe and wearing a nightcap-style sailor's cap and a red or grey jacket. According to one source, the fiery red-headed and white-bearded sprite has green teeth, wears yellow hoses with riding boots, and a "steeple-crowned" pointy hat. (Note: Kuhn&Schwartz (1848), with first mate Werner from Hamburg as informant.) The rarely seen klabautermann (aka Kalfater or "caulker"), according to Pomeranian sources, is about two feet tall, wears a red jacket, a sailor's wide trousers, and a round hat, but others say he is completely naked. Or it may appear in the guise of the ship's carpenter.

The physical descriptions are many and varied according to various sources, as collected by Buss. This likeness is carved and attached to the mast as a symbol of good luck.

An oral source stated there was a way to catch sight of it without danger. One must go alone at night between 12 and 1 o'-clock to the capstan-hole (German: Spillloch), and look between the legs and past the hole. Then the spirit can be seen standing in front of the hole. But if it appears naked, no article of clothing must be given by any means, for it will be enraged at being pitied upon.

The Klabautermann is associated with the wood of the ship on which it lives. He enters the ship via the wood used to build it. A belief existed that if a stillborn or unbaptized child was buried in the heath under a tree, and the wood was then used to build a ship, the child's soul in the form of the klabautermann would transfer onto that ship.
(Also, the superstition recorded from the island of Rügen held that a child who suffered a fracture can be helped towards healing by passing him over a split oak three times at sunrise; that oak bound back together and allowed to grow would eventually host the soul of the mended person, which became a Klabauterman when this timber was used. Feilberg on his monograph on the nisse compares these German examples of skibnsisse to the more general Danish belief that a person's soul, or a wight (vætte) resides in any tree that needs be harvested for timber. (Note: Feilberg states skibsnisse as given on his p. 15 n4, which are in fact the two German accounts, Temme (1840), p. 302 and Baier (1855).)

But the ship's unsinkability was then assured by the spirit's presence. Its presence aboard ship is said to ward against illness, fire, even pirate attack. But there will eventually come a time when the spirit gives up and determines the vessel's seaworthiness will not hold, and decides to leave, in which case the ship is forlorn and is bound to sink (cf. below).

He is said to be usually sitting under the capstan (Ankerwinde, "anchor windlass"). But he makes himself useful to the needs of the ship when in disrepair or struck by a squall, etc., preventing the ship from sinking. Thus he may help pump water from the hold, arrange cargo or ballasts, and hammer away to plug a leak that has sprung until a carpenter arrives at the scene. Objects broken on the ship by day will be magically repaired during the night by the sprite, so that he is also called Klütermann or "joiner", "repairman". However, they can also prankishly tangle up the lines if shipmates are callous about maintaining their tackle. Other informants say that a klabautermann in a bad mood will indicate by noisy actions, throwing firewood around, rapping on the ship's hull, breaking objects, and finally even slapping around the crewmen, thus acquiring his name as noisemaker.

When the ship is beyond saving and will sink, he again turns into a poltergeist, the rancor of him running up and down the ladder of the ship will be heard, ropes will rattle, and the hold will make noises (or it may climb to the tip of the "bow-sprit Boogsprit" or fore-mast and splash into water), at which point it is time for the crew to abandon ship. (Note: Lore of Dornunter Syl in Ostfriesland.) But others say the ship will remain seaworthy and will not sink, that is until he leaves.

The Klabautermann's benevolent behaviour lasts as long as the crew and captain treat the creature respectfully. A Klabautermann will not leave its ship until it is on the verge of sinking. To this end, superstitious sailors in the 19th century demanded that others pay the Klabautermann respect. Ellett has recorded one rumour that a crew even threw its captain overboard for denying the existence of the ship's Klabautermann. Heinrich Heine has reported that one captain created a place for his ship's Klabautermann in his cabin and that the captain offered the spirit the best food and drink he had to offer. The Klabautermann is easily angered. Its ire manifests in pranks such as tangling ropes and laughing at sailors who shirk their chores.

More recently, the Klabautermann is sometimes described as having more sinister attributes, and blamed for things that go wrong on the ship. This incarnation of the Klabautermann is more demon- or goblin-like, prone to play pranks and, eventually, dooming the ship and her crew. This deterioration of the Klabautermann's image probably stems from sailors, upon returning home, telling stories of their adventures at sea. Since life at sea can be rather dull, all creatures—real, mythical, and in between—eventually became the focus of rather ghastly stories.

=== Kaboutermanneken ===
Bechstein applies the Germanized name Klabautermännchen, which he describes as dwarf-like earth spirits dwelling in caves, and are reputed to live in particular areas, of Holland; they are known in Dutch as the kaboter or the Kaboutermanneken. These tales have previously appeared in Johann Wilhelm Wolf's anthology of Dutch folklore.

According to one anecdote, there was a small hill called Kabouterberg, riddled with caverns, where the kaboutermanneken dwelled; this hill was situated near the village of Gelrode (outskirts of Aarschot, Belgium). The miller could leave out his worn-out millstone and hope to have it sharpened by the sprite by offering bread and butter with beer; it would also wash linen. A different version places the Kaboutermannekensberg between Turnhout and Kasterlee in the Belgian part of the Kempen region, with a generally evil reputation of stealing livestock, money, even kitchen utensils. But a miller in Kempenland did obtain the help of the mysterious being who performed work overnight in exchange for the bribe of bread and butter. But after remaining hid to spy on this kaboutermanneken, he discovered the sprite to be stark naked. Then he made the mistake of leaving him clothing, which the sprite gladly took, but would not return to the mill afterwards. The miller attempted to catch the sprite gone wayward, but was outwitted.

According to a version from Landorp (North Brabant province, Netherlands) the klaboutermanneken would do all sorts of household chores: make coffee, milk the cows, clean, and even do the favor of ferrying a man across the Demer. But it played favoritism, and tormented the neighbors with endless pranks, drinking their cow's milk and spoiling their butter.

Beings called Rothmützchen ("redcap" from German Mütze) or klabber reputedly multiplied wood, or rather, it would bring a few scrawny twigs which appeared not to serve much use as kindling, yet once ignited maintained as much fire as a bundle of wood.

In one tale, the kaboutermanneken aided a young man to marry a rich man's daughter by boosting the amount of guilders in his possession from eight hundred to a thousand, the amount stipulated by the bride's father as condition for marriage. Bechstein's embellishment makes the youth only have a paltry sum: "not even a hundred Batzen", or only a few guilders.

== Origins ==
Belief in the Klabautermann dates to at least the 1770s according to the oral source who told Heinrich Heine in 1820s that the lore went back at least fifty years, however, none of the attestations antedate c. 1810s, i.e. no written records exist that are a more than a decade older than when collection of legends were begun in the 1820s.

The two early folkloric sources both come from the North Sea, collected by T. F. M. Richter (1806) from Dutch sailors, and by Heinrich Heine from a sea captain of the Frisian island of Norderney.

German writer Heinrich Smidt believed that the sea kobolds, or Klabautermann, entered German folklore via German sailors who had learned about them in England. However, historians David Kirby and Merja-Liisa Hinkkanen dispute this, finding no evidence of such a belief in Britain. An alternate view connects the Klabautermann myths with the story of Saint Phocas of Sinope. As that story spread from the Black Sea to the Baltic Sea. Scholar Reinhard Buss instead sees the Klabautermann as an amalgamation of early and pre-Christian beliefs mixed with new creatures.

== Literary references ==
In August Kopisch's poem Klabautermann, the poet take literary license to embellish the kalabutermann as a violin-fiddling and dancing gay-spirited musician.

Georg Engel, Hann Klüth, in his novel der Philosoph (1905) has the character Malljohann witnessing a giggling and hand-clapping klabautermann arising out of water. (Note: Engel (1905) Hann Klüth, p. 92.)

The maritime sprite has also appeared in the literary works of Friedrich Gerstäcker, Theodor Storm, and later, Christian Morgenstern.

Klabund, a portmanteau of Klabautermann and Vagabund ('vagabond') was the adopted pen name of writer Alfred Henschke (1890–1928).

In the United States, Henry Wadsworth Longfellow wrote "The Musician's Tale: The Ballad of the Carmilhan" in Tales of a Wayside Inn (1863), in which the "Klaboterman" appears to the crew of the doomed ship Valdemar, saving only the honest cabin boy.

== Sculptural depictions ==
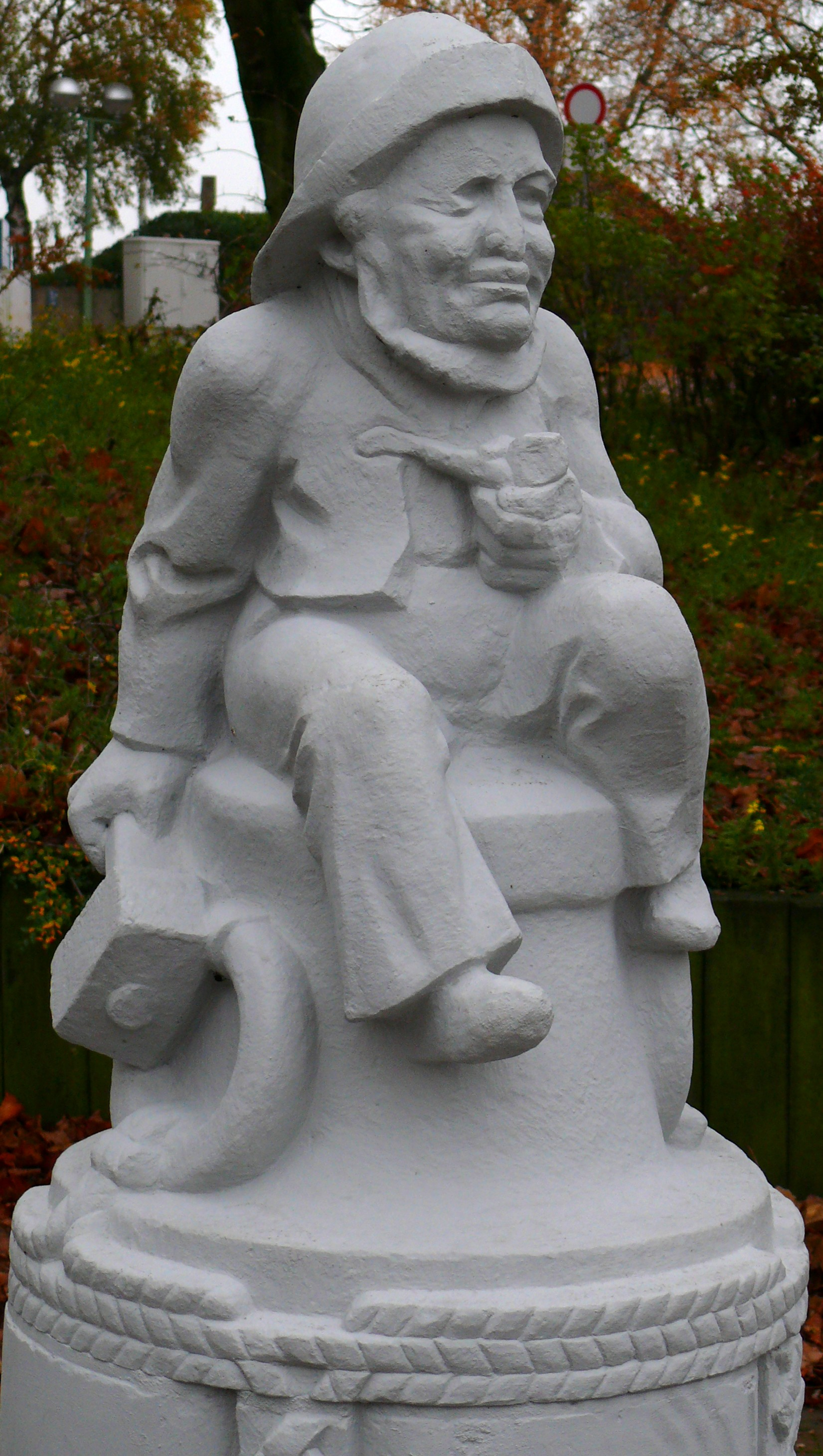
Klabautermann fountain ―Terrace of "Der Wasserschout" restaurant near the German Maritime Museum, Bremerhaven

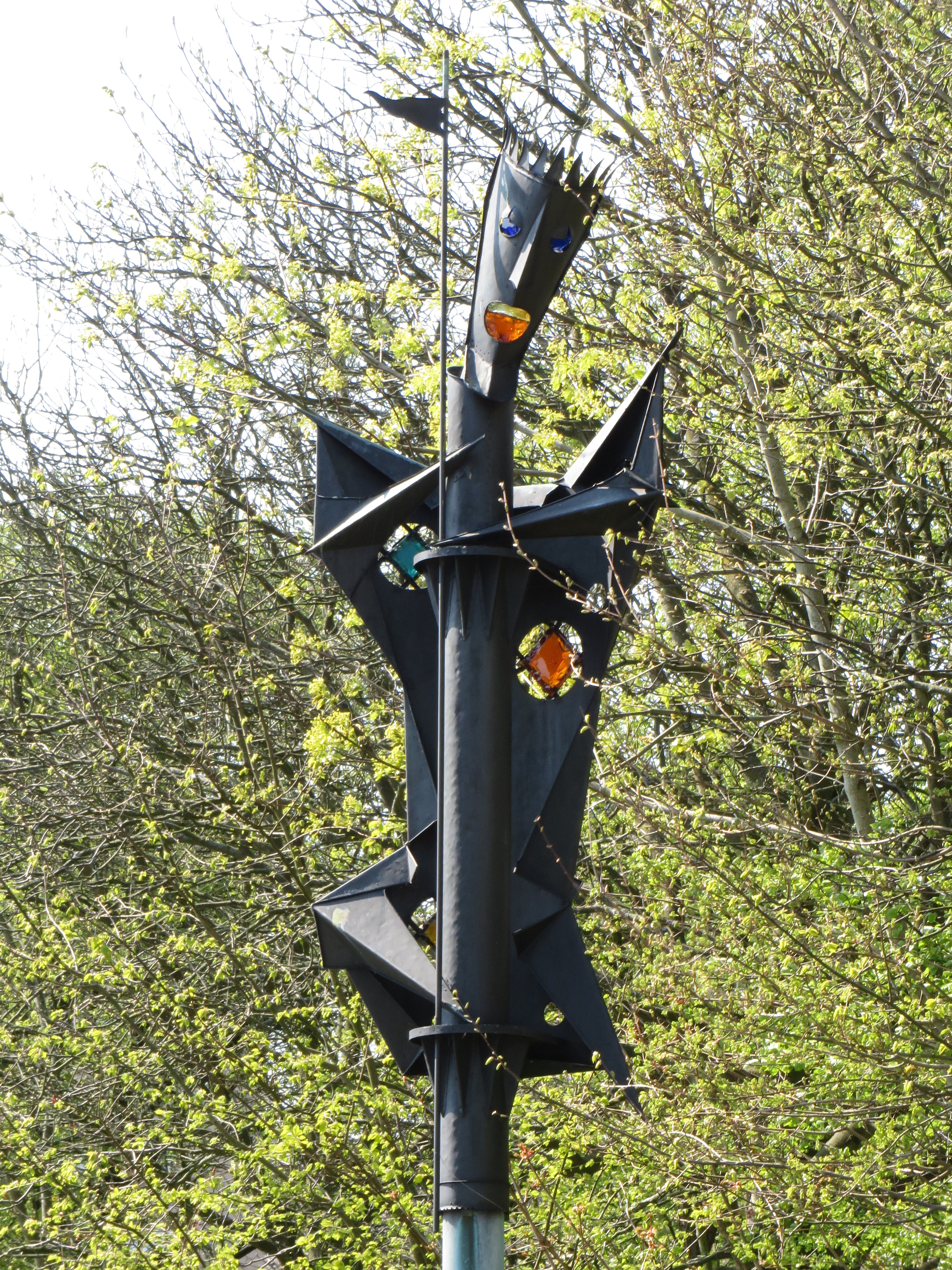
Sculpture by Hermann Sörensen on Osterkoppel Street, Flensburg ―in Friedheim district, Flensburg-Mürwik, Schleswig-Holstein

Several Klabautermann sculptures have been publicly installed. A Klabautermann water fountain built by Hermann Joachim Heinrich Pagels (cf. fig. right) was placed in the schoolyard of Pestalozzischule Bremerhaven (i.e., the Pestalozzianum foundation's school at Bremerhaven) in 1912, but is now relocated near the German Maritime Museum, Bremerhaven.

A bronze sculpture by Walter Rössler (d. 1996) stands at the Nordfriesland Museum Nissenhaus (cf. above).

== In popular entertainment ==
- "Klabautermann" is a variant of the trick-taking card game Doppelkopf, with the side-rule that trumping the queen of spades with the king of that suit gains special points.
- In the manga and anime series One Piece, the pirate ship Going Merry, unknown by the crew, had its own Klabautermann. This Klabautermann fixed the boat when it was too damaged to go on, and spoke to Usopp, telling him not to worry because the boat would carry everyone a little longer. It was later revealed that the repairs the Klabauterman made were only temporary: the ship was too badly damaged to be permanently repaired, and when it sank shortly afterwards, the crew hear the Klabauterman state her farewell as she is dismantled. Franky the upcoming shipwright for the crew said before this, that it is a legend among sailors that could appear when a ship is being cared for well.
- Dschinghis Khan released a single in 1982 called "Klabautermann".
- Pumuckl, a German TV (1980s) and radio (1960s) series Kobold, descends from the dynasty of the Klabautermänner.
- In Hans Fallada's novel Jeder stirbt für sich allein (1947, published in English as Every Man Dies Alone or Alone in Berlin) a Berlin couple Otto and Anna Quangel (based on real life) run a campaign of distributing anti-Nazi postcards, and the Gestapo inspector Kommissar Escherich assigned to apprehend the perpetrator codenames the postcard author "der Klabautermann".
- German band Versengold released in 2025 a single titled "Klabauterfrau", dedicated to a female version of the Klabautermann.
