= Mykhailo Kolodko =

Ukrainian-Hungarian sculptor

- Born: 17 May 1978 (age 48); Uzhhorod, Ukrainian SSR, Soviet Union

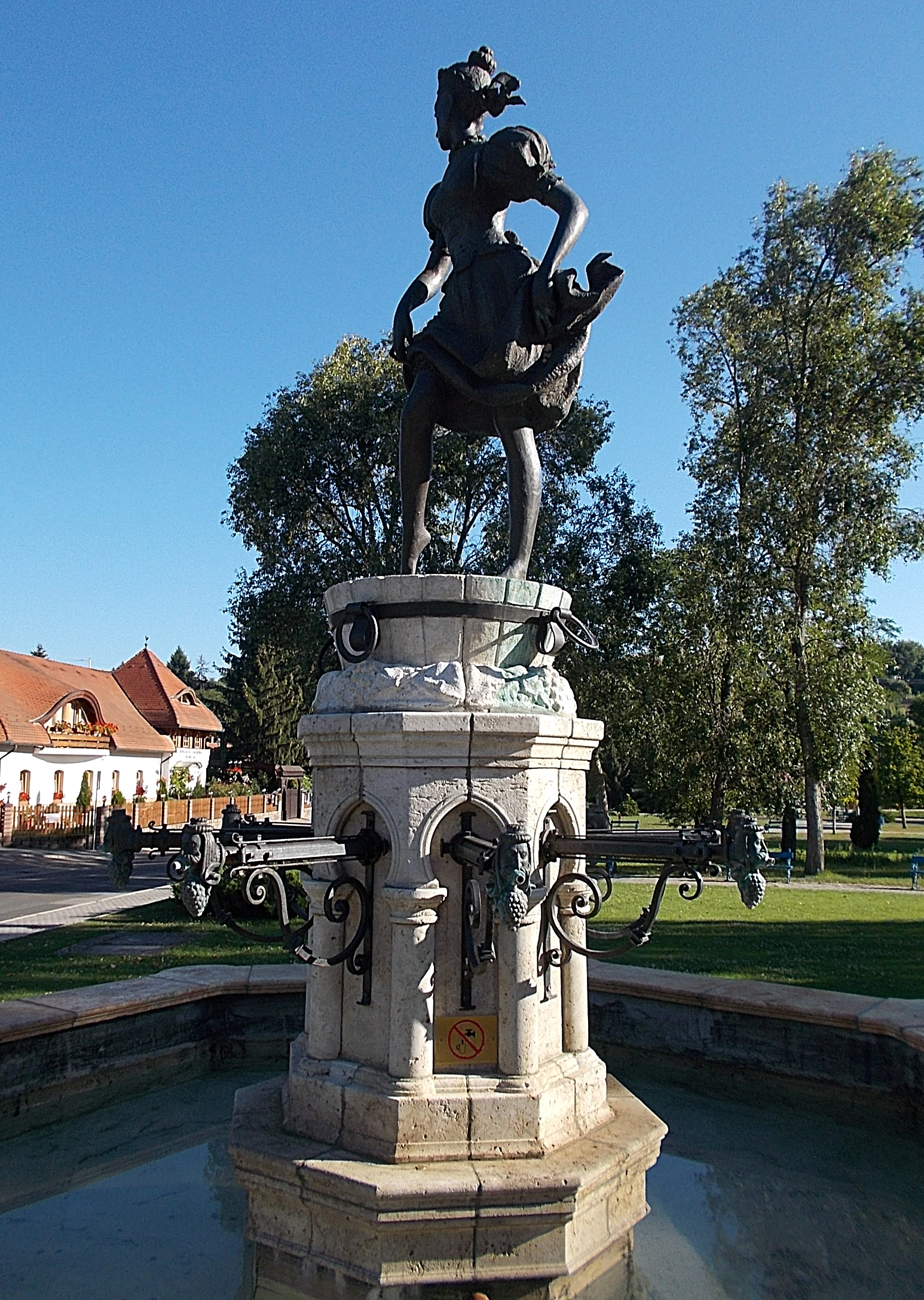
Girl Pressing Grapes (Eger)

Mykhailo Kolodko (Ukrainian: Михайло Іванович Колодко, 17 May 1978 –) is a Ukrainian-Hungarian sculptor.

== Early life ==
Kolodko was born in Uzhhorod, Ukraine. He studied at the Adalbert Erdeli College of Arts (Ukrainian: Фаховий коледж мистецтв ім. Адальберта Ерделі, Hungarian: Erdélyi Béla Művészeti Szakközépiskola) in Uzhhorod, and then at the National Academy of Arts in Lviv, where he graduated as a sculptor in 2002.

Initially, his main interest was in monumental sculpture, but there was not much demand for this after the fall of the Soviet Union. He has created several public statues in Ukraine and Hungary (after moving there in 2017).

== Career ==
His first small-scale statue not commissioned by a government or municipality was the statue of Uncle Kolya the Lamplighter in Uzhhorod in 2010. This was followed by a series of mini-sculptures in Uzhhorod and other towns of the Zakarpattia region of Ukraine, and later in Hungary and other countries, including Poland, Germany, Slovenia and even South Korea.

His first mini-statue in Budapest, Hungary was of a cartoon earthworm based on a popular Hungarian children's television series. The 15 cm tall statue can be found at the bank of the Danube on the Buda side, near Bem rakpart 15. This was followed by several others: a Trabant car, a tank with a drooping barrel in memory of the Hungarian Revolution of 1956, King Francis Joseph I in a hammock, a collection of puppies scattered around a small square etc. The tiny statues quickly became popular, so much so that several got stolen. For example, the Mekk Elek statue (another popular Hungarian cartoon character) on Széll Kálmán tér had to be replaced after it disappeared.

Most of his statues are unsigned; two exceptions are the statue of painter Ignác Roskovics (the original is in Uzhhorod; there is a copy in Budapest), which is signed "Kolodko" on the pencil and the mini-statue of a Roman legionary at the Roman amphiteatre of Aquincum in Budapest, which is signed on the plume of the helmet.

== Gallery ==
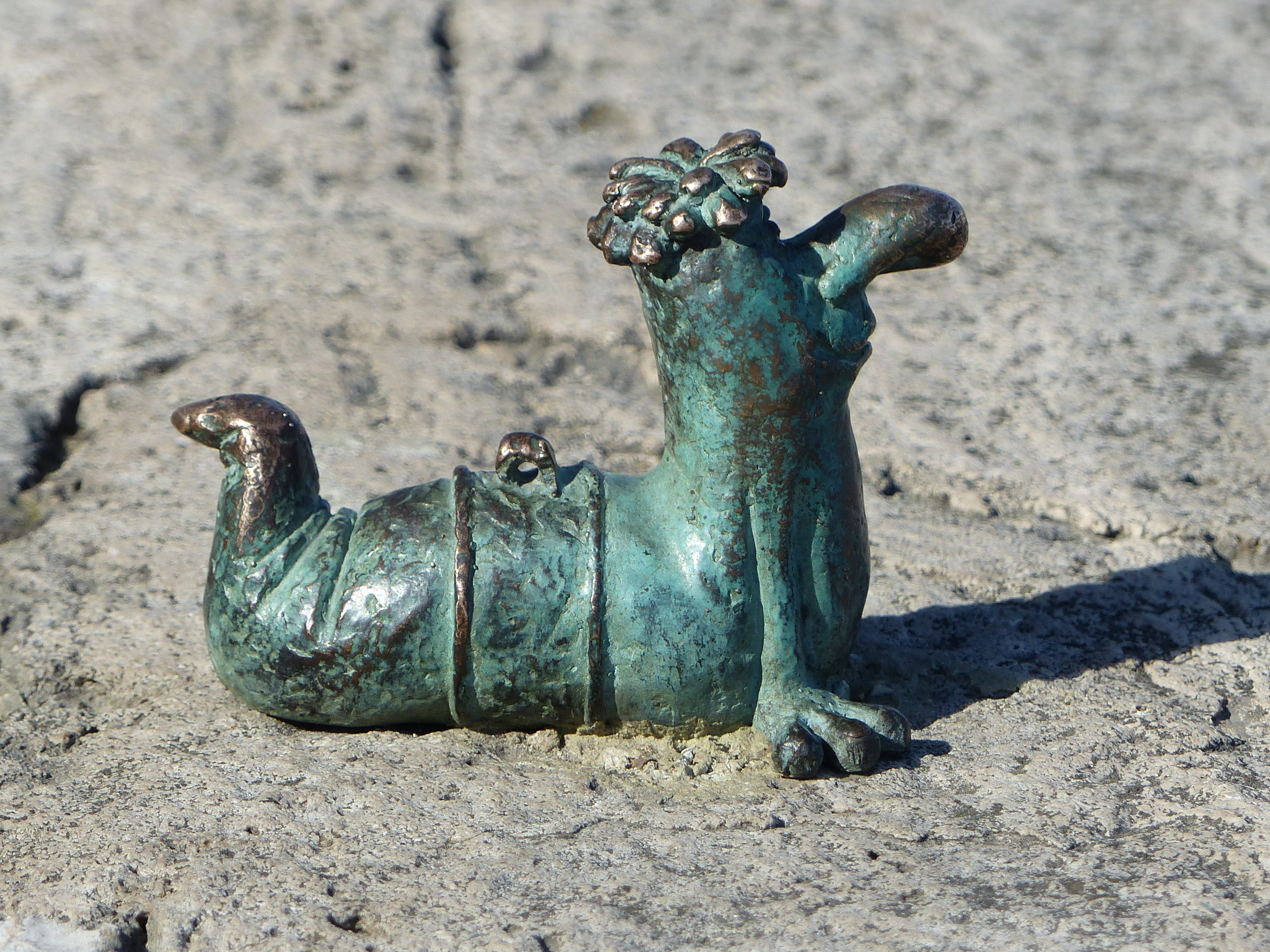
Mr Worm from the Hungarian children's television series A nagy ho-ho-horgász

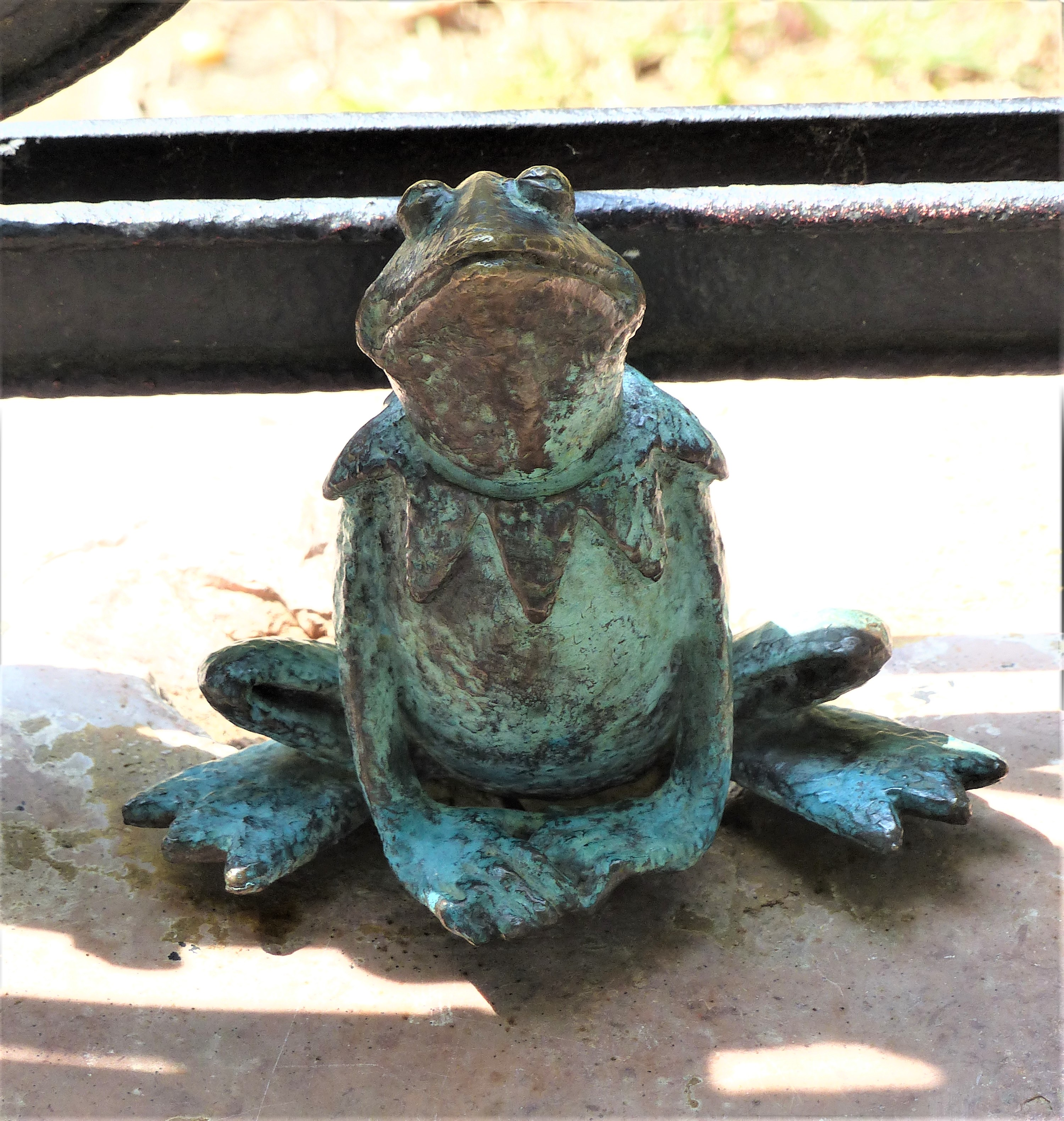
Kermit from The Muppet Show, a copy of the mini-statue in Perechyn, Ukraine

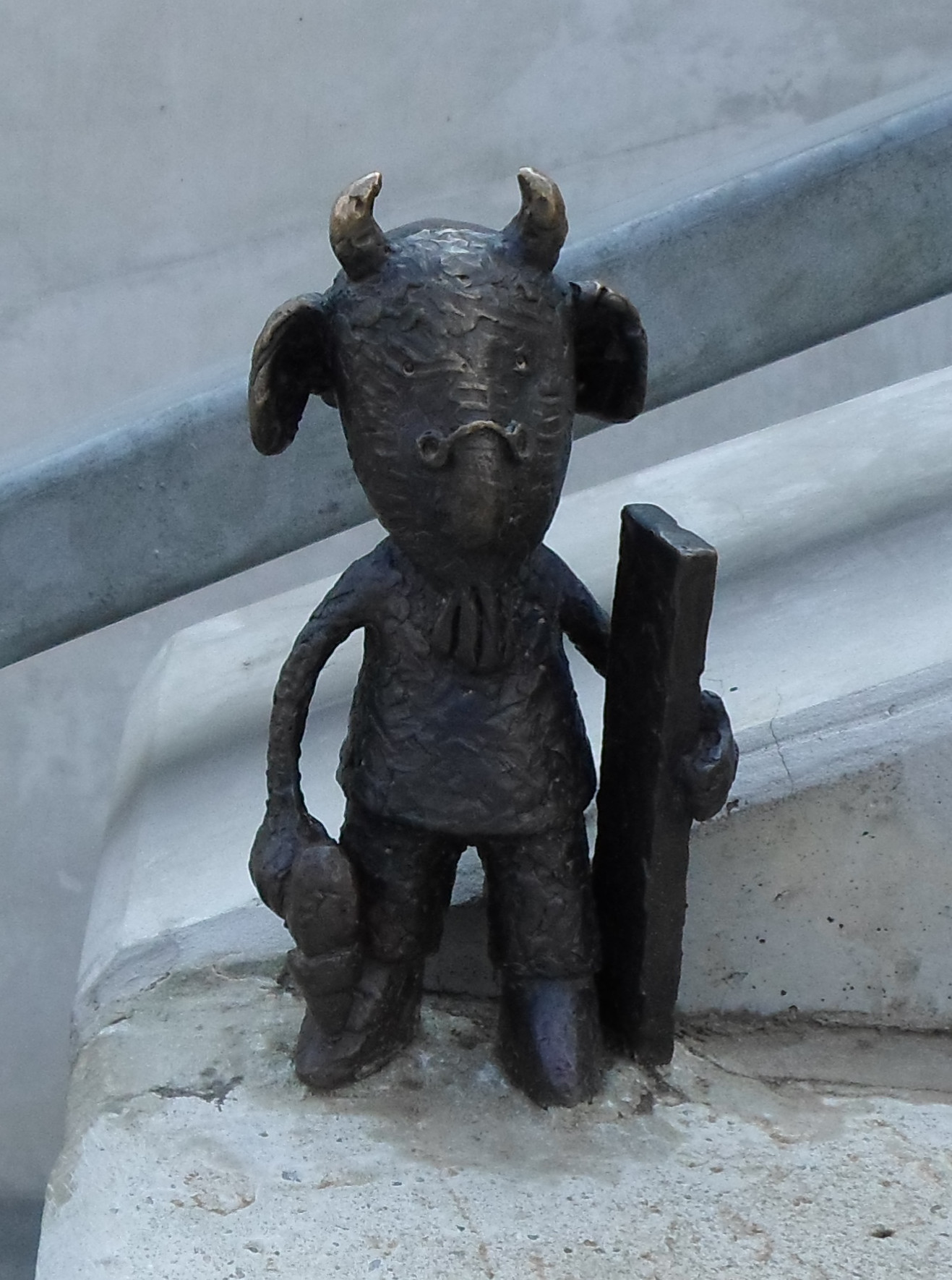
Mekk Elek, the handyman goat from another children's television series

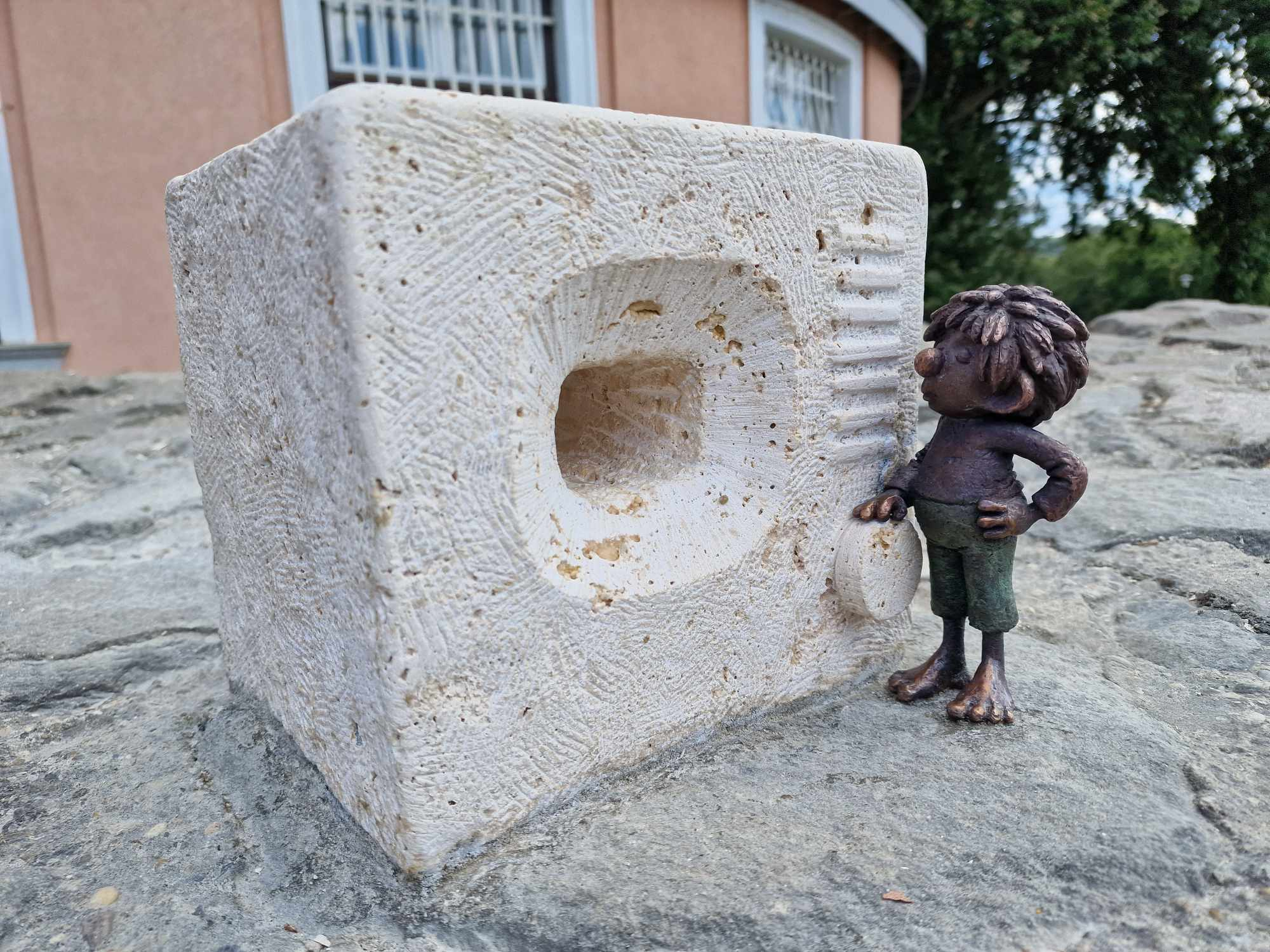
Mini-statue of Pumuckl in Esztergom, Hungary
