= Barbara von Johnson =

German illustrator and artist

Barbara von Johnson (born 1942) is a German illustrator and artist. She was the first designer of the fairy-tale figure Pumuckl, a Kobold, which she designed in a competition to illustrate a story by Ellis Kaut.

== Life ==
She has three sons has lived and worked in Munich and Greece.

From 1962 to 1966 she trained as a commercial artist and also regularly attended the International Summer Academy for graphic arts in Salzburg, where she took courses in watercolor and where her teachers included Oskar Kokoschka. At the age of 21 she won a competition at the academy for the visualization of Pumuckl.

By 1978 she illustrated ten Pumuckl books and 33 Pumuckl record sleeves. In addition as a freelance illustrator, she illustrated 20 children's books, 28 textbooks, five games, twenty four workbooks, and produced many illustrations for children's magazines. By 1983 she worked primarily as a freelance artist. She completed training in art therapy and has conducted numerous training and study tours.

From 1990 her works started to dissolve the barriers between painting, art objects and photographs, exploring the transitional zones between the various mediums. Her work draws from her early efforts at surface pictural composition by caricature and superimposed structures.

== Litigation ==
Barbara von Johnson describes herself as the "optical mother of Pumuckl." From 2003 to 2007, she was involved in several lawsuits regarding her credits and release of copyright in the Pumuckl films as well as her right to promote her local painting competition for children to design a girlfriend for Pumuckl. In 2006 she settled out of court for back royalties and attribution, and in 2007, the courts ruled in her favor allowing her to cite Pumuckl in her own artistic work including her competition. She did receive criticism from Pumuckl fans when her attorney, in an effort to protect her copyright claim, requested the Pumuckl image be removed from fan internet sites because they lacked attribution to Barbara von Johnson.
