= Pantaloon =

Pantaloon (from Italian Pantalone), is a traditional type of pants in 16th-century Italian Commedia dell'arte.

Pantaloon or Pantaloons may also refer to:

== Theatre ==
- Pantaloon, a character in the Harlequinade
- The Pantaloons, a British touring theatre company
- The pantaloon, sixth character in the Seven Ages of Man speech from Shakespeare's As You Like It Act II Scene VII. "All the world's a stage..."
- The Pantaloon, penultimate painting from Smirke's The Seven Ages of Man (painting series)

== Other ==
- Pantaloons, a style of trousers originally modelled after the Pantaloon character
- Pantaloons, modern baggy trousers
- "The Pantaloon", a song by Twenty One Pilots from Twenty One Pilots (album).
- HMS Pantaloon, two ships of the Royal Navy
- Pantaloons Retail, a large retailer in India, later renamed

== See also ==
- Pantalon, a musical instrument
- Pantalone, a character in the Italian commedia dell'arte
- Pantaloon hernia, the coexistence of direct and indirect hernias descending either side of the epigastric artery
