= Hans Clarin =

German actor

- Born: Hans-Joachim Schmid; 14 September 1929; Wilhelmshaven, Germany
- Died: 28 August 2005 (aged 75); Aschau im Chiemgau, Germany
- Occupation: Actor
- Years active: 1952–2005
- Awards: Staatsschauspieler (Bavaria), 1961; Federal Order of Merit (1994); Bavarian Order of Merit (1997)

Hans Clarin (14 September 1929 – 28 August 2005) was a German actor. He became a well-known voice actor of characters in children audio plays, particularly the kobold Pumuckl (including its TV and cinematic film adaptations), the German voice of René Goscinny and Albert Uderzo's diminutive Gaulish hero Asterix (in circa 30 German audioplay adaptations of the Asterix comic books, produced and published 1986-1992 under the Europa label), and the ghost Hui Buh.

== Biography ==
Clarin was born Hans-Joachim Schmid in Wilhelmshaven, and grew up in Frankfurt am Main. After graduation he studied acting in Munich from 1948 to 1950. He made his début appearance in 1950 in Franz Grillparzer's play Weh dem, der lügt ("Woe to him who lies"). From 1952 until 1967 he was employed by the Bavarian State Theatre in Munich, where he appeared in plays such as A Midsummer Night's Dream, Leonce and Lena, Woyzeck and The Blue Angel, and gained a reputation as a character actor who excelled in both comic and dramatic roles, as well as musicals and opera.

He made his first appearance on film in 1952, playing the title role in Zwerg Nase, based on a fairy tale by Wilhelm Hauff. He went on to appear in over 100 television and feature films, including The Haunted Castle (1960), The Indian Scarf (1963) and Pippi Longstocking (1969).

On television, he gained popularity through roles in the series Weißblaue Geschichten (1985), Fest im Sattel (1988), Rivalen der Rennbahn (1989), Peter und Paul (1992), Titus, der Satansbraten (1997), as well as making appearances in the long running crime series Ein Fall für zwei, Der Alte and Tatort. Between 1995 and 2000 he appeared in five productions by the Chiemgauer Volkstheater.

Clarin was also a voice artist, dubbing the voice for "Kookie" Kookson in the US series 77 Sunset Strip, and playing the title role in the children's audio series Hui Buh and Pumuckl.

On 28 August 2005 Clarin died aged 75, in his adopted hometown of Aschau im Chiemgau, of heart failure.

== Awards and honours ==
Clarin was made a Bavarian Staatsschauspieler ("State Actor") in 1961, and was awarded the Federal Order of Merit in 1994 and the Bavarian Order of Merit in 1997. In May 2006 the Bahnhofsplatz in Aschau im Chiemgau was renamed Hans-Clarin-Platz in his honour.

== Personal life ==
Clarin was married three times; first to Irene Reiter, with whom he had three daughters. With his second wife, Margarethe, Freiin von Cramer-Klett, he had a son Philip and a daughter Anne. In 1995 Clarin married his third wife Christa Maria, Gräfin von Hardenberg.

== Selected filmography ==
- The Last Illusion (1949)
- Dear Miss Doctor (1954), as Cicero
- Fireworks (1954)
- Doctor Solm (1955), as Benvenuto Berding
- The Spessart Inn (1958), as Peter
- Arms and the Man (1958)
- The Girl with the Cat's Eyes (1958), as Stückchen
- The Beautiful Adventure (1959), as Polyte
- The Haunted Castle (1960), as Prince Kalaka
- Stage Fright (1960) as Himself
- Flying Clipper (1962) – Narrator
- Max the Pickpocket (1962), as Fred
- The Indian Scarf (1963), as Lord Edward Lebanon
- Mark of the Tortoise (1964), as Harry Mason
- Room 13 (1964)
- 24 Hours to Kill (1965), as Elias
- Angel Baby (1968), as Count
- Pippi Longstocking (1969), as Dunder-Karlsson
- A Woman Needs Loving (1969), Psychiatrist
- Die Jugendstreiche des Knaben Karl (1977), as Hairdresser
- Es begann bei Tiffany (1979, TV film), as Waldo Meyer
- Meister Eder und sein Pumuckl (1982), as Pumuckl (voice)
- Meister Eder und sein Pumuckl (1982–1999, TV series), as Pumuckl (voice)
- Mandara (1983, TV miniseries) as Lodders
- A Slip of the Disc (1987, TV film), as Herr Wilhelm
- A Touch of Danger (1988, TV film), as Mr. Wadilow
- Hochwürden erbt das Paradies (1993, TV film), as Gustav
- Pumuckl und der blaue Klabauter (1994), as Pumuckl (voice)
- Pinky and the Million Dollar Pug (2001), as Jonathan Morgan
- Hui Buh: The Goofy Ghost (2006), as Castellan

== Works ==
- Clarin, Hans (1995). Durchgeblättert [Leafed Through]. Berlin: Knaus. ISBN 3-8135-4005-7. (Autobiography)
