= Chiemgauer Volkstheater =

German folk theatre company

- Address: Bavaria, Germany; Munich; Germany
- Type: Folk theatre

Construction
- Opened: 1929

Website
- www.chiemgauer-volkstheater.de

Chiemgauer Volkstheater (Chiemgau People's Theatre) is a German folk theatre company based in Bavaria, Germany. It is one of the most well-known theatres specializing in traditional Bavarian folk plays and has been a staple of regional entertainment for decades.

== History ==
The Chiemgauer Volkstheater was founded in 1929 and has since played a significant role in preserving and promoting Bavarian culture and dialect theater. The theatre became widely known for its televised stage productions, which have been broadcast on Bayerischer Rundfunk (BR) since the 1980s.

Throughout its history, the theatre has performed numerous comedic and dramatic plays, often incorporating Bavarian traditions and humor.

== Notable actors ==
Over the years, many well-known actors have performed with the Chiemgauer Volkstheater, including:

Bernd Helfrich – Longtime director and lead actor
Kathi Leitner – Famous for her comedic roles
Franziska Traub – Known for her appearances in Bavarian folk plays
Inge Holzer-Siebert – Notable actress in Bavarian television and theatre

== Television and Media ==
The theatre gained nationwide recognition through its television productions, which brought Bavarian folk theatre into homes across Germany. The plays are characterized by humor, traditional settings, and moral lessons, often set in rural Bavarian villages.
