= Gustl Bayrhammer =

German actor (1922–1993)

- Born: Adolf Gustav Rupprecht Maximilian Bayrhammer; 12 February 1922; Munich, Bavaria, Germany
- Died: 24 April 1993 (aged 71); Krailling, Bavaria, Germany
- Occupation: Actor
- Years active: 1964–1993

Adolf Gustav Rupprecht Maximilian "Gustl" Bayrhammer (12 February 1922 – 24 April 1993) was a Bavarian actor. He appeared in more than 70 films and television shows between 1964 and 1993. He starred in the 1970 film o.k., which was entered into the 20th Berlin International Film Festival. However, the competition was cancelled and no prizes were awarded, over controversy surrounding the film. He is mostly known for his role as Meister Eder in the 1980s children's show Meister Eder und sein Pumuckl.

== Selected filmography ==
- o.k. (1970)
- Student of the Bedroom (1970)
- Mathias Kneissl (1970)
- Tatort (1971–1981, TV series), as Melchior Veigl
- The Sternstein Manor (1976)
- Die Jugendstreiche des Knaben Karl (1977)
- Sachrang (1978, TV miniseries)
- Meister Eder und sein Pumuckl (1982)
- Meister Eder und sein Pumuckl (1982–1989, TV series)
- Non-Stop Trouble with Spies (1983)
- Success (1991)
- Pumuckl und der blaue Klabauter (1993/94)
