= Widenmayerstraße =

Street in Lehel, Munich, Germany

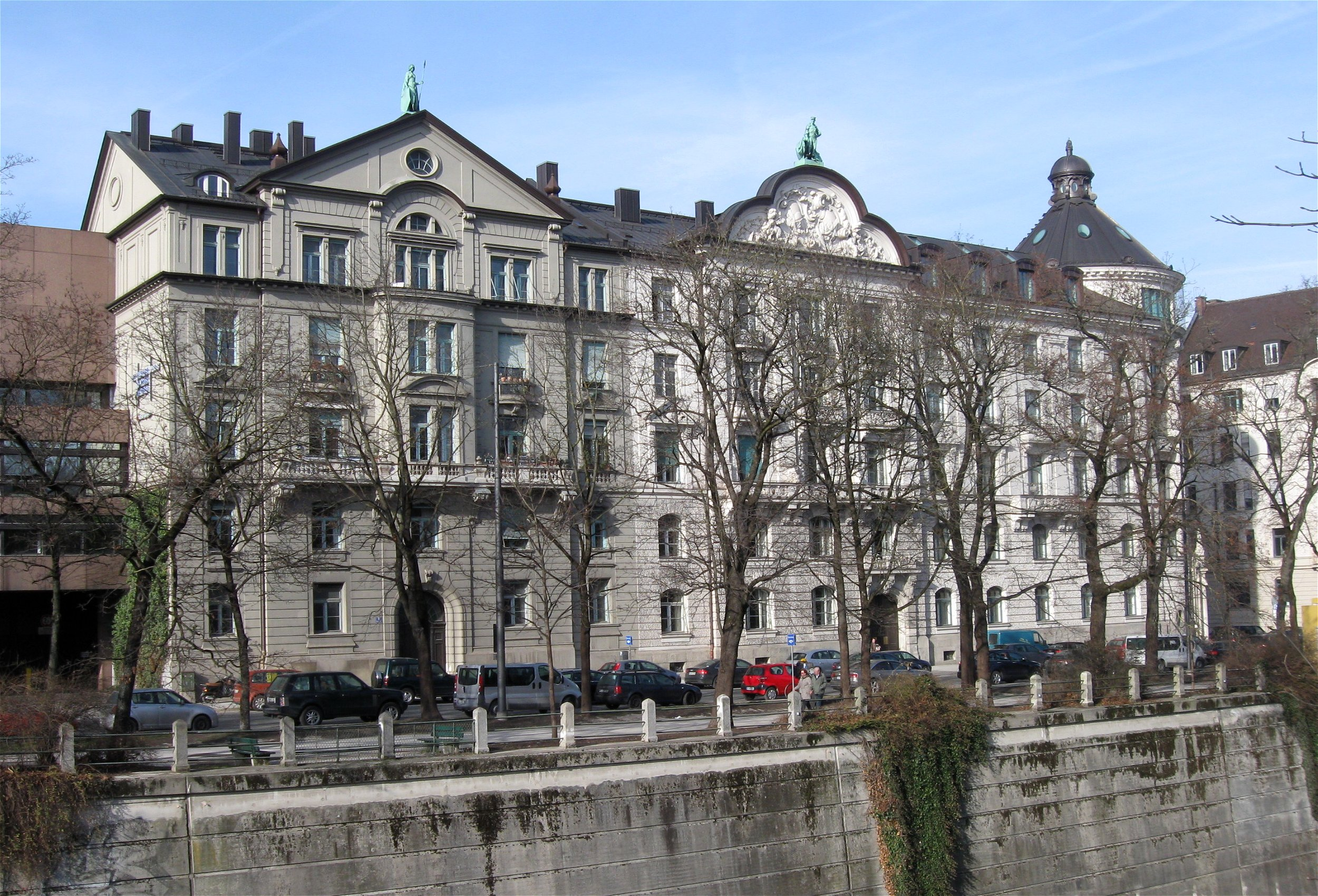
Monumentally protected group of houses at the beginning of Widenmayerstraße

The Widenmayerstraße is an inner city street in the Munich district of Lehel. It is registered as a protected ensemble in the Bavarian protected monument list.

== Location ==
The street is located on the eastern edge of Munich's Lehel district. It runs along the River Isar from Maximilians Bridge to Max-Joseph Bridge. To the east of Widenmayerstraße is the Isarpromenade with the Isar quays.

== History ==
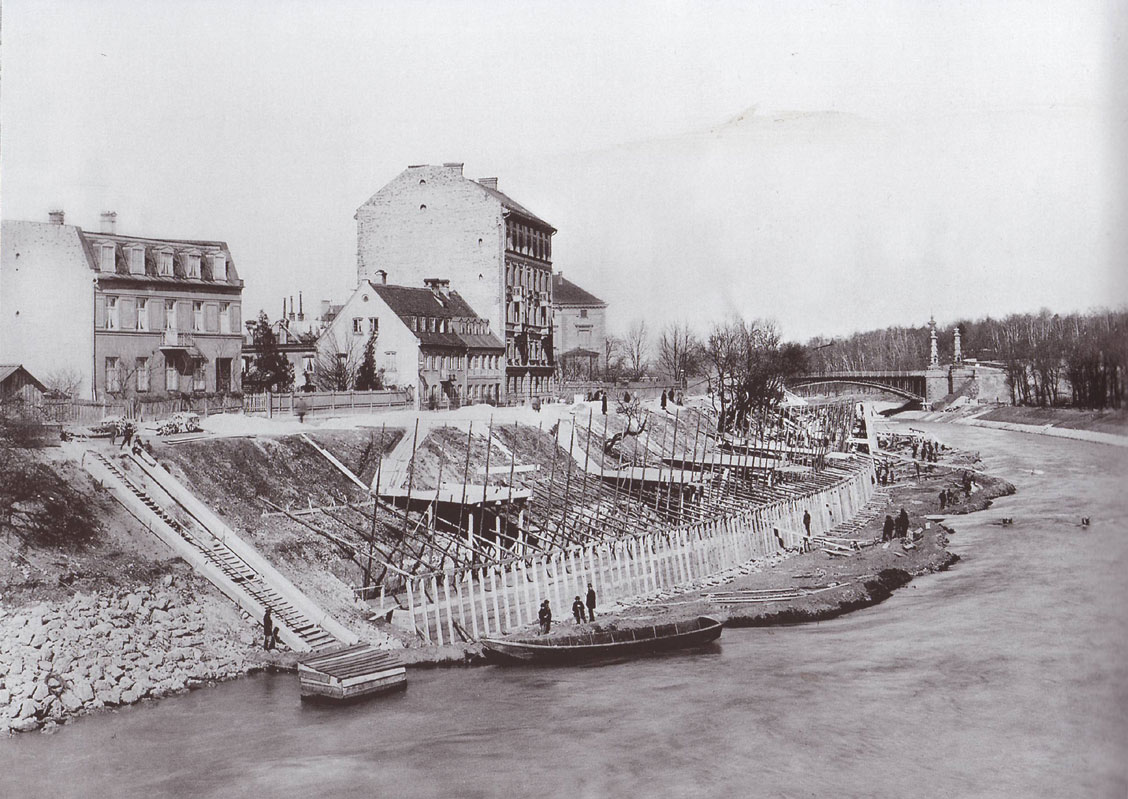
Construction of the bank fortification of the Isar on the Widenmayerstraße around 1893

Before 1890 there were only two buildings on the road running along the Isar, which was then called the Äußere Isarstraße. These were the No. 11, a three-storey wooden house built in 1877, and No. 15, the Hanfstaengl Villa, built in 1888. Both buildings were destroyed during World War II.

At approximately the same time as quay walls were built at the Isar, around 1893/94, the further development of the road took place, which in 1896, was named after Johannes von Widenmayer, the mayor of Munich, who died in 1893. The Innere Isarstraße running parallel to the Hofhammerschmiedbach was abandoned and became part of the building plots, the brook itself was overgrown and partially overbuilt.

The development was predominantly from south to north, initially in the style of late historicism, then baroque and classical. Until 1899, the two most southerly building blocks had been completed. In 1900, the northernmost house (No. 52) was erected on the corner of Tivolistraße, which only 12 years later got a southern neighbor.

As the only house between Widenmayerstraße and Isar, the gymnasium of the gymnastic and sports club TS Jahn München was established in 1904. After World War II, it remained as a ruin and was only demolished in 1962/63 for the planned widening of the road.

In addition to houses no. 10 (1902) and 12 (1905/06), the building was not continued until 1909. In 1911-12, the unitary assembly No. 46-51, was set back from the escape line of the other buildings and erected against them. Most of the buildings were erected at the beginning of World War I, but the last vacancy (No. 17) was only completed in 1986.

The damage caused by World War II varied: some houses were only slightly damaged, others could be repaired, others had to be demolished. The new buildings erected there were optimally adapted to the surrounding environment.

== Description ==
The Widenmayerstraße is only built on its western side. The buildings are consecutively numbered so that on this side there are both even as well as odd house numbers. The developments are typically four to five-storey.

The Isarpromenade east of the road is lined with two tree rows like an alley. A bicycle path runs between the Isarpromenade and the road, and parking lots are located on both sides of the two-lane road.

== Highlighted buildings ==
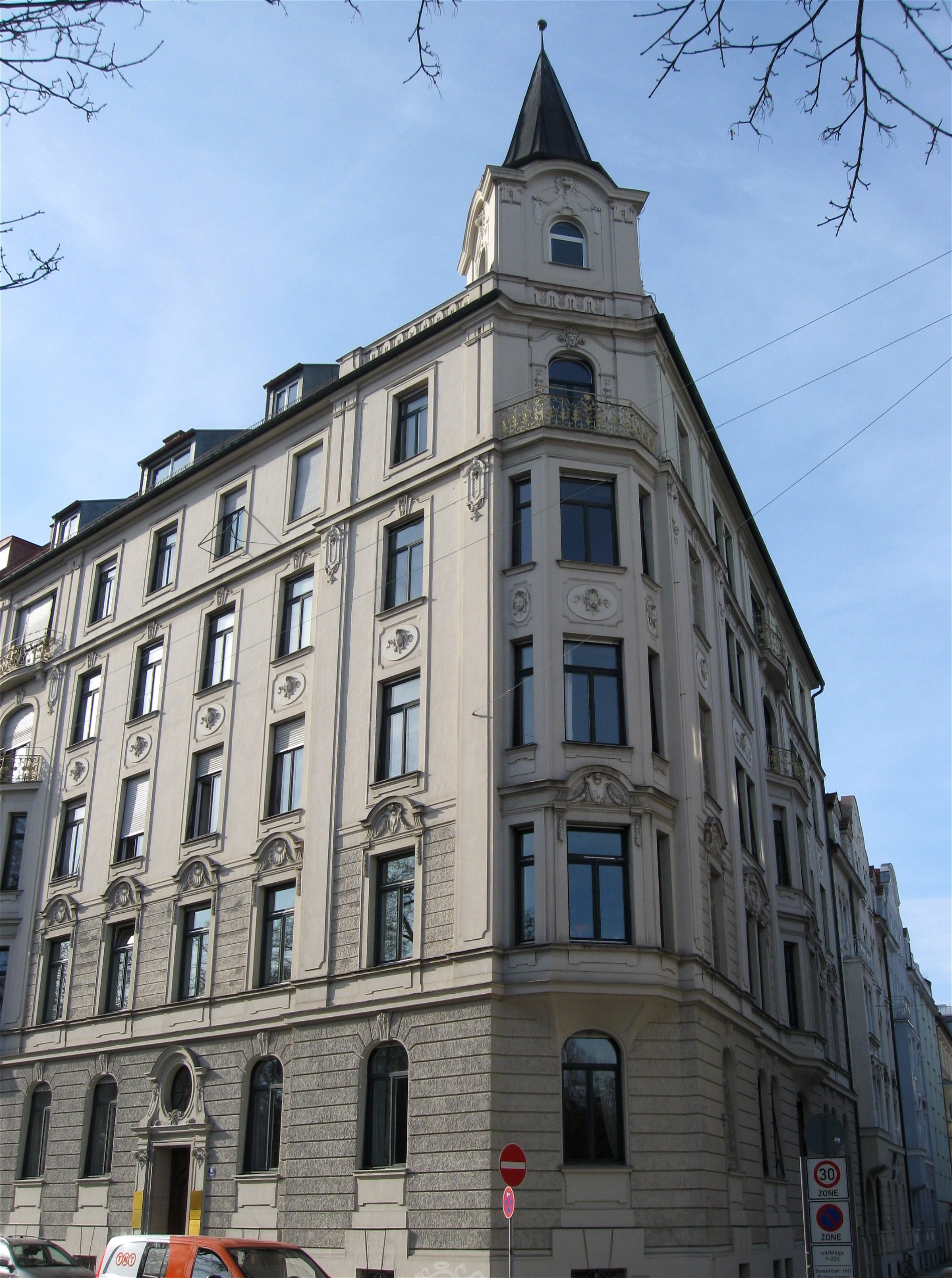
Widenmayerstraße 6

Particularly prominent are some corner buildings, e.g. Through a round pavilion or a tower attachment on the road corner.

Many buildings in Widenmayerstraße are also listed as individual monuments under monument protection: houses 2, 3, 4, 5, 6, 7, 8, 9, 10, 12, 16, 18, 23, 25 / 25a, 27, 28, 29, 31, 32, 34, 36, 37, 38, 41, 42, 43, 44, 45, 46a, 46 Steps I, 47, 48, 49, 50, 51 and 52.

The houses with the numbers 46 to 52 are located at the wider northern end of the road and form a single assembly, the backside of which is located on the Eisbach.

The buildings with the house numbers 3 (2007), 10 (2003), 16 (1999), 23 (2007) and 28 were awarded the facade award of the state capital Munich. The building with the house number 9 received a praiseworthy mention as a building in public sponsorship (2005).

== Traffic ==
The Widenmayerstraße is part of the Isarparallele, which forms a cross-link from the north (Kennedybrücke) to the south (Brudermühlbrücke) within the Mittlerer Ring and from there further south to the district of Thalkirchen where it leads to the Bundesstraße 11.

Over a large part, the Widenmayerstraße is a one-way street from the south to the north. The parallel road from Emil-Riedel-Straße, Oettingenstraße and Sternstraße is used by the traffic from north to south. Only the northern part, on which the underpass begins under the Tivolistraße, is navigable in both directions.
