= Ellis Kaut =

German author of children's books (1920–2015)

- Born: November 17, 1920; Stuttgart, Weimar Republic
- Died: September 24, 2015 (aged 94); Fürstenfeldbruck, Germany
- Occupations: Children’s writer; illustrator

Elisabeth "Ellis" Kaut (17 November 1920 – 24 September 2015) was a German author of children's literature, best known for her creation of Pumuckl, a kobold appearing in radio plays and TV series. She also published novellas and some illustrated books.

== Life ==
Ellis Kaut was born in Stuttgart. Her parents moved to Munich with her when she was two years old. In 1938, aged 18, Ellis Kaut was elected the first official Münchner Kindl for that year. In 1939 she married author Kurt Preis, continuing to live in Munich. They had a daughter, Ursula, born in March 1945. Ellis Kaut trained as an actor, and later studied sculpting. From 1948 she was a freelance author and also had some speaking parts in radio plays in the 1950s and 1960s. She supervised children's programmes at Bayerischer Rundfunk, but was also active as a painter and photographer. In a 2010 interview, Ellis Kaut said that writing had always been hard work for her.

Ellis Kaut's husband died in 1991. Her last place of residence was in the district of Pasing in Munich. She died after a long illness on 24 September 2015, aged 94, in a nursing home near Fürstenfeldbruck.

== Honors and awards ==
- 1938: First Münchner Kindl
- 1955: Bayerischer Hörspielpreis
- 1971: Schwabinger Kunstpreis
- 1980: Cross of Merit 1st Class of Verdienstorden der Bundesrepublik Deutschland
- 1980: Medal „München leuchtet“
- 1984: Ernst-Hoferichter-Preis
- 1985: Bayerischer Verdienstorden
- 1992: Bayerischer Poetentaler
- 1999: Oberbayerischer Kulturpreis
- 2001: Pro meritis scientiae et litterarum
- 2002: Bayerische Verfassungsmedaille in silver
