= WAAhnsinn – Der Wackersdorf-Film =

WAAhnsinn Der Wackersdorf-Film
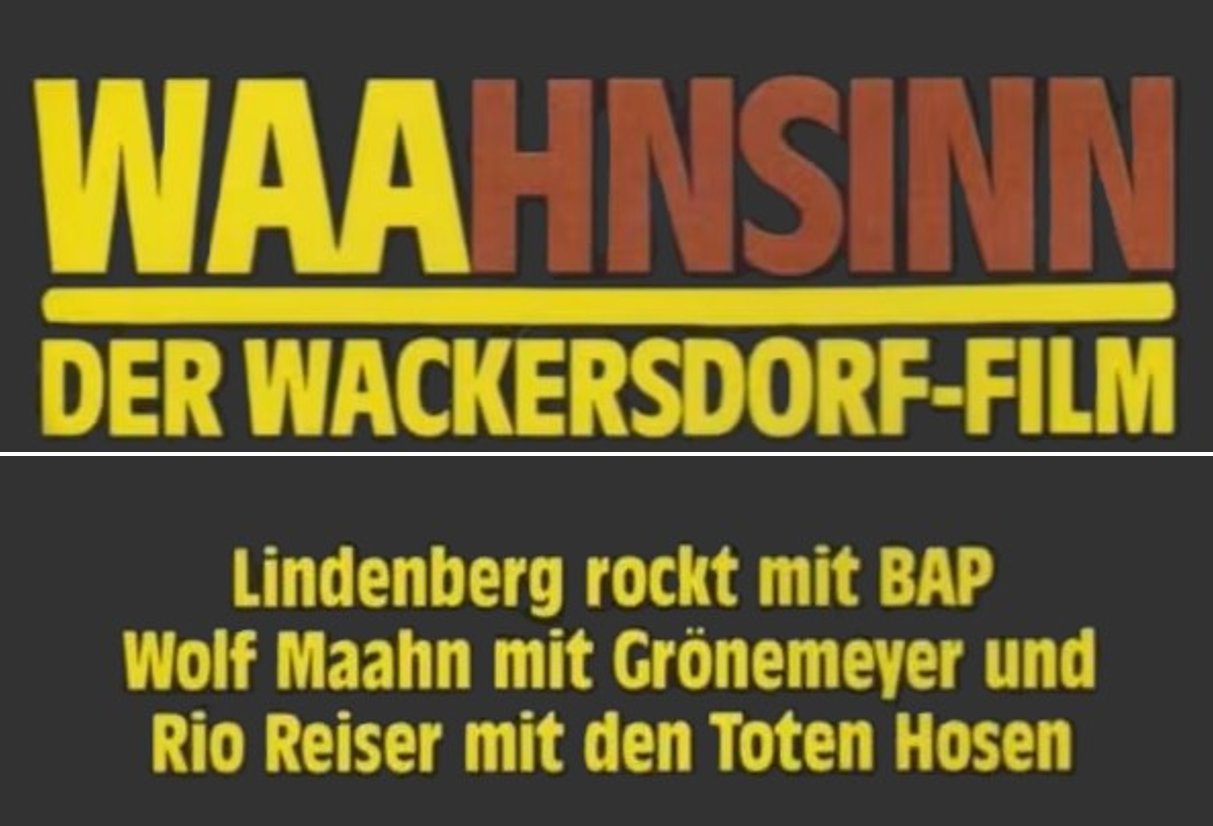
- Directed by: Helge Cramer; Michael Herl; Christian Wagner; Uwe Heitkamp
- Release date: 1986 (Germany)
- Running time: 94 minutes
- Country: Germany
- Language: German

WAAhnsinn – Der Wackersdorf-Film (WAAhnsinn – The Wackersdorf Film) is a German documentary film from 1986. The music documentary was produced as part of the 5th Anti-WAAhnsinns Festival in Burglengenfeld (Bavaria). It was financed by Upper Palatinate citizens' initiatives that were working together against the Wackersdorf reprocessing plant (WAA). All participants waived their salaries and fees.

After its completion, the film was screened at several film festivals. It won the award for Best Socially Critical Film at the Alpinale. A significantly more extensive video reconstruction of the entire footage, created by Helge Cramer in 1987, was also shown at several festivals under the title WAAhnrock.

== Content ==
The film reports on the fifth Anti-WAAhnsinns Festival, which took place in Burglengenfeld on July 26 and 27, 1986, just 90 days after the Chernobyl disaster. The festival marked the culmination of the citizens' protests against the Wackersdorf reprocessing plant. With approximately 100,000 to 120,000 attendees, it was the largest rock concert in German history up to that point.

== Synopsis ==
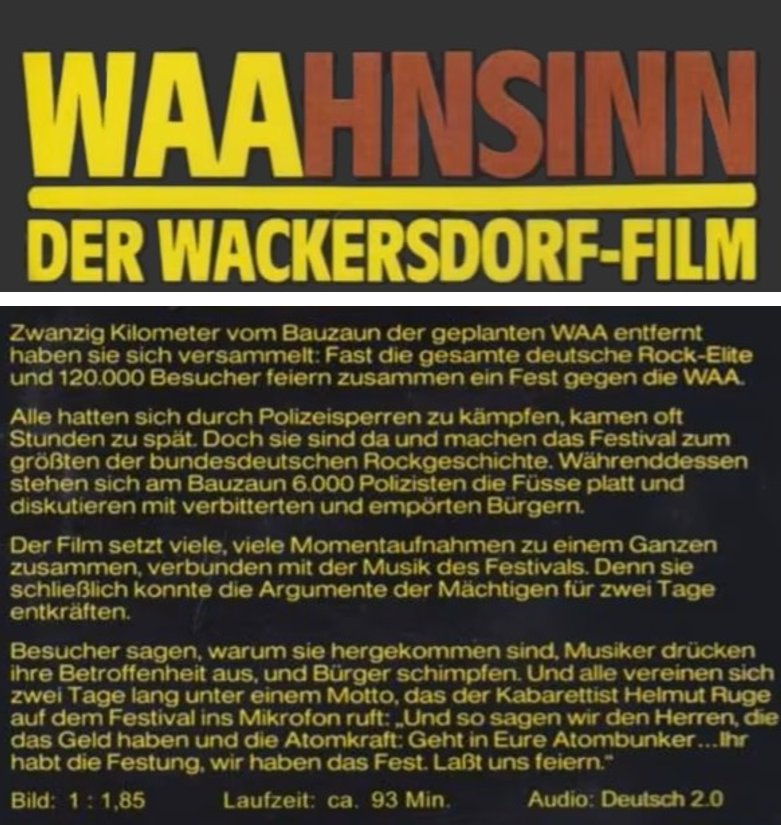
Synopsis – blurb

They have gathered twenty kilometers away from the construction fence of the planned nuclear reprocessing plant (WAA): nearly the entire German rock elite and 120,000 fans are celebrating together in protest against the facility.

Everyone had to fight their way through police roadblocks, often arriving hours late. Yet they made it, turning the event into the biggest festival in the history of West German rock music. Meanwhile, 6,000 police officers stand wearily by the construction fence, arguing with embittered and outraged citizens.

The film weaves together a multitude of snapshots into a cohesive whole, set to the music of the festival—for it was the music, after all, that managed to counter the arguments of the powers-that-be for those two days.

Attendees explain why they came, musicians express their deep concern, and citizens vent their anger. Yet for two days, everyone unites under a motto proclaimed into the microphone by cabaret artist Helmut Ruge: "And so we say to the gentlemen who hold the money and the nuclear power: Go into your nuclear bunkers... You have the fortress; we have the festival. Let us celebrate."

== Persons and musicians in the film ==
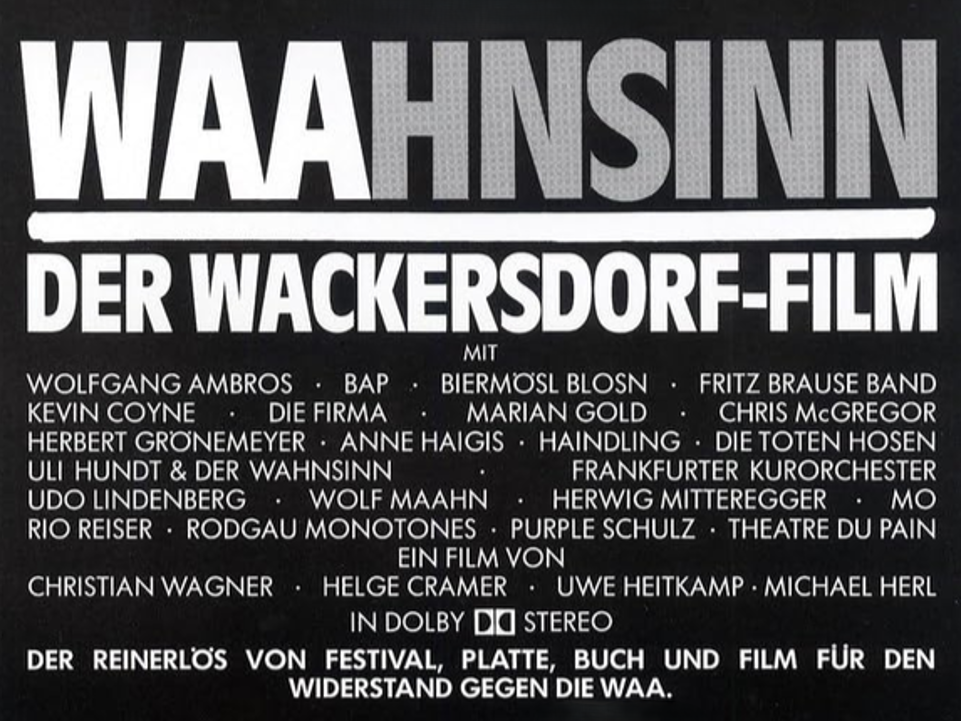
Musicians and bands

Among the performers were BAP, Udo Lindenberg, Wolfgang Niedecken, Rio Reiser, Herbert Grönemeyer, Haindling, Biermösl Blosn, Wolf Maahn, and Die Toten Hosen. Other figures, such as the Austrian politician Freda Meissner-Blau, the cabaret artist Helmut Ruge, the journalist Günter Wallraff, and Pastor Andreas Schlagenhaufer, also appear in the film. The film focuses primarily on the musicians' performances but also explores the surrounding context of the event.

== Production ==
From the outset, the production was designed for collaboration and the simultaneous work of the participating directors. The plan called for Wagner, who was working with Rockpalast at the time, to be responsible for recording the stage show, while journalist Heitkamp initially documented the festival's setup and later filmed the events backstage. Cramer documented the large-scale police operation, gathered footage of the protesters, and handled the editing. The production was shot and edited on U-matic and later transferred to 35mm film for theatrical release.

== Reviews ==
"The film […] shows images of harassing police checks and scenes familiar since Woodstock: festivalgoers in sleeping bags, brushing their teeth in the tent camp in the morning. And the music, too, feels familiar from those distant days. Prominent representatives of the 'German rock' genre, which is anathema to some pop fans but delights many others, are featured. Udo Lindenberg, Wolfgang Niedecken and Bap, Wolf Maahn, and an endless list of German rockers are now performing once again on the big screen. All is forgiven; the end justifies the means." (Der Spiegel 51/1986)

== Awards ==
- Alpinale (Best Socially Critical Film)

== See also ==
- Spaltprozesse, WAA documentary film 1986

== Literature ==
- Mike Allnutt, Michael Herl (Hrsg.): WAAhnsinn: Der Wackersdorf-Film. Die Filmbilder, Lieder, Texte, Reden, Interviews, Dokumente. (WAAhnsinn: The Wackersdorf Film. The film images, songs, texts, speeches, interviews, documents.), Nördlingen 1986, ISBN 3891907508
