= Bayerischer Poetentaler =

Bavarian literary prize

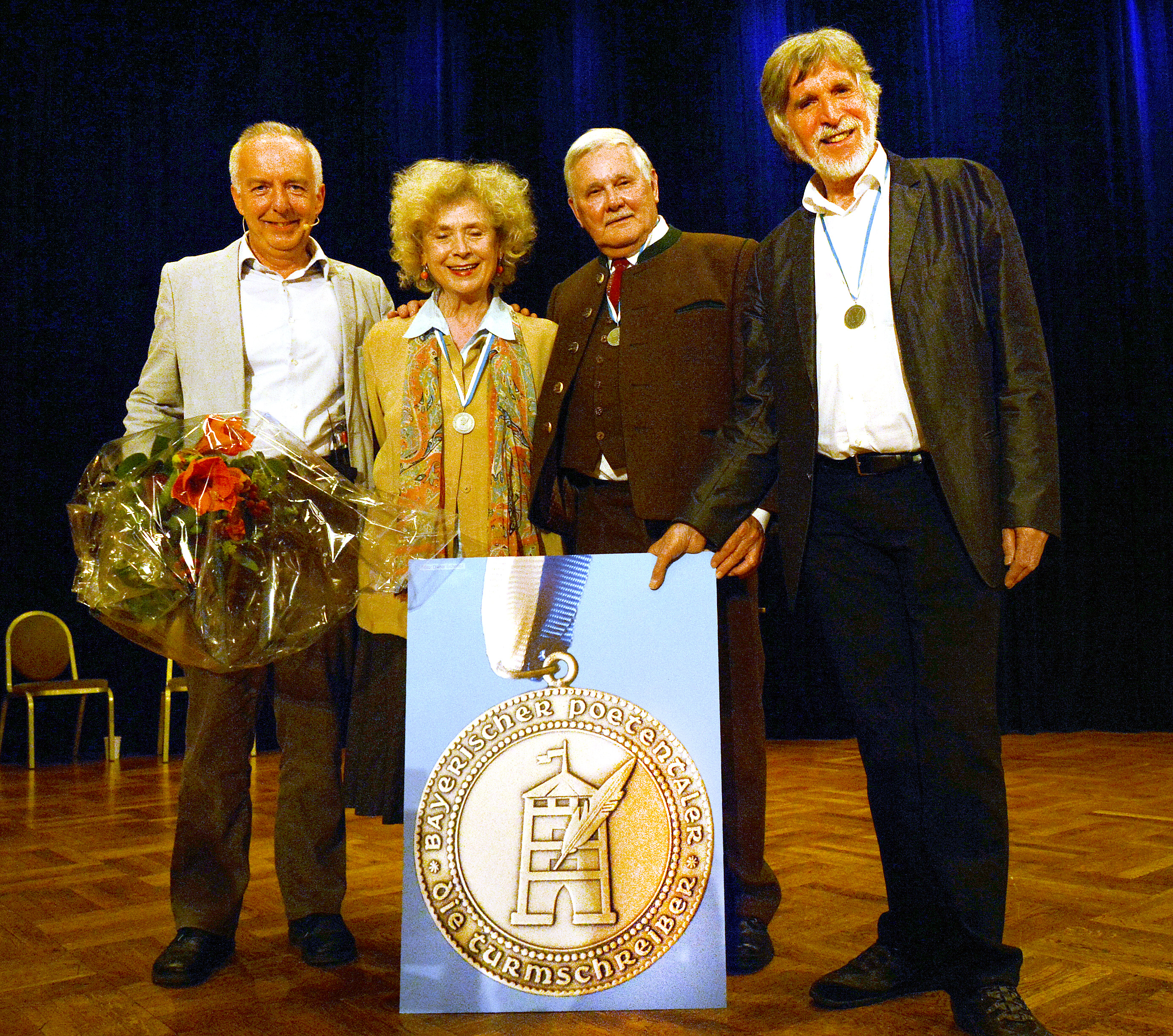
Bayerischer Poetentaler Prize 2013

Bayerischer Poetentaler is a Bavarian literary prize of the writers guild Münchner Turmschreiber.

== Winners ==
=== 1961–1969 ===
- 1961: Joseph Maria Lutz – Eduard Stemplinger – Alfred Weitnauer
- 1962: Benno Hubensteiner – Ernst Hoferichter – Hanns Vogel
- 1963: Hugo Lang – Adolf Roth – Eugen Roth
- 1964: Gustl Feldmeier – Josef Martin Bauer – Alois Fink
- 1965: Richard Billinger – Carl Orff – Erwin Schleich
- 1966: Bernhard Ücker – Ludwig Schrott – Karl Spengler
- 1967: Marieluise Fleißer – Arthur Maximilian Miller – Wugg Retzer
- 1968: Wastl Fanderl – Herbert Schindler – Anton Schnack – Friedrich Schnack
- 1969: Reinhard Raffalt – Rudolf Kriß – Herbert Schneider

=== 1970–1979 ===
- 1970: Hans Bleibrunner – Hans Fitz – Oskar Weber
- 1971: Otto Kraus – Paul Ernst Rattelmüller – Hans Wimmer – Roider Jackl
- 1972: Hannes König – Michl Lang – Georg Lohmeier – Otto Schemm
- 1973: Martin Lankes – Arthur Piechler – Sigi Sommer
- 1974: Annette Thoma – Emil Vierlinger – Werner A. Widmann – Capella Monacensis
- 1975: Eva Vaitl – Wolfgang Johannes Beckh – Paul Friedl (Baumsteftenlenz) – Stefan Schaller
- 1976: Günter Göpfert – Helmut Kirchammer – Michael Schattenhofer – Regensburger Domspatzen
- 1977: Ludwig Hollweg – Robert Münster – Anton Neuhäusler (alias Franz Ringseis) – Kurt Wilhelm
- 1978: Alix du Frenes – Wilhelm Lukas Kristl – Anton Wandinger – Franz Xaver Breitenfellner – die Förderer der Landshuter Hochzeit
- 1979: Werner Egk – Helmut Zöpfl – Georg Blädel – Josef Eberwein

=== 1980–1989 ===
- 1980: Franz von Bayern – Erich Hartstein – Hans Pletzer – Ludwig Schmid-Wildy
- 1981: Augsburger Puppenkiste – Hans Hösl – Ludwig Kusche – Fritz Straßner
- 1982: Gustl Bayrhammer – Franziska Bilek – Alois Weichslgartner – Windsbacher Knabenchor
- 1983: Wilhelm Ludwig – Josef Oberberger – Carl Oskar Renner – Walter Sedlmayr
- 1984: Toni Berger – Fritz Meingast – Gerhard Schmidt-Gaden (Tölzer Knabenchor) – Dieter Wieland
- 1985: Hans Breinlinger – Franz Freisleder – Hans Hotter – Jugend- und Musikkorps Bad Kissingen – Hans Pörnbacher
- 1986: Hans Max von Aufseß – Michael Ende – Wolfgang Sawallisch – Werner Schlierf
- 1987: Leopold Kammerer – Otfried Preußler – Marianne und Heinz Redmann – Karl-Heinz Schickhaus
- 1988: Richard Lemp – Fred Rauch – Frieda Sembach-Krone – Sing- und Musizierkreis Seeon
- 1989: Anton Besold – Alexander von Branca – Harald Dietl – Erni Singerl

=== 1990–1999 ===
- 1990: Leopold Ahlsen – Toni Goth – Franz Kuchler – Willy Purucker – Anna Wimschneider
- 1991: Hans Berger – Walter Flemmer – Heino Hallhuber – Hans Prähofer
- 1992: Ellis Kaut – Ernst Maria Lang – Herbert Rosendorfer – Rolf Alexander Wilhelm
- 1993: Manfred Bacher – Werner und Nannette Bald – Werner Specht – Michael Stiegler
- 1994: Fritz Fenzl – Enoch zu Guttenberg – Otto Meitinger – Hugo Strasser – Reiner Zimnik
- 1995: Ernst Otto Fischer – Kurt Graunke – Odilo Lechner – Alfons Schweiggert
- 1996: Florian Besold – Veronika Fitz – Peter Grassinger – Münchner Orchesterverein Wilde Gungl
- 1997: Sepp Eibl – Hans Fischach – Georg Maier – Rudolf Seitz
- 1998: Augsburger Domsingknaben – Ernst Krammer-Keck – Robert Naegele – Joseph Wahl
- 1999: Armin Eichholz – Fraunhofer Saitenmusik – Klaus Kiermeier – Walter Lindermeier

=== 2000–2009 ===
- 2000: Werner Herzog – Wilfried Hiller – Ernestine Koch – Hans Nöhbauer
- 2001: Ruth Drexel – Josef Steidle – Christian Ude – Sepp Winkler
- 2002: Josef Fendl – Janosch – Christian Neubauer – Ensemble Zapf’nstreich
- 2003: Silke Aichhorn – Margret Hölle – Helmut Seitz – Jutta Speidel
- 2004: Couplet-AG – Jörg Hube – Jutta Makowsky – Winfried Zehetmeier
- 2005: Frank-Markus Barwasser – Hans-Jürgen Buchner – Gert Heidenreich – Erich Jooß – Lotte Roth-Wölfle
- 2006: Hedi Heres – Dieter Hildebrandt – Walter Rupp – Günther Sigl und seine Spider Murphy Gang
- 2007: Martha Schad – Michael Skasa – Notker Wolf
- 2008: Biermösl Blosn – Gerhard Polt – Norbert Göttler – Reinhard Wittmann
- 2009: Monika Baumgartner – Klaus Eberlein – Michael Groißmeier – Konstantin Wecker

=== 2010–2019 ===
- 2010: Franz Eder – Bruno Jonas – Monika Pauderer – Hans Roth
- 2011: Markus Wasmeier – Jo Baier – Helmut Eckl – Münchner Saitentratzer
- 2012: Bayerischer Rundfunk – Michael Lerchenberg – Josef M. Redl – Hardy Scharf
- 2013: Gustl Bauer – Claudia Schlenger and Hanns Meilhamer (Herbert und Schnipsi) – Zither-Manä – Ilse Neubauer
- 2014: Miroslav Nemec – Asta Scheib – Gisela Schneeberger – Traudi Siferlinger – Udo Wachtveitl
- 2015: La Brass Banda – Anton G. Leitner – Marcus H. Rosenmüller – Christian Springer – Brigitte Walbrun
- 2016: Werner Asam – Hans Göttler – Lisa Fitz – Elmar Wepper – Tanngrindler Musikanten
- 2017: Fredl Fesl, Toni Drexler, Fitzgerald Kusz, Produktion "Rosenheim Cops"
- 2018: Michaela May, Andreas Giebel, Friedrich Ani, Bob Ross ("Blechschaden")
- 2019: Maria Peschek, Ludwig Zehetner, Christoph Süß

=== 2020– ===
- 2022: Michaela Karl – Harald Grill – Luise Kinseher – Eisi Gulp
