= Anti-WAAhnsinns Festival =

Anti-WAAhnsinns Festival (Anti-Madness Festival)
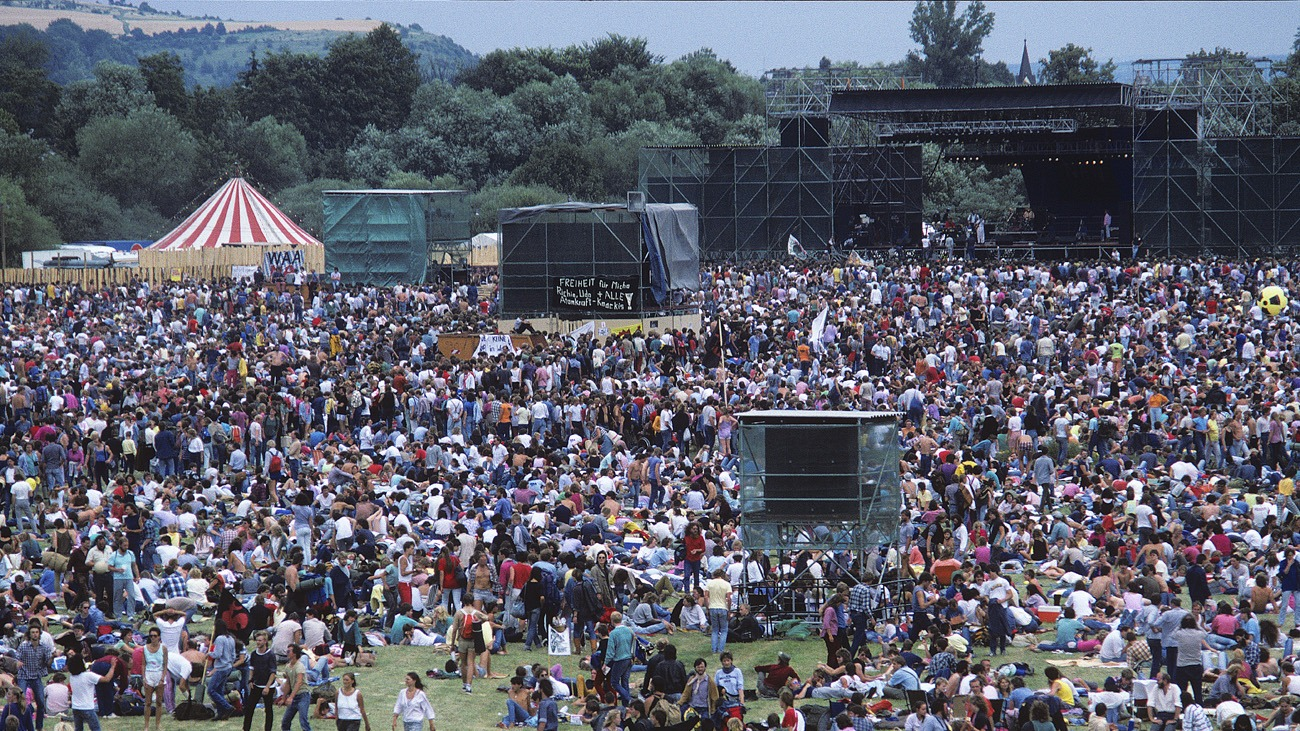
- 5th Anti-WAAhnsinns Festival 1986
- Status: defunct
- Genre: music festivals
- Frequency: Annually
- Location: Burglengenfeld (Bavaria)
- Country: Germany
- Years active: 7
- Inaugurated: August 7, 1982
- Most recent: 16 July 1989

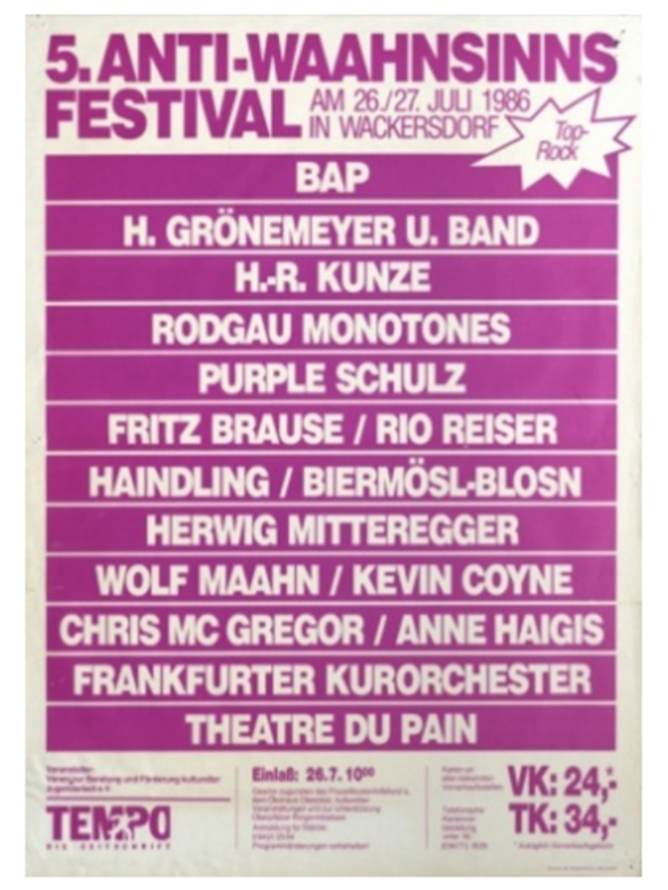
Poster for the 5th Festival

The Anti-WAAhnsinns Festival was a series of political rock concerts in Germany during the 1980s. Its aim was to support protests against the nuclear Wackersdorf reprocessing plant (WAA) in Wackersdorf (Bavaria). In 1986, the fifth festival (also called "German Woodstock") marked the peak of the protest movement against the plant. With over 100,000 people attending on 26 and 27 July, it was the largest rock concert in the history of Germany. The line-up included some of Germany's most popular music acts of the time such as BAP, Die Toten Hosen, Udo Lindenberg, Rio Reiser, Herbert Grönemeyer.

== Beginnings ==
The first Anti-WAAhnsinns Festival took place in 1982 at the Lanzenanger venue in Burglengenfeld. Primary responsibility for the event was held by the local autonomous youth center "Jugendzentrum Burglengenfeld", where many such festivals had taken place before. Between 2,000 and 4,000 people visit the concerts each year. Since many members of the youth center had actively been participating in the resistance against the recycling plant, the management decided to change the original festival into the Anti-WAAhnsinns Festival. The main purpose of the events was to attract public attention to the problems related to the WAA and the protests.

From their engagement in culture-related work, the youth center very quickly managed to come into contact with many Bavarian musicians like Haindling or Biermösl Blosn; who also argued against the building of the recycling plant. While these festivals got more and more positive feedback from the public, the idea began to emerge of encouraging big-name performers, like BAP, Udo Lindenberg, or Herbert Grönemeyer, to take part. Finally, because of the good relations with the management of BAP, the record label EMI Electrola was able to convince their - mostly left-leaning - artists to participate in the festival. In that same year, a live recording of the festival was released as a double LP by this record label. The proceeds of this album were used to support a citizens' initiative against the WAA.

Originally, the organizers intended the Anti-WAAhnsinns Festival to take place in the immediate vicinity of the planned WAA. After excessive protests at Easter and Pentecost the position of both parties got more radical, especially influenced by the catastrophe of Chernobyl. As a result, the Bavarian government set up inviolable precincts up to 120 square kilometers around the construction area. Ultimately, the organizers opted for a field near Burglengenfeld as the venue for the festival. Even before preparation for the festival took place, some city councillors of the Christian Social Union in Bavaria (CSU) and the mayor of Burglengenfeld, Stefan Bawidamann, had already voiced their concern about riots on the fringes of the festival.

Although the Anti-WAAhnsinns-Festival had been officially authorized by the town, the Bavarian Ministry of the Interior and the local government of Upper Palatinate voiced intentions to prohibit the event. An extraordinary meeting of the city council that was scheduled for the 15 July, again voted in favor of the realization of the festival. However, the town's major Bawidamann repealed the ballot, referring to article 19 of the penal law. He considered this necessary in order to prevent danger being brought to the general public, their health, and material goods and to save them from heavy disturbances. The decision about the authorisation of the festival was thereby passed to the subsequent regulating authority, the district office of Schwandorf. Hans Schuierer, the district administrator, validated the decision of the city council and assigned the local government of Oberpfalz (Upper Palatinate) to check the legal force of Bawidamann's decision again.

The motorcycle club Kuhle Wampe took charge of security and entrance. Fields within a radius of several kilometers were rented by the festival's management for parking. In part, the fields had to be harvested directly before the beginning of the festival although the grain was not ripe yet. The number of visitors exceeded expectations and more fields had to be marked as parking spaces on short notice. At one of those rented fields, in particular on the stubble field in the vicinity of Greinhof, a hot catalyzer set off a large-scale fire. A local farmer used a plough to create a firebreak, preventing major damages.

== The festival ==
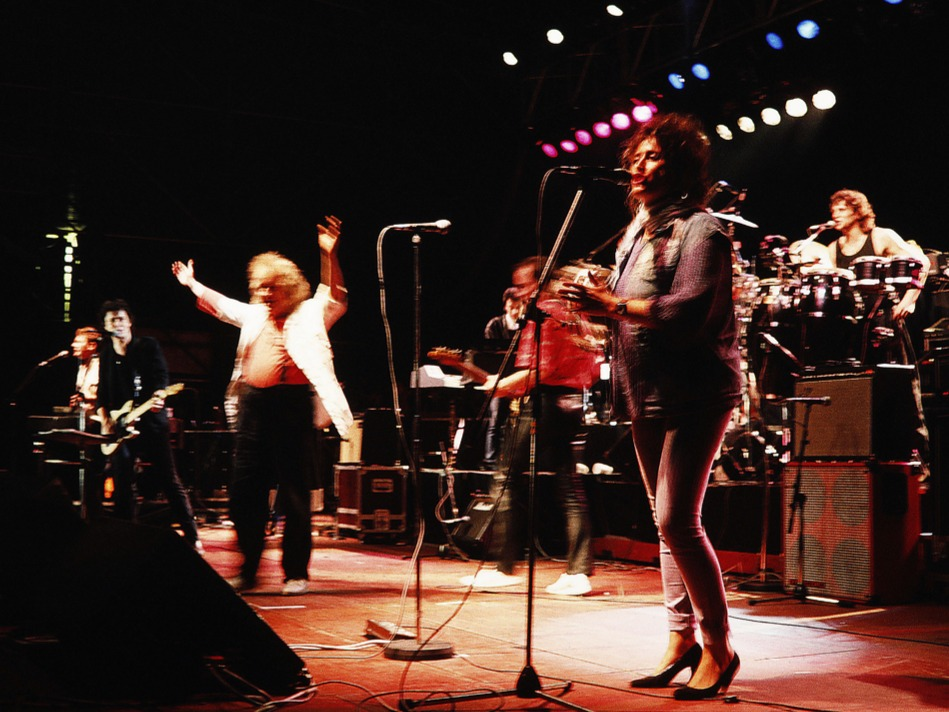
Wolfgang Ambros, Wolfgang Niedecken, Kevin Coyne, Anne Haigis, BAP-Band

Burglengenfeld, a city with about 10,000 inhabitants, was not prepared for the stampede of visitors. Already on the eve of the festival, the supermarkets sold out of all staple food and alcoholic drinks. Several shops closed their doors and did not open them on the following Sunday either. Not having any mobile phones yet, written notes were pinned on all church doors, informing when to meet whom and where. The visitors sought places to sleep in bare brickwork. The inhabitants feared theft, property damage, or even riots, however, these did not transpire.

Accounts about the number of participating visitors at the festival vary. The number is supposed to be over 100,000, which, considering the area, is not entirely unlikely. Musically the Open Air can be revisited on double LP as well as on film.

The festival remained completely peaceful, contrary to government expectations. As a result of the overwhelming protests, the festivals resulted in unexpected media coverage for the anti-nuclear movement in Germany.

== Impact of the festival ==
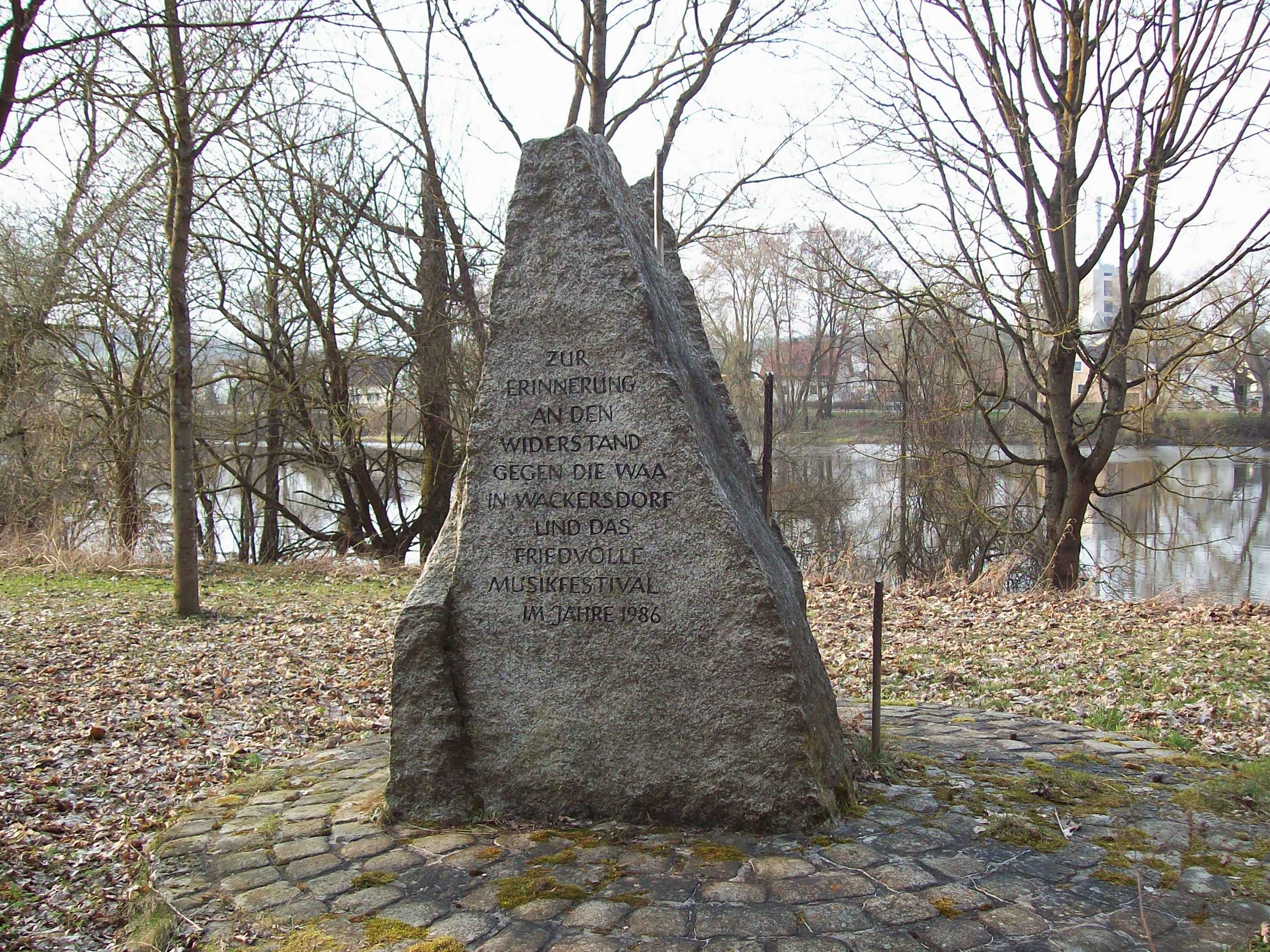
Memorial stone for the 5th festival 1986 in Burglengenfeld Inscription: In remembrance of the resistance against the WAA in Wackersdorf and the peaceful music festival in 1986

Although the 5th Anti-WAAhnsinns Festival (26–27 July 1986), a protest against the nuclear reprocessing plant, proceeded peacefully and without any violence, the state continued fighting it with undiminished rigidity. The opposition to the WAA ended abruptly with the sudden death of Bavaria's minister-president Franz Josef Strauss on 3 October 1988. The operating company DWK and the politicians in the CSU then had diminishing hopes that the WAA project could be realized successfully. On 30 April 1989, Dr. Rudolf von Bennigsen-Foerder, former chairman of the board of VEBA, announced that German energy companies would retreat from reprocessing technology. This came completely unexpected and filled the CSU with bitterness. On 31 May 1989, the DWK specifically froze the construction of the reprocessing plant and had the iron main gate closed symbolically. After the sudden ending for the WAA, the population's resistance diminished as well.

The Anti-WAAhnsinns Festival had 100,000 visitors and a spectrum of musicians who performed for one purpose – the building freeze of the WAA. The festival also showed that there is an opportunity for a counter-public, and a chance to correct and, if necessary, to prevent the decisions of local and federal administrations in a constitutional state. At the same time, the festival suggested the possibility of peaceful protest. Nowadays there is a memorial stone on the former festival site "Lanzenanger" in Burglengenfeld that is to commemorate the Anti-Atom-Festival.

== Film and audio documents ==
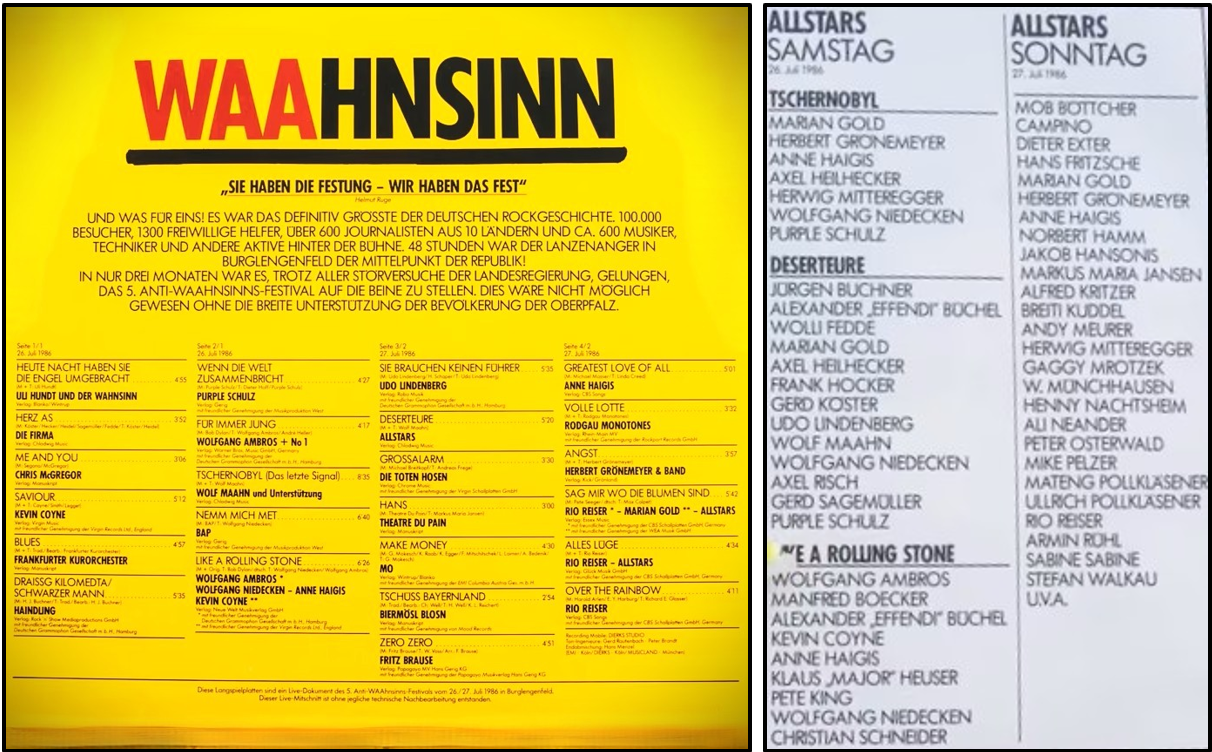
Live music album 1986

- WAAhnsinn – Der Wackersdorf-Film including Die Toten Hosen live at the Anti-WAAhnsinns Festival, 100 min
- Die Toten Hosen at the Anti-WAAhnsinns Festival 1986, 3 min
- Die Toten Hosen (Bis zum bitteren Ende – Die Toten Hosen Live!), Anti-WAAhnsinns Festival 1986, 3 min
- Biermösl Blosn (Tschüss Bayernland - Goodbye Bavarialand) at the Anti-WAAhnsinns Festival 1986, 4 min
- Rio Reiser (Somewhere Over The Rainbow) at the Anti-WAAhnsinns Festival 1986, 4 min
- Rio Reiser - "Alles Lüge" (Rio I.) with BAP & Friends at the Anti-WAAhnsinns Festival 1986, 8 min
- BAP (German band), Wolfgang Niedecken, Kevin Coyne (somewhat drunk), Wolfgang Ambros, Anne Haigis and others (Song: Like a Rolling Stone) at the Anti-WAAhnsinns Festival 1986, 7 min
- Kevin Coyne (The world is full of fools) at the Anti-WAAhnsinns Festival 1986, 2 min
- Anne Haigis at the Anti-WAAhnsinns Festival 1986, 5 min
- Rodgau Monotones (Volle Lotte) at the Anti-WAAhnsinns Festival 1986, 2 min
- Wolf Maahn featuring Marian Gold and others - Tschernobyl (Das letzte Signal) 1986, 7 min
- Tony McPhee and The Groundhogs - live at the Anti-WAAhnsinns Festival 1989, 54 min
- BR24-Zeitreise (time travel): Anti-WAAhnsinnsfestival in Burglengenfeld 1986 - among others with Freda Meissner-Blau and Wolfgang Niedecken, 2 min
- WAAHNSINN (Madness) - The double live LP or double live CD from the 5th WAAhnsinnsfestival, July 26/27, 1986, Burglengenfeld; Musically, the festival was recorded as an unedited live performance on both a double live LP (1986) and a double live CD (2008). The LP was released under the EMI label, with proceeds benefiting citizens' initiatives against the Wackersdorf reprocessing plant. The booklet includes interviews with many artists and also contains Günter Wallraff's speech.

== Literature ==
- Mike Allnutt, Michael Herl (Publisher): WAAhnsinn – Der Wackersdorf-Film. Die Filmbilder, Lieder, Texte, Reden, Interviews, Dokumente, Nördlingen 1986.
- Florian Hoffarth: "You have the fortress, we have the festival." The "Anti-WAAhnsinns-Festival" of 1986 as the culmination of the citizen protests against the reprocessing plant in Wackersdorf, Florian Hoffarth in: Yearbook on Culture and History in the District of Schwandorf 2005/2006, pages 102–123.
