= Margret Hölle =

German writer and poet in dialect

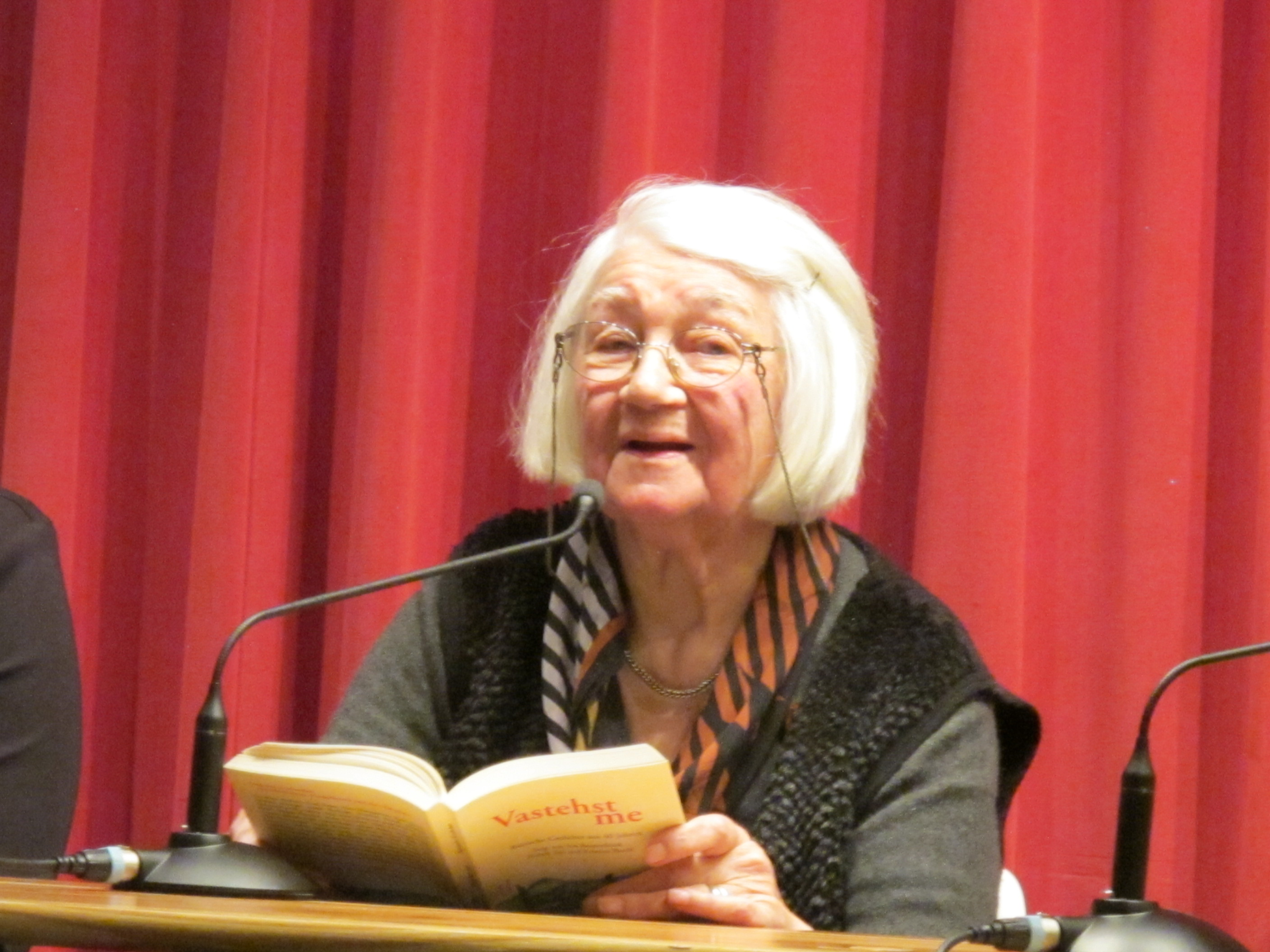
- Born: April 2, 1927; Neumarkt in der Oberpfalz
- Died: October 16, 2023 (aged 96); Munich
- Writing career
- Genre: poetry

Margret Hölle born Margret Sträußl (2 April 1927 – 16 October 2023) was a German poet, playwright and writer who supported the Upper Palatinate dialect. She was awarded the Bayerischer Poetentaler and the Bavarian Order of Merit.

== Life ==
Hölle was born in 1927 in Neumarkt in der Oberpfalz.

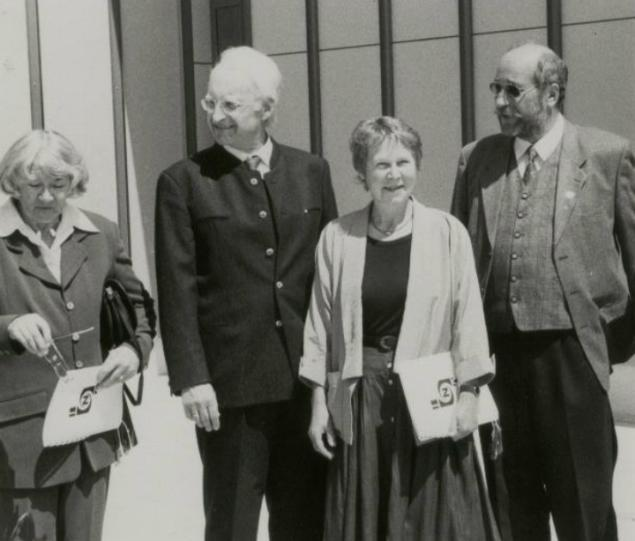
After an award: (L to R) Margret Hölle, Bavarian minister President Edmund Stoiber, Malerin Ruthild Langhammer and Bernhard M. Baron

After the second world war she left her home town to join a traveling theater. She had taken lessons in acting and she later joined the German Drama School in Munich. She gave up drama before she married Erich Hölle. He illustrated books and together they had two children. In the 1950s she began publishing poetry and frequently in the Upper Palatinate dialect. Her work was creditted with making the dialect more well known. She felt that the dialect had been corrupted and she researched its history to recover old words. Despite the archaic words she managed to make her poems sound contemporary. She wrote a tribute poem to the poet Johann Andreas Schmeller who had also tried to revitalise the same dialect. She would read her poems on Bavarian radio programmes and assist the listeners with understanding the dialect. She knew that her poetry was very difficult to understand to those from outside Bavaria.

In 1990 she won Neumarkt culture prize. In 2003 she was one of four honoured with the Bavarian literary prize Bayerischer Poetentaler. The others were Silke Aichhorn, Helmut Seitz and Jutta Speidel. The Bayerischer Poetentaler is given by the Münchner Turmschreiber writers guild. On October 10, 2012, she was awarded the Bavarian Order of Merit.

Hölle died in Munich in 2023 at the age of 96.

== Publications ==
Her first published poetry collection was in 1976. Her second small collection, "Iwa Jauha und Dooch" was published in 1981. Both of these were in her preferred dialect. In 1988 her self published poetry book in the common German language "On the Way" appeared. In 1996 her book of dialect poetry, "Wurzelherz", appeared.
