= Luise Kinseher =

German actress (born 1969)

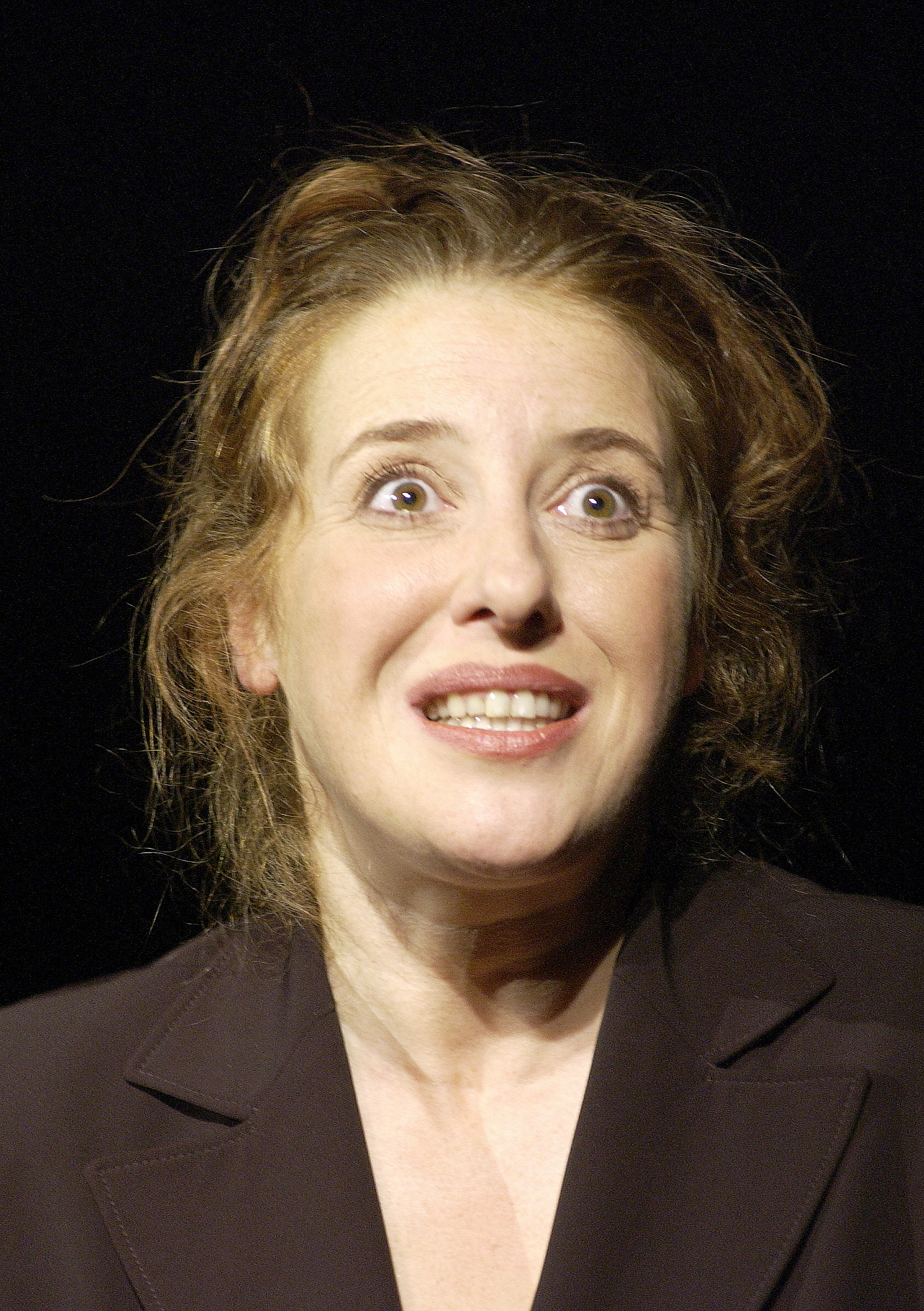
- Kinseher in 2006
- Born: 4 January 1969 (age 57); Geiselhöring, Bavaria, West Germany
- Occupations: Cabaret artist and actress
- Website: https://www.luise-kinseher.de/

Luise Kinseher (born 4 January 1969 in Geiselhöring) is a German cabaret artist and actress.

== Life ==
Luise Kinseher, who was raised in the Lower Bavarian city of Geiselhöring, studied German philology, dramatics, and history in Munich. She wrote her Master's thesis about Sigi Zimmerschied and gained first stage experience as a cabaret actress in 1992. From 1993 to 1998 she was an ensemble member of the Iberl Bühne in Munich-Solln, where she worked with Georg Maier and performed in more than 800 shows.

In 1998 she showcased her first solo programme Ende der Ausbaustrecke - Silent Thrill of Kabarett.

Director Franz Xaver Bogner discovered Kinseher as a Bavarian actress and cast her for his TV shows in key roles, for example as Hanna Graf in Café Meineid and as police station manager Thekla Eichenseher in München 7. She was also shown in cinemas in Vorne ist verdammt weit weg and Marcus H. Rosenmüller's Good Times. As personal assistant Gabi Blümel she regularly reviews the cabaret weekly review of the Bavarian Television programme Nix für ungut. In 2010, she played the role of the Bavaria for the first time in the singspiel of the traditional politician Derblecken on the Nockherberg. She was the first woman ever to hold the Salvator speech in this role in 2011. From 2012 to 2018 she represented Mama Bavaria on the Nockherberg.

Her stage programme Einfach reich celebrated its premier in 2010 in Munich's Lach- und Schießgesellschaft.

Luise Kinseher lives in Munich.

== Solo programmes ==
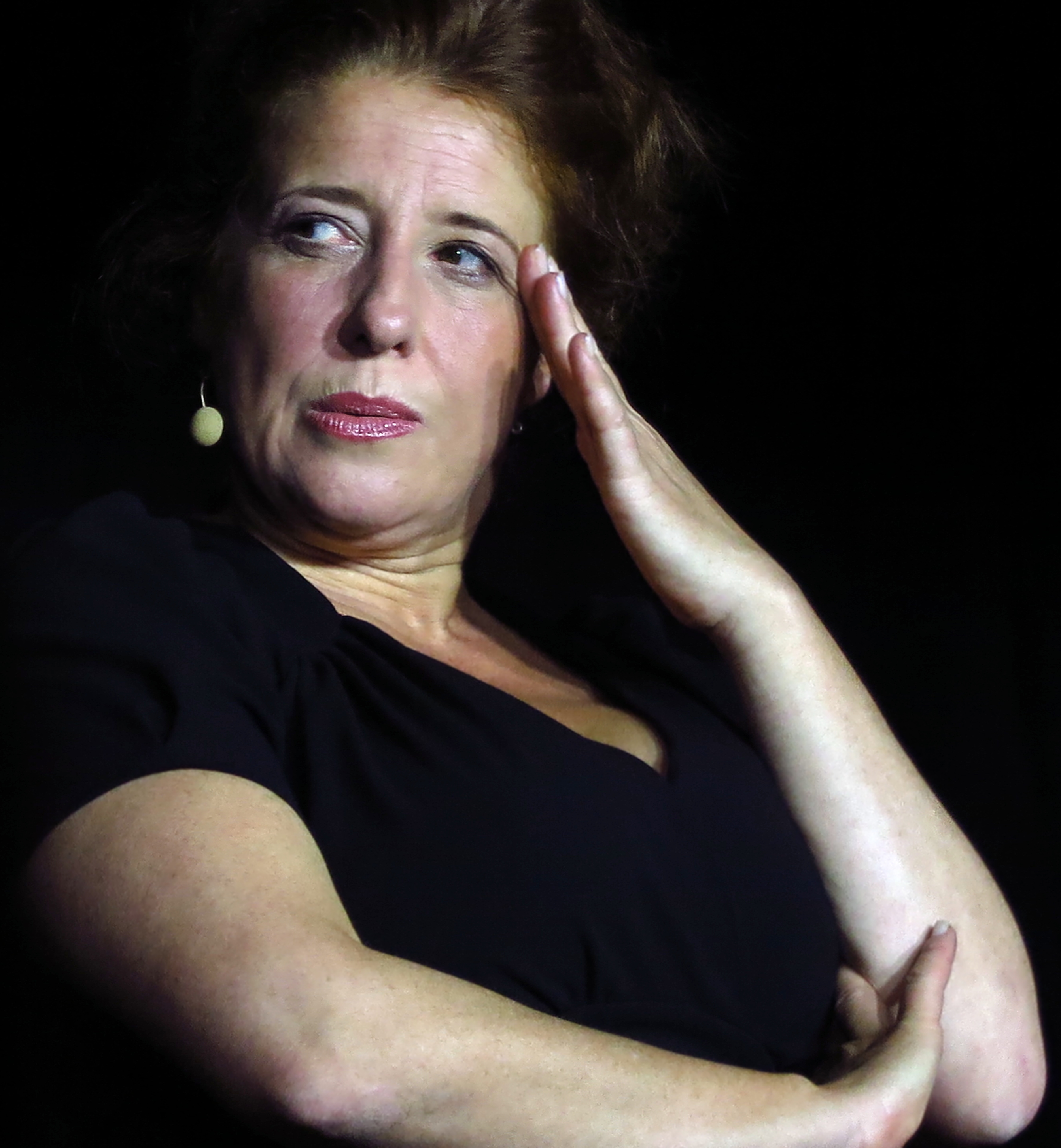
Autumn 2014

- 1998: Ende der Ausbaustrecke - Silent Thrill of Kabarett
- 2001: Schnop - der Weg ist weg
- 2004: Glück & Co
- 2007: Hotel Freiheit
- 2010: Einfach reich
- 2014: Ruhe bewahren

== Discography ==
- Schnop - Der Weg ist Weg, WortArt Köln 2002, ISBN 978-3-7857-1299-3
- Glück & Co, WortArt Köln, 2005, ISBN 978-3-7857-3028-7
- Hotel Freiheit, WortArt Köln, 2008, ISBN 978-3-86604-937-6
- Einfach reich, WortArt Köln, 2011, ISBN 978-3-8371-0953-5

== Filmography ==
- 1996–1998: Anwalt Abel (2 episodes)
- 1996: Tatort: Schattenwelt
- 1999: SOKO 5113: Das Doppelleben des Werner Eck
- 2000–2003: Café Meineid (42 episodes)
- 2000: Einmal leben
- 2001: Alle meine Töchter: Der Bumerang-Effekt
- 2001: Jenny & Co.: Kinder, Kinder
- since 2004: München 7 (36 episodes)
- 2006: Die Rosenheim-Cops: Tod eines Ekels
- 2007: Das große Hobeditzn
- 2007: Good Times
- 2007: Vorne ist verdammt weit weg
- 2010: Die Rosenheim-Cops: Späte Rache
- 2010: Nix für ungut! (4 Episoden)
- 2010–2013: Auf dem Nockherberg (4 episodes)
- 2011: Intensiv-Station – Die NDR Satireshow
- 2011–2012: Ottis Schlachthof (2 episodes)
- 2015: Die Anstalt (one episode, 20 October 2015)
- 2017: Teenosaurus Rex

== Awards ==
- 1999: Passauer Scharfrichterbeil
- 2002: Mindener Stichling, Solo prize
- 2002: Deutscher Kleinkunstpreis, Sponsorship prize
- 2003: Kabarettpreis der Landeshauptstadt München
- 2012: Bairische Sprachwurzel, Straubing
- 2013: Ernst-Hoferichter-Preis of the capital city Munich
- 2014: Bayerischer Kabarettpreis, Main prize
