= Paul Kuhn (band leader) =

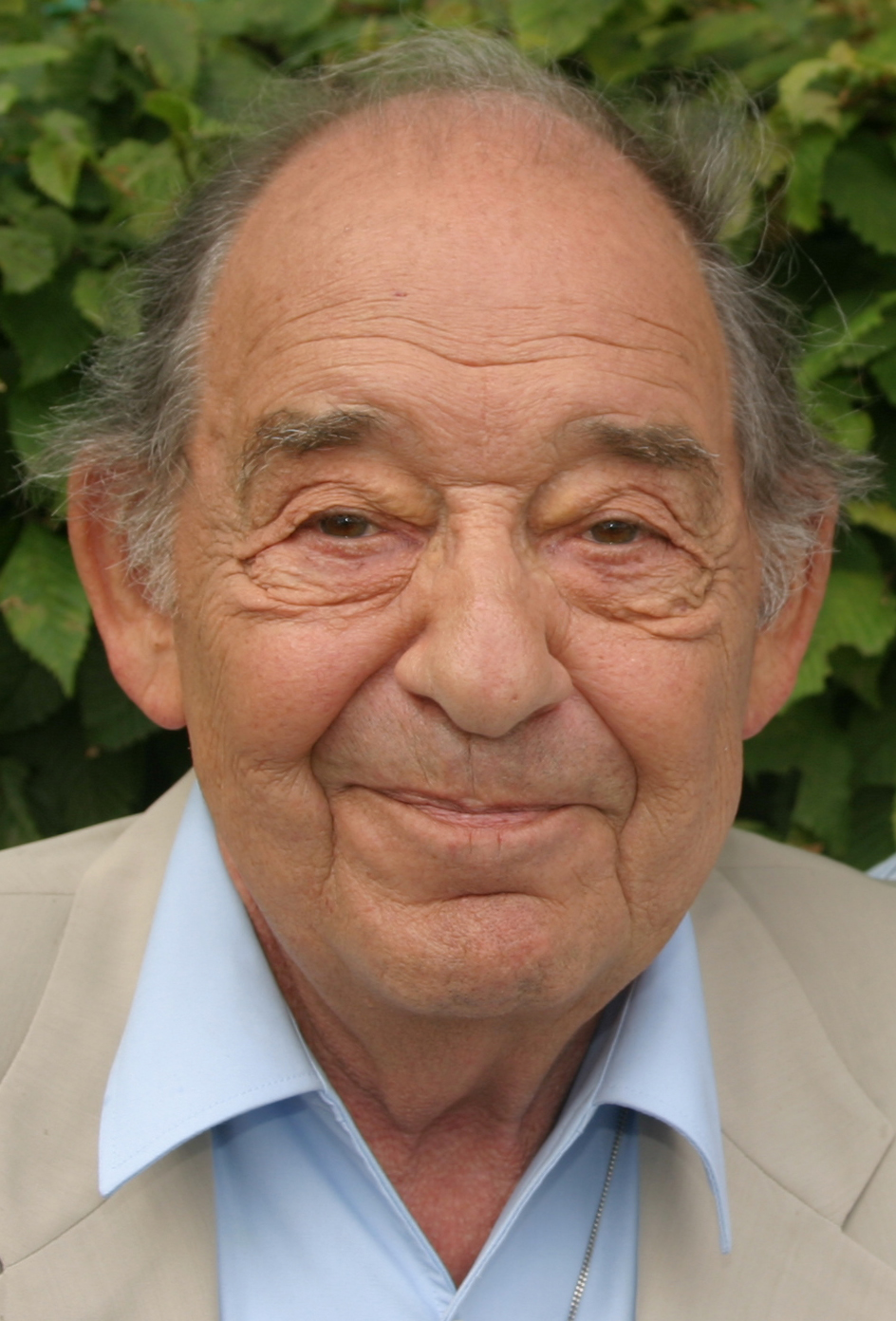
- Paul Kuhn (2005)

Background information
- Occupation: Musician
- Labels: Columbia, Dansan Records, Discoton, EMI Electrola, HÖR ZU, In+Out Records

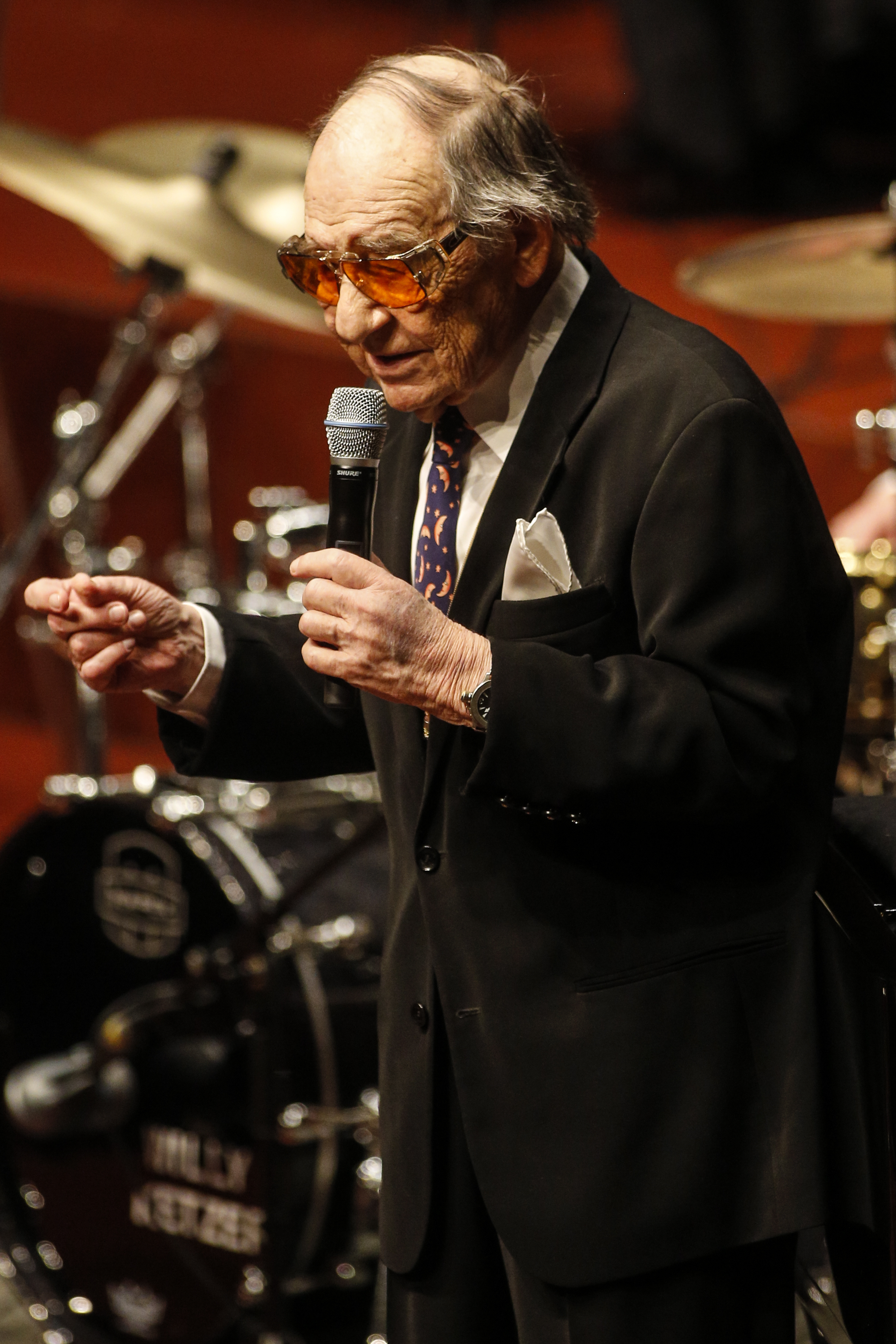
Paul Kuhn on stage (2013)

Paul Kuhn (12 March 1928 – 23 September 2013) was a German jazz musician, band leader, singer and pianist. He was the band leader of the SFB Big Band, the orchestra of the Sender Freies Berlin, the TV-Station of West Berlin, part of ARD. He was the conductor of the German entry in the 1972 Eurovision Song Contest.

== Life ==
Kuhn was born the son of a croupier in Wiesbaden. In 1936, at the age of 8, he had a public gig at the 'Funkausstellung' in Berlin, playing the accordion. Some years later, he discovered jazz music (which was frowned upon during the Nazi years, 1933–1945). In 1944, he was in Paris and had some gigs to entertain soldiers of the Wehrmacht, who still occupied Paris.

After V-Day (8 May 1945), the American Forces formed an occupation zone in parts of Germany, amongst them the region around Frankfurt. Kuhn was hired by AFN (American Forces Network), he was live on radio almost every day, alone or with his band. He adopted the style and sound of Glenn Miller.

In the 1950s, he arranged and composed entertainment music. Around 1955, he increasingly launched pop songs, sung and played by himself. During the 1960s, more and more west German households bought a TV; music shows, big bands and singers were very successful. In 1968, Kuhn was named head of the entertainment orchestra of Sender Freies Berlin.

In 1980, this band was dissolved and Kuhn moved to Cologne and founded his own orchestra.

Starting in 2000, he toured with Max Greger, Hugo Strasser and the Big Band of SWR (Südwestdeutscher Rundfunk).

At the end of 2011, Kuhn travelled to San Francisco to record a CD (The L.A. Session, with John Clayton and Jeff Hamilton). The album was released in 2013.

His most known hits were "Der Mann am Klavier" (1954), "Es gibt kein Bier auf Hawaii" (1963) and "Die Farbe der Liebe" (1958 in the charts).
