= Gerhard Schmidt-Gaden =

German conductor and choir director (1937–2026)

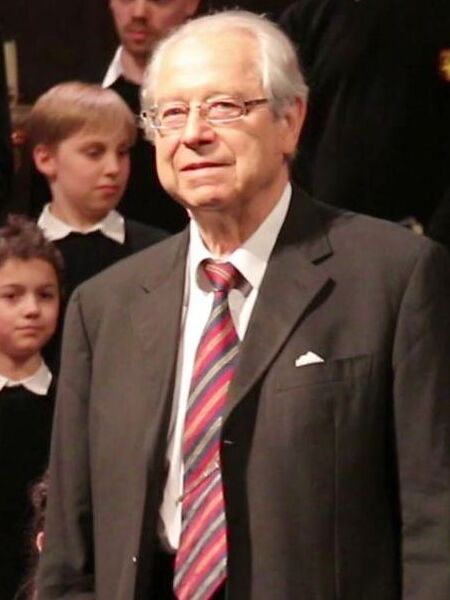
- Schmidt-Gaden in 2018
- Born: 19 June 1937; Karlovy Vary, Czechoslovakia
- Died: 19 April 2026 (aged 88); Benediktbeuern, Bavaria, Germany
- Occupations: Conductor; Choral conductor; Academic teacher
- Organizations: Tölzer Knabenchor; Florilegium Musicum; Mozarteum
- Awards: Order of Merit of the Federal Republic of Germany; Bayerischer Verdienstorden; Echo Klassik; Bayerische Verfassungsmedaille

Gerhard Schmidt-Gaden (19 June 1937 – 19 April 2026) was a German conductor, especially a choral conductor, and an academic teacher. He founded and conducted the Tölzer Knabenchor in 1956, leading the boys' choir to international fame. They participated in Nikolaus Harnoncourt's pioneering recordings of Johann Sebastian Bach's choral music in historically informed performances. He retired from the position in 2016.

== Life and career ==
Gerhard Schmidt-Gaden was born in Karlovy Vary, Czechoslovakia, on 19 June 1937. As a boy, he sang soprano in the church's boys' choir and in other choirs of the region, and he took organ lessons from the choral conductor. He studied conducting with Kurt Eichhorn at the Musikhochschule München, choral conducting with Kurt Thomas in Leipzig, and singing with Helge Rosvaenge, Otto Iro and Mario Tonelli.

In 1956, at age 18 and still at school, he founded the Tölzer Knabenchor with members from a boy scout group. The choir was first called "Singkreis Bad Tölz im Kreisjugendring". He took the boys' choir to the Bavarian broadcaster BR and to Leipzig to a competition for choral conductors. The group was named Tölzer Knabenchor the following year. They achieved international fame within a few years. Schmidt-Gaden collaborated with Hans Werner Henze, Herbert von Karajan, and Claudio Abbado. The choir performed in a prologue to the world premiere of Carl Orff's De temporum fine comoedia at the Salzburg Festival, staged by August Everding in 1973.

During his studies in Leipzig, Schmidt-Gaden became interested in historically informed performance, using boys' choirs for Baroque music as the composers had in mind. This led to a longstanding collaboration with Nikolaus Harnoncourt, with the Tölzer Knabenchor performing in Harnoncourt's first recordings of Bach's works in historically informed performance, including around 100 Bach cantatas. A recording is Bach's Weihnachtsoratorium in Waldhausen church. He toured with the boys to the US, China and Japan, among others. In 1978, Schmidt-Gaden founded the Florilegium Musicum, a chamber orchestra for early music with original instruments.

From 1980 to 1988 he was professor of choral conducting at the Mozarteum in Salzburg. From 1984 to 1989 he also worked as director of the boys' choir at La Scala in Milan.

The writer Christopher Kloeble, who sang in the Tölzer Knabenchor from 1988 to 1994, reported in 2017 retrospectively about mental abuse by Schmidt-Gaden such as the singing of a song mocking the then overweight Kloeble during a bus ride of the choir. Another choirboy confirmed the atmosphere of fear, humiliation and emotional violence including being slapped in the face. Schmidt-Gaden did not comment on the accusations.

Schmidt-Gaden's recordings with the Tölzer Knabenchor include Bach's Christmas Oratorio with the Collegium Aureum, Kleine Geistliche Konzerte by Heinrich Schütz, and sacred choral music by Orlando di Lasso. A reviewer of Gramophone noted about their 1971 recording of the Christmas Oratorio that it "bursts forth with spirited expectation as the Nativity is vigorously explored".

In his last concert with the Tölzer Knabenchor he performed four motets by Bach at the Stadtpfarrkirche in Bad Tölz in January 2016, opening the year of celebrating the choir's 60th anniversary. He was succeeded by his pupil Christian Fliegner.

=== Personal life ===
Schmidt-Gaden was married to Helga Schmidt-Gaden; the couple had a daughter, Barbara Schmidt-Gaden, who took over the choir's management in 2015.

Schmidt-Gaden died in Benediktbeuern on 19 April 2026 after a long illness, at the age of 88.

== Awards ==
- 1983: Order of Merit of the Federal Republic of Germany
- 1984: Bayerischer Poetentaler
- 1991: Oberbayerischer Kulturpreis
- 1994: Bayerischer Verdienstorden
- 2003: Echo Music Prize Classic for the recording of Bußpsalmen by Orlando di Lasso
- 2009: Bayerische Verfassungsmedaille in silver

== Publications ==
- Gerhard Schmidt-Gaden: Wege der Stimmbildung. Max Hieber Musikverlag, Munich 1992, ISBN 3-920456-11-4
