= Geiselhöring =

- Town
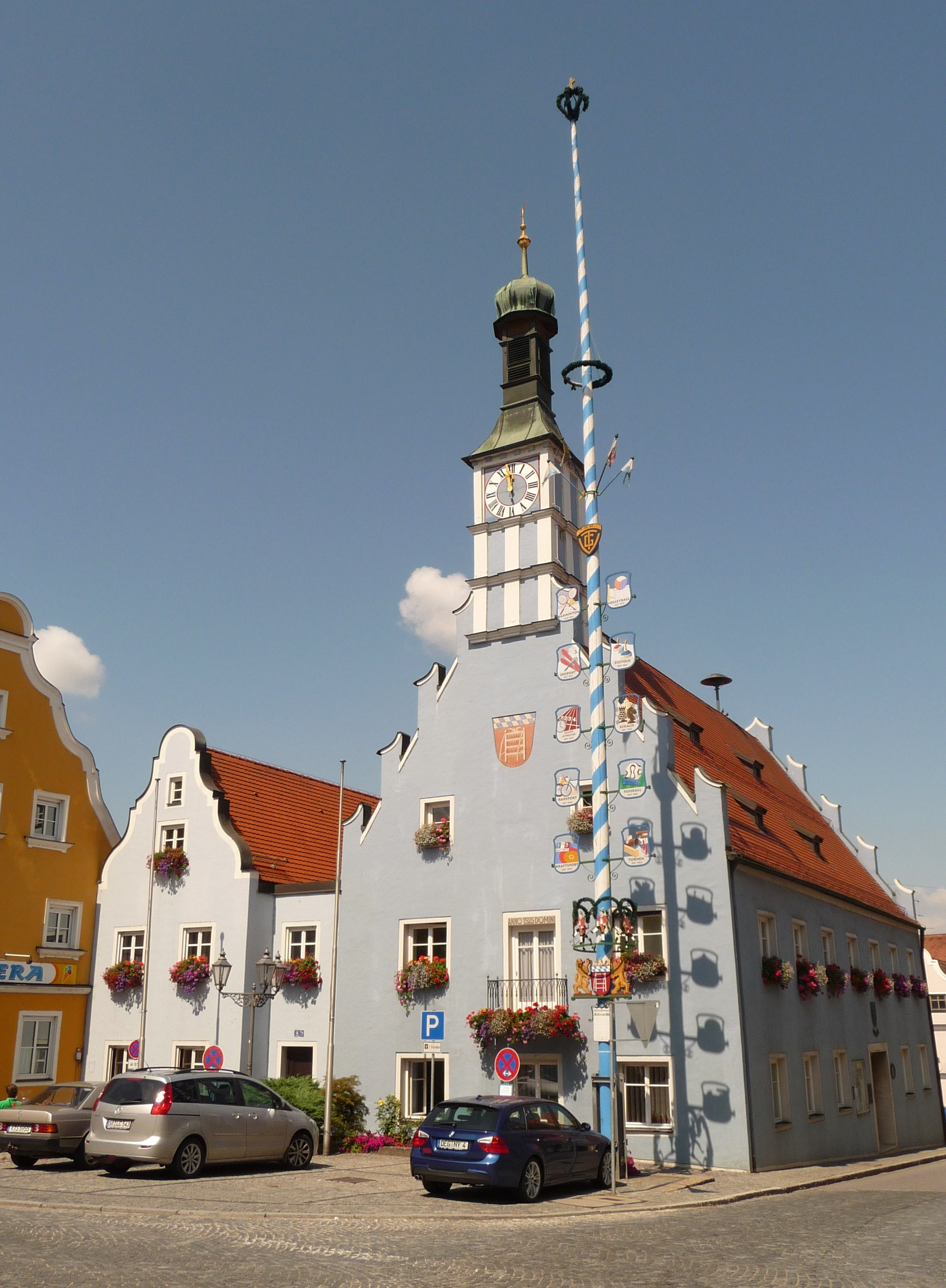
- Town hall

- Coat of arms

- Location of Geiselhöring within Straubing-Bogen district
- Interactive map of Geiselhöring
- Location within Germany Location within Bavaria
- Coordinates: 48°49′33″N 12°23′33″E
- Country: Germany
- State: Bavaria
- Admin. region: Niederbayern
- District: Straubing-Bogen

Government
  - Mayor (2020–26): Herbert Lichtinger (CSU)

Area
  - Total: 99.69 km^{2} (38.49 sq mi)
- Elevation: 356 m (1,168 ft)

Population (2025-12-31)
  - Total: 6,954
  - Density: 69.76/km^{2} (180.7/sq mi)
- Time zone: UTC+01:00 (CET)
  - Summer (DST): UTC+02:00 (CEST)
- Postal codes: 94333
- Dialling codes: 09423
- Vehicle registration: SR
- Website: Stadt Geiselhöring

Geiselhöring (German pronunciation: [ɡaɪzl̩ˈhøːʁɪŋ]) is a town in the Straubing-Bogen district, in Bavaria, Germany. It is situated 14 km southwest of Straubing, and 30 km southeast of Regensburg.

== Personalities ==
The following personalities come from Geiselhöring and / or have / had to deal with Geiselhöring:

- Hans-Jürgen Buchner (born 1944) named his music group Haindling after the district of the same name
- Elli Erl (born 1979), winner of Germany is looking for the superstar 2003
- Luise Kinseher (born 1969), cabaret artist and actress, grew up in Geiselhöring
- Heinrich Weber (1940-2010), tenor
