= Georg Maier =

German actor (1941–2021)

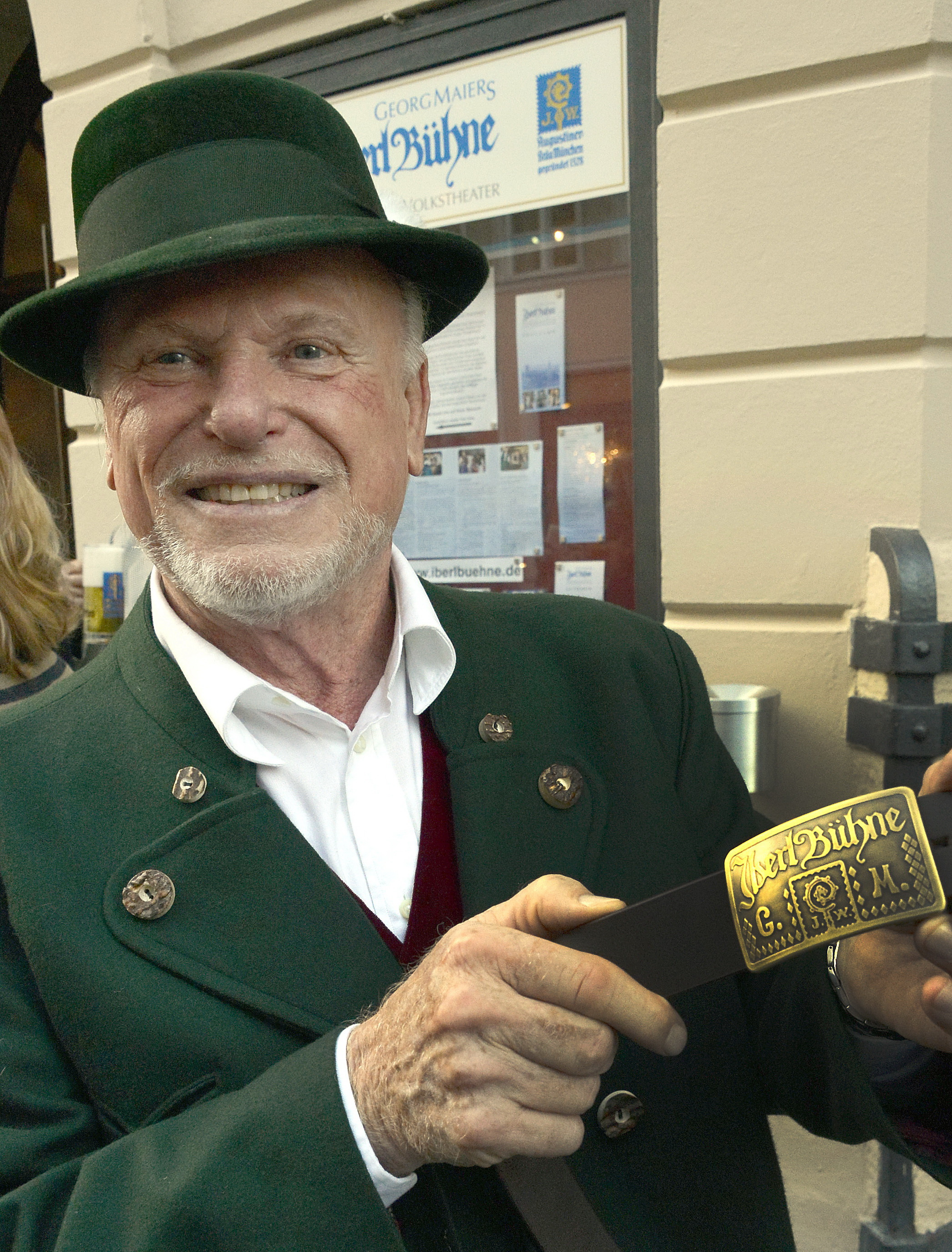
- Georg Maier
- Born: 27 September 1941; Grünwald, Nazi Germany
- Died: 1 January 2021 (aged 79); Munich, Germany
- Occupations: Actor; Theatre Director

Georg Maier (27 September 1941 – 1 January 2021) was a German actor and theatre director.

== Biography ==
Maier's father was one of the tenants of Gasthaus zur Hundskugel, an old inn in Munich which existed until 2011. In 1966, Georg became director of the Iberl-Bühne, a theatre in Munich which exhibited folk plays in the Bavarian language.

== Awards ==
- Medaille München leuchtet (1996)
- Bayerischer Poetentaler (1997)
- Order of Merit of the Federal Republic of Germany (2001)
- Ernst-Hoferichter-Preis (2002)

== Filmography ==
- Familie Meier (1983)
- Irgendwie und Sowieso (1986)
- Hindafing (2016)
