= Hugo Strasser =

German composer, clarinetist and bandleader

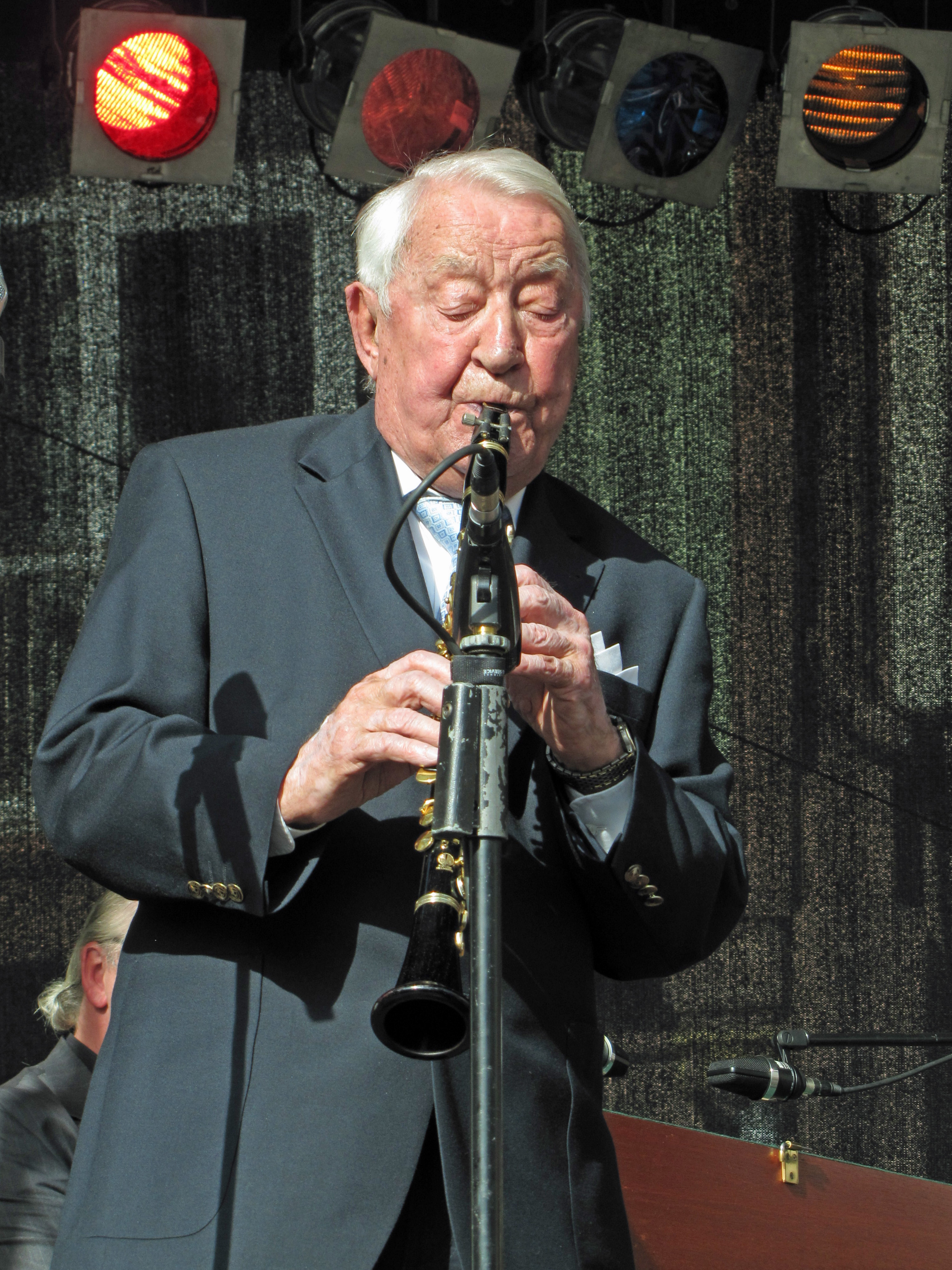
- Strasser in 2013

Background information
- Born: April 17, 1922; Munich-Schwabing
- Died: March 17, 2016 (aged 93)
- Labels: Columbia, Dansan Records, EMI Electrola, Karussell

Hugo Strasser (April 7, 1922, Munich-Schwabing - March 17, 2016, Munich-Trudering) was a German swing and jazz musician, composer, clarinetist and big band leader of the Orchester Hugo Strasser (Hugo Strasser Orchestra) since 1955. The orchestra was famous for its dance music, in particular music for suited ballroom dancing with its strict beat and tempo, played at numerous ballroom dance / Dancesport championships in Germany and abroad.

Of note is Strasser's series of recordings "Tanzplatte des Jahres" ( "Dance Record of the Year" ).

== Selected discography ==
- Schicke Tanzmusik (1962/63); Modetänze wie Letkiss und Madison)
- Turniertanz-Trümpfe (1963)
- Die Tanzplatte des Jahres (30 items; 1966 bis 1996; since 1982 as digital records, since 1984 also as CD)
- Das Goldene Tanzalbum 1–4 (1967–1968; Part 1: Valencia – Die Goldenen 20er Jahre; Part 2: In the Mood – Melodie und Rhythmus; Part 3: Warum müssen Jahre vergehen – ewig junge Filmschlager; Part 4: Yesterday – Vom Twist zum Beat)
- Das Goldene Hausparty-Album 1–3 (1968)
- Mit Hugo Strasser im 3/4-Takt (1968)
- Tanzweltmeisterschaft 1970 (1970)
- Filmhits zum Tanzen (1970)
- Tanztest-Platte (1971/72)
- Tanzhits ’71 (1972) beat and rock hits
- Romantic Party (1972)
- Olympia-Ball (1972); tracks composed for the 1972 Winter Sapporo and Summer Munich Olympic games
- Swinging Christmas (1973, popular Christmas carols)
- The Dancing Clarinet (1973; Traditional music from around the world in strict tempo)
- Der Goldene Tanzschuh (1974; Opera melodies for dancing)
- Der Goldene Tanzschuh (1986; Music from the ZDF program with the same name)
- Was ich sagen wollte… (1989; Hugo Strasser sings)
- Tanz! Tanz! Tanz! (1990; Peter Kreuder's melodies)
- ARD Masters Gala ’92 (1992)
- So What’s New? Single with Matthias Matuschik and the Bananafishbones (2001)

== Filmography ==
- 1958: Zwei Matrosen auf der Alm, music
- 1961: Dangeorus Journey, music
- 1962: Sfida nella città dell'oro, music
- 1965: A Girl from the Bohemian Forest, music

== Awards ==
- 2012: Bavarian Order of Merit
- 2002: Schwabing Art Prize
- 1994: Bayerischer Poetentaler

== See also ==
- Max Greger
- James Last
- Paul Kuhn
