= Burglengenfeld =

- Town
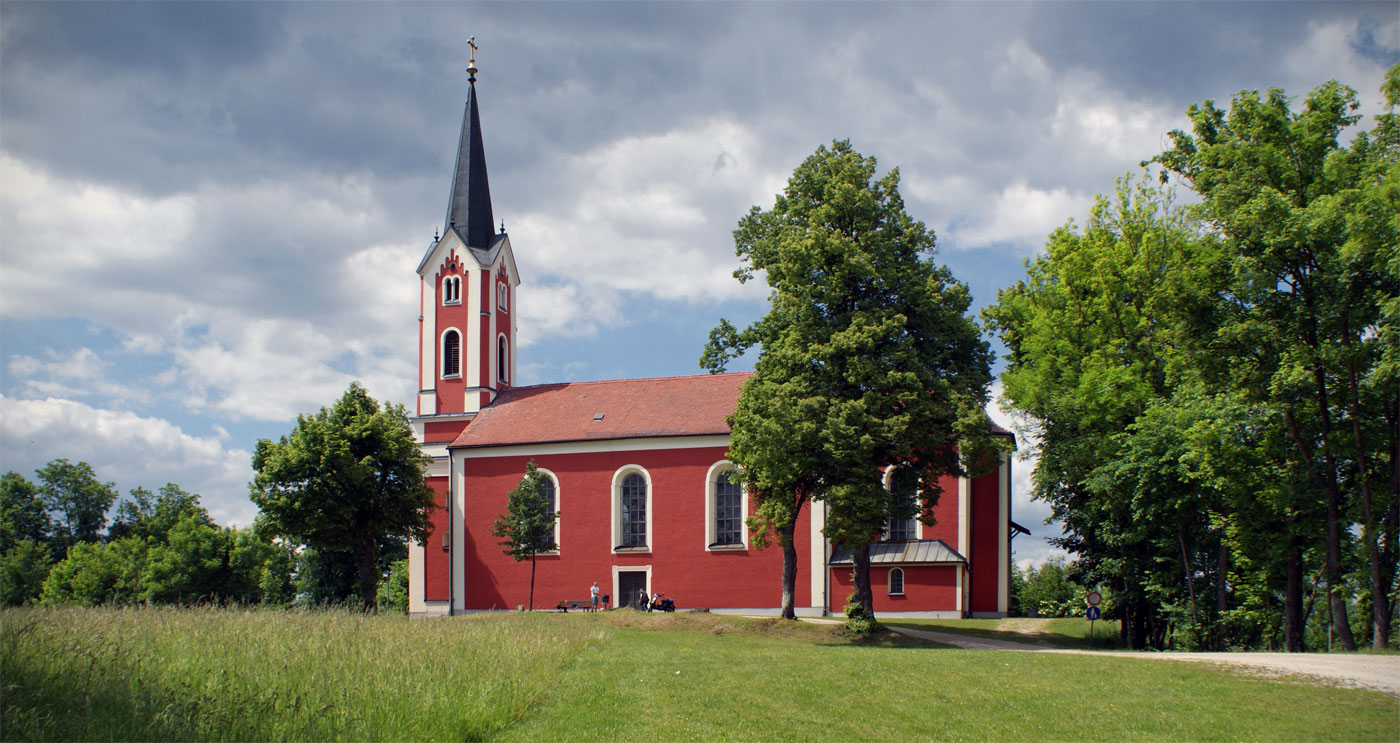
- Kreuzbergkirche in Burglengenfeld

- Coat of arms

- Location of Burglengenfeld within Schwandorf district
- Interactive map of Burglengenfeld
- Location within Germany Location within Bavaria
- Coordinates: 49°12′N 12°2′E
- Country: Germany
- State: Bavaria
- Admin. region: Oberpfalz
- District: Schwandorf
- Subdivisions: 4 Stadtteile

Government
  - Mayor (2020–26): Thomas Gesche (CSU)

Area
  - Total: 93.26 km^{2} (36.01 sq mi)
- Elevation: 355 m (1,165 ft)

Population (2025-12-31)
  - Total: 14,681
  - Density: 157.4/km^{2} (407.7/sq mi)
- Time zone: UTC+01:00 (CET)
  - Summer (DST): UTC+02:00 (CEST)
- Postal codes: 93133
- Dialling codes: 0 94 71
- Vehicle registration: SAD, BUL, NAB, NEN, OVI, ROD
- Website: www.burglengenfeld.de

Burglengenfeld (German pronunciation: [bʊʁkˈlɛŋənfɛlt]) is a town in the district of Schwandorf, in Bavaria, Germany. It is situated on the river Naab, 22 km north of Regensburg.

== Climate ==
Climate in this area has mild differences between highs and lows, and there is adequate rainfall year-round. The Köppen Climate Classification subtype for this climate is "Cfb". (Marine West Coast Climate/Oceanic climate).

== Anti-WAAhnsinns-Festival ==
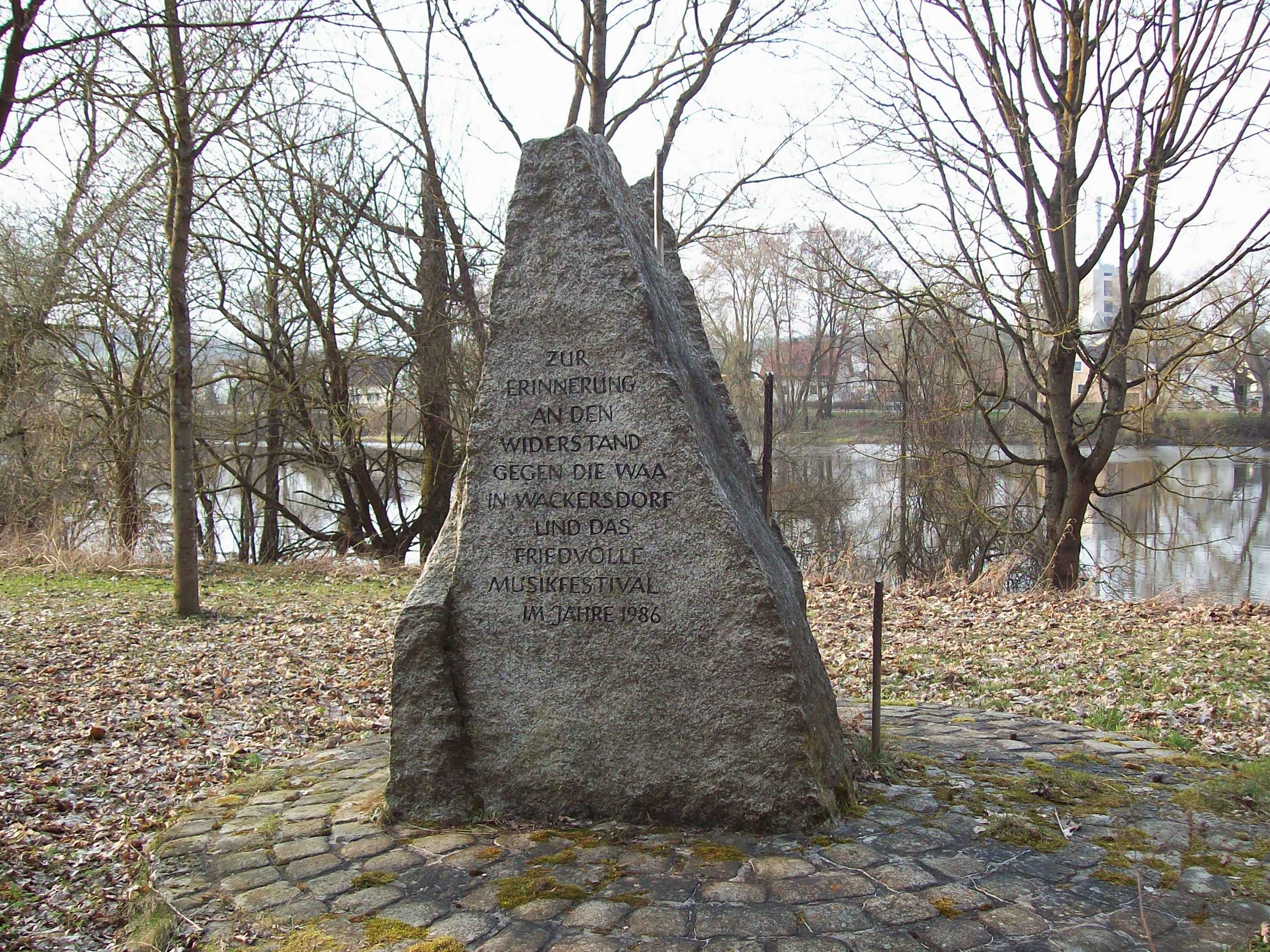
1986 Anti-WAAhnsinns-Festival memorial stone in Burglengenfeld

The Anti-WAAhnsinns Festivals in Burglengenfeld were political rock concerts, which took place in Germany in the 1980s. Their purpose was to support protests against a planned nuclear reprocessing plant Wackersdorf (German: Wiederaufbereitungsanlage Wackersdorf, abbreviated WAA Wackersdorf) in Wackersdorf.

== Personalities ==
- Louis IV, Holy Roman Emperor (1281 or 1282–1347), Emperor of the Holy Roman Empire, lived around 1300 for about two years in the castle
- Johann Michael Fischer (1692–1766), baroque master builder
- Carl Ludwig Koch (1778–1857), forester, entomologist and arachnologist
