= Helmut Ruge =

German comedian, actor, writer (1940–2014)

Helmut Ruge (7 February 1940 – 8 October 2014) was a German comedian, author, director and actor. He was born in Stuttgart.

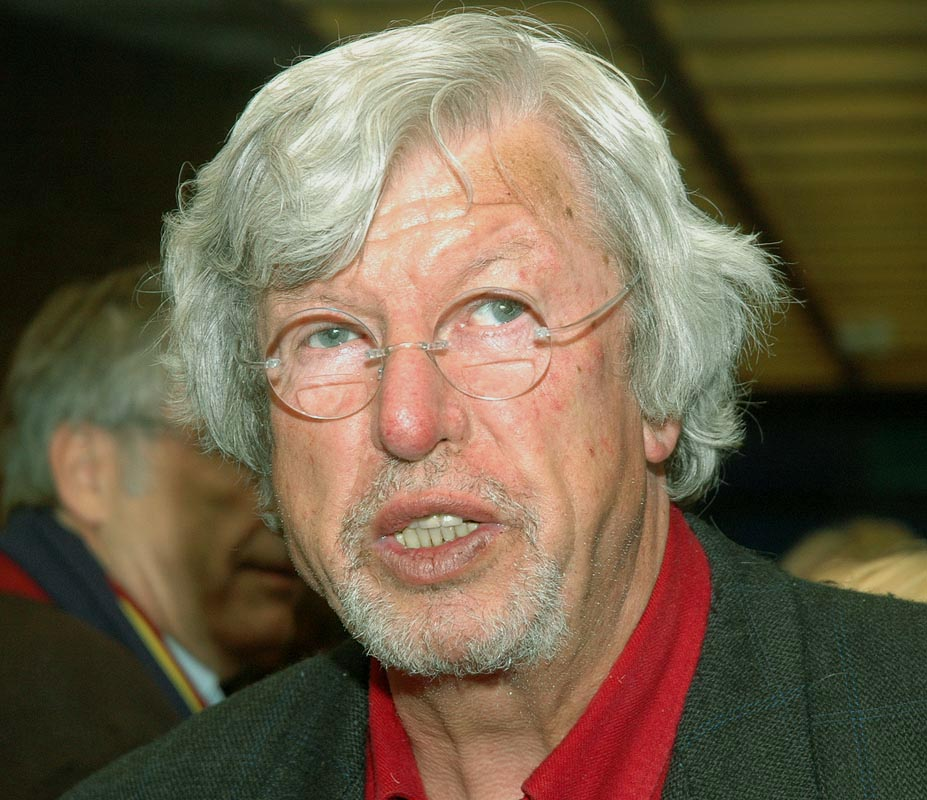

Ruge was originally a graduate sociologist and psychologist. He wrote 37 cabaret programs and ten plays. Special recognition gained Ruge Hanns Dieter Hüsch as a partner in the WDR series Hammer and Graver. He served as Dieter Hildebrandt's active co-author for many of his works.

The comedian was married and lived in Munich since 1967. Since about 2005, he was seen occasionally with his son Boris. Ruge died on October 8, 2014, at the age of 74 after a long illness in Munich.

== Awards ==
- German Cabaret Award (1974)
- Salzburger Stier (1985)
- Schwabing Art Prize (2000)
- Cabaret Award of the City of Munich (2003)
