= Max Greger =

German jazz musician, saxophonist, big band bandleader and conductor

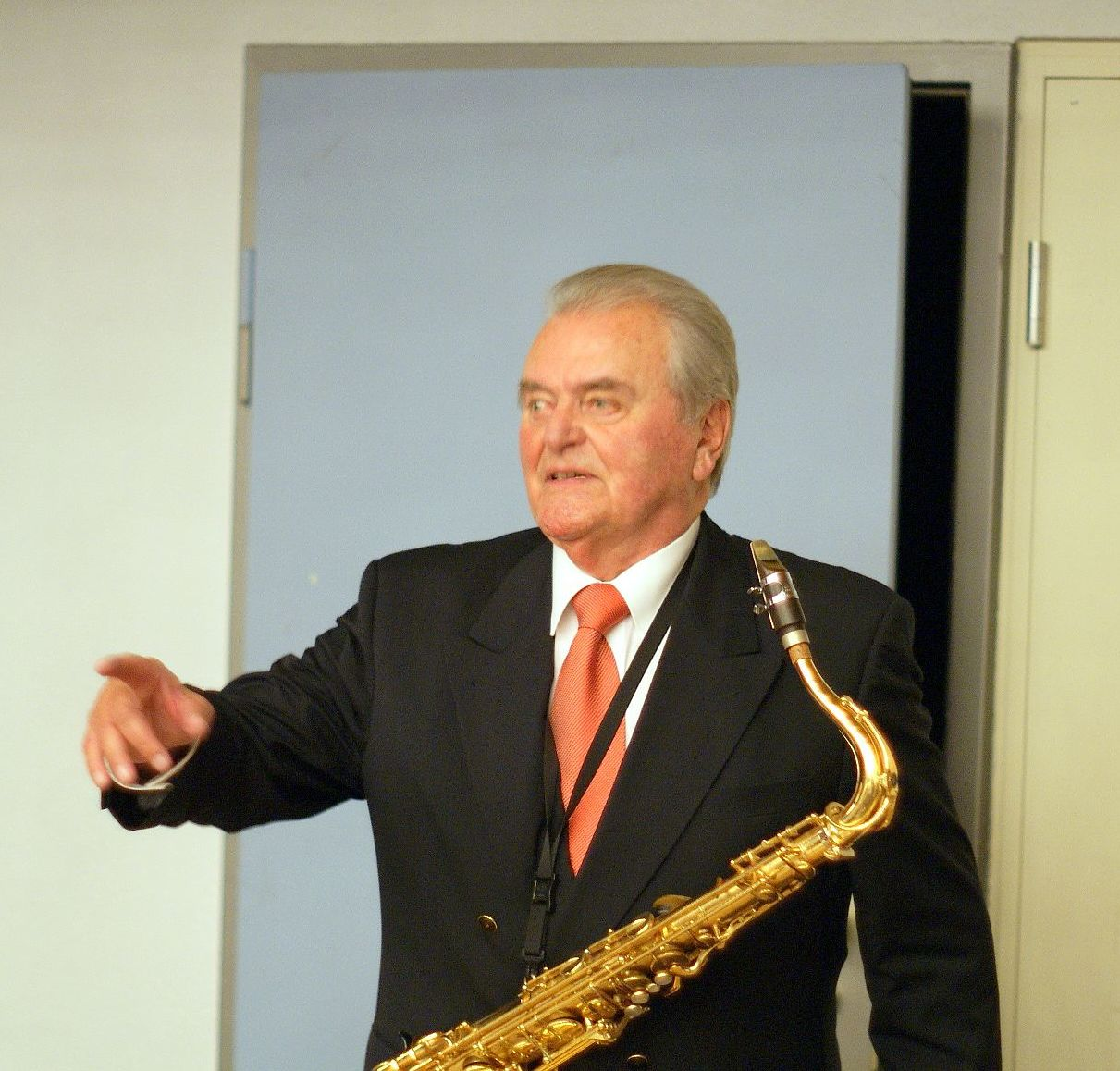
Greger, 2008

Max Greger (German: [maks ˈɡʁeːɡɐ]; 2 April 1926, in Munich – 15 August 2015, in Munich) was a German jazz musician, saxophonist, big band bandleader and conductor. He recorded over 150 records in jazz and pop music.

In 1948 he founded his first sextet with musicians, including Hugo Strasser. In 1959 his orchestra was the first western orchestra to tour the Soviet Union. In 1963 he put together an orchestra for ZDF.

His son, Max Greger Jr. and grandson, Max Greger III, are also musicians.

== Selected albums ==
- European Jazz Sounds (1963), Brunswick Records 267 918, Polydor 829 257-2
- Yakety Sax (1964), Polydor 237 374
- Maximum (1965), Brunswick, Polydor 825 703-2
- Ball Paré (1965), Polydor 237 483
- Tanz mit mir (1965), Polydor 249 034
- Eine kleine Tanzmusik (1966), Polydor 249 066
- Greger in the Night (1966), Polydor 249 103
- Greger in Rio (196?), Polydor 249 112
- Live – „Tour de dance“ with 28 Hits and Evergreens (196?), Polydor 249 273
- In the Mood for Dancing – 28 Glenn Miller Evergreens (1969), Polydor 249 315
- Sunshine Starshine (1969), Polydor 2371 009
- Gaudi in Bavaria (1970), Polydor 2371 046
- Max Greger plays Glenn Miller (1970), Polydor 2371 047
- Olympia-Dancing ’72 (1971), Polydor 2371 153
- Sax-Appeal (1971), Polydor 2371 197
- Trumpets Trumpets Trumpets (1971), Polydor 2371 198
- Hits marschieren auf – Folge 1 (1972), Polydor 2371 286
- Strictly for Dancing (1972), Polydor 2371 317
- Hits marschieren auf – Folge 2 (1973), Polydor 2371 379
- Tanz und trimm dich fit (1973), Polydor 2371 433
- Tanz ’74 (1973), Polydor 2371 434
- Hits marschieren auf – Folge 3 (1974), Polydor 2371 485
- Trimm und tanz dich top-fit (1974), Polydor 2371 513
- Tanz ’75 (1974), Polydor 2371 526
- Max, du hast das Tanzen raus (1975), Polydor 2371 570
- Soft-Ice Dancing (1975), Polydor 2371 589
- Top-fit in den Schnee (1975), Polydor 2371 607
- Tanz ’76 (1975), Polydor 2371 609
- Tanz mit mir – Folge 2 (1975), Polydor 2371 630
- Auf geht’s (1976), Polydor 2371 684
- Alles tanzt auf mein Kommando (1976), Polydor 2371 692
- Tanz mit mir – Folge 3 (1976), Polydor 2371 694
- Die Tanzplatte des Jahres ’77 (1976), Polydor 2371 720
- Die Tanzplatte des Jahres ’78 (1977), Polydor 2371 820
- Die Tanzplatte des Jahres ’79 (1978), Polydor 2371 921
- White Christmas (1979), Polydor Spectrum 551 299-2
- Tanz ist Trumpf – The Dancxe Party of the Year (1980), Polydor 2372 040
- Mach mal wieder Tanztag (1980; Sales: + 250,000; DE: gold disc), Polydor 2475 728
- Klassisches Tanzvergnügen (1984), Polydor 817 857-2
- Max Greger und sein Enzian-Sextett (1984), Polydor 821 650-2
- Supertanzmusik (1984), Polydor 823 687-2
- Traumzeit – Max Greger senior and junior and 100 enchanted violins (1986), Polydor 831 476-2
- Oscar-Melodien zum Tanzen (1987), Polydor 833 009-2
- Lovebird – The Saxy Feeling-Sound (1988), Polydor 833 921-2
- Evergreens im Glenn Miller sound (1988), Polydor 835 916-2
- Tanzen ’89 – Today & Traditional (1988), Polydor 837 316-2
- Mambo-Jambo – Tanzen im Latin-Sound, 1989, Polydor 837 929-2
- Tanzen ’90 – Today & Traditional, 1989, Polydor 841 166-2
- Tanzen ’91 (1990), Polydor 843 932-2
- Zauber der Berge – Max Greger and his Golden Bavaria Orchestra (1990), Polydor 843 933-2
- Laßt uns tanzen – Die klassische Tanzplatte (1991), Polydor 849 021-2
- Tanzen ’92 (1991), Polydor 511 071-2
- Sax in Love (1992), Polydor 513 040-2
- Tanzen ’93 (1992), Polydor 513 992-2
- Eine Reise ins Glück – in Billy Vaughn Sound (1993), Polydor 519 911-2
- Tanzen ’94 (1993), Polydor 519 912-2
- together – Greger und Greger (1995), Polydor 529 156-2
- world wide hits – Greger and Greger (1996), Polydor 533 508-2
- swingtime – Max Greger and the RIAS Big Band (1998), Polydor 559 855-2
- Night Train – Swing & Jazz Forever (1999), Polydor 543 393-2
- Happy Birthday! Max Greger 1980ths – 40 Hits, 2-CD compilation with 11 new titles (2006), Koch Universal 06024 9876941
- Hallo, kleines Fräulein, Compilation 1958 - 1965, „Jazzclub“-Reihe (2007), Universal 06024 9845696
- Greger's Groove Party, Compilation 1965 - 1973, „Jazzclub“-Reihe (2008), Universal 06007 5307296

== Recognition ==
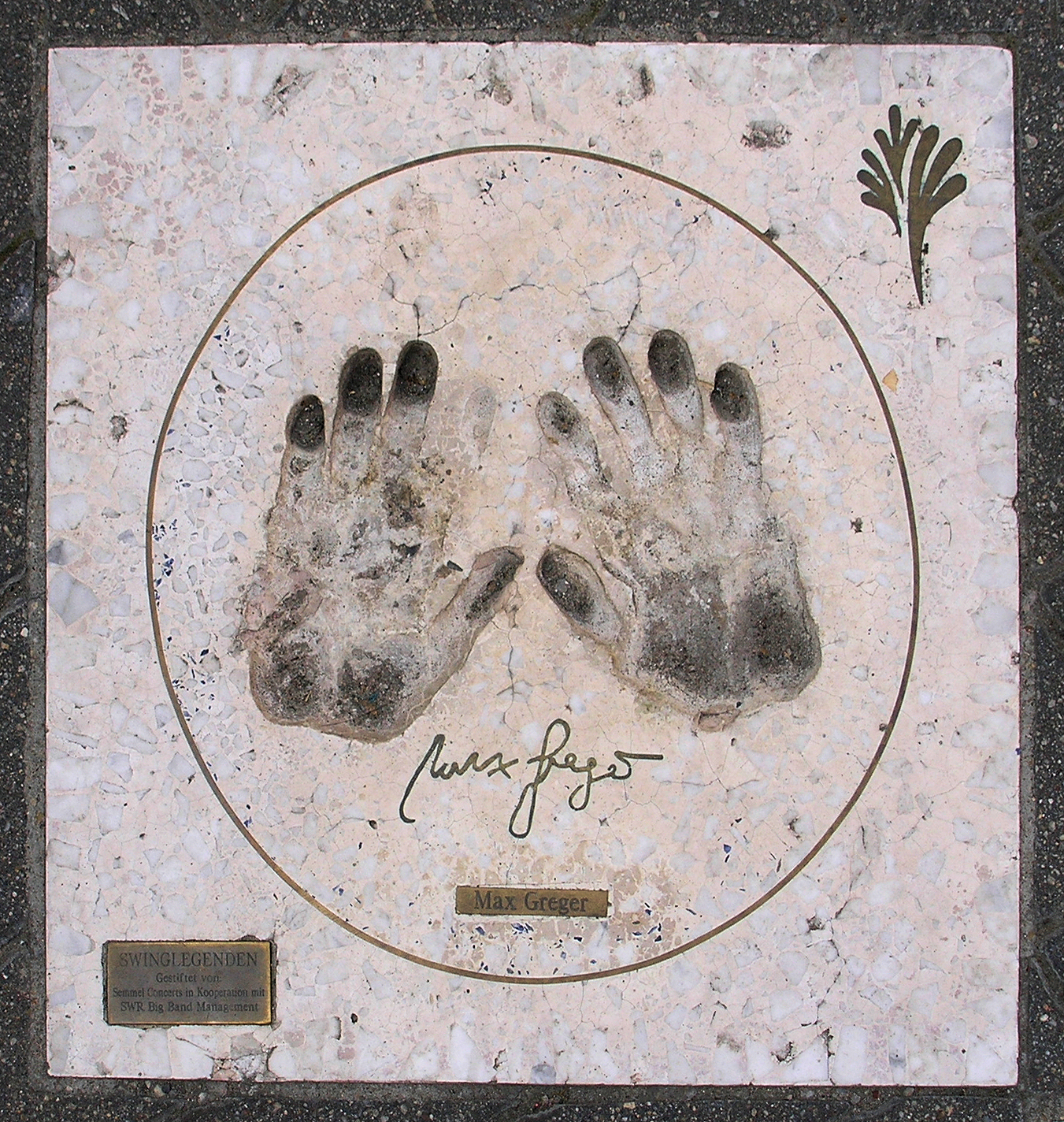
Max Greger's memorial plaque

- 1987: Officers Cross of the Order of Merit of the Federal Republic of Germany
- 2012: Bavarian Order of Merit
- There is a memorial plaque with his handprints and signature in Berlin-Mitte
