= Iberl-Bühne =

German theatre

Coordinates: 48°04′15″N 11°30′53″E

Iberl-Bühne is a theatre in Munich, Bavaria, Germany.
