= Silke Aichhorn =

German harpist

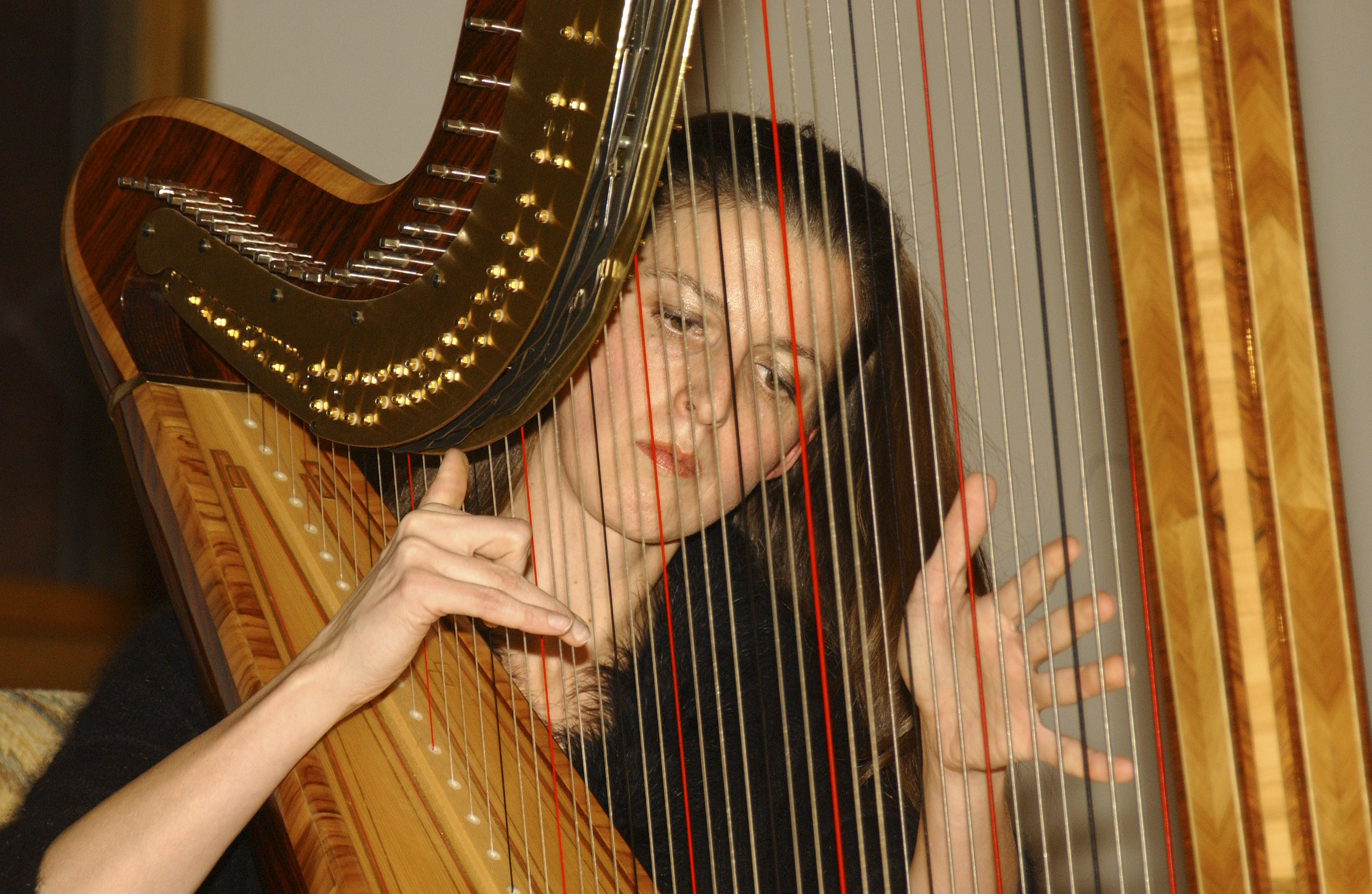
- Education: Conservatoire de Lausanne; Hochschule für Musik und Tanz Köln (Cologne University of Music)
- Occupation: Harpist

Silke Aichhorn (born 1974) is a German harpist who performs as a soloist as well as a chamber musician.

Aichhorn started studying the harp in 1981 with Ursula Lentrodt at the Traunstein music school. She entered the Conservatoire de Lausanne in 1990, where she studied with French harpist Chantal Mathieu. In 1997, she earned her Master of Arts from professor Han-An Liu at the Hochschule für Musik und Tanz Köln (Cologne University of Music).

With an extensive repertoire, she has recorded with various chamber music ensembles, as a soloist with orchestra at international festivals, as well as in television and broadcasting. In addition to concert appearances in Europe, she has been a guest player in Thailand, Japan and the USA. She works regularly with the flautist Dejan Gavric and the harpist Regine Kofler. In 2006 she founded her own CD label, HÖRMUSIK.
