= Haindling =

German band

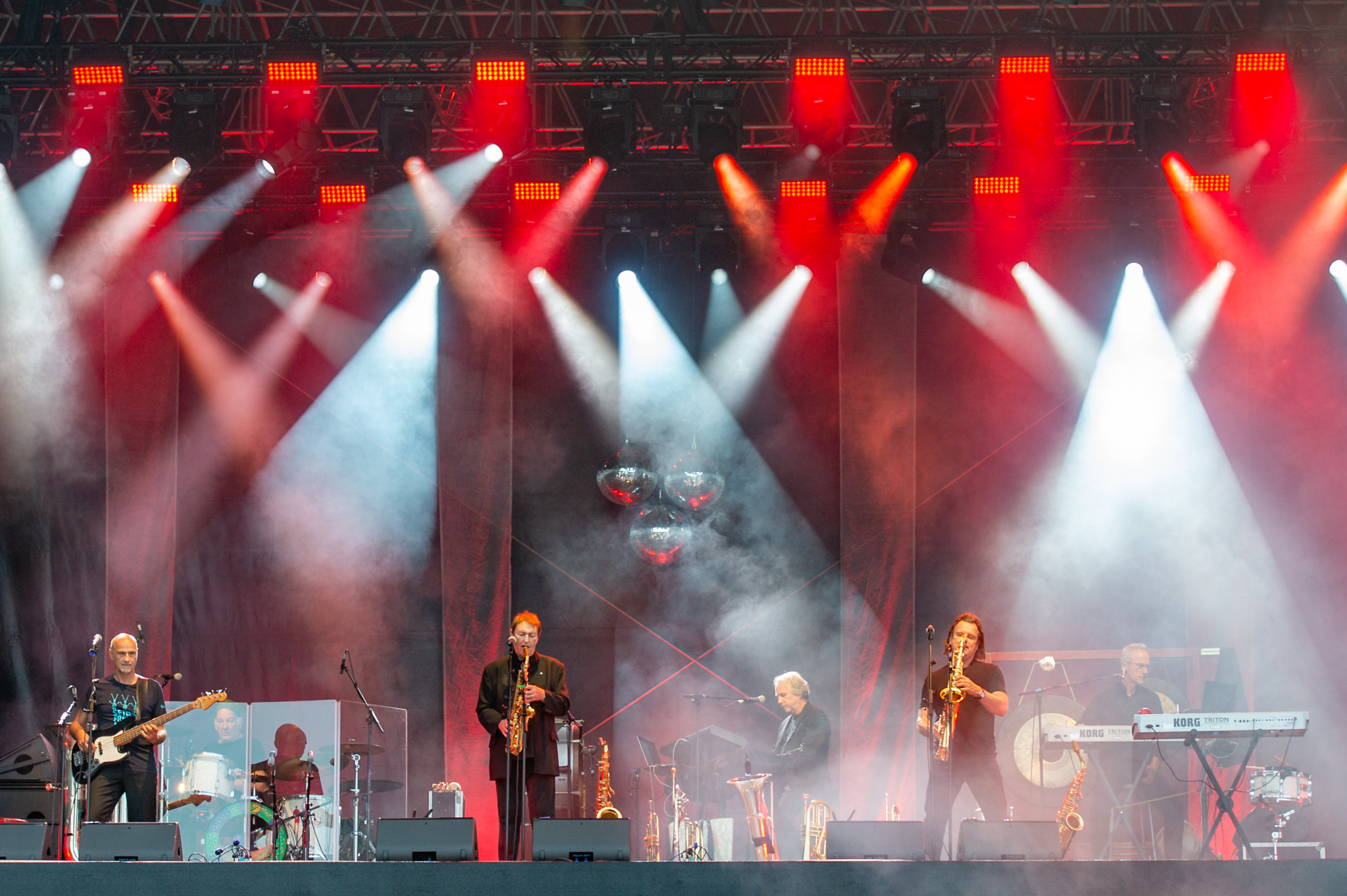

Background information
- Origin: Geiselhöring, Germany
- Genres: Neue Volksmusik; jazz fusion; world music
- Years active: since 1982

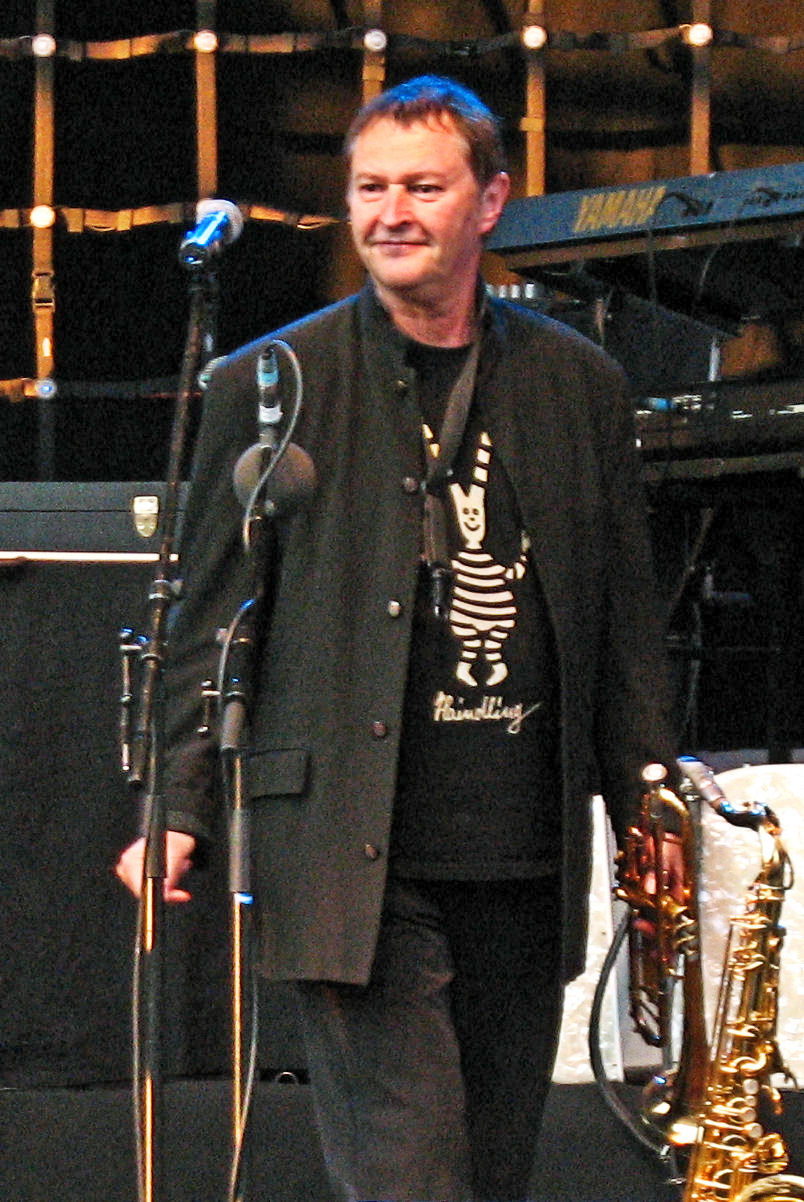
Founder and band leader Hans-Jürgen Buchner

Haindling is a German band founded in 1983 by Hans-Jürgen Buchner. The band specializes in Bavarian world music, a mixture of different musical styles such as pop, rock, folk, ambient, jazz and classical music. Most of the songs are written in Bavarian language. Haindling is famous for instrumentals and film scores composed by Buchner. The name of the band derives from the small village Haindling within the town of Geiselhöring in Lower Bavaria.

== Description ==
Haindling has composed music for television series and theatrical movies, including Irgendwie und Sowieso, Zur Freiheit, Café Meineid, Der Kaiser von Schexing, Der Schandfleck, Bavaria, Margarete Steiff, among others.

== Members ==
- Hans-Jürgen Buchner (founder, composer, songwriter, sax, flugelhorn, tuba, trumpet, keyboards, guitar, percussion, vocals)
- Michael Braun (sax, trumpet, tp, mellophone, keyboards, percussion, vocals)
- Peter Enderlein (drums, percussion)
- Wolfgang Gleixner (bass, percussion, vocals)
- Reinhold Hoffmann (keyboards, sax, oboe, mellophone, vocals)
- Michael Ruff (keyboards)

== Albums ==
1. Haindling 1 (1982, Polydor)
2. Stilles Potpourri (1984, Polydor) (D# 32)
3. Spinn i (1985, Polydor)
4. Meuterei (1986, Polydor)
5. Höhlenmalerei (1987, Polydor)
6. Muh (1989, Polydor) (D# 68)
7. 7 (1991, Polydor)
8. Haindling (1993, BMG Ariola)
9. Weiß (1995, BMG Ariola) (D# 43)
10. Perlen (1996 BMG Ariola)
11. Zwischenlandung (1998, BMG Ariola) (D# 41)
12. Tigerentenliederchen (2000, BMG Ariola)
13. Filmmusik (2000, BMG Ariola) (D# 85)
14. Karussell (2002, BMG Ariola) (D# 45)
15. Vivaldi & Vier Jahreszeiten (2004, BMG Ariola)
16. Ein Schaf denkt nach (2009, Ariola/Sony Music)
17. Bavaria Traumreise Durch Bayern (2012, BMG Ariola)

== Awards ==
- German Music Award, Best Album National, 1982
- Pro meritis scientiae et litterarum (2000)
- Bayerischer Verdienstorden (2005)
- Sonderpreis des Kulturpreises Bayern (2005)
- Bayerischer Poetentaler (2005)
- Bairische Sprachwurzel (2007)
- Bayerische Naturschutzmedaille (2008)
- Culture Award, Bayerische Landesstiftung (2011)
- Bayerische Verfassungsmedaille (2013)
- Sigi-Sommer-Taler (2015)
- Bayerische Staatsmedaille für besondere Verdienste um die Umwelt / Bavarian State Medal for Special Services to the Environment (2015)
- Ambassador of Kulturerbe Bayern (2018)
