= Biermösl Blosn =

Bavarian musical and cabaret band, 1976–2012

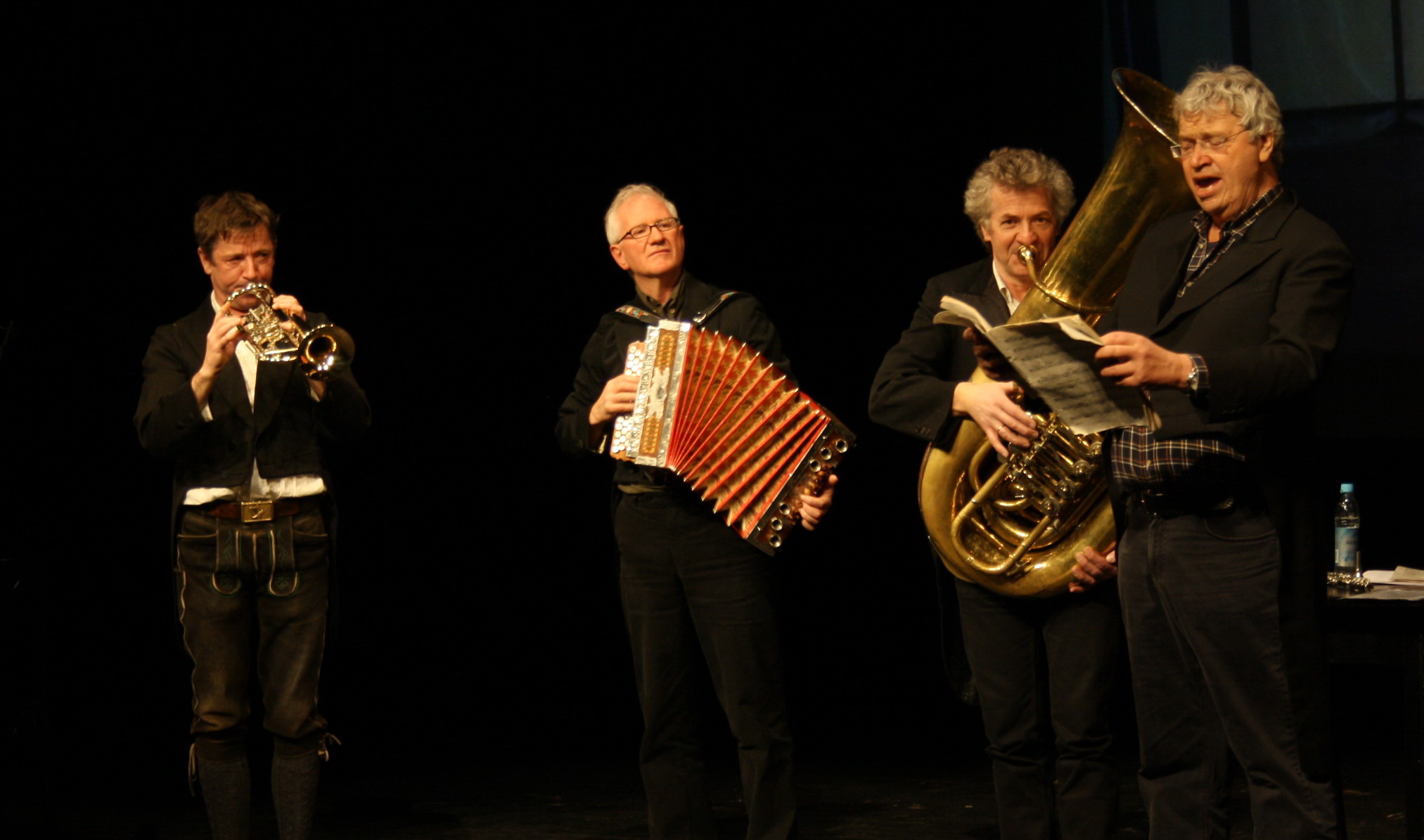
- Biermösl Blosn and Gerhard Polt (2010)

Background information
- Origin: Fürstenfeldbruck, Germany
- Genres: cabaret, satirical music
- Years active: 1976– 2012
- Members: Hans Well; Christoph Well; Michael Well
- Website: www.biermoesl-blosn.de

Biermösl Blosn was a Bavarian musical and cabaret band known for combining satirical texts with traditional folk music. It was founded in 1976 by three brothers - Hans, Christoph and Michael Well - and often works with political cabaret artist Gerhard Polt. The name derives from "Beerenmoos" (berry bog), a part of the Haspelmoor in the district of Fürstenfeldbruck that was planned to be transformed in a large airport and a waste dump, and "Blosn", a Bavarian word for "group".

== History ==
The band was founded in 1976 by brothers Hans (born 1 May 1953, Willprechtszell), Christoph (born 3 December 1959, Günzlhofen) and Michael Well (born 10 October 1958, Günzlhofen) in Fürstenfeldbruck. Three years later, their first hit Gott mit dir, du Land der BayWa, was broadcast on the Bayerischer Rundfunk (BR) television channel. The song lampoons the Bavarian national anthem changing the text to criticize massive use of fertilizer in Bavarian farming (which was at that time mostly sold by the BayWa). Following the broadcast, the band as well as the journalists at the BR were attacked for such a "sacrilege". This led to the BR not broadcasting the music of the group for years. In 1979, the group first went on stage together with Gerhard Polt. The group announced in August 2011, they will play a final concert in January 2012 and then disband. They gave their last concert in the city of Fürth, Bavaria on January, 18th, 2012.

== Music style ==
The band specializes in combining satirical lyrics with folk melodies to create political songs, mostly endorsing causes of groups of the political left, like the German Green party or the Young Socialists. Aside from their main musical style, they also recorded multiple albums with children's songs together with their own children and have acted in theater shows.

== Causes ==
The band has used their music to protest against multiple projects; amongst them were the planned nuclear reprocessing plant Wackersdorf plant in Wackersdorf, the Bundesautobahn 94, as well as several scandals of the long time governing party of Bavaria, the Christian Social Union of Bavaria.

== Critical reactions ==
In 1997, the band was denied the Upper Bavarian prize for culture for being too "leftist". In 2001, the Bavarian ministry of education disallowed the song Gott mit dir, du Land der BayWa, which was the band's first hit, from being used in a song book for the eighth grade for "lampooning the Bavarian national anthem" and ordered the whole order of books, 75,000 copies, to be destroyed.

== Awards ==
- 2000 - Wilhelm Hoegner award of the Bavarian SPD (alongside Jörg Hube)
- 2005 - Deutsche RUTH
- 2007 - Großer Karl Valentin Preis (together with Gerhard Polt)
- Ernst-Hoferichter-Preis
- Award of the Belgischer Rundfunk
- Ludwig-Thoma-medal
- Prix Pantheon: "Reif und bekloppt"
- Green twig (Bund Naturschutz in Bayern)
- Grüner Wanninger (German Green party)
- First Bavarian beer award "Der goldene Spaten"

== Releases ==
=== Studio albums ===
- Ex voto (1980)
- Grüß Gott, mein Bayernland (1982)
- Tschüß Bayernland (1985)
- Freibank Bayern (feat. Gerhard Polt) (1987, 2007)
- Jodelhorrormonstershow (1991)
- Sepp, Depp, Hennadreck (children's songs) (1993)
- Wo samma (feat. Die Toten Hosen) (1994)
- Klampfn Toni (feat. Attwenger, Fredl Fesl, Georg Ringsgwandl, Hans Söllner etc.) (1996)
- Wellcome to Bavaria (1998)
- Grüaß di Gott Christkindl (Nativity play) (1998)
- Erfolg (Audio book feat. Jörg Hube) (2001)
- Zing Zang Zing – Sepp, Depp, Hennadreck II (children's songs) (2001)
- Räuber & Gendarm (2002)
- Der unbekannte Valentin (feat. Gerhard Polt and Gisela Schneeberger) (2002)
- Unterbayern (live) (2003)
- Auftanz (Bavarian and international folk dances) (2006)
- Stoibers Vermächtnis (feat. Gert Heidenreich, Gerhard Polt und Jörg Hube) (2007)
- Rundumadum (international children's songs) (2007)
- Jubiläum("Best of" album feat. Gerhard Polt) (2009)

=== DVDs ===
- Bayern Open (feat. Gerhard Polt) (2006)
- Tschurangrati (feat. Gerhard Polt) (2006)
- Obatzt Is/Crème Bavaroise (feat. Gerhard Polt) (2006)
- Offener Vollzug (feat. Gerhard Polt) (2008)

=== Song books ===
- Biermösl Blosn: Das Liederbuch. Haffmans, Zürich 1994, ISBN 3-251-00149-3
- Biermösl Blosn: Grüß Gott, mein Bayernland. Das zweite Liederbuch. Haffmans, Zürich 1994
- Biermösl Blosn: Grüß Gott, mein Bayernland. Econ & List, München 1999, ISBN 3-612-26613-6
- Christoph Well, Hans Well, Reinhard Michl: Sepp, Depp, Hennadreck. Hieber, München, ISBN 978-3-938223-14-7
- Christoph Well, Michael Well, Hans Well, Reinhard Michl: Zing Zang Zing. Hieber, München, ISBN 978-3-938223-27-7
- Christoph Well, Michael Well, Hans Well, Reinhard Michl: Grüaß di Gott Christkindl. Hieber, München, ISBN 978-3-938223-21-5
- Hans Well: Rundumadum. Kein & Aber, Zürich, ISBN 978-3-0369-5509-4

=== Stage productions ===
- 1984 München leuchtet Münchner Kammerspiele
- 1988 Diridari Münchner Kammerspiele
- 1993 Tschurangrati Münchner Kammerspiele
- 1996 Bayern Open Münchner Kammerspiele
- 2002 Crème Bavaroise – Obatzt is Bayerisches Staatsschauspiel
- 2005 Abvent
- 2006 Offener Vollzug – ein Staatsschauspiel Bayerisches Staatsschauspiel
