= Jalometalli Metal Music Festival =

Finnish heavy metal festival

Coordinates: 64°59′59″N 25°27′55″E

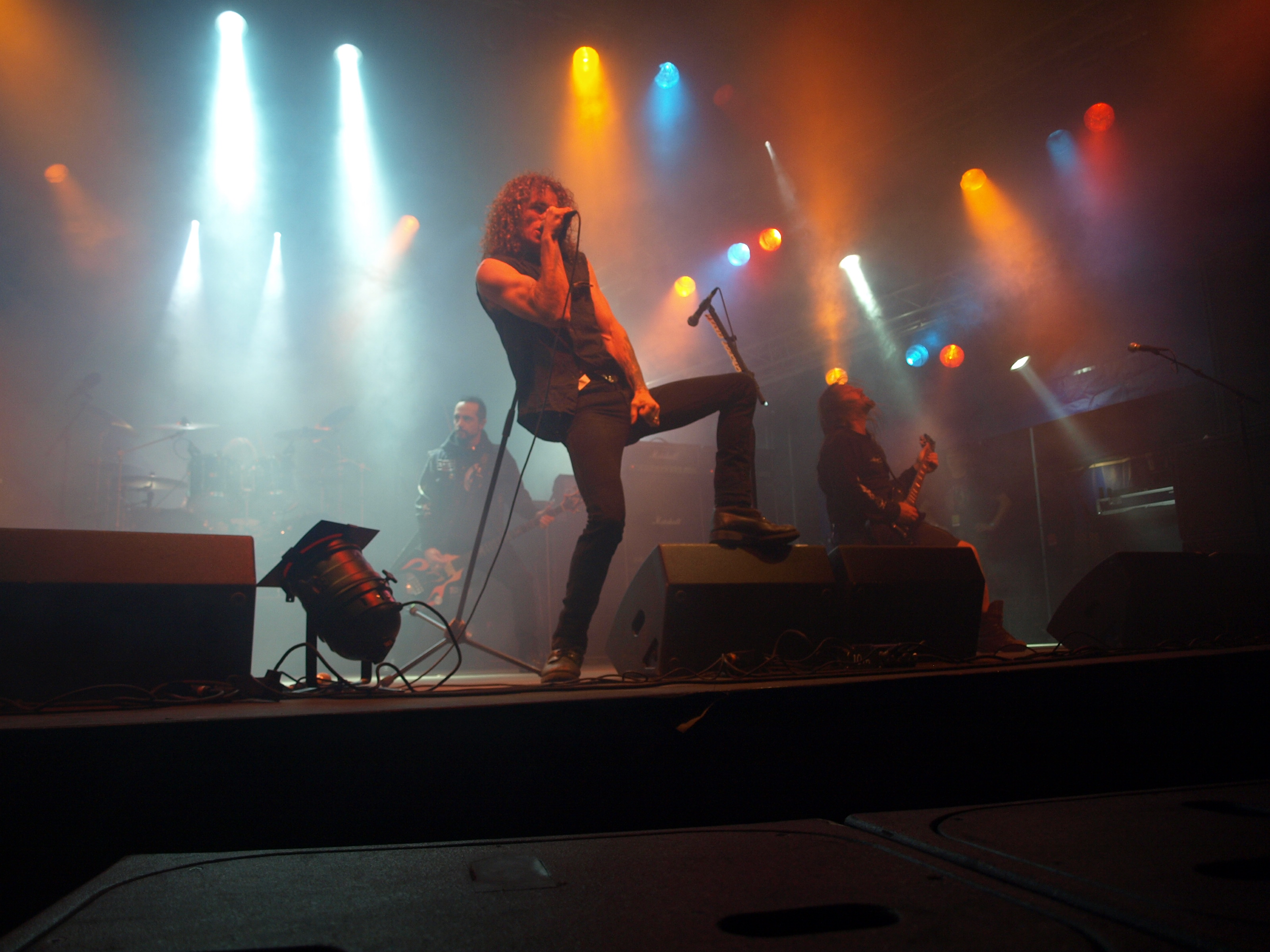
- Overkill performing at the Jalometalli Metal Music Festival in 2008
- Genre: Extreme metal, heavy metal
- Dates: August
- Locations: Oulu, Finland
- Years active: 2002–2016

Jalometalli Metal Music Festival was a Finnish heavy metal festival held annually in Oulu since 2002. The festival mainly featured old school thrash metal, death metal, and black metal bands. The festival was held for the last time in 2016.

== Lineups ==
=== 2002 ===
- Thyrane
- Monsterspank
- Funeris Nocturnum
- Maple Cross

=== 2003 ===
- Sicknote
- Thyrane
- Sethery
- Embraze
- Wounds
- Wengele

=== 2004 ===
Held on 20 and 21 August at Kuusisaari in Oulu.

20 August

- Diamanthian
- Thyrane
- Neolith
- For My Pain...
- Kalmah
- Sethery
- Fore
- The Howl, Downfade

21 August

- The Duskfall
- Devilyn
- Pain Confessor
- Maple Cross
- Lambs
- Sacred Crucifix
- Final Dawn
- Crematory
- Dark Flood
- Letheria
- Wengele
- Mors Subita

=== 2005 ===
Held on 19 and 20 August at Kuusisaari in Oulu. A closing party was held on 20 August at Hevimesta in Oulu.

19 August

- Dissection
- Exmortem
- Atakhama
- Deathbound
- For My Pain...
- Machine Men
- Sicknote
- Swallow the Sun
- Wrathage

20 August

- Entombed
- Sotajumala
- Brussel Kaupallinen
- De Lirium's Order
- Deathchain
- Embraze
- Lambs
- Malicious Death
- National Napalm Syndicate
- Omnium Gatherum
- Reflexion

Closing party

- Wasara
- Amplifire

=== 2006 ===
Held on 18 and 19 August at Club Teatria in Oulu.

18 August

- Helloween (GER)
- Dismember (SWE)
- The Duskfall (SWE/FIN)
- Tarot
- Kalmah
- Rotten Sound
- Manitou
- Ajattara
- Fall of the Idols
- Ghost Machinery

19 August

- U.D.O. (GER)
- Onslaught (GBR)
- Reverend Bizarre
- Swallow the Sun
- Thunderstone
- Moonsorrow
- Enochian Crescent
- Embraze
- Before the Dawn
- Rytmihäiriö
- Hellbox
- The Scourger
- Slugathor

=== 2007 ===
Held on 17 and 18 August at Club Teatria in Oulu.

Friday 17 August

- Testament (USA)
- Rotting Christ (GR)
- Unleashed (SWE)
- Eternal Tears of Sorrow
- Deathchain
- Amoral
- Horna
- Omnium Gatherum
- National Napalm Syndicate
- Perfect Chaos

Saturday 18 August

- Kreator (GER)
- Candlemass (SWE)
- Holy Moses (GER)
- Insomnium
- Machine Men
- Twilightning
- Kiuas
- Domination Black
- Burning Point
- Altaria
- Sacred Crucifix
- Profane Omen

=== 2008 ===
Friday 15 August

- Masterstroke
- Adastra
- Prestige
- Pantheon I (NOR)
- Sadistic Intent (USA)
- Mortal Sin (AUS)
- Possessed (USA)
- Blitzkrieg (GBR)
- Overkill (USA)
- Turisas

Saturday 16 August

- Fall of the Idols
- Heavy Metal Perse
- Catamenia
- Kalmah
- Desaster (GER)
- Evocation (SWE)
- Barathrum
- Sotajumala
- Astral Doors (SWE)
- Mayhem (NOR)
- Trouble (USA)
- Satyricon (NOR)
- KYPCK

=== 2009 ===
Friday 14 August

- Deathchain
- Burning Point
- Solstafir
- Stormwarrior
- Hail of Bullets
- Rage
- Voivod

Saturday 15 August

- Gnostic
- Torture Killer
- Artillery
- Nifelheim
- Paradox
- Asphyx
- Whiplash
- Atheist
- Agent Steel
- Death Angel

=== 2010 ===
Friday 13 August

- Machina
- Inferia
- Rytmihäiriö
- Destruction
- Dream Evil
- Suffocation
- Macabre
- Carcass
- Lord Vicar

Saturday 14 August

- Sadistik Forest
- Forced Kill
- Coprolith
- Urn
- Black Crucifixion
- Melechesh
- Demilich
- Gorgoroth
- Ross The Boss
- Triptykon
- Angel Witch
