= Bible errata =

Typographical errors that have occurred in various editions of The Bible

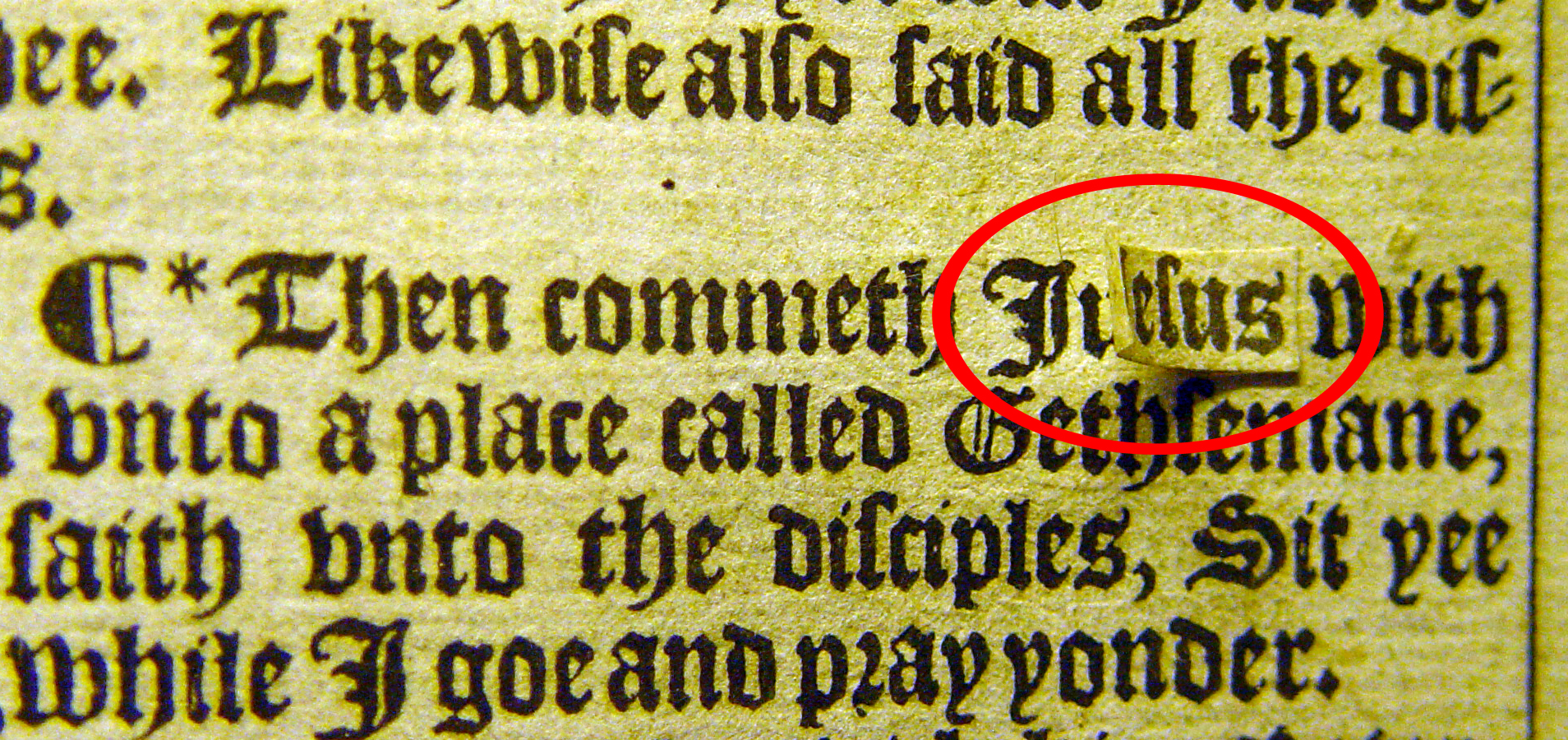
The "Judas Bible" (1613) contains a misprint in Matthew 26:36, in which the name "Judas" appears instead of "Jesus". In this copy, a slip of paper has been pasted over the misprint (circled in red). (Note: According to a note in St Mary's Church, Totnes, Cornwall)

Throughout history, printers' errors, unconventional translations (Note: Note that Bibles with an unconventional but deliberate overall translation style, such as an idiomatic style, a dynamic equivalence style or a paraphrasitic style, are not included in this list.) and translation mistakes have appeared in a number of published Bibles. Bibles with features considered to be erroneous are known as Bible errata, and were often destroyed or suppressed due to their contents being considered heretical by some.

== Manuscript Bibles ==
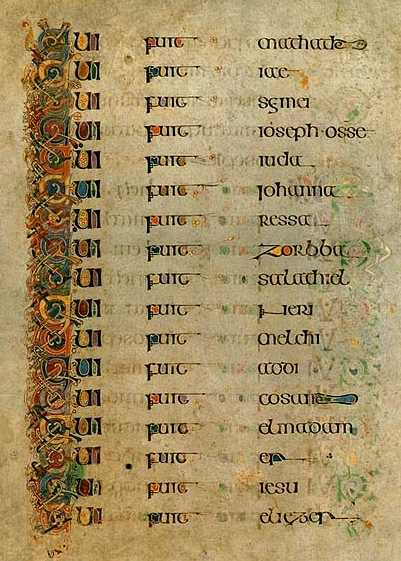
A page from the genealogy of Jesus, in Kells

=== The Book of Kells, c. 800 ===
The Book of Kells features two errors within its text:

- The genealogy of Jesus, in the Gospel of Luke, lists an extra ancestor in Luke 3:26. This error is considered to have resulted from the transcriber reading the phrase "QUI FUIT MATHATHIAE" as "QUI FUIT MATHATH IAE", with the "IAE" being considered an additional individual, resulting in the lines "QUI FUIT MATHATH" and the additional "QUI FUIT IAE", rather than the singular "QUI FUIT MATHATHIAE".
- In the Gospel of Matthew, 10:34b should read "I came not to send peace, but the sword". However, rather than the Latin gladium, meaning "sword", the Book of Kells has gaudium, meaning "joy", rendering the verse "I came not [only] to send peace, but [also] joy".

=== The Book of Deer, 10th century ===
The Scottish Book of Deer in Cambridge University Library has a number of errors. In the genealogy of Jesus in the Gospel of Luke, it has Seth as the first man and grandfather of Adam.

== Printed Bibles ==
=== Geneva ===
- "Place-makers' Bible" 1562: the second edition of the Geneva Bible, Matthew 5:9 reads "Blessed are the placemakers: for they shall be called the children of God"; it should read "peacemakers".
  - In its chapter heading for Luke 21, the Place-makers' Bible has "Christ condemneth the poor widow", rather than "commendeth".

=== Douai ===
- "Manchester edition" 1793: The heading on Chapter 3 of Leviticus and the first verse has "bees" rather than "beeves" (plural of beef). It reads: "How the pacifique hosts must be of bees, sheep, lambs and goats" ("pacifique hosts" meaning peace offerings).

=== King James ===
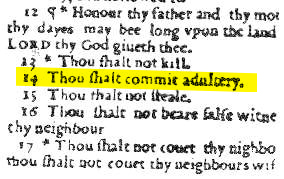
The Wicked Bible of 1631 renders Exodus 20:14 as "thou shalt commit adultery" instead of "thou shalt not commit adultery"

In various printings of the King James Version of the Bible, some of the more famous examples have been given their own names. Among them are:

- "Printers Bible", from 1612: In some copies, Psalm 119:161 reads, "Printers have persecuted me without a cause", rather than "Princes have persecuted me..."
- "Judas Bible", from 1613: This Bible has Judas, not Jesus, saying "Sit ye here while I go yonder and pray" (Matthew 26:36). A second folio edition printed by Robert Barker, printer to King James I, is held in St. Mary's Church, Totnes, Devon. In this copy, the misprint has been covered with a small slip of paper glued over the name of Judas.
- "Wicked Bible", "Adulterous Bible" or "Sinner's Bible", from 1631: Barker and Lucas: Omits an important "not" from Exodus 20:14, making the seventh commandment read "Thou shalt commit adultery." An 1886 study of Star Chamber case reports suggests that this was just one of the "two grossest errors" in the printing, alongside Deuteronomy 5:24, which read "the LORD our God hath shewed us his glory and his great-asse" instead of the correct "greatness[e]". The printers were fined £300 and most of the copies were recalled immediately. Only 15 copies survive in the collections of public institutions in the English-speaking world.
- "More Sea Bible", from 1641: "...the first heaven and the first earth were passed away and there was more sea", rather than "...the first heaven and the first earth were passed away and there was no more sea", from Revelation 21:1.
- "Unrighteous Bible" or "Wicked Bible", from 1653, Cambridge Press: Another edition carrying this title omits a "not" before the word "inherit", making 1 Corinthians 6:9 read "Know ye not that the unrighteous shall inherit the kingdom of God?". In addition, Romans 6:13 reads "Neither yield ye your members as instruments of righteousness into sin", where it should read "unrighteousness".
- "Sin On Bible", from 1716: Jeremiah 31:34 reads "sin on more" rather than "sin no more".

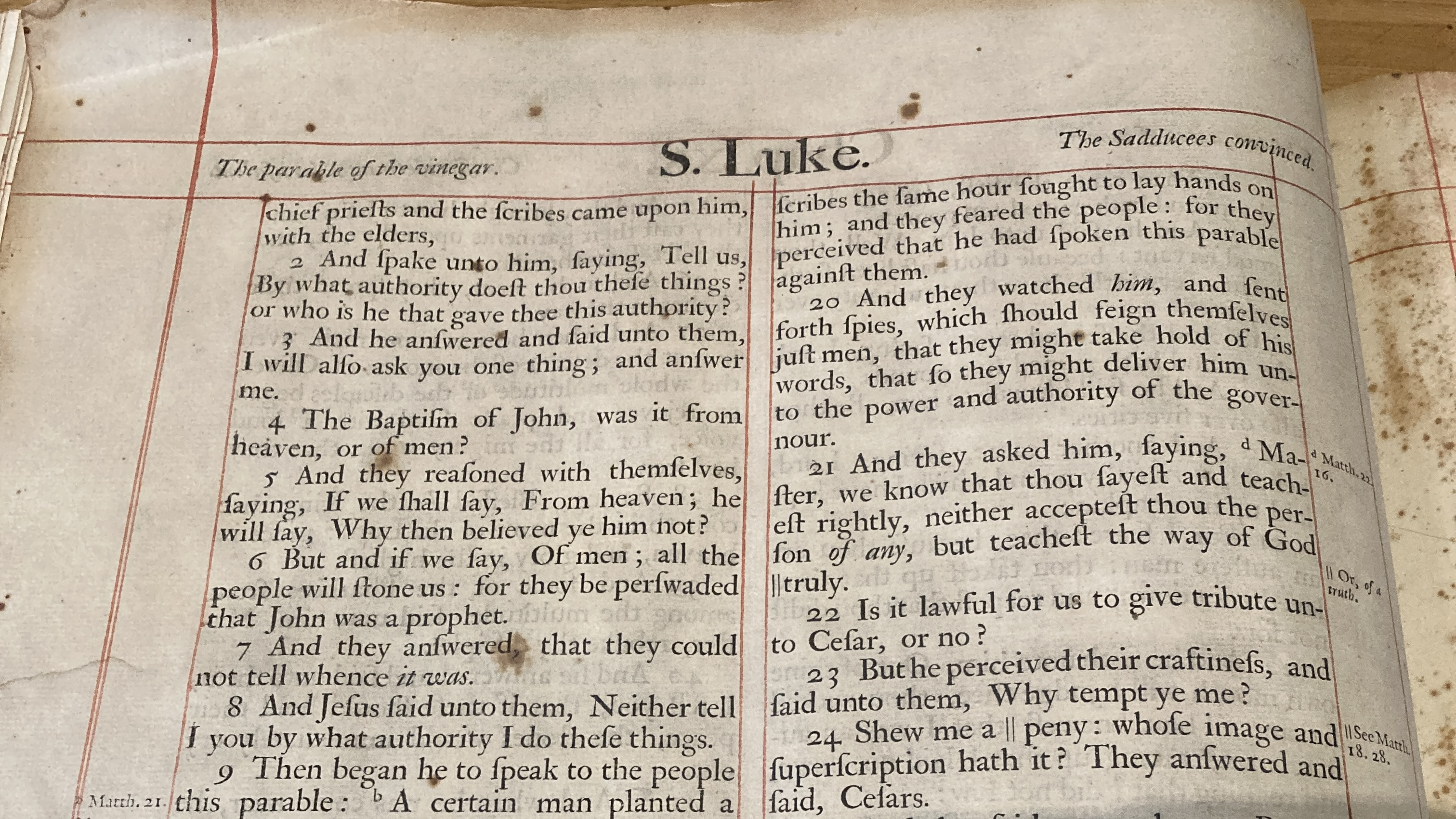
Heading for "The Parable of the Vineyard" in a copy of the "Vinegar Bible"

- "Vinegar Bible", from 1717: J. Baskett, Clarendon Press: The chapter heading for Luke 20 reads "The Parable of the Vinegar" instead of "The Parable of the Vineyard." One reviewer called this particular edition "a Baskett full of errors" due to the abundance of typographical errors. One copy sold for $5,000 in 2008.
- "The Fools Bible", from 1763: Psalm 14:1 reads "the fool hath said in his heart there is a God", rather than "there is no God". The printers were fined £3,000 and all copies ordered destroyed.
- "The Killer Bible", from 1795: "Filled" is replaced by "killed", making Mark 7:27 read: "Let the children first be killed".
- "Murderer's Bible", from 1801: "Murmurers" is printed as "murderers", making Jude 16 read: "These are murderers, complainers, walking after their own lusts; and their mouth speaketh great swelling words, having men's persons in admiration because of advantage."
- "To-remain Bible", from 1805: In Galatians 4:29, a proofreader had written in "to remain" in the margin, as an answer to whether a comma should be deleted. The note inadvertently became part of the text, making the edition read "But as then he that was born after the flesh persecuted him that was born after the Spirit to remain, even so it is now."
- "Standing Fishes Bible", from 1806: "Fishes" replaced "fishers" making Ezekiel 47:10 read "And it shall come to pass, that the fishes shall stand upon it from Engedi even unto Eneglaim; they shall be a place to spread forth nets; their fish shall be according to their kinds, as the fish of the great sea, exceeding many."
- "Wife-hater Bible", from 1810: "Wife" replaces "life" in this edition, making Luke 14:26 redundantly read "If any man come to me, and hate not his father, and mother, and wife, and children, and brethren, and sisters, yea, and his own wife also, he cannot be my disciple."
- "The Large Family Bible", from 1820: Isaiah 66:9 reads: "Shall I bring to birth and not cease to bring forth?" rather than "Shall I bring to birth and not cause to bring forth?"
- "Rebecca's Camels Bible", from 1823: "Camels" replaces "damsels" in one instance, making Genesis 24:61 read "And Rebecca arose, and her camels, and they rode upon the camels, and followed the man: and the servant took Rebecca and went his way."
- "Owl Bible", from 1944: "Owl" replaces "own", making 1 Peter 3:5 read, "For after this manner in the old time the holy women also, who trusted God, adorned themselves, being in subjection unto their owl husbands." The error was caused by a printing plate with a damaged letter n.

== Fictional errata ==
- In the novel Good Omens, Neil Gaiman and Terry Pratchett created the "Buggre Alle This Bible" of 1651 (and the Charing Cross Bible). The typesetter replaced Ezekiel 48:5 with a rant complaining about his job. It also has three extra verses at the end of Genesis 3 about the loss of the flaming sword by the angel Aziraphale, added by Aziraphale himself, a character in the story.
- In the BBC science-fiction sitcom Red Dwarf, one of the main characters, Arnold Rimmer, tells of his family belonging to an obscure fundamentalist Christian sect, the "Seventh Day Advent Hoppists". According to Rimmer – who is revealed in another episode to have the middle name Judas due to his parents' unconventional take on Christianity – the Hoppists' unique form of worship arose from a misprinted Bible wherein 1 Corinthians 13:13 reads "Faith, hop and charity, and the greatest of these is hop." The membership consequently spent every Sunday hopping. Rimmer says he never agreed with the faith, but claims to be liberal on religious matters.
- The Poisonwood Bible is a 1998 bestselling novel by Barbara Kingsolver which mentions some of the famous "misprint Bibles" such as the Camel Bible, the Murderer's Bible, and the Bug Bible. The novel's title refers to the character of Nathan Price, a missionary in the 1950s Belgian Congo who creates his own "misprint" by mispronouncing the local expression "Tata Jesus is bängala", meaning "Jesus is most precious". In his pronunciation, he actually says "Jesus is poisonwood!"
- In the novel The Hundred-Year-Old Man Who Climbed Out the Window and Disappeared by the Swedish author Jonas Jonasson, a Bible erratum plays heavily into the plot. The Bibles in question carry an extra verse (Revelation 22:22), reading "And they all lived happily ever after".
