= Teloitus =

Studio album by Sotajumala
- Released: October 24, 2007
- Genre: Death metal
- Length: 38:53
- Label: Woodcut Records
- Producer: Sami Koivisto, Sotajumala

Sotajumala chronology
Death Metal Finland (2004)	Teloitus (2007)	Kuolemanpalvelus (2010)

Teloitus (Execution) is the second studio album by the Finnish death metal band Sotajumala. It entered the Finnish charts at position 17 on its release week.

== Track listing ==
No.	Title	Length
1.	"Tappaja ja tapettu" (The slayer and the slain)	5:47
2.	"Arkku vailla vainajaa" (A corpseless coffin)	3:52
3.	"Kuolinjulistus" (Declaration of death)	4:08
4.	"Riistetty viattomuus" (Ravaged innocence)	4:23
5.	"Verellä kirjoitettu" (Written in blood)	4:08
6.	"Oikeutus" (Justification)	4:02
7.	"Kidutus" (Torture)	4:39
8.	"Teloitus" (Execution)	7:54

== Personnel ==
- Mynni Luukkainen – vocals
- Kosti Orbinski – guitar
- Pete Lapio – guitar
- Tomi Otsala – bass, backing vocals
- Timo Häkkinen – drums
