= Typographical error =

Mistake made in typing printed material

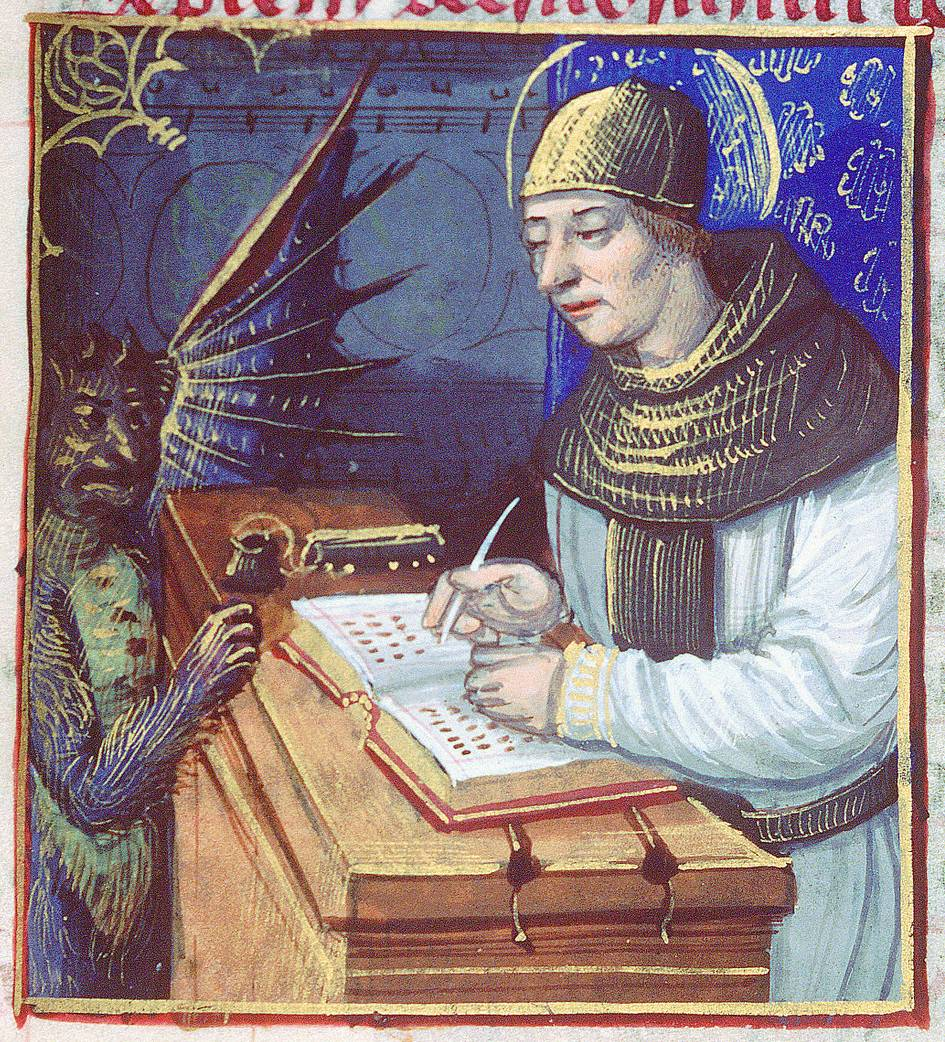
Titivillus is a demon said to introduce errors into the work of scribes. This is a 14th century illustration of Titivillus at a scribe's desk.

A typographical error (often shortened to typo), also called a misprint, is a spelling or transposition mistake made in the typing of printed or electronic material. Historically, this referred to mistakes in manual typesetting. The term is used of errors caused by mechanical failure or miskeying. Before the arrival of printing, the copyist's mistake or scribal error was the equivalent for manuscripts. Most typos involve simple duplication, omission, transposition, or substitution of a small number of characters.

== Marking typos ==
=== Typesetting ===
Historically, the process of converting a manuscript to a printed document required a typesetter to copy the text and print a first "galley proof" (familiarly, "a proof"). It may contain typographical errors ("printer's errors"), as a result of human error during typesetting. Traditionally, a proofreader compares the manuscript with the corresponding typeset portion, and then marks any errors (sometimes called "line edits") using standard proofreaders' marks.

=== Typing ===
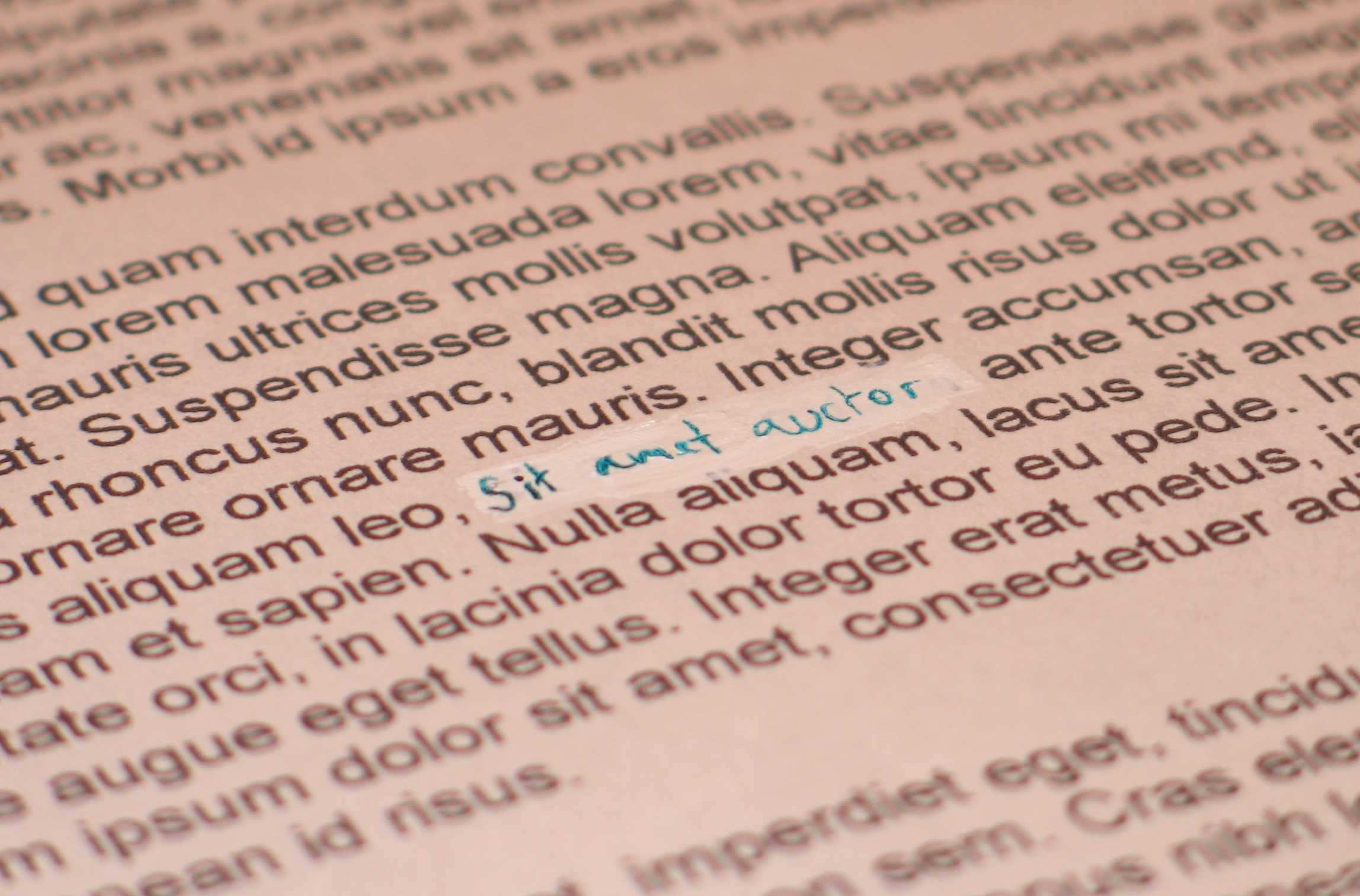
Correction fluid was often used to correct typographical errors as (or after) the document was typed. The fluid was painted over the error and, when dry, the correct spelling was written on the new surface. Exceptionally, printing errors were painted out and a handwritten correction applied.

When using a typewriter, typos were commonly struck out with another character such as a strikethrough. This saved the typist the trouble of retyping the entire page to eliminate the error, but as evidence of the typo remained, it was not aesthetically pleasing. Correction fluid and correction tape were invented to hide the original mark and allow the typist to correct the error almost invisibly. There were also specialised erasers to remove typescript. A more elaborate attempted solution was the "laser eraser" made by Arthur Leonard Schawlow, co-inventor of the laser. This used a laser to vaporize the ink of the typo, leaving the paper beneath unharmed. Although Schawlow received a patent for the invention, it was never produced commercially. Later typewriters such as the IBM Correcting Selectric incorporated correction features.

The development of word processors and office printers all but eliminated the need for these solutions.

=== Social media ===
In computer forums, sometimes "^H" (a visual representation of the ASCII backspace character) was used to "erase" intentional typos: "Be nice to this fool^H^H^H^Hgentleman, he's visiting from corporate HQ."

In instant messaging, users often send messages in haste and only afterward notice the typo. It is common practice to correct the typo by sending a subsequent message in which an asterisk (*) is placed before (or after) the correct word.

=== Textual analysis ===
In formal prose, it is sometimes necessary to quote text containing typos or other doubtful words. In such cases, the author will write "[sic]" to indicate that an error was in the original quoted source rather than in the transcription.

== Scribal errors ==
Scribal errors receive much attention in the context of textual criticism. Many of these mistakes are not specific to manuscripts and can be referred to as typos. Some classifications include homeoteleuton and homeoarchy (skipping a line due to the similarity of the ending or beginning), haplography (copying once what appeared twice), dittography (copying twice what appeared once), contamination (introduction of extraneous elements), metathesis (reversing the order of some elements), unwitting mistranscription of similar elements, mistaking similar looking letters, the substitution of homophones, fission and fusion (joining or separating words).

== Biblical errors ==
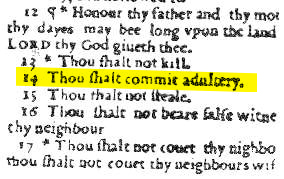
The Wicked Bible

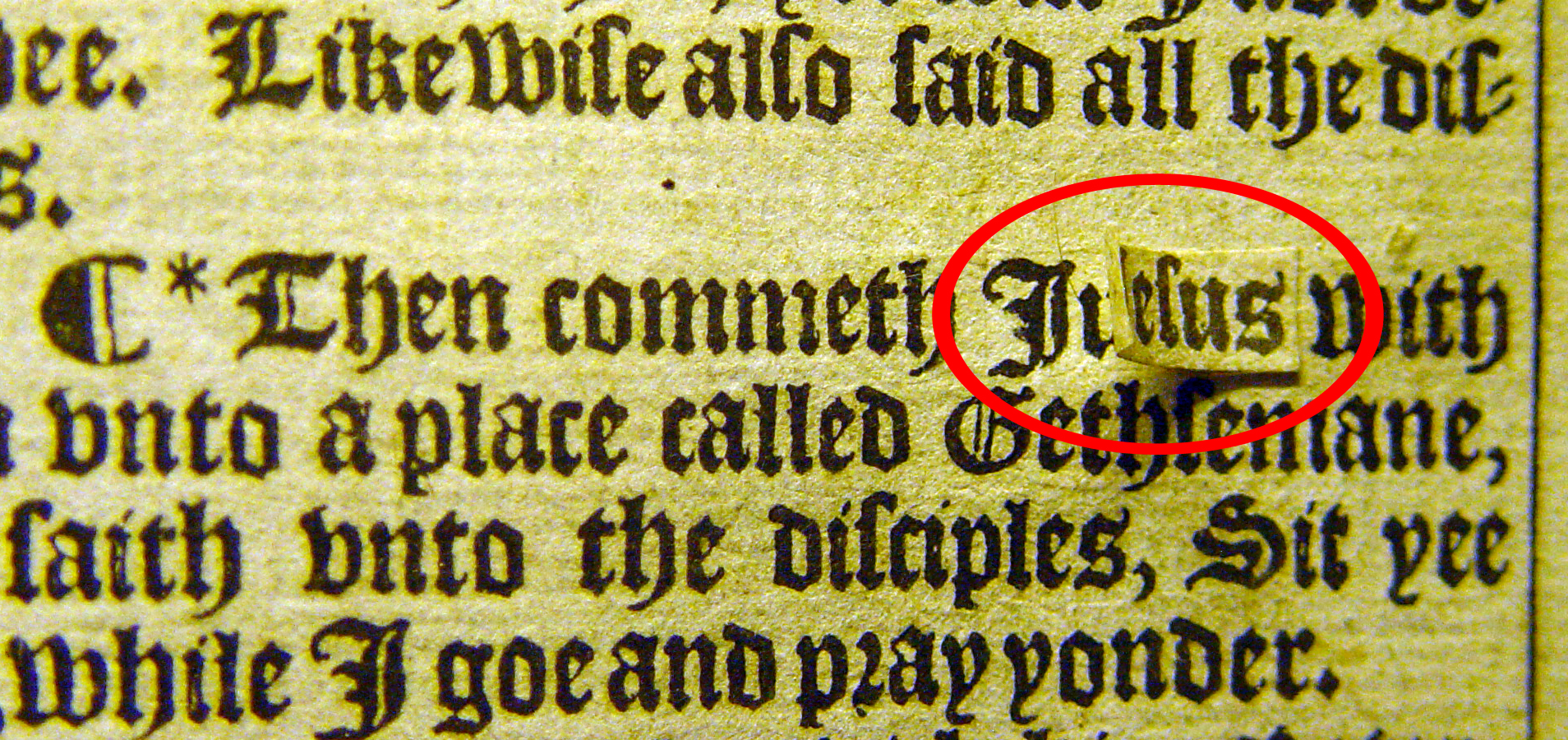
The Judas Bible in St. Mary's Church, Totnes, Devon, UK

The Wicked Bible omits the word "not" in the commandment, "thou shalt not commit adultery".

The Judas Bible is a copy of the second folio edition of the Authorized Version, printed by Robert Barker, printer to James VI and I, in 1613, and given to the church for the use of the Mayor of Totnes. This edition is known as the Judas Bible because in Matthew 26:36 "Judas" appears instead of "Jesus". In this copy, the mistake is corrected with a slip of paper pasted over the misprint.

== Intentional typos ==
Certain typos, or kinds of typos, have acquired widespread notoriety and are occasionally used deliberately for humorous purposes. For instance, the British newspaper The Guardian is sometimes referred to as The Grauniad due to its reputation for frequent typesetting errors in the era before computer typesetting. This usage began as a running joke in the satirical magazine Private Eye. The magazine continues to refer to The Guardian by this name.

Typos are common on social media, and some—such as "teh", "pwned", and "zomg"—have become in-jokes among Internet groups and subcultures. P0rn is not a typo but an example of obfuscation, where people make a word harder for filtering software to understand while retaining its meaning to human readers.

In mapping, it was common practice to include deliberate errors so that copyright theft could be identified.

In "The Influence of Science Fiction on Modern American Filk Music", an early 1950s essay by Lee Jacobs, 'filk' was an accidental typo for 'folk'. However, the typo came to be intentionally adopted for songs etc. associated with science fiction (see filk music).

=== Typosquatting ===
Typosquatting is a form of cybersquatting that relies on typographical errors made by users of the Internet. Typically, the cybersquatter will register a likely typo of a frequently-accessed website address in the hope of receiving traffic when internet users mistype that address into a web browser. Deliberately introducing typos into a web page, or into its metadata, can also draw unwitting visitors when they enter these typos in Internet search engines.

An example of this is gogole.com instead of google.com; the former of which could potentially be harmful to the user.

=== Typos in online auctions ===
Since the emergence and popularization of online auction sites such as eBay, misspelled auction searches have quickly become lucrative for people searching for deals. The concept on which these searches are based is that, if an individual posts an auction and misspells its description and/or title, regular searches will not find this auction. However, a search that includes misspelled alterations of the original search term in such a way as to create misspellings, transpositions, omissions, double strikes, and wrong key errors would find most misspelled auctions. The resulting effect is that there are far fewer bids than there would be under normal circumstances, allowing the searcher to obtain the item for less. A series of third-party websites have sprung up allowing people to find these items.

== Atomic typos ==
Another kind of typo—informally called an "atomic typo"—is a typo that happens to result in a correctly spelled word that is different from the intended one. Since it is spelled correctly, a simple spellchecker cannot find the mistake. The term was used at least as early as 1995 by Robert Terry.

A few illustrative examples include:

- "now" instead of "not",
- "unclear" instead of "nuclear"
- "you" instead of "your"
- "Sudan" instead of "Sedan" (leading to a diplomatic incident in 2005 between Sudan and the United States regarding a nuclear test code-named Sedan)
- "Untied States" instead of "United States"
- "the" instead of "they"

and many more. For any of these, the converse is also true.

== See also ==
- Clerical error – Mistake in clerical work, e.g. data entry
- Errata – Correction of a published text
- Fat-finger error – Keyboard input error
- Human error – Action with unintended consequences
- Obelism – Editors' marks on manuscripts
  - Obelus – Historical annotation mark or symbol
- Orthography – Set of conventions for written language
- Scrivener's error – Clerical error in a legal document
- Titivillus – Demon who introduces errors into texts
- Transcription error – Data entry error
- Typography – the art and technique of arranging type to make written language legible, readable and appealing when displayed. Typographers design pages; traditionally, typesetters "set" the type to accord with that design.
