= Raunioissa =

Studio album by Sotajumala
- Released: January 16, 2015
- Genre: Death metal
- Length: 40:21
- Label: Sotajumala-Yhtiöt

Sotajumala chronology
Kuolemanpalvelus (2010)	Raunioissa (2015)

Raunioissa (English: In the ruins) is the fourth studio album by the Finnish death metal band Sotajumala. It entered the Finnish billboard charts at position 4 on its release week.

No.	Title
1.	Saattajat (The Vessels)
2.	Sinä et ole yhtään mitään (You Are Less Than Nothing)
3.	Uhrina sairaan (The Prey of a Sick Mind)
4.	Veljen viha (A Brother's Wrath)
5.	Kuolemanmarssi (Death March)
6.	Elävänä omassa haudassaan (Alive in a Grave)
7.	Riimit lihan säälistä (Rhymes of the Pity for Flesh)
8.	Päivä jolloin aurinko sammui (The Day the Sun Perished)
