= Blind Date with Violence =

Studio album by The Scourger
- Released: January 4, 2006
- Recorded: 2005
- Genre: Thrash metal
- Length: 38:50
- Label: Cyclone Records
- Producer: Aaro Seppovaara

The Scourger chronology
To the Slayground (2005)	Blind Date with Violence (2006)	Dark Invitation to Armageddon (2008)

International cover
- The cover used for the international version.

Blind Date with Violence is the debut album by thrash metal band The Scourger. It was released on January 4, 2006 and later re-released as an international version with bonus tracks on October 6, 2006 via Cyclone Records. Two of the album's singles landed on the national Finnish charts: "Hatehead" at #1 in July 2005, and "Maximum Intensity" at #3 the following year, climbing to #2 one week later.

== Track listing ==
1. "Decline of Conformity / Grading: Deranged" – 5:52
2. "Hatehead" – 3:32
3. "Maximum Intensity" - 3:43
4. "Enslaved to Faith" – 3:16
5. "The Oath & the Lie" – 3:18
6. "Chapter Thirteen" – 4:58
7. "Pain Zone" - 4:53
8. "Exodus Day" – 4:30
9. "Feast of the Carnivore" – 4:48
10. "Ghosts of War" (Slayer cover) – 3:48
11. "Over the Wall" (Testament cover) – 4:14
12. "The Greediness" – 5:28
13. "Black Worms" – 6:05
14. "Grading: Deranged [Live]" – 5:04
15. "Maximum Intensity [Live]" – 3:41
16. "The Oath & the Lie [Live]" – 3:32
- Tracks 10–16 are bonus tracks from the international version.

== Credits ==
- Jari Hurskainen – vocals
- Seppo Tarvainen – drums
- Jani Luttinen – guitars
- Timo Nyberg – guitars
- Kimmo Kammonen – bass
- Aaro Seppovaara – producing, engineering, mixing
- Petri Majuri – mastering
