= Panssarikolonna MCD =

Studio album by Sotajumala
- Released: 2003
- Recorded: Studio Watercastle, 2002.
- Label: Woodcut Records
- Producer: Juha Saikkonen

Professional ratings
Review scores
Source	Rating
Imperiumi	8/10

Panssarikolonna MCD is an album by Sotajumala.

== Track listing ==
1. Panssarikolonna (PANZERDIVISION)
2. Sodan Kauhu (HORRORS OF WAR)
3. Nimettömäksi Jäänyt (LEFT UNNAMED)
4. Verimaa, Isänmaa (BLOODLAND, FATHERLAND)
