= Burned Down the Enemy =

Studio album by Burning Point
- Released: 20 December 2006
- Recorded: Helgate Studios; Oulu, Finland
- Genre: Heavy metal
- Length: 57:51
- Label: Soundholic, Metal Heaven

Burning Point chronology
| Feeding the Flames (2003) | Burned Down the Enemy (2006) | Empyre (2009) |

Burned Down the Enemy is the third album of heavy metal band Burning Point. The album was released in Asia by Soundholic on 20 December 2006 and in Europe on 19 January 2007 by Metal Heaven.

It was recorded at Helgate studios in Oulu by Jukka Jokikokko. Mixing was made in Tonebox studios by Kakke Vähäkuopus. Album was mastered in Finnvox studios by Minerva Pappi.

== Track listing ==
1. Parasite
2. Heart Of Gold
3. Dawn Of The Ancient War
4. Hell Awaits
5. From The Beginning Of It All
6. Icebound
7. Deceiver
8. Eye For An Eye
9. To Hell And Back
10. Against The Madness Of Time
11. Burned Down The Enemy
12. My Reign, My Fire (bonus track)
13. Heart Of Gold - Demo Version (bonus track)
14. The Road To Hell (bonus track)
15. Nocturnal Sight (bonus track)
16. Bring Me Oblivion (bonus track)
