= Sotajumala =

Finnish death metal band

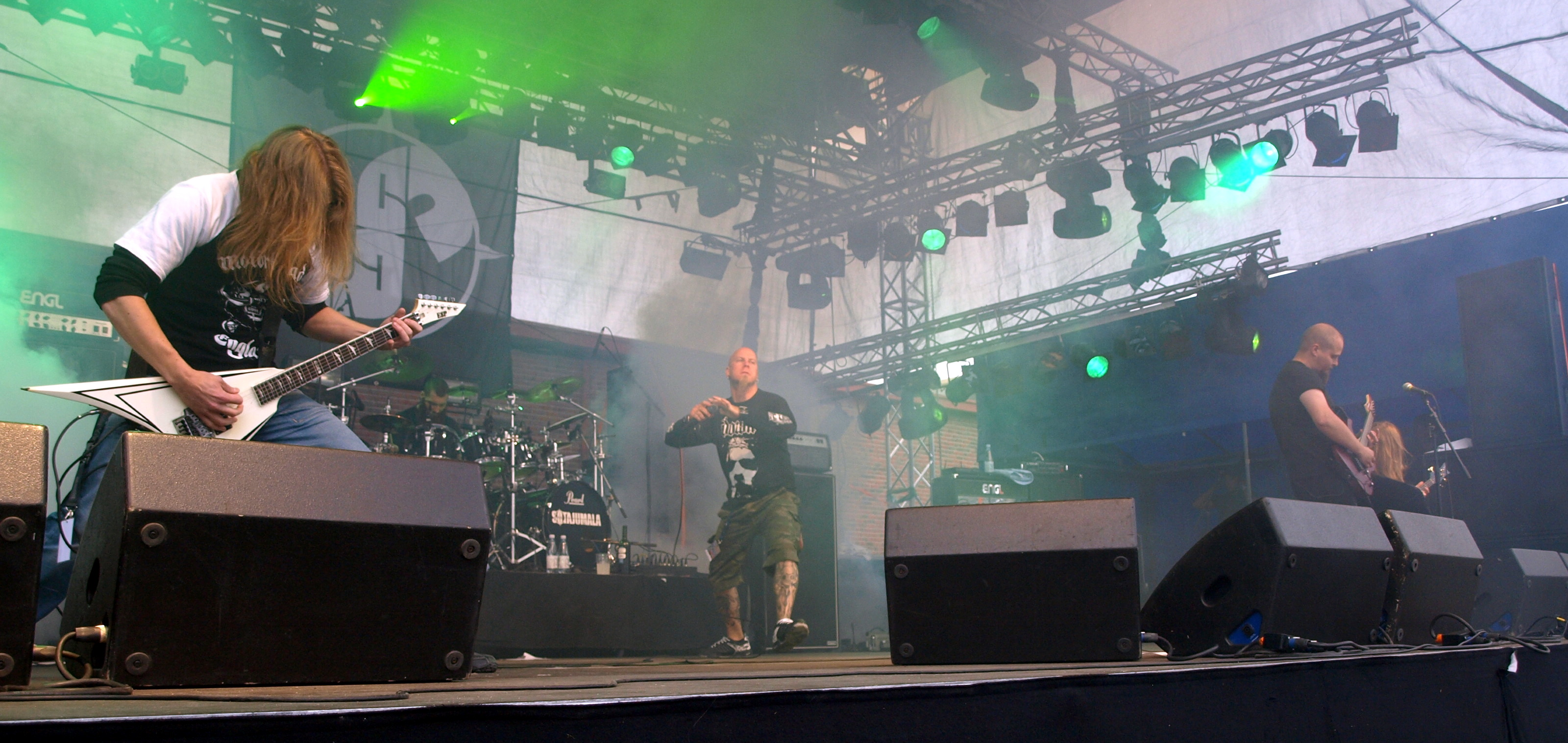
- At Jalometalli 2008 in Oulu

Background information
- Origin: Jyväskylä, Finland
- Genre: Death metal
- Years active: 1998–2016
- Label: Cobra Records
- Members: Mynni Luukkainen - vocals Kosti Orbinski - guitar Pete Lapio - guitar Tomi Otsala - bass, backing vocals Timo Häkkinen - drums
- Past members: Harri Lastu; Arttu Romo; Jyrki Häkkinen; 105 (Teijo Hakkola)
- Website: www.sotajumala.com

Sotajumala (Finnish: "Wargod") was a Finnish death metal band from Jyväskylä, formed in 1998. The band has released four albums, two maxi singles, one single and one split EP (with Torture Killer). They have played many shows in their home country, including Tuska, Jalometalli, Nummirock, Lutakko Liekeissä and Pellavarock festivals. In Finland, the band has toured with Nile, Misery Index and Grave as well as supported Obituary, Napalm Death and Vader at one-off shows. The band split-up in 2016.

== History ==
Sotajumala was started by Tomi Otsala and Kosti Orbinski in 1998. In 2000, Arttu Romo, Pete Lapio, Jyrki Häkkinen and Harri Lastu joined the band, completing its first full line-up. In September 2001, the band recorded their first release, Sotajumala, which led to Woodcut Records signing the band. Guitarist Pete Lapio left the band shortly after. Singer Harri Lastu also left in the late summer of 2002, due to personal issues and was replaced with '105' (Teijo Hakkola).

During fall 2002, the band entered Watercastle Studio to record four new songs released in early 2003 as Panssarikolonna. Drummer Arttu Romo and guitarist Jyrki Häkkinen left the band after the release and session drummer Timo Häkkinen was hired to play on the debut album, recorded in the fall. Ex-guitarist Pete Lapio rejoined the band during the summer.

Death Metal Finland, the band's debut album was recorded in September 2003 at Sam's Workshop in Jyväskylä. After its release in March 2004, the band played a short Scandinavian tour with Rotten Sound and Defleshed with another session drummer, Sami Järvinen. In June 2003, the band played Nummirock festival with bands such as Morbid Angel and Rotten Sound. Timo Häkkinen joined the band full-time in August, and singer Teijo Hakkola was fired. Session singer Mynni Luukkainen joined and the band continued playing shows. In spring 2005, Sotajumala played in Estonia and also did a three show mini-tour in Finland with Grave.

Two new songs were recorded in July 2005, to be released as a split with Torture Killer that October. After these sessions, Mynni Luukkainen joined the band full time. The split CD entered the Finnish single charts at position 10. In August, the band played at Jalometalli Metal Music Festival in Oulu.

Sotajumala entered the studio in late summer 2007 to record their sophomore album, Teloitus, released in October 2007. Teloitus entered the Finnish album charts at position 17. This was the band's last album for Woodcut Records.

To support Teloitus, Sotajumala played many shows in Finland, including a four show mini-tour with Nile and Deathchain (December 2007), Finnish Metal Expo (February 2008), Tuska Open Air Metal Festival (June 2008), Pellavarock and Jalometalli Metal Music Festival (August 2008) as well as numerous shows with local bands. They supported Obituary in August at Nosturi.

As of December 2008, the band was writing a new album and announced that they would try not to play any shows before the album was completed. They performed at Jalometalli Winterfest in February supporting Napalm Death in February 2009. Their third album, Kuolemanpalvelus, was released on 26 May 2010.

== Musical style ==
Musically, the band tends to lean toward the Cannibal Corpse/Florida style of death metal. Lyrical themes revolve around the military history of Finland and war stories in general. The band stresses, "Though the lyrics have their roots in war, they are not meant to provoke or create an image of fascist beliefs. So, Sotajumala does not take any stand with our lyrics to political or other ideologies."

== Members ==
=== Final Members ===
- Tomi Otsala - bass, backing vocals (1998-2016)
- Kosti Orbinski - guitar (1998-2016)
- Pete Lapio - guitar (2000-2002, 2003-2016)
- Timo Häkkinen - drums (2004-2016)
- Mynni Luukkainen - vocals (2005-2016)

=== Former Members ===
- Harri Lastu - vocals (2000-2002)
- Arttu Romo - drums (2000-2003)
- Jyrki Häkkinen - guitar (2001-2003)
- Teijo "105" Hakkola - vocals (2002-2004)

Timeline

== Discography ==
- Sotajumala - 2002 mcd
- Panssarikolonna - 2003 mcd
- Death Metal Finland - 2004 CD
- Sotajumala / Torture Killer split - 2005 CD single and 7" vinyl
- Kuolinjulistus - 2007 CD single
- Teloitus - 2007 CD
- Death Metal Finland Special Edition - 2008 double CD
- Kuolemanpalvelus - 2010
- Raunioissa - 2015
