= Dark Invitation to Armageddon =

Studio album by The Scourger
- Released: January 30, 2008
- Recorded: 2007
- Genre: Thrash metal
- Length: 51:58
- Label: Cyclone Records
- Producer: Aaro Seppovaara

The Scourger chronology
Blind Date with Violence (2006)	Dark Invitation to Armageddon (2008)

Dark Invitation to Armageddon is the second album by thrash metal band The Scourger. It was released on January 30, 2008, and later re-released as an international version with bonus tracks on March 14, 2008, via Cyclone Records. The album's first single, "Never Bury the Hatchet", landed on the national Finnish charts at #9 in July 2007.

== Track listing ==
1. "Lex Talionis" (Ari Tarvainen) – 1:26
2. "No Redemption" (Ariane Gottberg, Hurskainen, Tarvainen) – 4:40
3. "In the Hour of Ruin" (Gottberg, Tarvainen) – 5:57
4. "To Tame a Life" (Gottberg, Hurskainen, Tarvainen) – 4:37
5. "Never Bury the Hatchet" (Gottberg, Tarvainen) – 4:02
6. "Deformed Reality" (Gottberg, Hurskainen, Tarvainen) – 4:28
7. "Dark Invitation to Armageddon" (Gottberg, Hurskainen, Tarvainen) – 5:18
8. "Reign in Bestial Sin" (Gottberg, Hurskainen, Tarvainen) – 5:25
9. "Beyond Judas" (Gottberg, Hurskainen, Tarvainen) – 5:01
10. "Cranium Crush" (Gottberg, Luttinen, Tarvainen) – 4:17
11. "Last Nail to the Coffin" (Gottberg, Hurskainen, Tarvainen) – 6:47
12. "Vicious Circle" () – 4:15
13. "Hatehead [Live]" () – 3:35
- Tracks 12 and 13 are bonus tracks from the international version.

== Personnel ==
- Jari Hurskainen – vocals
- Seppo Tarvainen – drums
- Jani Luttinen – guitars
- Antti Wirman – guitars
- Kimmo Kammonen – bass
- Aaro Seppovaara – producing, engineering, mixing, mastering
- Petri Majuri – mastering
