= Robert Barker (printer) =

English bookseller and printer in London

- Died: 1643
- Occupation: Printer
- Era: Union of the Crowns
- Employer: James I of England
- Known for: King James Bible
- Notable work: Wicked Bible
- Criminal charge: Controversies surrounding the Wicked Bible
- Father: Christopher Barker

Robert Barker (died 1643) was a printer to James I of England and son of Christopher Barker, who had been printer to Queen Elizabeth I. He was most notably the printer of the King James Bible, one of the most influential and important books ever printed in the English language. He and co-publisher Martin Lucas published the infamous "Wicked Bible", which contained a typographical error omitting the word not from the sentence Thou shalt not commit adultery.

== Printing career ==
After working in the printing business for some time, Barker began working with his father's printing company in 1589 and inherited the printing house on 29 November 1599 upon his father's death. Much of his printing work was of an official nature, including prayer books, scriptures, and law books.

=== King James Bible ===
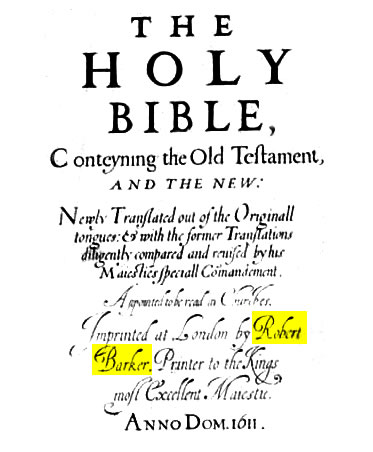
Reproduction of part of the title-page of the first edition of the King James Bible highlighting Robert Barker

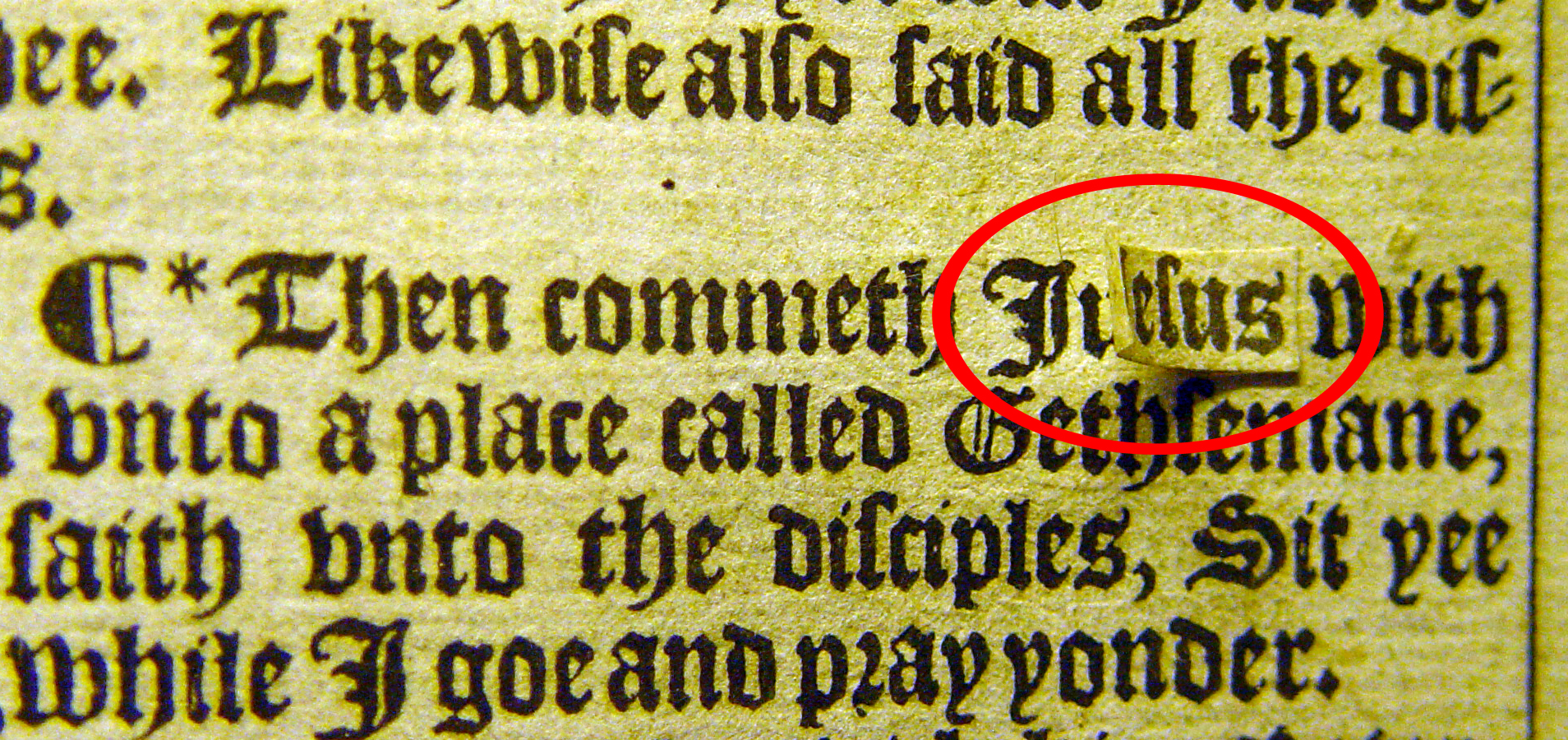
The 'Judas' Bible in St Mary's Church, Totnes, Devon, England. This is a copy of the second folio edition of the Authorized Version, printed by Robert Barker in 1613, and given to the church for the use of the Mayor of Totnes. This edition is known as the 'Judas' Bible because in Matthew 26:36 'Judas' appears instead of 'Jesus'. In this copy the mistake (in red circle) has been corrected by a slip of paper pasted over the misprint.

In 1611, Robert Barker printed the first edition of the King James Bible. Although it was called "Authorized" it was not actually "authorized" by the king, who did take some interest in the work; the entire cost of the printing was undertaken by Barker who ultimately gained little financial reward but some fame for the work. The printing itself was substandard with uneven printing lines, the blackletter typeface used was considered of poor quality, and it contained many mistakes which were corrected in subsequent printings.

=== The Wicked Bible ===
The Wicked Bible, also known as "The Adulterous Bible" or "The Sinners' Bible", was published in 1631 by Robert Barker and Martin Lucas, both royal printers in London, and was intended to be a word-for-word reprint of the King James Bible. However, in the Ten Commandments (Exodus 20:14) the word "not" in the sentence "Thou shalt not commit adultery" was omitted. About a year later, Barker and Lucas were fined £300 (roughly equivalent to 33,800 pounds today) and were deprived of their printer's licences. The fact that this edition of the Bible contained such a flagrant mistake outraged Charles I of England and George Abbot, the Archbishop of Canterbury, who said then:

"I knew the tyme when great care was had about printing, the Bibles especially, good compositors and the best correctors were gotten being grave and learned men, the paper and the letter rare, and faire every way of the beste, but now the paper is nought, the composers boyes, and the correctors unlearned.

— George Abbot

By order of the king, the authors were called to the Star Chamber, where, upon the fact being proved, the whole impression was called in, and they were fined. The majority of copies of the Wicked Bible were immediately cancelled and burned, and it is rumoured that only eleven survive.

== Imprisonment ==
In 1635, Barker was imprisoned. In spite of working on what should have been very lucrative business, Robert was not a good businessman and it may well have been this lack of experience and desperation that led him into trouble with the law, not to mention the controversy surrounding the Wicked Bible and resultant fine. Barker never profited from his history-making enterprise: he died in debtors' prison in 1643.
