= Fall of the Idols =

Finnish doom metal band

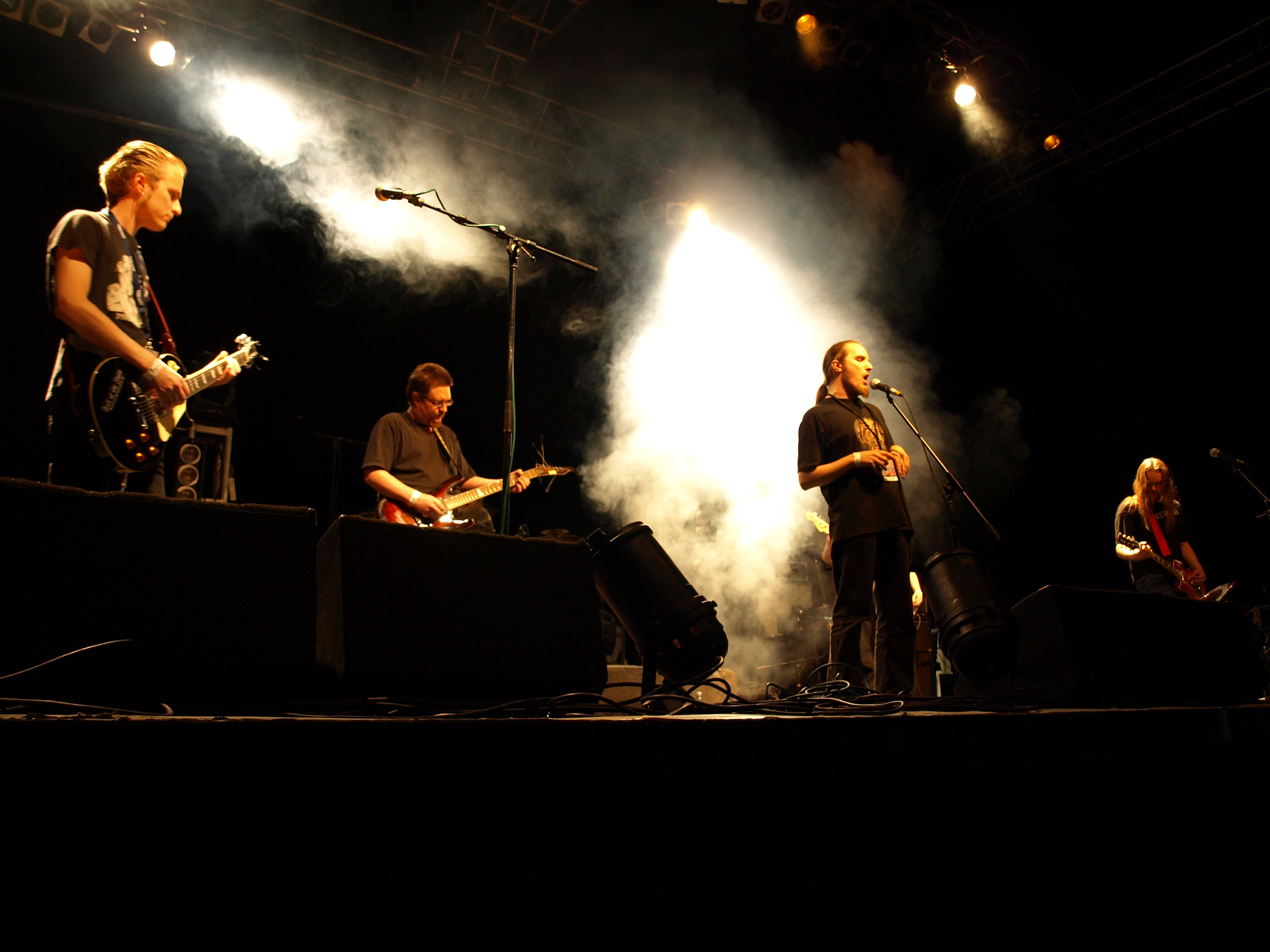

Background information
- Origin: Tornio, Finland
- Genres: Doom metal
- Years active: 2000–present
- Labels: I Hate
- Members: Jyrki Hakomäki; Vesa Karppinen; Rami Moilanen; Jouni Sihvonen
- Past members: Panu Paunonen; Hannu Weckman; Tommi Turunen

Fall of the Idols is a doom metal band from Tornio, Finland, established in 2000. The band's first full-length album, entitled The Womb of the Earth, was released in July 2006 on I Hate Records. The second album The Séance was released in April 2008. Both albums artwork has been designed by Albert Witchfinder of Reverend Bizarre.

The band's music can be described as a combination of Cathedral, Candlemass and The Doors with vocalist Jyrki Hakomäki's vocals ranging from Jim Morrison-esque crooning to manic screams whilst the band's musical arrangements combine traditional slow doom metal riffing to sweeping epic melodies.

Drummer Hannu Weckman died in June 2011, at the age of 28, while the band was recording their third album. Despite this, the band continued to finish the album, Solemn Verses. In September 2018, the band announced that they will start to perform live again, starting with a performance in Oulu, Finland in late November 2018. In late 2022 I Hate Records released the bands fourth album, Contradictory Notes. Band members Vesa Karppinen, Rami Moilanen and Jyrki Hakomäki, along with live guitarist Ari Rajaniemi, are also playing in a heavy/doom metal band Wolfshead, which was formed by Karppinen and Rajaniemi in 2011.

== Line-up ==
=== Current line-up ===
- Jyrki Hakomäki - vocals (2002, 2004 -) also drums (2000–2004, 2013-)
- Vesa Karppinen - bass (2000 -)
- Rami Moilanen - guitar (2002 -)
- Jouni Sihvonen - guitar (2004 -)

=== Live musicians ===
- Ari Rajaniemi - guitar (2018 -)
- Tero Konola - drums (2018 -)

=== Former members ===
- Panu Paunonen - vocals (2003–2004)
- Hannu Weckman - drums (2005–2011, died in June 2011)
- Tommi Turunen - guitar (2000-2018)

== Discography ==
=== Demos/EPs ===
- Demo2002 (demo, 2002)
- Fall of the Idols (EP, 2004)
- Agonies Be Thy Children (demo, 2005)
- The Pathway (demo, 2005)

=== Albums ===
- The Womb of the Earth (I Hate Records, 2006)
- The Séance (I Hate Records, 2008)
- Solemn Verses (I Hate Records, 2012)
- Contradictory Notes (I Hate Records, 2022)

=== Splits ===
- Spiritus Mortis/Fall of the Idols (I Hate Records, 2009)
- Tales of Doom and Woe; split with Forsaken (I Hate Records, 2010)

=== Compilations ===
- Ascension: 2001-2007 (Ghouls Nite Out, 2010)
