= Hellbox =

Bin for cast metal sorts after printing

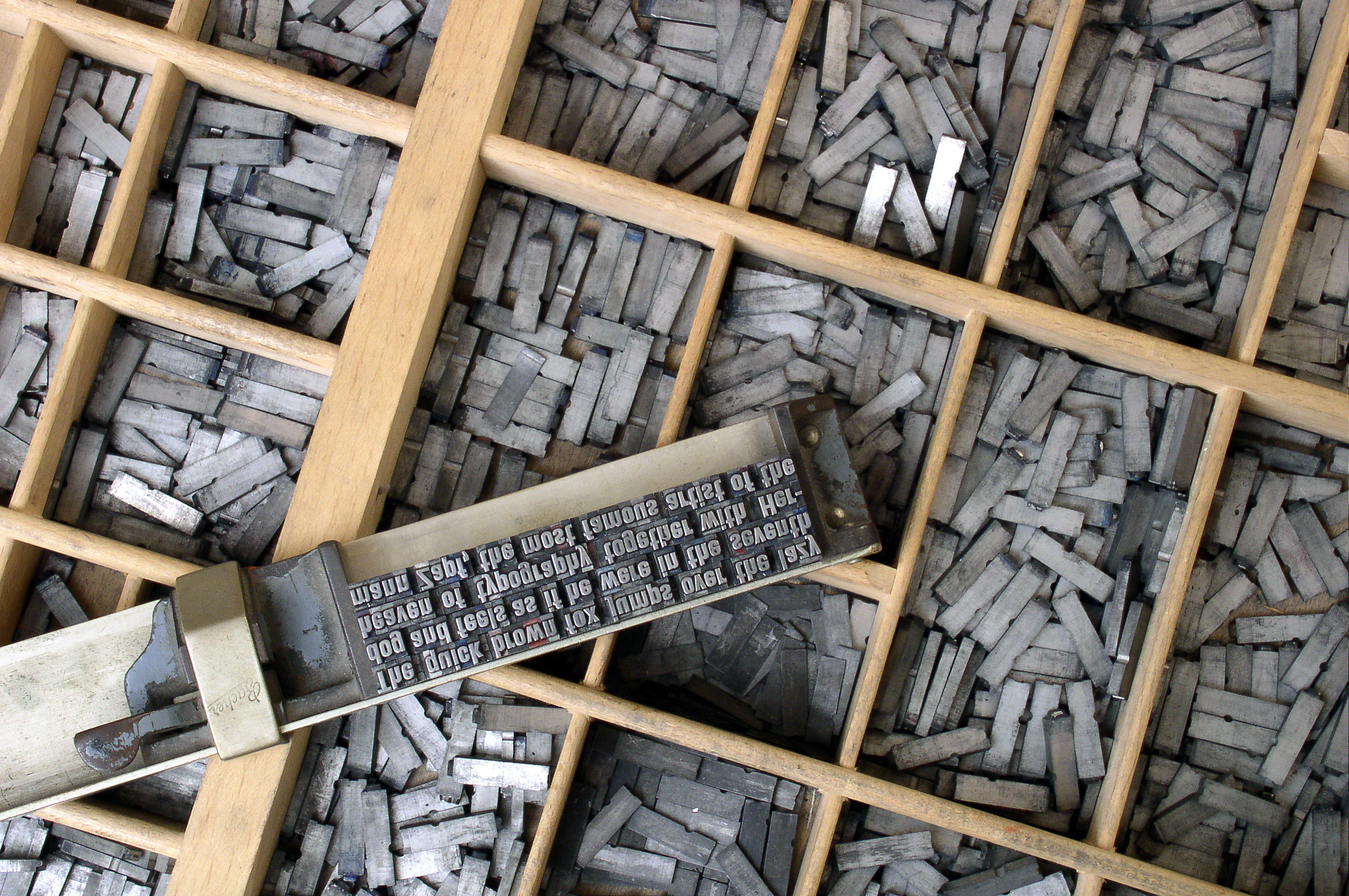
Movable type on a composing stick on a type drawer.

A hellbox is a receptacle where cast metal sorts are thrown after printing. The job of sorting the type from the hellbox and putting it back into the job case was given to the apprentice, known as a printer's devil. Later, when continuous casting or hot metal typesetting machines such as the Linotype and Monotype became popular, the hellbox was used for storing discarded or broken types that were melted down and recast.

Hellbox is also a font proofing application for macOS.
