= Burning Point =

Finnish power metal/heavy metal band

- Origin: Oulu, Finland
- Genres: Power metal, heavy metal
- Years active: 1999–present
- Labels: Poison Arrow Records, Limb, SPV GmbH, Soundholic, Metal Heaven, Scarlet Records, AFM Records
- Members: Luca Sturniolo; Pete Ahonen; Pekka Kolivuori; Jarkko Poussu; Tuomas Jaatinen; Matti Halonen
- Past members: Pasi Hiltula; Jukka Kyrö; Toni Kansanoja; Jari Kaiponen; Nitte Valo; Jarkko Väisänen; Sami Nyman; Jussi Ontero
- Website: www.facebook.com/burningpointfinland

Burning Point is a Finnish power metal / heavy metal band, founded in 1999.

== History ==
The band was founded in 1999 in Oulu, Finland, by bassist Jukka kyrö and guitarist Pete Ahonen.

In 2016 the band added vocalist Nitte Valo, formerly of the band Battle Beast. Valo started collaborating with the group in 2013 when guitarist Pete Ahonen asked her to collaborate on a few of the band's songs, and eventually asked her to join full-time as singer after he stepped down as vocalist.

== Personnel ==
=== Current members ===
- Luca Sturniolo – Vocals
- Pete Ahonen – Guitars
- Pekka Kolivuori – Guitars
- Tuomas Jaatinen – Drums
- Jarkko Poussu – Bass
- Matti Halonen – Keyboards

=== Former members ===
- Jukka Jokikokko – Bass
- Pasi Hiltula – Keyboards (see Eternal Tears of Sorrow, Kalmah)
- Jukka Kyrö – Guitar
- Toni Kansanoja – Bass
- Jari Kaiponen – Drums
- Jarkko Väisänen – Keyboards
- Nitte Valo – Vocals
- Jussi Ontero – Drums
- Sami Nyman – Bass

== Discography ==
=== Albums ===
- Salvation by Fire (2001)
- Feeding the Flames (2003)
- Burned Down the Enemy (2006)
- Empyre (2009)
- The Ignitor (2012)
- Burning Point (2015)
- The Blaze (2016)
- Arsonist of the Soul (2021)

=== Singles ===
- To Hell and Back (CD-single 2004 on Poison Arrow Records)
