= Thyrane =

Finnish black metal band

Thyrane is a Finnish black metal band from Kemi. They were signed to Spikefarm Records for the majority of their releases and disbanded in 2006, but reformed again in 2015 with a partially different line-up.

Thyrane was formed by Blastmor in 1994 when he and two other musicians began playing together. After going through several line-up changes, Blastmor found guitarist Daemon and bass guitar player R. Grönholm in 1996. In 1997, a second guitarist, Avather, joined the band. They recorded their "Black Harmony" demo in Tico-Tico Studio. Woodcut Records were interested. Thyrane's first full-length album, Symphones Of Infernality, was released in 1999. R Grönholm left because of personal reasons, forcing Daemon to play bass guitar, and Blastmor to play lead guitar as well as the vocals. One year later, Spikefarm Records signed Thyrane and they recorded their second full-length album The Spirit Of Rebellion.

The Spirit Of Rebellion received very positive reviews. Spikefarm Records then re-released "Black Harmony" in conjunction with The Dead Beginners' MCD. After the release, Thyrane toured France, Germany, Holland, Italy, Croatia, Austria, Switzerland and Hungary with Ancient and Stormlord.

Hypnotic was released in 2003. The band took a different turn with this album. Instead of playing the speedy, aggressive black metal packed full of double-kick drumming, they moved briefly into the industrial metal circle. With their last CD, Travesty of Heavenly Essence, they returned to their previous style with just a slight industrial metal influence.

On 28 January 2022, Thyrane announced they are working on a new album and shared live footage of their Steelchaos 2020 show on their facebook page.

"Hark! Several people have asked us when it's time for a new Thyrane album. Rest assured, we are equally eager to release it as soon it's finished. We are fired up to do the devil's work in the form of the most demonic and furious Thyrane ever, spiced up with national romantic soundscapes from the early days of Scandinavian black metal. Most of the material is ready but still a lot of work remains to be done."

== Discography ==
- "Black Harmony" - MCD (1998)
- Symphonies of Infernality - CD (1999)
- "Black Harmony"/"The Dead Beginners" - Split CD (2000)
- The Spirit of Rebellion - CD (2000)
- Hypnotic - CD (2003)
- Travesty of Heavenly Essence - CD (2005)
