= Death Metal Finland =

Studio album by Sotajumala
- Released: 2003
- Recorded: August 19–September 14, 2003
- Genre: Death metal
- Label: Woodcut
- Producer: Juha Saikkonen

Death Metal Finland is the debut from Finnish death metal band Sotajumala. It was released on Woodcut Records in 2004. The songs are mostly written (in Finnish) by the instrumentalists themselves (much as in the case of Cannibal Corpse, one of their avowed influences), as vocalist 105 (aka Teijo Hakkola) only figures into the songwriting on one track.

== Track listing ==
- All Songs Arranged By Sotajumala.
1. Intro 0:52
2. Meidän Maa (Our Land) (Jyri Haakinen, Kosti Orbinski, Tomi "Aake" Otsala) 2:50
3. Elämän Vihollinen (Enemy of Life) (Hakkinen, Orbinski, Otsala, "Suhonen") 3:38
4. Syyttömien Veri (Blood of the Innocent) (Orbinski, Otsala) 2:42
5. Kuolleet (The Dead) (Arttu Romo, Orbinski, Otsala) 4:49
6. Rakkaudesta Sotaan (For the Love of War) (Orbinski, Otsala, Teijo Hakkola) 1:52
7. Panssarikolonna (Panzer Division) (Hakkinen, Orbinski, Otsala, Romo) 2:15
8. Sisu Sinivalkoinen (Blue-and-White Strength) (Hakkinen, Orbinski, Otsala, Pete Lapio) 2:45
9. Sotajumala (Wargod) (Orbinski, Otsala, Romo) 2:09
10. Vanki (The Prisoner) (Orbinski, Otsala, Romo) 3:59
11. Pommitus (Air Raid) (Orbinski, Otsala, Romo) 5:38

== Personnel ==
=== Sotajumala ===
- 105 (a.k.a. Teijo Hakkola): Vocals
- Kosti Orbinski: Lead & Rhythm Guitars
- Pete Lapio: Lead & Rhythm Guitars
- Tomi Otsala: Bass
- Timo Hakkinen: Drums

=== Additional musicians ===
- Simo "Slayer" Rahikainen: Guest Lead on "Kuolleet"
- Sami Kokko: Guest Vocals on "Pommitus"

== Production ==
- Produced By Juha Saikkonen
- Recorded, Engineered & Mixed By Sami Kokko (Sam's Workshop, Jyväskylä)
- Mastered By Mika Jussila (Finnvox Studios, Helsinki)
