= Wicked Bible =

1631 edition of the King James Bible

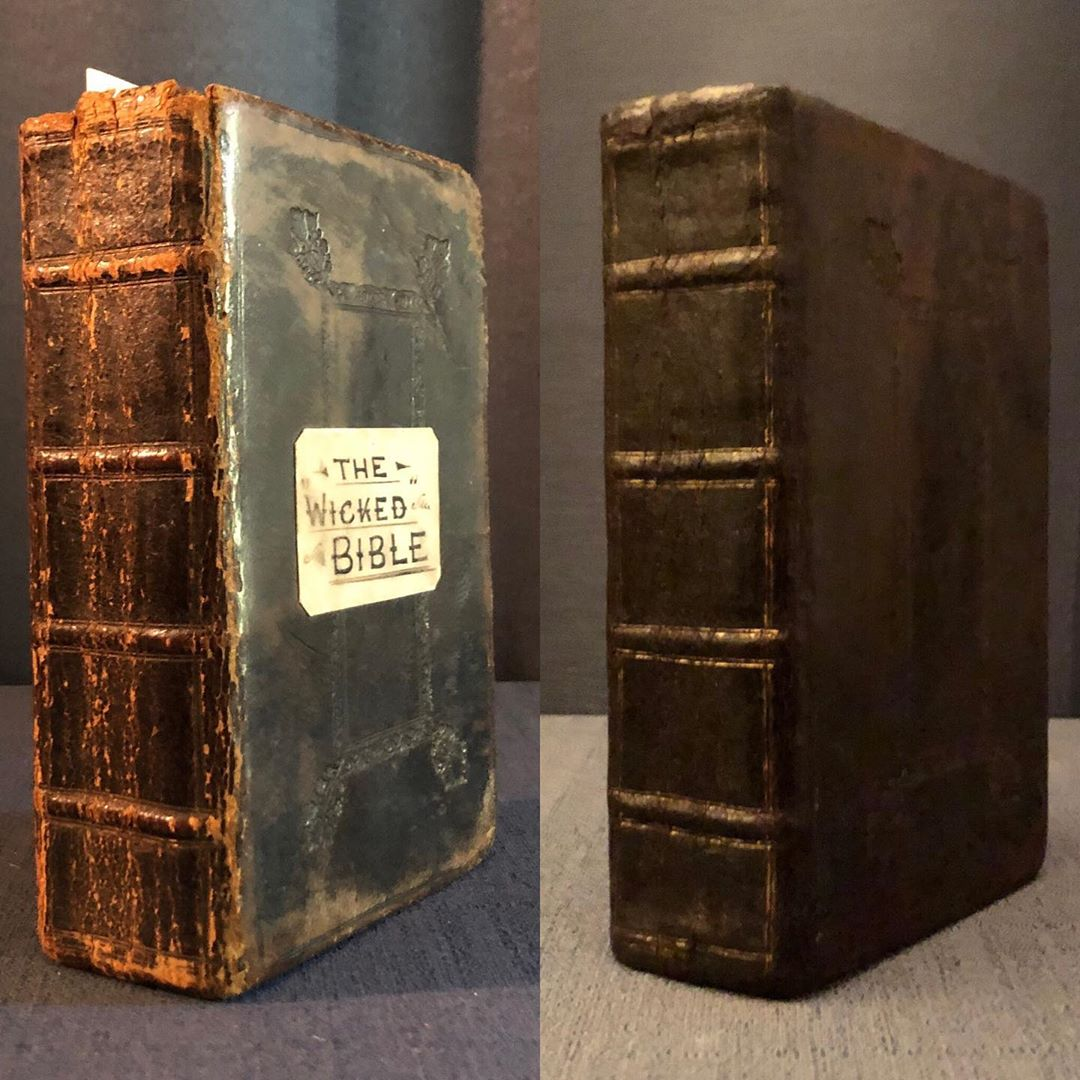
- An edition of the Wicked Bible
- Original title: The Holy Bible
- Language: English
- Publisher: Robert Barker and Martin Lucas
- Publication date: 1631
- Publication place: England
- Media type: Print

The Wicked Bible, sometimes called the Adulterous Bible or the Sinners' Bible, is an edition of the Bible meant to be a reprint of the King James Bible, published in 1631 by London royal printers Robert Barker and Martin Lucas. The name is derived from a mistake made by the compositors: in the Ten Commandments in Exodus 20:14, the word "not" was omitted from the sentence "Thou shalt not commit adultery". It is the most prominent example of Bible errata, which are often absent negatives that completely reverse the scriptural meaning.

== Errors ==
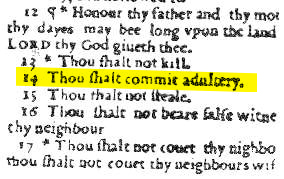
Wicked Bible (1631 KJV) Exodus 20, with the typographical error highlighted

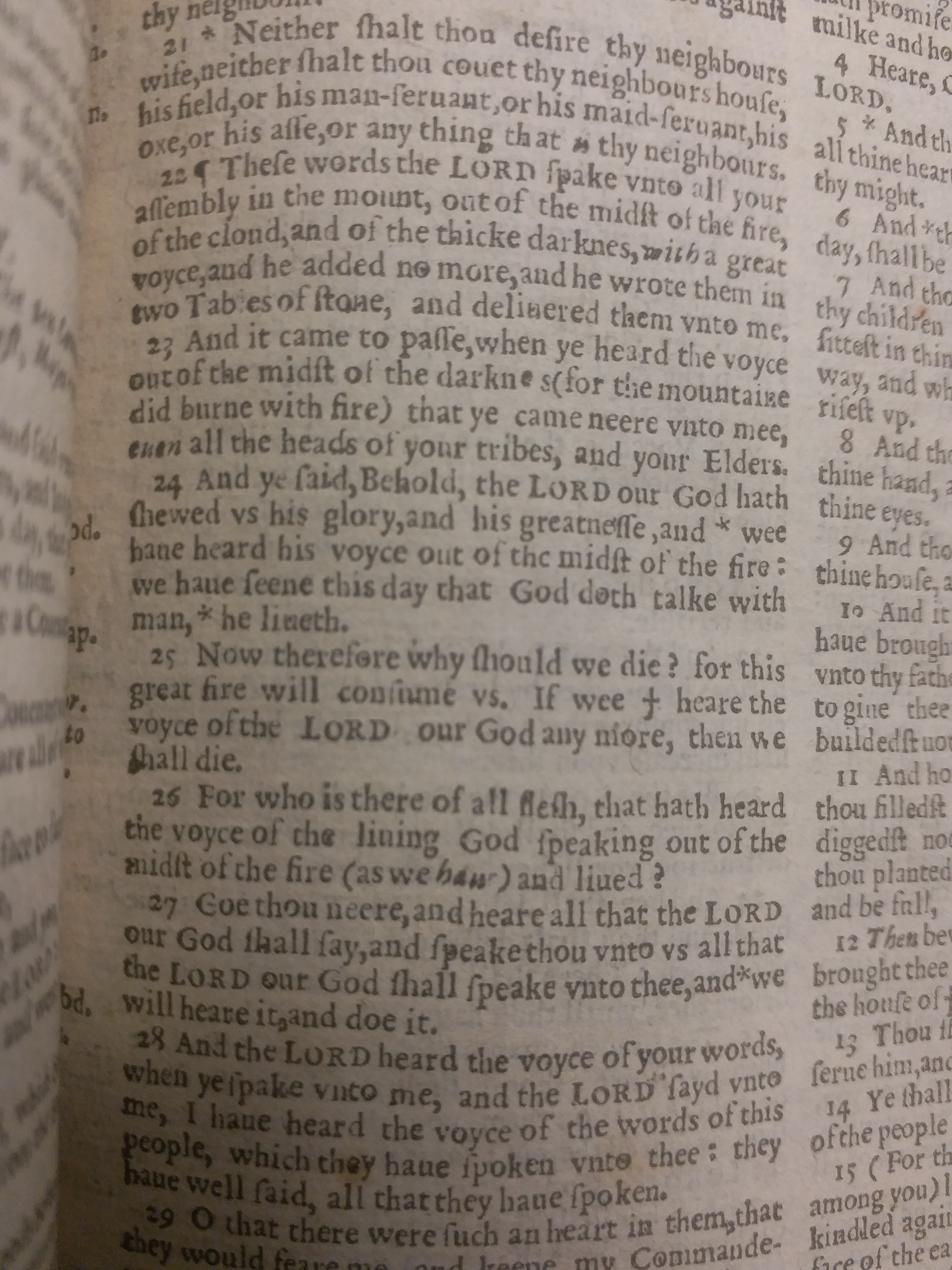
A picture of the Deuteronomy 5:24 passage in the University of Cambridge copy of the Wicked Bible (201.C31.6) showing no misprint

The Wicked Bible is best known for the omission of the word "not" in the sentence "Thou shalt not commit adultery" (Exodus 20:14), thus changing the sentence into "Thou shalt commit adultery".

The 1886 Reports of Cases in the Courts of Star Chamber and High Commission (which gives the Bodleian Library manuscript Rawlinson A 128 as its source) lists this as one of the "two grossest errors", among "divers other faults". The other is a misprint appearing in Deuteronomy 5:24; the word "greatness" appears as "great-asse", leading to a sentence reading: "Behold, the LORD our God hath shewed us his glory and his great-asse".

Gordon Campbell reports that in at least three of the surviving copies there is an inkblot where the missing "n" would be, suggesting such a mistake may have been covered up in these copies. He also notes that, at the time of the Wicked Bible's publication, the word "asse" only had the sense of "donkey". A copy of the bible in which the error is not concealed by an ink blot exists in the collection of the Dunham Bible Museum on the campus of the Houston Christian University, Texas.

Diana Severance, director of the Dunham Bible Museum at the Houston Baptist University, and Gordon Campbell have suggested that the second error could indicate that someone (possibly a rival printer) purposely sabotaged the printing of the Wicked Bible so that Robert Barker and Martin Lucas would lose their exclusive licence to print the Bible. However, Campbell also notes that neither Barker nor Lucas suggested the possibility of sabotage in their defence when they were arraigned.

About a year after publication, Barker and Lucas were called to the Star Chamber and fined £300 (equivalent to £58,600 in 2026) and deprived of their printing licence.

== Public reaction ==
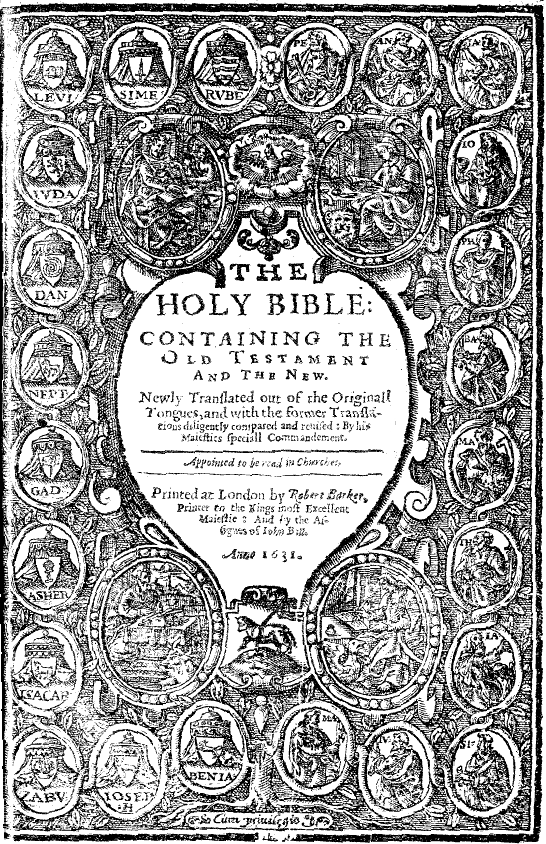
Title page of the Wicked Bible

The case of the Wicked Bible was commented on by Peter Heylyn in 1668:

His Majesties [sic] Printers, at or about this time [1632], had committed a scandalous mistake in our English Bibles, by leaving out the word Not in the Seventh Commandment. His Majesty being made acquainted with it by the Bishop of London, Order was given for calling the Printers into the High-Commission where upon the Evidence of the Fact, the whole Impression was called in, and the Printers deeply fined, as they justly merited.

The Archbishop of Canterbury, George Abbot, expressed anger at both errors. The £300 fine was eventually quashed, but most of the texts were destroyed.

== Origin of the name ==
The name 'Wicked Bible' seems to have first been applied to this edition in 1855 by rare book dealer Henry Stevens. As he relates in his memoir of James Lenox, after buying what was then the only known copy of the edition for fifty guineas, "on 21 June, I exhibited the volume at a full meeting of the Society of Antiquaries of London, at the same time nicknaming it 'The Wicked Bible,' a name that has stuck to it ever since."

== Remaining copies ==
The majority of the Wicked Bible's copies were immediately cancelled and destroyed, and the number of extant copies remaining today, which are considered highly valuable by collectors, is thought to be relatively low. One copy is in the collection of rare books in the New York Public Library and is very rarely made accessible; another can be seen in the Dunham Bible Museum in Houston, Texas.

In 2023, a researcher at the University of Canterbury identified a copy held at the National Central Library of Rome.

There are currently twenty-five known copies of the Wicked Bible, eighteen of which are in the collections of museums and libraries in Europe, North America and Australasia:

Britain (seven copies)

- The British Library
- University of Glasgow Library
- University of Leicester David Wilson Library
- Cambridge University Library
- University of Oxford, Bodleian Library
- University of Manchester, John Rylands Library
- The Library at York Minster

Italy (one copy)

- National Central Library of Rome

United States of America (six copies)

- New York Public Library
- Yale University, Sterling Memorial Library
- Houston Christian University, Dunham Bible Museum
- D.C. Museum of the Bible
- Princeton University Library, Special Collections
- The Lilly Library, Indiana University Bloomington

Canada (one copy)

- University of Toronto, Thomas Fisher Rare Book Library

New Zealand (one copy)

- University of Canterbury, owned by the Phil and Louise Donnithorne Family Trust

Private collections

A number of copies also exist in private collections. In 2008, a copy of the Wicked Bible went up for sale online, priced at $89,500. A second copy was put up for sale from the same website which was priced at $99,500 as of 2015. In 2015, one of the remaining Wicked Bible copies was auctioned by Bonhams, and sold for £31,250 (equivalent to $43,000 in 2025). In 2016, a copy of the Wicked Bible was auctioned by Sotheby's and sold for $46,500. The same copy was auctioned again by Sotheby's in 2018, selling for $56,250.

== See also ==
- Bible errata
- Ten Commandments

== Bibliography ==
- Brown, DeNeen (17 November 2017). "New museum's 'Wicked Bible': Thou Shalt Commit Adultery". The Salt Lake Tribune.
- Campbell, Gordon (2010). Bible: The Story of the King James Version 1611 — 2011. Oxford University Press. ISBN 978-0-19-969301-6.
- Corlett, Eva (2 May 2022). "Rare 'Wicked' bible that encourages adultery discovered in New Zealand". The Guardian. ISSN 0261-3077.
- Dixon, Simon. "Who owned the Wicked Bible?". Library of Special Collections. University of Leicester.
- Flood, Alison (21 October 2015). "Extremely rare Wicked Bible goes on sale". The Guardian.
- Gekoski, Rick (23 November 2010). "The Wicked Bible: the perfect gift for collectors, but not for William and Kate". The Guardian.
- Green, Emma (23 October 2015). "Thou Shalt Commit Adultery: A rare copy of the so-called Wicked Bible of 1631, which omitted a rather important "not" from the 10 Commandments, is going on auction in the U.K." The Atlantic.
- Huntington, Ray L.; Marsh, Jeffrey W.; Skinner, Andrew C.; Whitchurch, David M. "Challenges in Printing Early English Bibles". Religious Studies Center. Brigham Young University.
- Ingelbart, Louis Edward (1987). Press Freedoms: A Descriptive Calendar of Concepts, Interpretations, Events, and Courts Actions, from 4000 B.C. to the Present. Greenwood Publishing. ISBN 0-313-25636-5.
- Jones, Chris. "The Donnithorne Wicked Bible". Digital Voyages. Canterbury University Press.
- Jones, Chris. "The Wicked Bible – The Story". Digital Voyages. Canterbury University Press.
- Kohlenberger, John R. III (2008). NIV Bible Verse Finder. Grand Rapids, MI: Zondervan. ISBN 978-0-310-29205-0.
- Lewis, Stephen (29 November 2008). "The treasures of York Minster Library". York Press.
- Rawson Gardiner, Samuel (1886). Reports of Cases in the Courts of Star Chamber and High Commission. Nichols and Sons.
- Russell, Ray (1980). "The Wicked Bibles". Theology Today. 37 (3): 360–363. doi:10.1177/004057368003700311. S2CID 170449311.
- Stevens, Henry (1886). "The Wicked Bible". Recollections of Mr James Lenox of New York and the Formation of His Library. London: Henry Stevens & Son.
- Turner, Allan (31 August 2015). "Historic Bibles ‑ even a naughty one ‑ featured at Houston's Dunham Museum". Houston Chronicle. Hearst Newspapers.
