= The Scourger =

Finnish thrash metal band

- Origin: Helsinki, Finland
- Genres: Thrash metal
- Years active: 2003–present
- Label: Cyclone Records
- Members: Jari Hurskainen; Jani Hentilä; Jape Nummenpää; Tero Kemppainen
- Past members: Pekka Hämäläinen; Timo Nyberg; Harri Hytönen; Alec Hirst-Gee; Kirka Sainio; Seppo Tarvainen; Kimmo Kammonen; Jani Luttinen; Antti Wirman
- Website: thescourger.net

The Scourger is a thrash metal band from Helsinki, Finland, that formed in 2003. All three of the band's singles have landed on the national Finnish charts: "Hatehead", which debuted at No. 1 in July 2005; "Maximum Intensity", which landed at No. 3 a year later and climbed to No. 2 the following week; and "Never Bury the Hatchet", which entered the charts at No. 9 in July 2007. The first two singles are found on the band's 2006 debut album, Blind Date with Violence, while the third single is on the 2008 follow-up, Dark Invitation to Armageddon. On May 14, 2009, the band announced that it was splitting; vocalist Jari Hurskainen retained The Scourger name, while drummer Seppo Tarvainen, bassist Kimmo Kammonen, and guitarists Jani Luttinen and Antti Wirman will form a new band which has not yet been officially announced. The reason for the split was not given. Hurskainen announced the addition of three new members the following year: Jani Hentilä and Tero Kemppainen on guitars and Jape Nummenpää on bass.

== Band members ==
=== Current members ===
- Jari Hurskainen – vocals
- Jani Hentilä – guitars
- Tero Kemppainen – guitars
- Jape Nummenpää - bass

=== Former members ===
- Pekka Hämäläinen – guitars
- Timo Nyberg – guitars
- Harri Hytönen – guitars
- Seppo Tarvainen – drums
- Jani Luttinen – guitars
- Antti Wirman – guitars
- Kimmo Kammonen – bass

=== Session musicians ===
- Alec Hirst-Gee – bass
- Kirka Sainio – bass

== Discography ==
=== EPs ===
- To the Slayground (2005)

=== Studio albums ===
- Blind Date with Violence (2006)
- Dark Invitation to Armageddon (2008)
