= Kuolemanpalvelus =

Studio album by Sotajumala
- Released: May 26, 2010
- Genre: Death metal
- Length: 52:38
- Label: Cobra Records

Sotajumala chronology
Teloitus (2007)	Kuolemanpalvelus (2010)

Kuolemanpalvelus (English: Ceremony of Death) is the third studio album by the Finnish death metal band Sotajumala. It entered the Finnish billboard charts at position 6 on its release week.

== Track listing ==
No.	Title	Length
1.	"Syvyydessä" (In the Abyss)	5:40
2.	"Paratiisin kutsu" (The Call of Paradise)	4:12
3.	"Kuolleet, toinen jae" (The Dead, Second Verse)	4:57
4.	"Sokeus" (Blindness)	4:57
5.	"Sinun virtesi" (Your Hymn)	6:31
6.	"Toinen tuleminen" (The Second Coming)	5:32
7.	"Luut sinusta muistuttaen" (Bones Reminding Us of You)	7:10
8.	"Kuolemanpalvelus" (Ceremony of Death)	15:00

== Personnel ==
- Mynni Luukkainen – vocals
- Kosti Orbinski – guitar
- Pete Lapio – guitar
- Tomi Otsala – bass, backing vocals
- Timo Häkkinen – drums
