= Thou shalt not commit adultery =

One of the Ten Commandments

"Thou shalt not commit adultery" (Biblical Hebrew: לֹא תִנְאָף, romanized: Lōʾ ṯinʾāp̄) is found in the Book of Exodus of the Hebrew Bible. It is considered the sixth commandment by Roman Catholic and Lutheran authorities, but the seventh by Jewish and most Protestant authorities. What constitutes adultery is not plainly defined in this passage of the Bible, and has been the subject of debate within Judaism and Christianity.

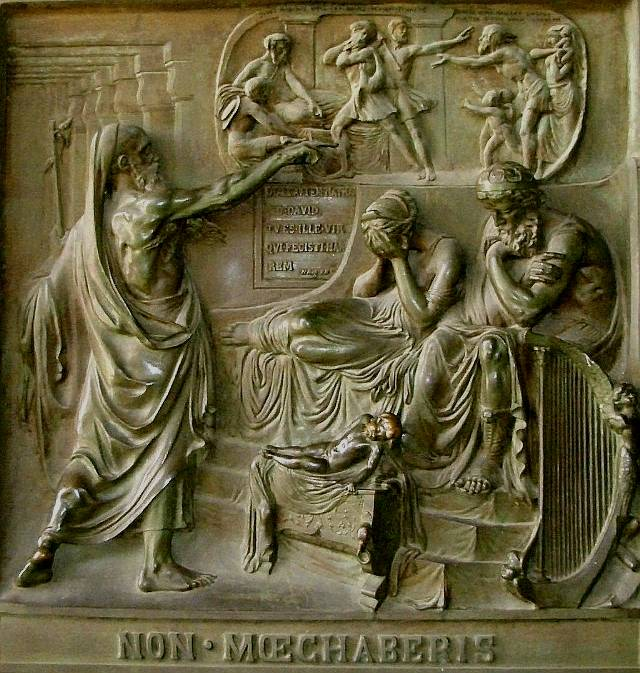
Thou shalt not commit adultery by Baron Henri de Triqueti (1803–74). 1837. Bronze bas-relief panel on the door of the Madeleine Place de La Madeleine, Paris

Thou shalt not murder. Thou shalt not commit adultery. Thou shalt not steal. Thou shalt not bear false witness against thy neighbour.

— Exodus 20:14

== Religious views ==
=== Judaism ===
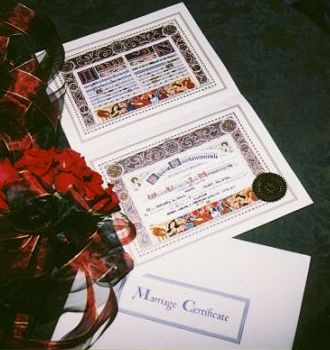
A modern Ketubah (traditional Jewish wedding document)

The transgression of commandments is also called uncleanliness or defilement. This term is especially used of the chief and principal crimes, which are idolatry, adultery, and murder. ... In reference to adultery, we read, "Defile not ye yourselves in any of these things." (Leviticus 18:24)

— Maimonides, in The Guide for the Perplexed

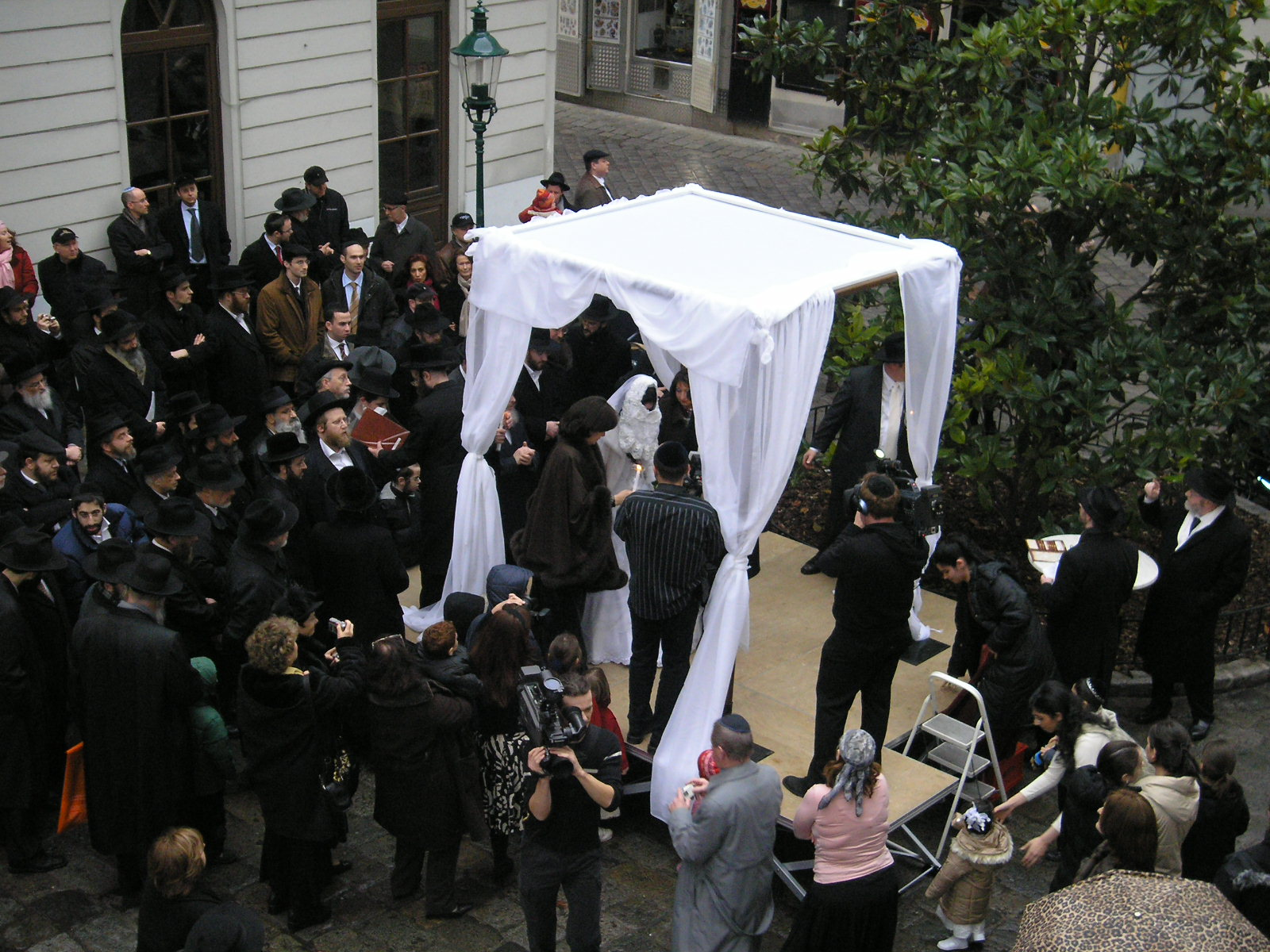
A Jewish wedding in Vienna, Austria, 2007

Leviticus 20:10 defines what constitutes adultery in the Hebrew Bible, and it also prescribes the punishment as capital punishment. In this verse, and in the Jewish tradition, adultery consists of sexual intercourse between a man and a married woman who is not his lawful wife:

And the man that committeth adultery with another man's wife, even he that committeth adultery with his neighbour's wife, the adulterer and the adulteress shall surely be put to death.

Thus, according to the Hebrew Bible, adultery is not committed if the female participant is unmarried (unless she is betrothed to be married), while the marital status of the male participant is irrelevant (he himself could be unmarried or married to another woman).

If a married woman was raped by a man who is not her husband, only the rapist is punished for adultery. The victim is not punished: as the Bible declares, "this matter is similar to when a man rises up against his fellow and murders him"; just as a murder victim is not guilty of murder, a rape victim is not guilty of adultery.

If a husband suspected his wife of adultery, the ordeal of the bitter water could be performed to determine her guilt or innocence. Alternatively, to enforce capital punishment for adultery, at least two witnesses were required, and both the man and woman involved were subject to punishment. While cases of adultery could thus be difficult to prove, divorce laws added over the years enabled a husband to divorce his wife on circumstantial evidence of adultery, without witnesses or additional evidence.

Before the destruction of the Second Temple, the Jewish courts relinquished their right to inflict capital punishment. Changes in punishment for adultery were enacted: The adulterer was scourged, and the husband of the adulteress was compelled to divorce her, and she lost all her property rights under her marriage contract. The adulteress was not allowed to marry the one with whom she had committed adultery; if she did, they were forced to separate.

Although legal enforcement was inconsistently applied, the commandment not to commit adultery remained. Adultery is one of three sins (along with idolatry and murder) that are to be resisted to the point of death. This was the consensus of the rabbis at the meeting at Lydda, during the Bar Kokhba revolt of 132.

The mitzvah to practice sexual relations only within marriage is affirmed by Orthodox, Conservative, and Reform rabbis into modern times. They claim that sexual relations outside of marriage undermine marriage and even love itself, and also emphasize the positive role of sexual relations in strengthening and promoting love within marriage.

=== Christianity ===
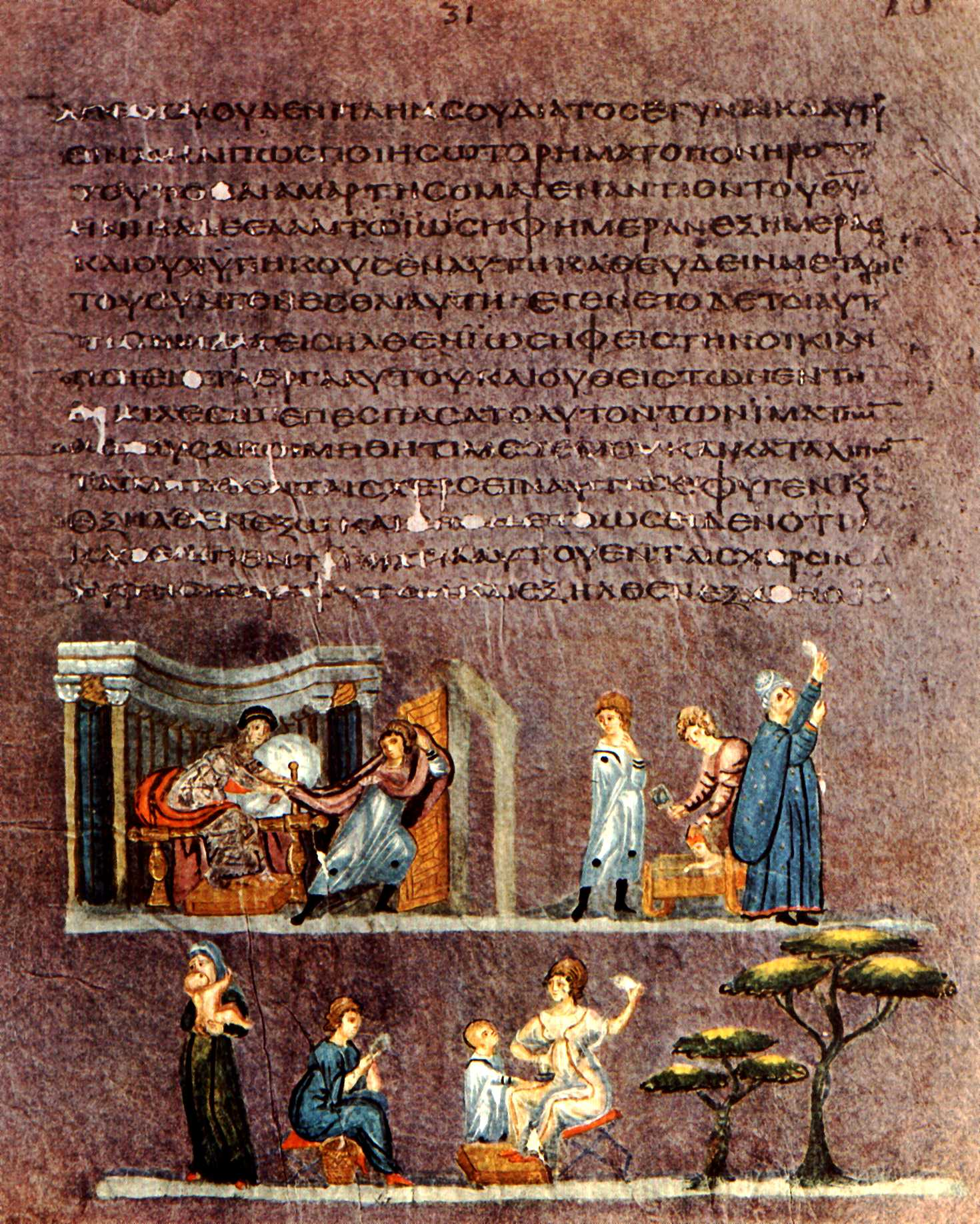
In Egypt, Joseph resisted temptation to adultery at great personal cost. Image from the Vienna Bible, 1743

==== In the New Testament ====
In the gospels, Jesus affirmed the commandment against adultery and seemed to extend it, saying, "But I say to you, anyone who looks on a woman to lust after her has committed adultery with her already in his heart." However, some commentators, including Thomas Aquinas, say that Jesus was making the connection with the commandment, "You shall not covet your neighbor's wife."

According to the gospels, Jesus quoted the book of Genesis regarding the divine origin of the marriage relationship, concluding, "So they are no longer two, but one flesh. Therefore, what God has joined together, no man must separate." Jesus dismissed expedient provisions allowing for divorce for nearly any reason, and cited sexual immorality (a breaking of the marriage covenant) as the only reason why a person may divorce without committing adultery. The Apostle Paul similarly taught (commonly called the Pauline privilege):

To the married I give charge, not I but the Lord, that the wife should not separate from her husband ... and that the husband should not divorce his wife. To the rest I say, not the Lord, ... But if the unbelieving partner desires to separate, let it be so; in such a case the brother or sister is not bound. For God has called us to peace.

In the gospel of John is an account of a woman caught in adultery. Leaders responsible for executing justice brought her to Jesus and asked for his judgment. Jesus clearly identified adultery with sin; however, his statement "Let him who is without sin cast the first stone" did not refer to the precepts of law but to conscience. Some commentators point out that if the woman was caught in adultery, there should also have been a man standing trial. The law clearly stated that both parties were to receive the death penalty. By not bringing the guilty man to justice, these leaders shared in the guilt and were not fit to carry out the punishment. Not condoning her adultery, Jesus warns the woman in parting, "Go and sin no more"

The Apostle Paul wrote frankly about the gravity of adultery:

Know ye not that the unrighteous shall not inherit the kingdom of God? Be not deceived: neither fornicators, nor idolaters, nor adulterers, nor effeminate, nor abusers of themselves with mankind. Nor thieves, nor covetous, nor drunkards, nor revilers, nor extortioners, shall inherit the kingdom of God.

— 1 Corinthians 6:9–11 (KJV)

Within marriage, regular sexual relations are expected and encouraged. "The husband should give to his wife her conjugal rights, and likewise the wife to her husband. For the wife does not have authority over her own body, but the husband does. Likewise the husband does not have authority over his own body, but the wife does." As "one flesh," the husband and wife share this right and privilege; the New Testament does not portray intimacy as something held in reserve by each spouse to be shared on condition. "Stop depriving one another, except by agreement for a time that you may devote yourselves to prayer, and come together again lest Satan tempt you because of your lack of self-control." A stated reason for maintaining marital relations is to reduce the temptation to adultery.

Scripture itself states that Paul was unmarried, but does not clarify whether he never married or was widowed. Nevertheless, they point out he realized the practical advantages of remaining single. He referred to contentment in celibacy as "a gift," and sexual desire as the more common condition of people. For this reason, he recommends that most people are better off married, in order to preclude being tempted beyond what they can bear or going through life "burning with passion."

==== Catholic Church ====
Adultery refers to marital infidelity. When two partners, of whom at least one is married to another party, have sexual relations—even transient ones—they commit adultery.

— Catechism of the Catholic Church 2380

According to the Catechism of the Catholic Church, those who are engaged must refrain from sexual relations until after the marriage ceremony. This exercise of restraint in order to keep the commandment against adultery is also seen as important practice for fidelity within marriage:

Those who are engaged to marry are called to live chastity in continence. They should see in this time of testing a discovery of mutual respect, an apprenticeship in fidelity, and the hope of receiving one another from God. They should reserve for marriage the expressions of affection that belong to married love. They will help each other grow in chastity.

— Catechism of the Catholic Church 2350

The tradition of the Catholic Church has understood the commandment against adultery as encompassing the whole of human sexuality and so pornography is declared a violation of this commandment. Several other sexual activities that may or may not involve married persons are also directly addressed and prohibited in the Catechism.

Adultery is viewed not only as a sin between an individual and God but as an injustice that reverberates through society by harming its fundamental unit, the family:

Adultery is an injustice. He who commits adultery fails in his commitment. He does injury to the sign of the covenant which the marriage bond is, transgresses the rights of the other spouse, and undermines the institution of marriage by breaking the contract on which it is based. He compromises the good of human generation and the welfare of children who need their parents' stable union.

— Catechism of the Catholic Church, 2335

The catechism of the Council of Trent (Part III), published in 1566, defined adultery even more strictly than at present, stating "This commandment, then, resolves itself into two heads; the one expressed, which prohibits adultery; the other implied, which inculcates purity of mind and body." Thus linking the commandment against adultery to the sin of lust in general.

==== Reformation and post-Reformation commentary ====
John Calvin understood the commandment against adultery to extend to sexual relations outside of marriage:

Although one kind of impurity is alone referred to, it is sufficiently plain, from the principle laid down, that believers are generally exhorted to chastity; for, if the Law be a perfect rule of holy living, it would be more than absurd to give a license for fornication (sexual relations between persons not married to each other), adultery alone being excepted.

Matthew Henry understood the commandment against adultery to prohibit sexual immorality in general, and he acknowledged the difficulty people experience: "This commandment forbids all acts of uncleanness, with all those fleshly lusts which produce those acts and war against the soul." Henry supports his interpretation with Matthew 5:28, where Jesus warns that whoever looks at a (married) woman lustfully has already committed adultery with her in his heart.

Marriage should be honored by all, and the marriage bed kept pure, for God will judge the adulterer and all the sexually immoral.

— Hebrews 13:4 (NIV)

Regarding the above passage, Matthew Henry comments:

Here you have, 1. A recommendation of God's ordinance of marriage, that it is honourable in all, … 2. A dreadful but just censure of impurity and lewdness."

John Wesley believed this scripture and the sure judgment of God, even though adulterers "frequently escape the sentence of men."

Martin Luther observed that there were many more people in his day who were unmarried for various reasons than in biblical times, which condition increased both temptation and sexual activities that are displeasing to God:

But because among us there is such a shameful mess and the very dregs of all vice and lewdness, this commandment is directed also against all manner of unchastity, whatever it may be called; ...For flesh and blood remain flesh and blood, and the natural inclination and excitement have their course without let or hindrance, as everybody sees and feels. In order, therefore, that it may be the more easy in some degree to avoid unchastity, God has commanded the estate of matrimony, that every one may have his proper portion and be satisfied therewith …

— Martin Luther, The Large Catechism

Luther neither condemns nor denies human sexuality, but, like the Apostle Paul, claims that God instituted the marriage relationship to provide for its proper enjoyment. Luther comments that each spouse should intentionally cherish the other, and that this will contribute to love and a desire for chastity, which will make fidelity easier.

Let me now say in conclusion that this commandment demands also that every one love and esteem the spouse given him by God. For where conjugal chastity is to be maintained, man and wife must by all means live together in love and harmony, that one may cherish the other from the heart and with entire fidelity. For that is one of the principal points which enkindle love and desire of chastity, so that, where this is found, chastity will follow as a matter of course without any command. Therefore also St. Paul so diligently exhorts husband and wife to love and honor one another.

— Martin Luther, The Large Catechism

The so-called "Wicked Bible", printed in 1631, omits the word "not", reading "Thou shalt commit adultery." Historians are divided as to whether this was a typographical error or the attempt of a competitor to sabotage the print-run.
