= Der Komödienstadel =

Television series

- Country of origin: Germany

Original release
- Network: Bayerischer Rundfunk
- Release: 19 April 1954

Der Komödienstadel is a German comedy franchise, which consists of a television series, radio plays and stage shows. It was first developed by Olf Fischer as a radio play series which first aired on Bayerischer Rundfunk on 19 April 1954. The television series was launched in 1959. The radio plays featured actors such as Gustl Bayrhammer, Max Grießer, Maxl Graf, Erni Singerl and Ludwig Schmid-Wildy.

== Series ==
- 1959 – Der zerbrochene Kruag (two one-act plays) with Hans Baur, Ludwig Schmid-Wildy and Lore Frisch
  - Späte Entdeckung with Michl Lang, Liesl Karlstadt, Wolf Petersen and Konstantin Delcroix
- 1959 – Auf der Alm (four one-act plays) with Franz Fröhlich, Martha Kunig-Rinach, Heinz Möller and Ulla Zorb
  - Kraft mal Weg with Carl Baierl and Hannes Keppler
  - Das Taufessen with Liesl Karlstadt, Erni Singerl and Ludwig Schmid-Wildy
  - Ja, so ein Auerhahn with Ludwig Schmid-Wildy, Hannes Keppler and Karin Rose
- 1961 – Der Zigeunersimmerl with Michl Lang, Ruth Kappelsberger, Amsi Kern and Lothar Kern
- 1961 – Die drei Eisbären with Maxl Graf, Michl Lang, Franz Fröhlich, Marianne Lindner, Ludwig Schmid-Wildy, Dora Altmann and Christa Berndl
- 1961 – Lottchens Geburtstag with Franziska Stömmer, Rolf Castell, Ernst Fritz Fürbringer, Maria Andergast, Iris Mayer and Paula Braend
- 1962 – Der Hochzeiter (two one-act plays) with Ludwig Schmid-Wildy, Ruth Kappelsberger and Helmut Fischer
  - Das Dienstjubiläum with Michl Lang, Martha Kunig-Rinach, Maxl Graf and Erni Singerl
- 1962 – Graf Schorschi with Michl Lang, Lucie Englisch, Maxl Graf, Fritz Straßner, Erni Singerl, Veronika Fitz, Christa Berndl, Marianne Lindner and Georg Rückerl
- 1963 – Der Schusternazi with Franz Fröhlich (Schusternazi), Ludwig Schmid-Wildy, Maxl Graf and Eduard Linkers
- 1963 – Der Geisterbräu with Ruth Kappelsberger, Ludwig Schmid-Wildy and Maxl Graf
- 1964 – Die Tochter des Bombardon with Michl Lang, Marianne Lindner, Maxl Graf and Max Grießer
- 1964 – Die Entwicklungshilfe with Lucie Englisch and Maxl Graf
- 1964 – Wenn der Hahn kräht with Michl Lang and Marianne Lindner
- 1965 – Die Stadterhebung with Fritz Straßner, Maxl Graf, Ludwig Schmid-Wildy, Erni Singerl, Michl Lang, Marianne Brandt, Christa Berndl and Max Grießer
- 1966 – Die Mieterhöhung with Michl Lang, Maxl Graf, Erni Singerl, Ingrid Helbig, Max Grießer and Eduard Linkers
- 1967 – Der verkaufte Großvater with Michl Lang, Karl Tischlinger, Marianne Lindner, Erni Singerl, Ossi Eckmüller, Alexander Golling, Claudia Hansmann-Strubel and Max Grießer
- 1967 – Krach um Jolanthe with Michl Lang, Maxl Graf, Claudia Hansmann-Strubel, Max Grießer and Ossi Eckmüller
- 1969 – Das Wunder des heiligen Florian with Michl Lang, Erni Singerl, Georg Hartl, Christiane Pearce-Blumhoff and Ursula Herion
- 1969 – Witwen with Fritz Straßner, Ruth Kappelsberger, Erni Singerl, Max Grießer and Gustl Bayrhammer
- 1970 – Der Ehrengast with Gustl Bayrhammer, Beppo Brem, Monika Dahlberg, Gerd Fitz, Georg Hartl, Marianne Lindner, Ludwig Schmid-Wildy and Karl Tischlinger
- 1970 – Alles für die Katz' with Marianne Lindner, Ursula Herion, Erni Singerl, Beppo Brem, Ossi Eckmüller, Maxl Graf, Max Grießer and Ulrich Beiger
- 1971 – Der Ehestreik with Maxl Graf and Michl Lang, Katharina de Bruyn, Paula Braend and Marianne Lindner
- 1972 – Mattheis bricht’s Eis with Ludwig Schmid-Wildy, Rosl Mayr, Gerhart Lippert, Hans Löscher and Claus Grießer
- 1972 – Josef Filser – Ein lustiges Spiel mit Ludwig Thoma und seinen Gestalten with Beppo Brem, Fritz Straßner, Anneliese Rehse, Katharina de Bruyn and Maxl Graf
- 1973 – Die drei Dorfheiligen with Gustl Bayrhammer, Marianne Lindner, Ilse Neubauer, Katharina de Bruyn, Karl Tischlinger, Hans Löscher, Gerhart Lippert, Michael Lenz and Georg Hartl
- 1973 – Die drei Eisbären with Gustl Bayrhammer, Gaby Dohm, Maxl Graf, Gerhart Lippert, Marianne Brandt, Marianne Lindner and Ludwig Schmid-Wildy
- 1973 – Die kleine Welt with Gustl Bayrhammer, Katharina de Bruyn, Simone Rethel, Marianne Lindner, Claus Grießer, Johannes Grossmann, Georg Hartl, Maxl Graf, Karl Tischlinger, Ruth Kappelsberger and Fritz Straßner
- 1974 – Das sündige Dorf with Gustl Bayrhammer, Marianne Lindner, Gerhart Lippert, Bernd Helfrich and Christiane Pearce-Blumhoff
- 1975 – Thomas auf der Himmelsleiter with Gerhart Lippert, Max Grießer, Christiane Pearce-Blumhoff, Erni Singerl, Katharina de Bruyn, Karl Tischlinger and Ossi Eckmüller
- 1975 – Der Bauerndiplomat with Karl Tischlinger, Max Grießer, Claus Grießer, Katharina de Bruyn, Hannelore Cremer, Gerhart Lippert, Georg Hartl and Gustl Weishappel
- 1976 – Der bayerische Picasso (two one-act plays) with Karl Tischlinger, Mona Freiberg, Claus Grießer, Winfried Buchner, Klaus Havenstein and Helga Kruck
  - Die Generalprobe with Marianne Lindner, Kathi Leitner, Franziska Stömmer, Gaby van Laak, Peter Steiner, Anton Feichtner and Gerhart Lippert
- 1976 – Herz am Spieß with Katharina de Bruyn, Karl Tischlinger, Barbara Rath, Gerhart Lippert, Erni Singerl and Max Grießer
- 1977 – Graf Schorschi with Beppo Brem, Marianne Lindner, Mona Freiberg, Erni Singerl, Michael Ande, Katharina de Bruyn, Franziska Stömmer and Anton Feichtner
- 1977 – Die Widerspenstigen with Gerhart Lippert, Katharina de Bruyn, Anton Feichtner, Hans Stadtmüller, Werner Rom, Gaby van Laak, Henner Quest, [Karl Tischlinger, Mona Freiberg, Max Grießer and Werner Zeussel
- 1977 – Sankt Pauli in Sankt Peter with Bernd Helfrich, Maxl Graf, Ingrid Burmester, Erni Singerl, Ossi Eckmüller, Inez Günther, Marianne Lindner, Hans Kollmannsberger and Georg Einerdinger
- 1978 – Der ledige Hof with Katharina de Bruyn, Gerhart Lippert, Max Grießer, Marianne Lindner, Stefan Castell, Cornelia Glogger, Beppo Brem, Marianne Brandt, Christiane Pearce-Blumhoff, Alexander Golling and Werner Zeussel
- 1979 – Der Geisterbräu with Gerhart Lippert, Katharina de Bruyn, Angelika Milster, Gerda Steiner-Paltzer, Marius Aicher, Herbert Nußbaum, Ossi Eckmüller, Amsi Kern, Willy Schultes, Elisabeth Karg and Thomas Reiner
- 1980 – Der Strohwitwer with Peter Steiner, Max Grießer, Brigitte Walbrun, Monika Dahlberg and Franziska Stömmer
- 1981 – Spätlese oder Auch der Herbst hat schöne Tage with Gustl Bayrhammer and Katharina de Bruyn
- 1982 – Die Tochter des Bombardon with Gustl Bayrhammer, Ruth Kappelsberger, Kristina Nel and Willy Harlander
- 1983 – Heiratsfieber with Gerhart Lippert, Maxl Graf, Katharina de Bruyn, Manuela Denz and Max Grießer
- 1984 – Liebe und Blechschaden with Max Grießer, Katharina de Bruyn, Julia Fischer, Gerhart Lippert and Monika Dahlberg
- 1984 – Doppelte Moral with Max Grießer, Katharina de Bruyn, Bernd Helfrich and Christine Neubauer
- 1984 – Der Senior with Maxl Graf, Kathi Leitner, Werner Asam, Sandra White, Toni Berger, Katharina de Bruyn, Michael Lerchenberg, Georg Lohmeier, Gerd Deutschmann, Monika Madras, Rolf Castell, Maria Peschek, Egon Biscan and Sabine Biber
- 1985 – Politik und Führerschein with Gerhart Lippert, Max Grießer, Maria Singer, Horst Kummeth and Willy Schultes
- 1985 – Paraplü und Perpendikel with Gerhart Lippert, Maria Singer, Max Grießer, Manuela Denz, Claus Obalski and Georg Einerdinger
- 1985 – Wenn der Hahn kräht with Maxl Graf, Katharina de Bruyn, Julia Fischer, Beppo Brem and Ruth Kappelsberger
- 1985 – Der Onkel Pepi with Katharina de Bruyn, Gerd Fitz, Hansi Kraus, Gabriele Grund, Michael Fitz, Rolf Castell, Heide Ackermann, Nini von Quast, Franz Hanfstingl, Alexander Malachovsky and Gerd Deutschmann
- 1985 – Schneesturm with Gerhart Lippert, Erni Singerl, Mona Freiberg, Toni Berger, Werner Zeussel and Manuela Denz
- 1986 – Der Nothelfer with Max Grießer und Katharina de Bruyn, Manuela Denz, Hansi Kraus, Christoph Krix, Gabriele Grund, Wilfried Klaus, Ossi Eckmüller and Peter Musäus
- 1986 – Glück mit Monika with Bernd Helfrich, Bettina von Haken, Michaela Heigenhauser, Andreas Kern, Ossi Eckmüller and Georg Einerdinger
- 1986 – Das Prämienkind with Gerd Fitz, Max Grießer, Michael Lerchenberg and Christine Neubauer
- 1987 – Doppelselbstmord with Max Grießer and Katharina de Bruyn
- 1989 – Der brave Sünder with Max Grießer and Katharina de Bruyn
- 1990 – Die hölzerne Jungfrau with Max Grießer and Marianne Lindner
- 1991 – Millionen im Heu with Gerhart Lippert and Mona Freiberg
- 1993 – Die Kartenlegerin with Udo Thomer and Veronika Fitz
- 1993 – Der siebte Bua with Bernd Helfrich, Sabina Trooger and Fred Stillkrauth
- 1994 – Die Hochzeitskutsche with Fred Stillkrauth and Max Grießer
- 1994 – Die goldene Gans with Toni Berger, Hansi Kraus and Michael Häfner
- 1995 – Die Wadlbeißer von Traxlbach with Bernd Helfrich, Philipp Seiser, Peter Rappenglück, Katja Bienert, Astrid Jacob and Nina Kapust
- 1995 – Der müde Theodor with Willy Harlander and Mona Freiberg
- 1996 – Minister gesucht with Gerd Fitz, Ilse Neubauer, Toni Berger and Michaela Geuer
- 1996 – Zur Ehe haben sich versprochen with Heide Ackermann, Christiane Pearce-Blumhoff, Ernst Cohen, Toni Berger and Eleonore Daniel
- 1997 – Bonifaz der Orgelstifter with Toni Berger, Kathi Leitner, Alexander Duda and Joseph Hannesschläger
- 1998 – Der verkaufte Großvater with Toni Berger and Willy Harlander
- 1999 – Lachende Wahrheit with Erni Singerl, Josef Thalmaier, Hans Kitzbichler, Alexander Duda, Ileana-Lia Popa, Alfons Biber and Wolfram Kunkel
- 1999 – Der Zigeunersimmerl with Hans Clarin, Max Grießer and Maria Singer
- 1999 – Der Leberkasbaron with Fred Stillkrauth, Toni Berger and Kathi Leitner
- 2000 – Das liebe Geld with Toni Berger, Kathi Leitner, Willy Harlander and Alexander Duda
- 2000 – Die Bißgurrn with Christiane Pearce-Blumhoff and Hans Kitzbichler
- 2000 – S'Herz am rechten Fleck with Werner Rom, Anton Feichtner and Josef Thalmaier
- 2001 – Heldenstammtisch with Anton Feichtner and Jutta Schmuttermaier
- 2001 – Die Jacobi-Verschwörung with Toni Berger, Winfried Frey and Lisa Kreuzer
- 2002 – Achterbahn ins Glück with Gerhart Lippert, Jutta Schmuttermaier and Anton Feichtner
- 2003 – s' Breznbusserl with Franz Xaver Huber and Christiane Pearce-Blumhoff
- 2003 – Das Attenhamer Christkindl with Heide Ackermann, Christiane Pearce-Blumhoff and Susanne Brantl
- 2004 – Der Prinzregentenhirsch with Heide Ackermann and Götz Burger
- 2004 – Skandal im Doktorhaus with Hermann Giefer, Heide Ackermann and Veronika von Quast
- 2005 – Amerikaner mit Zuckerguss with Winfried Frey, Franz Xaver Huber and Christiane Pearce-Blumhoff
- 2005 – Herzsolo with Johann Schuler, Veronika von Quast and Jutta Schmuttermaier
- 2005 – Der weibscheue Hof with Erni Singerl, Götz Burger, Johann Schuler and Sabrina White
- 2005 – Karten lügen nicht with Werner Zeussel and Christiane Pearce-Blumhof
- 2005 – Hopfazupfa with Monika Baumgartner, Harald Dietl and Dragan Mija Kovic
- 2005 – Der Habererbräu with Jutta Schmuttermaier and Hans Kitzbichler
- 2005 – Kuckuckskind with Fred Stillkrauth, Alexander Duda and Christiane Pearce-Blumhoff
- 2006 – Die Maibaumwache with Sepp Schauer, Winfried Frey and Lilian Naumann
- 2006 – Der Prämienstier with Erich Hallhuber senior, Monika Baumgartner, Johann Schuler, Petra Auer-Frey, Natalie Spinell, Marianne Rappenglück, Werner Zeussel, Lance Gira, Götz Burger, Dieter Fischer, Hansi Kraus, Stefan Murr, Markus Neumaier and Markus Baumeister
- 2007 – Alles fest im Griff with Heide Ackermann, Brigitte Walbrun, Johann Schuler, Franz Xaver Huber and Alexandra Schiffer
- 2007 – Dottore d’Amore with Anton Feichtner, Franz Xaver Huber, Dieter Fischer, Christiane Pearce-Blumhoff, Sara Sommerfeldt and Eleonore Daniel
- 2007 – Der Fischerkrieg vom Chiemsee with Horst Kummeth, Natalie Spinell, Marianne Lindner, Jutta Schmuttermaier, Johann Schuler, Götz Burger, Elmar Drexel, Markus Neumaier, Wolfram Kunkel, Markus Baumeister, Ursula-Maria Rehm and Lance Gira
- 2007 – Links Rechts Gradaus with Horst Kummeth, Jutta Schmuttermaier, Christiane Pearce-Blumhoff, Natalie Spinell, Christian K. Schaeffer, Pavel Fieber, Sabrina White, Markus Neumaier, Franz Froschauer, Erich Hallhuber senior, Hansi Kraus, Werner Rom, Michael Stimpel and Markus Baumeister
- 2007 – Der magische Anton with Christian K. Schaeffer, Johann Schuler, Bettina Redlich, Judith Toth, Sabrina White, Pavel Fieber, Silke Popp, Robert Joseph Bartl and Andreas Borcherding
- 2007 – Das Cäcilienwunder with Heide Ackermann, Christiane Pearce-Blumhoff, Winfried Frey, Dieter Fischer, Johann Schuler, Corinna Binzer, Maria Weidner, Joachim Bauer, Sabrina White and Harry Täschner
- 2007 – Die Versuchung des Aloysius Federl with Johann Schuler, Götz Burger and Christiane Pearce-Blumhoff
- 2008 – Foulspui with Alexander Duda, Bettina Redlich, Eva-Maria Reichert, Christian K. Schaeffer, Simon Pearce, Julia Urban, Heide Ackermann, Conny Glogger and Markus Neumaier
- 2008 – Weiberwallfahrt with Monika Baumgartner, Erich Hallhuber senior, Veronika von Quast, Lilian Naumann, Judith Toth and Natalie Spinell
- 2008 – Adam und Eva im Paradies with Markus Neumaier, Heide Ackermann, Corinna Binzer, Sara Sommerfeldt, Franz Xaver Huber, Heinz-Josef Braun and Christian K. Schaeffer
- 2008 – G’suacht und G’fund’n with Monika Baumgartner, Alexander Duda, Sabrina White, Christian K. Schaeffer, Anton Feichtner and Veronika von Quast
- 2008 – Pension Schaller with Johann Schuler, Heide Ackermann, Christiane Pearce-Blumhoff, Stefan Murr, Corinna Binzer, Eva-Maria Reichert, Dieter Fischer, Winfried Frey and Michael Vogtmann
- 2008 – Die schöne Münchnerin with Isabella Jantz, Winfried Frey, Corinna Binzer, Jutta Schmuttermaier, Heide Ackermann, Marianne Rappenglück, Erich Hallhuber senior, Markus Neumaier, Joachim Vollrath, Christian K. Schaeffer, Bernhard Butz and Thomas Schechinger
- 2009 – Der letzte Bär von Bayern with Pavel Fieber, Enzi Fuchs, Rhon Diels, Melanie Kogler, Wolfram Kunkel, Robert Joseph Bartl, Franz Froschauer, Sabrina White, Karl Friedrich and Christian K. Schaeffer
- 2009 – Glenn Miller & Sauschwanzl with Corinna Binzer, Johannes Herrschmann, Johann Schuler, Katharina Schwägerl, Ferdinand Schmidt-Modrow, Erich Hallhuber senior, Heide Ackermann, Dieter Fischer, Stefan Murr, Simon Pearce and Lance Gira
- 2009 – Endstation Drachenloch with Johann Schuler, Heide Ackermann, Markus Neumaier, Erich Hallhuber senior, Eva-Maria Reichert and Melanie Kogler
- 2009 – Verhexte Hex with Sebastian Edtbauer, Heide Ackermann, Isabella Jantz and Veronika von Quast
- 2010 – Die Doktorfalle with Johann Schuler, Christian K. Schaeffer and Stefan Murr
- 2010 – Duttenfeiler with Johann Schuler, Heide Ackermann and Dieter Fischer
- 2010 – Das Kreuz mit den Schwestern with Markus Neumaier, Heide Ackermann and Ina Meling
- 2011 – Die Provinzdiva with Sabrina White, Christiane Pearce-Blumhoff, Gerhart Lippert, Götz Burger, Sebastian Edtbauer, Leo Reisinger, Markus Neumaier, Kerstin Becke, Julia Urban, Winfried Frey and Isabella Jantz
- 2011 – A Flascherl vom Glück with Dieter Fischer, Corinna Binzer, Matthias Ransberger, Heide Ackermann, Katharina Schwägerl, Johann Schuler|, Heinz-Josef Braun, Johanna Bittenbinder and Markus Neumaier
- 2011 – Herz ist Gold with Christiane Pearce-Blumhoff, Heide Ackermann, Winfried Frey, Sabrina White, Ina Meling, Götz Burger and Sebastian Edtbauer
- 2012 – Lauter Hornochsen with Johann Schuler, Matthias Ransberger, Lilian Naumann, Markus Neumaier, Eva-Maria Höfling, Christian K. Schaeffer, Winfried Frey, Julia Urban, Ina Meling, Thomas Schechinger, Wolfram Kunkel and Hans Kitzbichler
- 2012 – Die fromme Helene with Heide Ackermann, Dieter Fischer, Julia Urban and Matthias Ransberger
- 2012 – Obandlt is! with Heide Ackermann, Winfried Frey, Corinna Binzer, Ina Meling, Sebastian Edtbauer and Josepha Sophia Sem
- 2012 – Hummel im Himmel with Matthias Ransberger, Saskia Vester, Heinz-Josef Braun and Katharina Schwägerl
- 2013 – Allein unter Kühen with Dieter Fischer, Heide Ackermann, Winfried Hübner and Young-Shin Kim
- 2013 – A Mordsgschicht with Senta Auth, Christian K. Schaeffer, Heide Ackermann, Susanne Wiesner, Claus Steigenberger, Matthias Ransberger, Norbert Heckner, Gerd Lohmeyer, Johannes Herrschmann, Veronika von Quast, Dominik Nowak and Ferdinand Schmidt-Modrow
- 2014 – Alpenglühn und Männertreu with Winfried Frey, Johanna Bittenbinder, Gerhard Wittmann, Johann Schuler, Sebastian Edtbauer, Teresa Rizos, Corinna Binzer, Kathrin Anna Stahl and Markus Neumaier
- 2014 – 1001 Nacht in Tegernbrunn with Ferdinand Schmidt-Modrow, Harald Helfrich, Conny Glogger, Susanne Wiesner, Alexander Duda, Matthias Ransberger, Bernhard Ulrich, Ina Meling and Jürgen Fischer
- 2014 – Wenn’s lafft, dann lafft’s with Fischer, Katharina Schwägerl, Julia Urban, Heide Ackermann, Johannes Herrschmann and Stefan Murr
- 2015 – Paulas letzter Wille with Heide Ackermann, Matthias Ransberger, Götz Burger, Corinna Binzer, Claus Steigenberger, Judith Mauthe, Stephen Sikder, Caro Hetényi, Leo Reisinger and Sarah Camp
- 2015 – Der fast keusche Josef with Dieter Fischer, Johanna Bittenbinder, Moritz Katzmair, Ina Meling, Corinna Binzer, Christian K. Schaeffer and Andreas Bittl
- 2015 – Agent Alois with Heinz-Josef Braun, Benedikt Blaskovic, Ramona Kunze-Libnow, Johanna Martin, Johann Schuler, Bettina Redlich, Matthias Ransberger, Markus Baumeister, Janina Möller and Paul Peteanu
- 2016 – Ein Garten voll Schlawiner with Heide Ackermann, Ferdinand Schmidt-Modrow, Veronika Hörmann, Corinna Binzer, Georg Luibl, Norbert Heckner and Matthias Ransberger
- 2016 – Göttinnen weißblau with Johanna Bittenbinder, Dieter Fischer, Winfried Hübner, Heide Ackermann, Corinna Binzer, Andreas Bittl and Markus Neumaier
- 2017 – Der Cowboy von Haxlfing with Markus Baumeister, Winfried Hübner, Teresa Rizos, Johann Schuler, Armin Stockerer, Franz-Xaver Zeller, Nikola Norgauer, Wolfgang Mirlach and Bernd Kleinschnitz
- 2017 – Rock 'n' Roll im Abendrot with Heide Ackermann, Maria Peschek, Werner Haindl, Winfried Hübner, Bettina Redlich, Annabel Faber, Andreas Bittl, Horst Rankl and Gerhard Berger
- 2018 – Odel verpflichtet with Dieter Fischer, Bettina Redlich, Maria Peschek, Heide Ackermann and Andreas Bittl
- 2019 – Ein Bayer in der Unterwelt with Bernhard Ulrich, Sophie Reiml, Tommy Schwimmer, Hermann Giefer and Werner Rom
- 2019 – Der Unschuldsengel with Dieter Fischer, Judith Toth, Heide Ackermann, Maria Peschek and Winfried Hübner
- 2019 – Selbst ist die Frau with Judith Peres, Armin Stockerer, Manuela Denz, Sabine Sachse and Nikolaus Ruml
- 2019 – Deifi Sparifankerl with Michael Hausperger, Daniela Hausler, Lorenz Sirtl, Matthias Ransberger, Claus Steigenberger, Petra Auer-Frey, Iris Koneczny, Caro Hetényi and Christiane Pearce-Blumhoff
- 2020 – Der Beste für die Besten with Berthold Kellner, Kirstin Rokita, Sabine Hiltl, Emi Strunz, Klaus Schmidmeister, Philipp W. Wilhelm, Marget Flach, Marion Schieder, Wolfgang Kamm, Josefine Spörer, Claudia Pausch, Anita Bösl, Sonja Seiberl and Franz Meyer
- 2020 – Nix geht mehr with Wowo Habdank, Nikola Norgauer, Franziska Janetzko, Sina Reiß, Florian Fischer, Uli Bauer and Christoph Zrenner
- 2020 – Da Austrags-Schwindel with Kathi Leitner, Winfried Frey, Ludwig Schaffernicht, Nicola Pendelin, Bärbel Kinshofer, Andreas Löscher, Wiltrud Steiger, Roland Thurmayr and Thomas J. Heim
- 2021 – Bodschamperlspuk with Michael Hausperger, Max Beier, Daniela Hausler, Nicola Pendelin, Corinna Binzer, Markus H. Eberhard, Iris Koneczny and Florian Bauer
- 2022 – Das Orakel von Ramersdorf with Dieter Fischer, Julia Urban, Moritz Katzmair, Heide Ackermann, Winfried Hübner, Ursula Maria Burkhart and Josef Daser
- 2023 – Ach Du lieber Gott with Dieter Fischer, Julia Urban, Katharina Plank, Ursula Maria Burkhart, Heide Ackermann, Sebastian Edtbauer and Ferdinand Dörfler
- 2024 – A Wiesn Gschicht with Dieter Fischer, Ursula Maria Burkhart, Julia Urban, Katharina Plank, Heide Ackermann, Sebastian Edtbauer and Andreas Bittl

== See also ==
- List of German television series
