= Kammeroper München =

Kammeroper München (Munich Chamber Opera) is an independent ensemble for chamber operas in Munich. The troupe was founded by Christiane Steffens, Christophe Gördes and Carlos Dominguez-Nieto. They have played regularly at the Hubertussaal of Schloss Nymphenburg from 2008, but also use different venues including the Cuvilliés-Theater.

The organisation has engaged young singers to give them the opportunity of stage experience at the beginning of their career. The chamber orchestra players come from Munich stages and orchestras.

== Program ==
The Kammeroper has produced one annual complete opera, as well as additional concerts such as composer portraits and recitals, sometimes with already known singers including Michael Mendl, Michaela May, Sophie von Kessel, Sabine Sauer, Gerd Anthoff, Lisa Wagner, August Zirner, Thomas Loibl, Friedrich von Thun, Johannes Silberschneider, Juliane Banse, Waltraud Meier, Robert Gambill, Günther Groissböck, Daniel Behle and Okka von der Damerau.

The operas are often arranged for chamber orchestra, and played with new texts, often in translations into German.

== Productions ==
Complete operas have included:

- 2006
  - Cimarosa: Il matrimonio segreto – Die heimliche Ehe
- 2007
  - Rossini: La pietra del paragone – Die Liebesprobe
- 2008
  - Mozart: La finta semplice – Die Abenteuer des Don Gisberto
  - Piccinni: La Cecchina
- 2009
  - Untreue lohnt sich! oder auch nicht, pasticcio with music by Joseph Haydn
- 2010
  - Oscar Straus: Die lustigen Nibelungen
  - Rossini: La gazza ladra – Die diebische Elster
  - Mozart: Der Diener zweier Herren
  - Mozart: Truffaldino! – Zwei Herren auf einen Streich
- 2012
  - Suppé: Die schöne Galathée / Jacques Offenbach: Häuptling Abendwind
  - Rossini: La Cenerentola
- 2013
  - Antonio Salieri: Ritter Falstaff oder drei Streiche für ein Schepperfass!
  - Salieri: Falstaff
- 2014
  - Fischer: Charleys Tante
  - Franz Schubert: Kaspar Hauser – Ein Traumspiel
- 2015
  - Mozart: La finta semplice
- 2016
  - Rossini: Il barbiere di Siviglia – Der Barbier von Sevilla
- 2017
  - Haydn: Die Welt auf dem Mond
- 2018
  - Mozart: Così fan tutte
- 2019
  - Das Gespenst von Canterville, comic oper after Oscar Wilde with music by Gershwin, Purcell, Dowland and others
- 2020
  - Cimarosa: Die heimliche Ehe
- 2021
  - Maria Antonia Walpurgis: Talestri
- 2022
  - Mozart: Le nozze di Figaro
- 2023
  - Mozart: Die Entführung aus dem Serail
