= Löwengrube – Die Grandauers und ihre Zeit =

- Also known as: Löwengrube
- Based on: Die Grandauers und ihre Zeit (radio show) by Willy Purucker
- Written by: Willy Purucker
- Directed by: Rainer Wolffhardt
- Starring: Jörg Hube; Sandra White; Gerd Fitz; Christine Neubauer; Franziska Stömmer
- Theme music composer: Peter Sandloff
- Countries of origin: Germany; Austria
- Original language: German
- No. of seasons: 3
- No. of episodes: 32

Production
- Production company: Tellux-Film

Original release
- Network: Das Erste
- Release: 14 November 1989

Löwengrube – Die Grandauers und ihre Zeit is a German television series first aired between 1989 and 1992, created by Willy Purucker and directed by Rainer Wolffhardt. It is set in Munich and follows the lives of Ludwig Grandauer and his son Karl, both policemen, covering the years from 1897 to 1954. The TV show is based on Purucker's radio play series Die Grandauers und ihre Zeit (‘The Grandauers and their time’). The series’ main title Löwengrube, meaning ‘Lions’ Den’, refers to the address of the Munich Police Headquarters inaugurated in 1913.

== Cast ==
- Jörg Hube as Ludwig Grandauer (episodes 1–4) and as Karl Grandauer (episodes 5—32)
- Sandra White as Agnes Grandauer (episodes 1–3) and as Luise Kreitmeier, born Grandauer (episodes 4–15)
- Christian Mader as young Karl Grandauer (episodes 1–3)
- Julia Gaßner as young Luise Grandauer (episodes 1–3)
- Thomas Klietsch as young Adolf Grandauer (episodes 1–3)
- Gundi Ellert as Franzi Gassner, born Reschreiter, widowed Fuchs (episodes 1–3)
- Gerd Fitz as Rudolf Grüner (episodes 1—22)
- Fred Stillkrauth as Lederer (episodes 1–10)
- Marie Bardischewski as Frau Gschmeißner (episodes 1–5, 8–9, 11, 13, 15–16)
- Gerhart Lippert as Herr Gassner (episodes 1–2)
- Andreas Gepfert as Lichtl-Biwi (episodes 2–3)
- Andreas Zappe as young Metzger-Willy (episode 2)
- Jonas Vischer as Holzinger (episodes 4–14)
- Georg Einerdinger as janitor at the Munich police headquarters (episodes 4–32)
- Andreas Hufnagl as young Adolf Grandauer (episode 4)
- Peter Weiß as Lichtl-Biwi (episode 4)
- Werner Rom as Max Kreitmeier (episodes 5–32)
- Christoph Krix as Toni Schöpf (episodes 5–11)
- Christine Neubauer as Traudl Grandauer, born Soleder (episodes 5—32)
- Walter Fitz as August Soleder (episodes 5–7)
- Sepp Schauer as a butcher (episodes 5, 8)
- Alexander Duda as Adolf Grandauer (episodes 6—21, 26–32)
- Franziska Stömmer as Adelgunde Soleder (episodes 6—32)
- Michael Lerchenberg as Kurt Soleder (episodes 6—29, 32)
- Gisela Freudenberg as Sara Soleder, born Kampensi (episodes 7—29, 32)
- Erich Hallhuber as Metzger-Willy (episodes 7, 13, 17, 28)
- Florian Reinheimer as Max Grandauer (episodes 10–21)
- Florian Büse-Böhm as Rudi Grandauer (episodes 10–21)
- Stefan Reck as Hampel (episodes 10–13, 16)
- Gerd Anthoff as Walter Deinlein (episodes 11–32)
- Hansi Kraus as Kargus (episodes 11–32)
- Peter Pius Irl as Block Warden Uhl (episodes 11–13, 15)
- Volker Prechtel as Waldhauser (episodes 11–12)
- Mona Freiberg as Kathi Kreitmeier, widowed Lipp (episodes 16–32)
- Thomas Darchinger as Max Grandauer (episodes 24–32)

Sandra White, who had been playing Luise Kreitmeier, born Grandauer since episode 4, died unexpectedly at age 26 during the production of the second season. Mona Freiberg was then cast as a substitute, playing the new but similar role of Kathi Lipp.

== Music ==
The opening and end theme was composed by Peter Sandloff and played by the Pasadena Roof Orchestra, recording numerous variations to match the tone of the individual episodes.

== Episodes ==
=== Season 1 (1989/90) ===
1. Charivari (‘Charivari’)
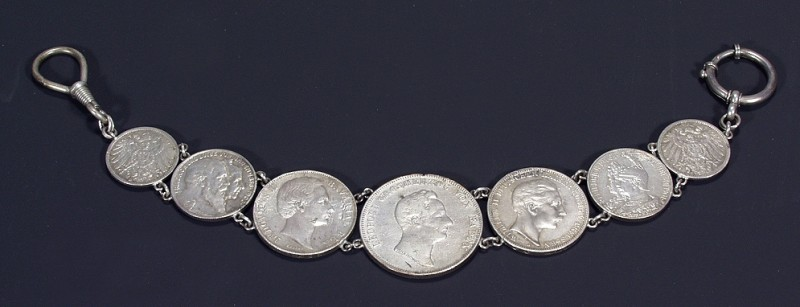
  Early 20th-century Charivari made of coins.
  Spring 1897: In a village near Munich, local policeman Ludwig Grandauer marries Agnes, with whom he already has a three-year-old son. During the wedding reception, Mr. Gantner, the overbearing leaseholder of a hunting ground in the woods nearby, is annoyed by pedlar Eccell’s singing and yells at him. When Gantner is reported missing the next morning, and a farmer interviewed by the police tells them that his daughter saw Eccell going after Gantner the night before, Eccell is arrested, holding a considerable amount of money as well as Gantner’s Charivari in his possession, but keeps insisting that he found it lying on the ground at the edge of the forest. One of the policemen unsuccessfully tries to make him confess by punching him in the mouth hard; afterwards, Ludwig Grandauer has to take Eccell to the Munich police department, where he is held in custody for further investigation. Only years later, Grandauer learns that Eccell hanged himself in his cell after being kept prisoner for almost nine months despite the apparent lack of sufficient evidence against him.
  1907: Grandauer, now a constable in the city of Munich, is called to the site of a murder, where he finds a precious pocket watch, that looks exactly like the one Gantner was showing him right before the quarrel at his wedding ten years earlier. After some initial backlash, his superiors follow the trail, and are able to backtrack the watch to a pawnshop, where it was hocked in April 1898 by a man presumably using a false name, having emended his signature to match the initials F. G. engraved into the lid, after first writing an S. Agnes then points out to her husband that the legal family name of the farmer having testified against Eccell, though commonly known by their house name Tannhauser, is actually Schober, and that his son emigrated to America in 1898, not long after the watch was brought to the pawnshop. When the police come to investigate the farm, the daughter admits that Gantner is buried right next to their stable, and accuses her father of the killing, who in turn blames her and her brother, whom they would not find anyway now, eventually revealing that it had been all about his daughter's supposed pregnancy after her having an affair with Gantner.
2. Abgründe (‘Chasms’)
  May 1909: One evening while out watching a match of women’s wrestling with two friends of his, Metzger-Willy and Lichtl-Biwi, young Karl Grandauer’s bicycle is stolen, but he dare not tell the police nor his father Ludwig. Willy and Biwi convince him to try and win the money for a new bike at the horse race; when Karl loses, Willy persuades him to take some equipment from the photographer he works for as an apprentice, and use it to produce erotic images of a young woman he will bring in. Following a minor accident with Biwi’s bicycle, a policeman discovers and confiscates the pictures, leaving Karl frightened that his father will know. When he confesses to his mother, she first goes with him to the police and successfully asks for the photographs to be given to her without informing her husband; then she takes her son to the photographer’s shop to make him apologize to his master, who turns out to be rather amused by the whole matter.
  Meanwhile, Ludwig Grandauer and his colleague Mr. Lederer are busy investigating the suicide of a finishing school’s headmaster, Dr. von Mandel, who had allegedly been caught up in a love affair, but is defended by one of the teachers, who accuses the headmaster’s wife of being responsible for his death. Grandauer subsequently finds out that she actually did set a trap in order to get rid of her husband by hiring a former prostitute to enter his bedroom, and a private detective to document the incriminating scene.
  Agnes Grandauer shows symptoms of a persistent lung disease, and is urged by Ludwig to go to a doctor.
3. Herrenfahrer (‘Gentleman Driver’)
  December 1910: A dead man found on a road has apparently been killed by a collision with a car, that lost a metal ring from one of its head lamps at the scene. When examining the house of the deceased man, who worked as a taxidermist, Constable Ludwig Grandauer and Inspector Rudolf Grüner find traces of blood beside his bed, and a hammer lying on the floor. When Grandauer interrogates the taxidermist's journeyman, who is living in miserable circumstances with his wife and children, he admits that he got into a fight with his master over some unpaid wages, and hit him in the head with a hammer, then taking his money before escaping. The metal ring from the car eventually leads to retired Major General von Hagen from Berlin, who acts very dismissive when Grandauer tries to interrogate him, and denies having anything to do with the accident.
  Agnes Grandauer suffers from tuberculosis, and her daughter Luise has to take care of her and do most of the housework. One day, a friend of Agnes’ son Karl, Lichtl-Biwi, brings in a gramophone to play some music for her, and she takes great delight in listening to it; the same evening, Ludwig announces to his children that their mother needs to enter a sanatorium soon, likely before Christmas.
4. Wachablösung (‘Changing of the Guard’)
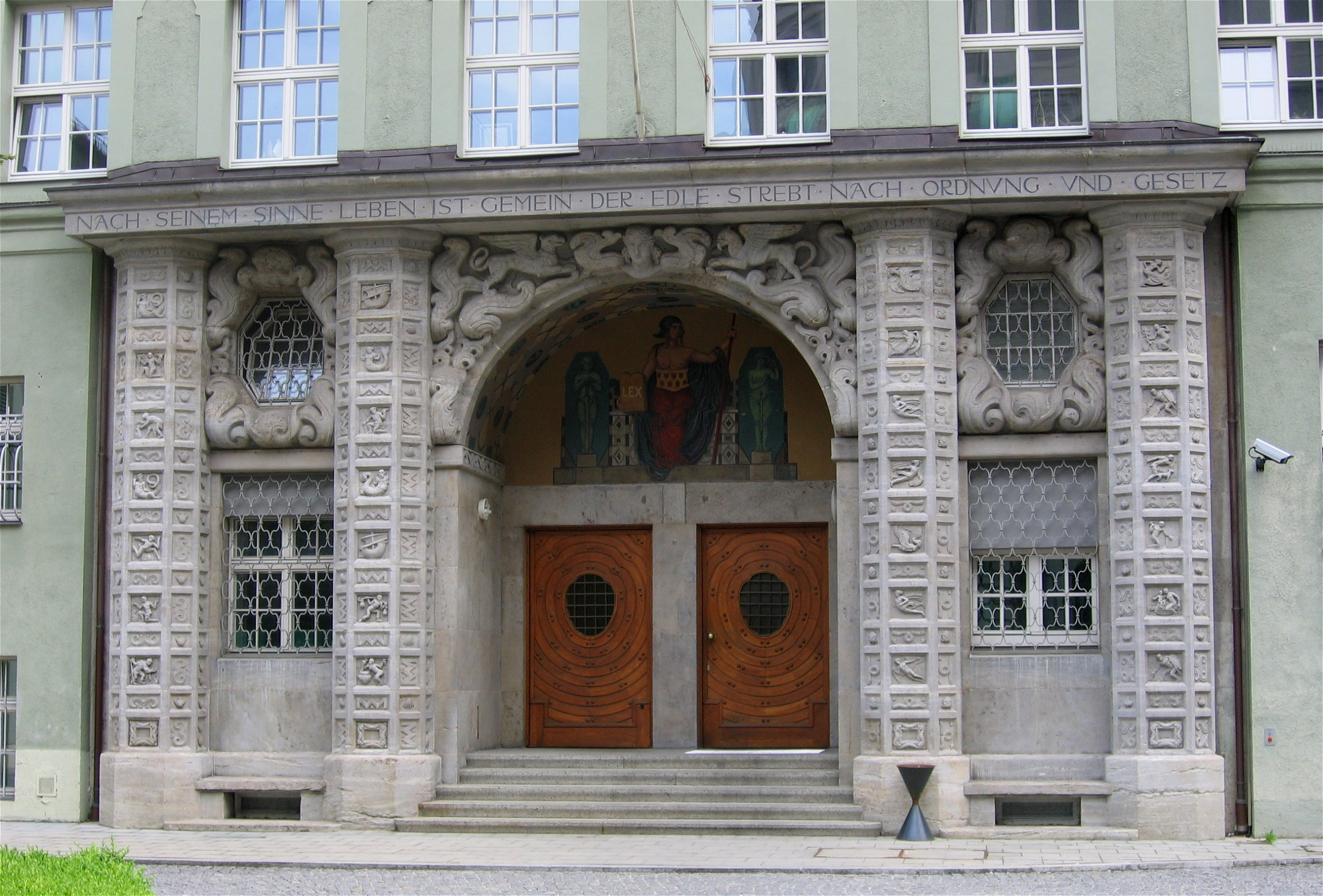
  Entrance to the Munich police headquarters built 1910–1913.
  March 1914: The Munich police has moved into its new headquarters. Adolf Hitler, a young painter from Austria, comes in to have his permit of residence extended. Lederer and novice Dannenberger are detached to monitor a speech held by socialist Rosa Luxemburg.
  June 28, 1914: Ludwig Grandauer goes to visit his late wife's grave on the first anniversary of her death with his daughter Luise and his younger son Adolf, while his elder son Karl is doing military duty; at the cemetery they meet Inspector Rudolf Grüner and his wife, who have lost their seven-year-old daughter a few years earlier; Grüner invites the Grandauers to a beer garden in the evening. Lichtl-Biwi, a friend of Karl's also serving in the army, comes to see the Grandauers while on his leave, and goes along with them and the Grüners. When he asks for a dance with Luise, Ludwig very reluctantly gives permission, but after only a few moments on the dancing-floor, the music stops for the announcement of the message that Archduke Franz Ferdinand, heir presumptive to the throne of Austria-Hungary, and his wife Sophie have been assassinated at Sarajevo.
  In August, after the beginning of the war, the Grandauers receive a letter from Karl, reporting that he is alive and well, even though it is scary when the bullets fly around one's ears. When they go out afterwards for another visit at Agnes’ grave, they have a short talk with one of their neighbors, Mrs. Gschmeißner; just as they are about to proceed, she asks how they feel about Lichtl-Biwi's death on the very first day of combat, leaving Luise heart-broken about the news.
5. Heimkehr (‘Coming Home’)
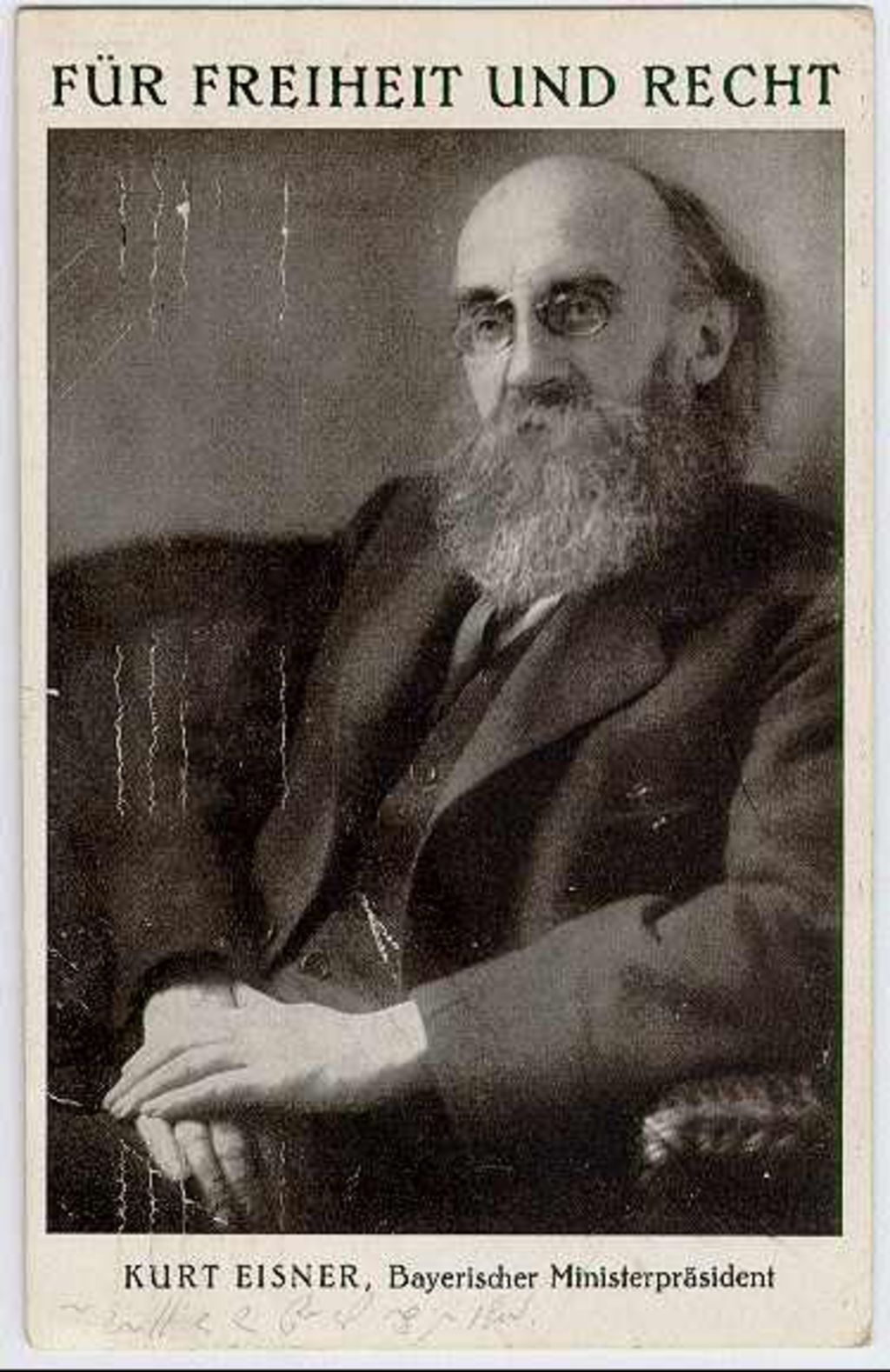
  Bavarian Minister-president Kurt Eisner in January 1919.
  December 1918: Germany has lost the First World War, food is running short, and the Spanish flu keeps killing large numbers of people. When Karl Grandauer comes back to Munich, he finds his family's old apartment inhabited by strangers; his father Ludwig has died from stomach ulcers, his brother Adolf has joined a free corps, and his sister Luise is married to baker Max Kreitmeier, who lost a leg in combat. The couple gives Karl a warm welcome, Max opens a bottle of wine, and they invite him to stay with them as long as necessary.
  The late Ludwig Grandauer's superior, Chief Inspector Rudolf Grüner, who is a regular customer of the Kreitmeiers’, offers Karl a job in the police force. Karl meets a young woman, who seems to be a saleslady in a music store, but turns out to be the owner's daughter; when her father tells him she is engaged, Karl stops wooing her.
  The tumults in Bavaria keep going on: Minister-president Kurt Eisner is assassinated on February 21, 1919; on April 6 the Bavarian Soviet Republic is proclaimed. A few weeks later, the police headquarters is seized by troops of the Bavarian Red Army, and the whole class of police cadets taught by Grüner is taken prisoner; they fear to be shot against the wall, but are set free when the Reds flee from the advancing free corps.
6. Konsequenzen (‘Conclusions’)
  October 1920: A dead woman is found at the side of a small road, with a sign labelling her a traitor to her fatherland. During investigation, Karl Grandauer comes across Traudl Soleder again, the woman he had met more than one and a half years earlier, for whose family the murdered woman had been working as a maid for a few weeks. The latter's boyfriend, a blind war veteran, tells the police that she had reported her former employer, Baron von Treuenthal, for illegally stashing weapons; a network of armed right-wing groups is revealed, among others comprising the Civil Guards and the National Socialists. Because of Sergeant Holzinger's rash proceeding, the main suspect of the actual murder in question is warned and can easily escape, with some aid by Wilhelm Frick, head of the political police, and by Ernst Pöhner, president of the Munich Police department, who repeatedly tried to curb the investigation. Chief Inspector Grüner, frustrated with his superiors’ corruption, considers quitting the service.
7. Polterabend (‘Wedding Eve’)
  May 1923: Traudl Soleder and Karl Grandauer are preparing for their wedding, but money keeps losing its value, and things like clothing are hard to come by. Karl runs into Metzger-Willy, an old acquaintance of his, who promises to provide him a Sunday suit and some good shoes. While Karl is at Willy's pompous apartment to fetch the shoes, the police come to the door, and Willy rushes out through the back entrance, taking Karl's coat with his police badge in its pocket; the police find a storage room with some stolen goods; Karl is temporarily arrested, but released in time for his wedding eve party at the Soleders’. Traudl's mother Adelgunde is upset by the manners and revealing dress of her son Kurt's girlfriend Sara, a Jewish woman from Berlin, and moans about the Jews’ alleged disrespect for her Catholic faith when she asks the priest for a dance.
  Meanwhile, the family's music store is failing, with Traudl's father August facing bankruptcy. During the party, he leaves the house and goes missing; he is eventually found dead in the water. The wedding is called off.
8. Umzüge (‘Movements’)
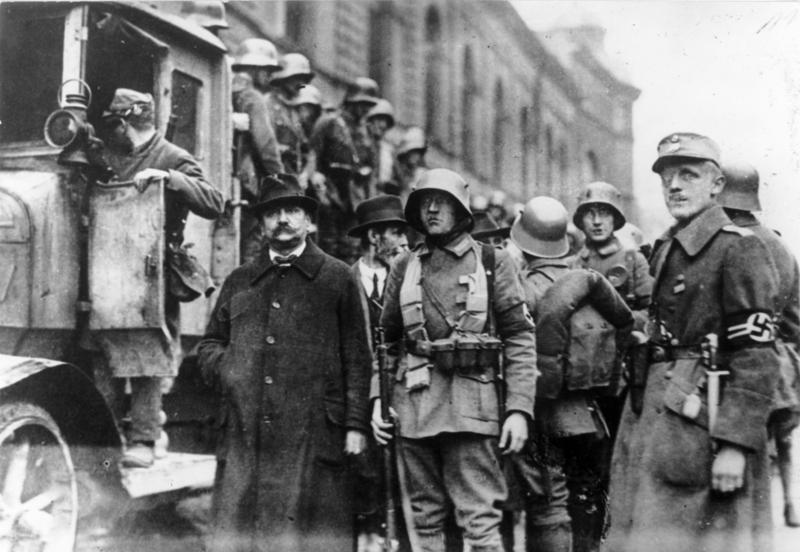
  Nazis arresting socialist city counsellors during the Beer Hall Putsch.
  November 9, 1923: The Soleders are moving out of their expensive apartment into police sergeant Karl Grandauer's new official residence, but streets are blocked due to the ongoing Beer Hall Putsch, that started the night before, and Karl is prevented from leaving the police headquarters for some time. When he is able to get out at last, knowing that the police is under order to shoot at the revolters, he is heading for the Feldherrnhalle to save his brother Adolf, an ardent Nazi and SA-member; he arrives just in time to get him out of the crowd as fire is opened. Karl gives Adolf his coat and hat to cover his SA-uniform and thus avoid immediate prosecution, and his sister Luise takes him in for a few days until the situation has calmed down. Later at night, Karl tells Luise about the ruthless actions of the revolters, illegally arresting opponents, and handing out death warrants.
9. Schlafzimmergeschichten (‘Bedroom Stories’)
  October 22, 1929: Kurt Soleder is working as a presenter at the Munich radio station, when one of his musicians is coming in late due to some sudden sickness; minutes later the man is dead. Police finds out that he died from cyanide poisoning after eating some of the marzipan potatoes he got from the girl with whom he had spent the night. When questioned by Chief Inspector Rudolf Grüner and Sergeant Karl Grandauer, she declares that she found the confections in her mail, with a note saying: “From a grateful customer.” The police then focus upon one of the lady's neighbors, a spinster who shows utter disgust about the young woman's many affairs, and who happens to regularly buy the same kind of marzipan potatoes that were found in the deceased man's pocket.
  Meanwhile, Traudl Grandauer, now a mother of two little sons, wants to replace their old and creaky double bed; but money is tight, and her husband Karl is too caught up in the murder investigation to go shopping. One day, Traudl takes the chance and sells their bedroom suite to an elderly couple to buy a new one without telling Karl, who is rather indignant over the surprise. Eventually Traudl's mother Adelgunde comes home, upset by the news she heard about the Wall Street Crash.
10. Notpolizei (‘Vigilante Police’)
  Autumn 1931: A young man distributing the communist newspaper Die Rote Fahne is beaten up and fatally injured by two vigilantes, who claim that they caught him while breaking a shop-window to steal a radio, and that they only used violence when the alleged burglar put up a fight while being arrested. Inspector Karl Grandauer is not convinced, but the suspects, both SA-members, receive protection from various persons; even Karl’s brother Adolf, working as an attorney at the state’s court, comes in to influence the course of the investigation. Meanwhile, people in the street are discussing Geli Raubal’s death in Hitler’s apartment at Munich. At home, Adelgunde Soleder, while preparing for going to an operetta, is confronted with her son Kurt’s having married his long-time girlfriend Sara, a Jewish woman from Berlin.
11. Kehraus (‘Clean-up’)
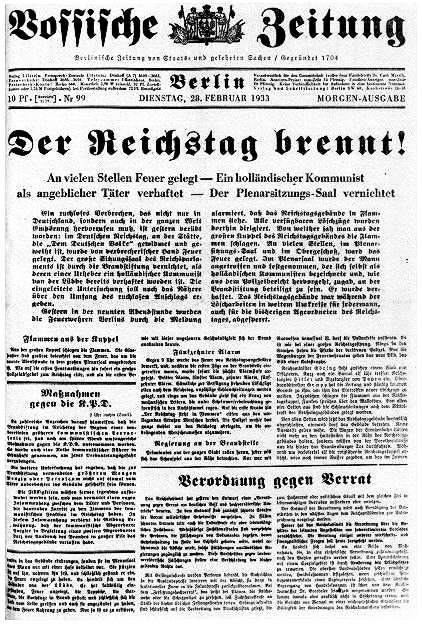
  Newspaper reporting the Reichstag fire.
  January 30, 1933: Adolf Hitler is appointed Chancellor of Germany by President Paul von Hindenburg. Chief Inspector Grüner is leaving to spend a few weeks in a health resort, and replaced for the time by Inspector Walter Deinlein, who fears to have irritated district attorney Adolf Grandauer by uttering a condescending comment about the new cabinet. Kurt and Sara Soleder come to visit Adelgunde on her name day, while Sara is heavily pregnant. Adolf Grandauer offers his sister Luise to convey substantial orders for the Nazi party to her husband's bakery, but advises them to get rid of their journeyman Toni, a leftist who has been caught up in street fights with the SA.
  February 28, 1933: Traudl Grandauer persuades her husband Karl to go to Kurt and Sara's Shrove Tuesday party; when they come back home in the early morning, they receive news that Grüner is in hospital after suffering a stroke. Meanwhile, the Dutch communist Marinus van der Lubbe is presented as the culprit for the Reichstag fire, and Hindenburg promptly issues the Decree for the Protection of People and State, massively curtailing people's personal freedoms, including the right to express one's opinion, freedom of the press, the right to organize and assemble, and the privacy of postal, telegraphic, and telephonic communications.
12. Volkswille (‘Will of the People’)
  March 1933: Two policemen come to the Kreitmeiers’ bakery with a search warrant for the room of their journeyman, confiscating brass knuckles and some communist propaganda posters. Inspector Karl Grandauer is called to a gravel pit, where a dead boy with a bullet in his head has been found. His father, a wealthy industrialist and member of the Nazi Party, has repeatedly been threatened by some of his workers, and immediately suspects his son has been killed by his political adversaries. Later, a mute swill dealer is arrested while carrying the gun the deadly shot was fired from. Mr. Hampel, Grandauer's former subordinate, who has just been transferred to the political police, gets a written confession out of the man, who previously claimed to have found the weapon on the ground. Eventually, one of the deceased boy's comrades from the Hitler Youth comes forward, admitting that he had taken his father's old army pistol to practice shooting in the gravel pit, where he accidentally killed his friend, leaving the gun behind.
  Meanwhile, troops of the SA and SS ravage the editorial office of the Münchener Post, the social democrats’ newspaper, abusing and arresting its staff. The Bavarian cabinet around minister-president Heinrich Held is replaced by Reichskommissar Franz Ritter von Epp; Heinrich Himmler is appointed president of the police, Reinhard Heydrich is made head of the political police. Constable Waldhauser is suspended from duty after making some taunting remarks against Hampel and the Nazis in general.
13. Frühlingsanfang (‘First Day of Spring’)
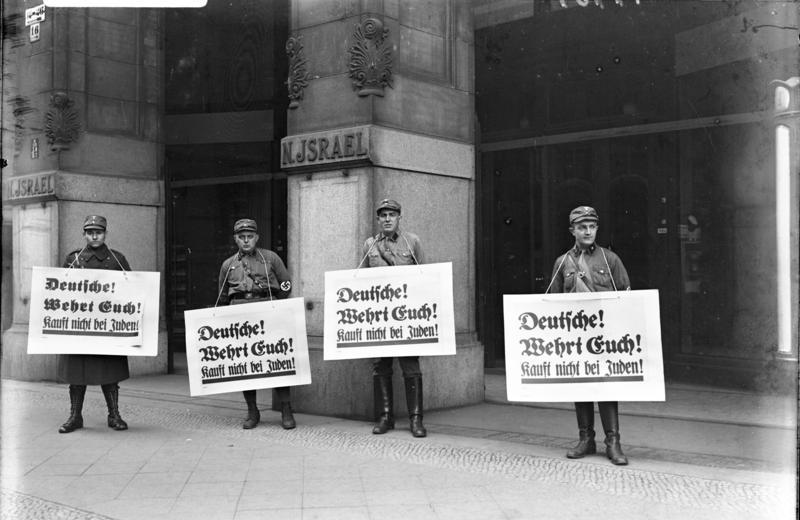
  Nazi SA paramilitaries outside Israel's Department Store in Berlin. The signs read: "Germans! Defend yourselves! Don't buy from Jews."
  March 21, 1933: An elderly Jewish man has killed himself by opening the gas-tap in his apartment, apparently in despair of the rampant antisemitic agitation in Germany; the Grandauers take care of his surviving dog. While many people are listening to President Hindenburg's and Chancellor Hitler’s speeches broadcast from the Day of Potsdam, Sara Soleder gives birth to a daughter.
  Baker Max Kreitmeier’s journeyman Toni, a staunch leftist, is imprisoned in the newly established Dachau concentration camp. Adolf Grandauer assures his brother Karl that the prisoners there are treated well; when they come to talk about Sara and Kurt’s child, he points out that Heinrich Himmler recently declared that “to him, any citizen of Jewish faith is as good a citizen as that of non-Jewish faith.”
  April 1933: The Soleders have decided to have their child baptized, but postpone the ceremony, worrying that Sara's Jewish parents would not leave their store as long as the Nazi boycott of Jewish businesses is lasting. The child's grandmother Adelgunde is upset by the delay; Adolf, not having been informed of the deferment, comes to visit the couple anyway, and ends up drinking too much. At the police canteen, Inspector Hampel publicly confronts Grandauer about his wife's insinuating to one of her neighbors that his sudden promotion is due to his political alignment rather than to his competence.

=== Season 2 (1991) ===
1. Bartholomäusnacht (‘St. Bartholomew’s Night’)
  June 30, 1934: News is coming in about the Night of the Long Knives. Chief Inspector Deinlein informs his staff that the president of the Munich Police Department, August Schneidhuber, has been executed by a firing squad; the summer party of the police planned for the evening is postponed by a few days. Kurt Soleder is reproved for playing Jazz and spoofing the regime's debasing rhetoric in his radio program; his Jewish wife Sara implores him to be more cautious, now being a father. Karl Grandauer is heading to Berlin to attend an advanced training course, but tries to pretend going to Leipzig, so he is not expected to visit Sara's parents.
  While Karl is absent, his wife Traudl goes to the party with retired Chief Inspector Grüner, but ends up dancing with her husband's young and attractive colleague Walter Toussaint. Meanwhile, a rumor is spreading about Toussaint's alleged homosexuality, swiftly ruining his career and reputation. Traudl and Toussaint have a meeting (without an intention of an affair on her part, but still in secret), where he bids her farewell stating he was "going on a long journey". Not much later he is run over by a tram, presumably having committed suicide.
2. Heimtücke (‘Treachery’)
  Autumn 1935: Sara Soleder is distraught after block warden Uhl confronts her with some tenants’ complaints about her little daughter Gerti allegedly soiling the sandbox; Uhl then advises her she should rather go to places where nobody knows she is Jewish whenever leaving her apartment. The same day she learns that her husband Kurt has been summoned to appear at the police station and arrested upon arrival, for unwarily remarking that German rearmament means war in front of an external functionary visiting the radio studio. He is sentenced to six months in prison under the Treachery Act of 1934 for causing distrust in the German government by a special court, allowing no appeal. The family tries to hide Kurt's legal trouble from the neighbors, and from his mother Adelgunde, who is devastated when she finally finds out. In Kurt's absence, his wife Sara receives a letter from their landlord, saying that their rental agreement will be terminated by the next date possible; Sara and Gerti are subsequently taken in by the Kreitmeiers.
  Meanwhile, Karl and Traudl Grandauer's son Rudi is becoming an avid member of the Hitler Youth; Adolf Grandauer announces to his brother Karl that his girlfriend is pregnant.
3. Tauwetter (‘Thawing’)
  February 1936: Due to the upcoming Winter Olympics at Garmisch-Partenkirchen, putting Germany into international focus, discrimination against Jews and other minorities is toned down a little; tags designating park benches as “only for Aryans” are removed. During the Games, even the policemen supposed to be working in their offices are spending much time listening to the radio, even though they are caught up in an extensive investigation on a possible serial killing. When Sara Soleder, now working in the Kreitmeiers’ shop, receives news that her mother has died, Traudl Grandauer goes along with her to attend the funeral in Berlin.
  March 7, 1936: Kurt is released from Stadelheim Prison, but finds himself permanently banned from working in broadcasting or any other kind of media; Max Kreitmeier offers him to work as his journeyman at the bakery. When they turn on the radio, a presenter is enthusiastically reporting on the German forces’ entering the Rhineland.
4. Veränderungen (‘Changes’)
  October 1936: Karl Grandauer is appointed deputy chief inspector. His colleague Inspector Schäfer is following a lead provided by an anonymous woman calling from a telephone booth, incriminating an SS-squad leader of having assaulted her. When this turns out to be a false accusation, Schäfer and Chief Inspector Deinlein are strongly dispraised by Gestapo-officer Hampel. Deinlein, who entered the Nazi Party to avoid drawbacks to his career, feels disgusted with his own cowardice for not defending his staff nor himself. The next day, Schäfer suffers a minor break-down, tossing around files in his bureau and loudly calling out the regime as a bunch of criminals.
  Max Kreitmeier is still devastated about his wife Luise's unexpected death in hospital after breaking her foot in spring. His distant cousin Kathi, who came to help him out with his baker's shop, is leaving for Max’ continuous hostile behaviour and his spending much time out drinking.
5. Gewalttäter (‘Violent Offender’)
  November 1938: Another woman has been attacked by a suspected serial killer, but the surviving victim can only remember the perpetrator's voice, and the investigation keeps stalling. One evening while walking home, Traudl and Adelgunde Soleder see a mob wrecking a Jew's store, turning away in horror. When Inspector Karl Grandauer comes across a similar incident with his car, he asks a bystanding constable why they are not intervening; as he is told that the matter is taken care of by higher authorities, Grandauer orders his driver to take him away from the scene.
6. Sommerfrische (‘Summer Holidays’)
7. Vorsehung (‘Destiny’)
8. Wehrkraftzersetzung (‘Demoralization of the Armed Forces’)
9. Fasanenjagd (‘Pheasant Shooting’)
10. Erbschaft (‘Inheritance’)
11. Abrechnung (‘Reckoning’)
12. Funkstille (‘Radio Silence’)
13. Kopfgeld (‘Bounty’)

=== Season 3 (1992) ===
1. Milchkaramellen (‘Fudge Cookies’)
2. Tigerbande (‘Tiger Gang’)
3. Mütter (‘Mothers’)
4. Barfrau (‘Barmaid’)
5. Unschuld (‘Innocence’)
6. Abschied (‘Farewell’)
