= Melanie Kogler =

Austrian television and theatre actress (born 1985)

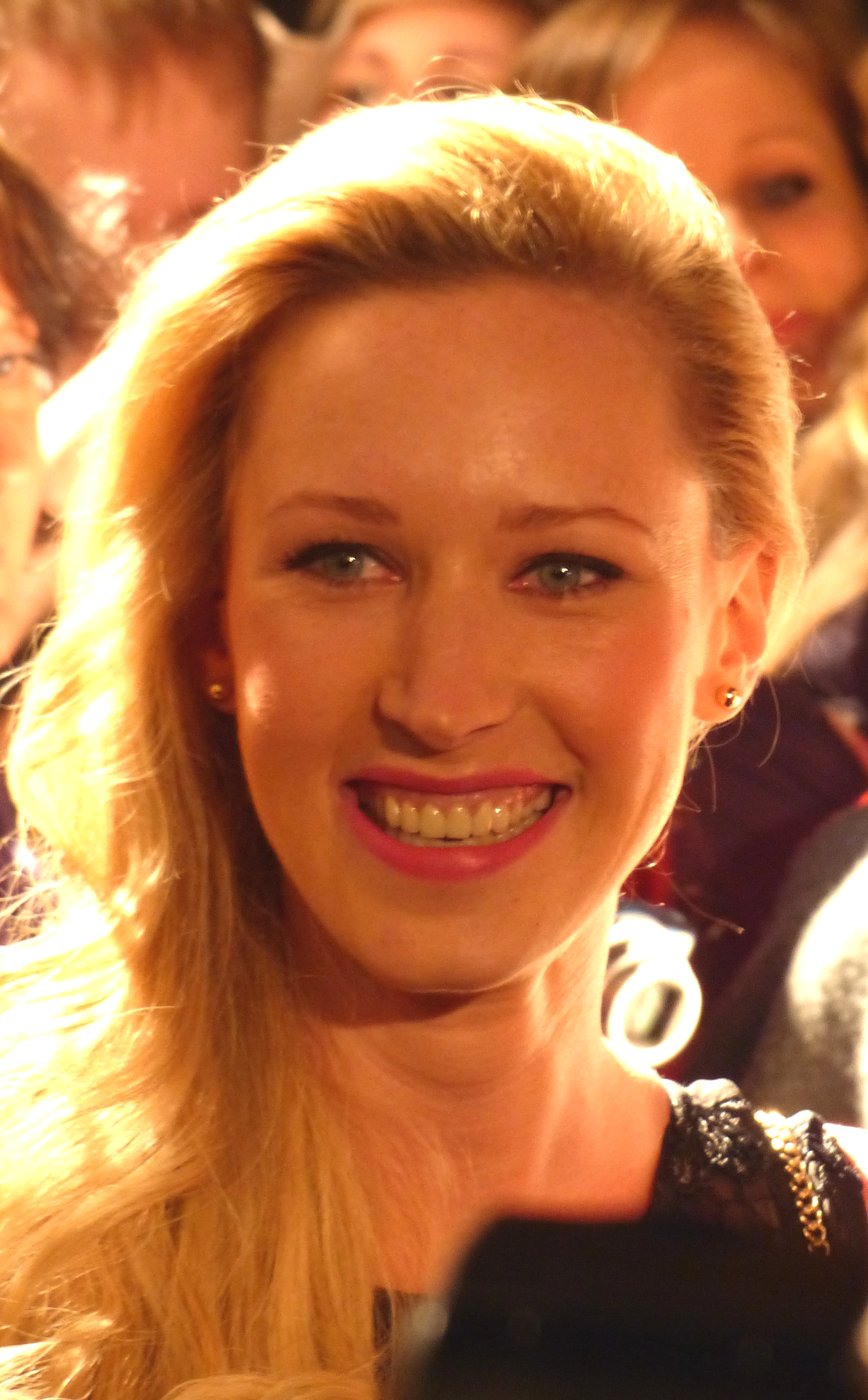

Melanie Isabella Kogler (born 18 April 1985 in Salzburg) is an Austrian television and theatre actress most known for her role as Marlene von Lahnstein (née Wolf) on the hit German television series, Verbotene Liebe (Forbidden Love).

== Professional career ==
Kogler attended the European Film Actor School in Zürich, Switzerland where she graduated in 2006. During her studies she performed in short films and plays. After graduation she performed with the Salzburg State Theatre in The Little Witch (Natascha Kalmbach) and Rembrandt B12 (Barbara Neureiter). In 2007 she starred in Markus Steinwender's staged version of Goethe's Faust as Gretchen.

Kogler made her television debut in 2007 on the ZDF crime show Die Rosenheim-Cops in the episode "A Deadly Taste", which was directed by Gunter Krää.

In der 2007-2008 theatre season Kogler resumed working on stage in at the Salzburg State Theatre. She performed in The Talisman (Emma) by Beverly Blankenship, and in The House of Bernarda Alba (young maid) directed by Frank Brightmouth. She also resumed her role in "The Little Witch" which was directed by Natasha Kalmbach.

=== Role on Verbotene Liebe (Forbidden Love) ===
In 2011 Kogler landed a role on the hit ARD show Verbotene Liebe. She debuted on 24 January 2011 as Marlene von Lahnstein, a character who would have several romantic encounters with members of the aristocratic Lahnstein family. Kogler gained international attention and praise for her performance when her character eventually fell in love with Countess Rebecca von Lahnstein (portrayed by Tatjana Kästel). Between 2012 - 2014 Kogler's character struggled with her sexual orientation whilst being engaged to a male member of the Lahnstein family, Count Tristan von Lahnstein (portrayed by Jens Hartwig), who is actually Rebecca's brother. Eventually, Marlene realizes that she cannot deny her love for Rebecca, despite her being a woman. Kogler was named one of AfterEllen's "Top 25 Lesbian/Bi Characters on TV (Right Now)" in 2013, along with her co-star Kästel. They were two of only three non-English speaking stars to be named on the list.

After two years in a starring role, Verbotene Liebe ended their contract with Kogler, and she left the show in September 2014.

== Filmography ==
- 2004: Und Action...
- 2004: Fräulein Julie
- 2004: Der Gesang im Feuerofen
- 2005: Heinrich & Henrietta
- 2005: Bei Banküberfällen wird mit wahrer Liebe gehandelt
- 2005: Molly Sweeney
- 2006: Der kaukasische Kreidekreis
- 2006: Die kleine Hexe
- 2007: Rembrandt B12
- 2007: Faust 1
- 2007: Der Talisman
- 2007: Die Rosenheim-Cops – Ein mörderischer Geschmack
- 2007: Bernarda Albas Haus
- 2008: Komödienstadel – G'suacht und G'fundn
- 2008: Steht auf wenn ihr für Salzburg seid
- 2008: Eine Mittsommernachts-Sex-Komödie
- 2008: Der Sturm
- 2008: Komödienstadel – Der letzte Bär von Bayern
- 2009: Second Life
- 2009: Komödienstadel – Endstation Drachenloch
- 2009: Spielwiese
- 2009: Weihnachten bei Tiger und Bär
- 2010: Kasimir und Karoline
- 2010: Ja (short film)
- 2010: Rechtschreibung (short film)
- 2010: YouDie (short film)
- 2010: Impure Intent
- 2011–2014: Verbotene Liebe
- 2014: Wilsberg – Die Übergabe
