= Martha Kunig-Rinach =

German opera singer

- Kunig-Rinach circa 1957
- Born: Martha Rinach; 1 April 1898; Munich, Germany
- Died: 24 March 1993 (aged 94); Munich, Germany
- Occupations: Operetta singer (mezzo-soprano); Actress

Martha Kunig-Rinach, née Martha Rinach (1 April 1898 – 24 March 1993) was a German actress and operetta singer (mezzo-soprano).

== Life and career ==
Born in Munich, Kunich-Rinach made her debut at the age of 17 at the Munich Residenz Theatre. From 1938 to 1944 she was engaged at the Münchner Volkstheater. Two years later she came to the Staatstheater am Gärtnerplatz, to which she belonged for many years as a permanent member of the ensemble. Kunig-Rinach, who in the end only achieved regional fame, also played small character roles in several German movies such as: Das seltsame Leben des Herrn Bruggs (1936), Der weißblaue Löwe (1952), Ein Herz schlägt für dich (1949), Die Alm an der Grenze (1951), Begegnung mit Werther (1949), Das kann jedem passieren (1952), and Das schreckliche Mädchen (1990). She also appeared on radio, including 15 episodes (from 1969 to 1985) of the Bayerischer Rundfunk program Das Bairisch Herz, Heiteres und Besinnliches in Worten und Liedern. In 1962 she played a leading role in "Das Dienstjubiläum" in Der Komödienstadel alongside Michl Lang, Erni Singerl, Maxl Graf and others. From the 1950s, she also worked as a dubbing artist.

Kunich-Rinach retired from the stage in 1982. She died in the city of her birth at the age of 94 and is buried in the Ostfriedhof cemetery. She was married to the tenor and actor Rudolf Kunig (1894–1951).
