= Gerd Anthoff =

German actor

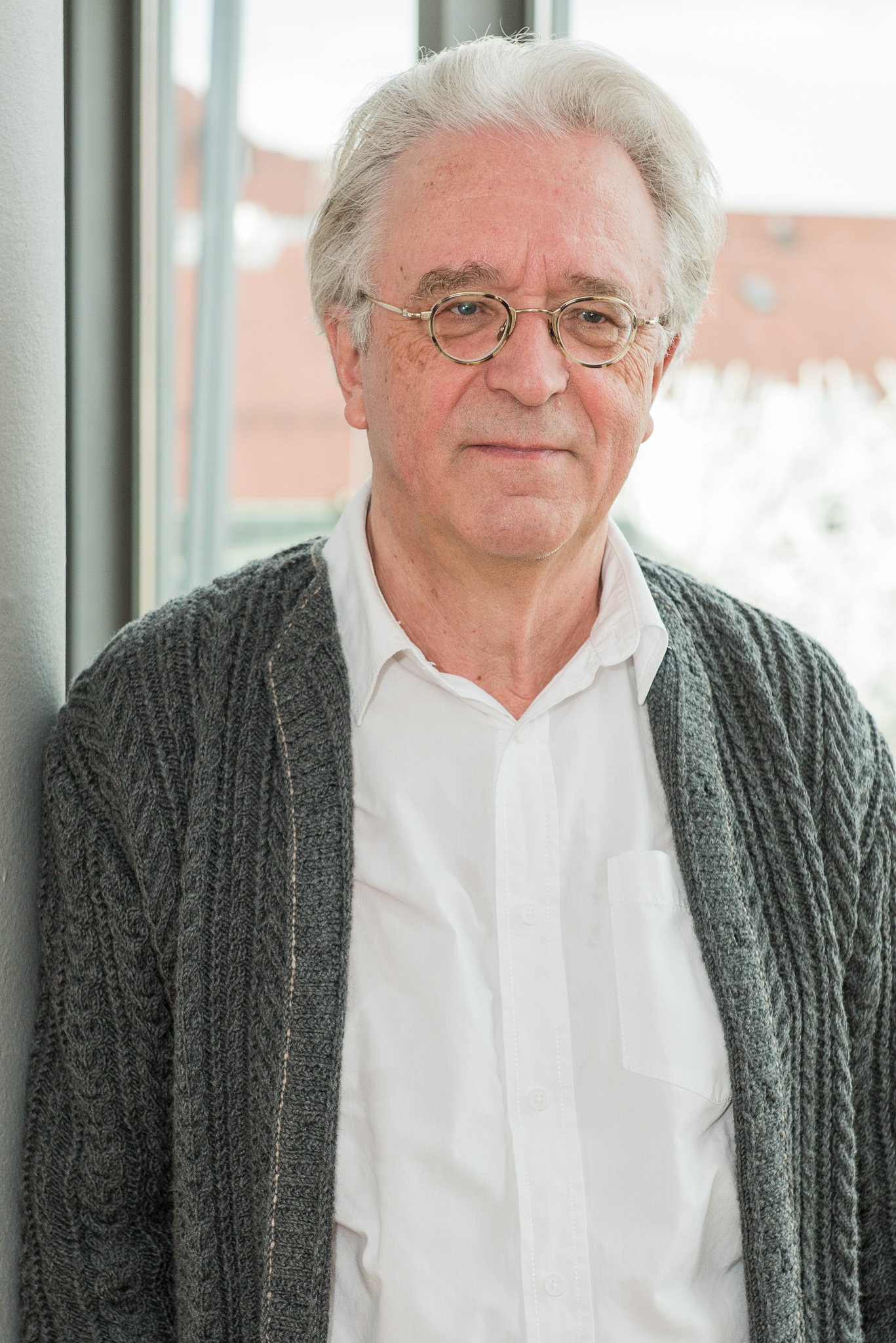
Gerd Anthoff (2015)

Gerd Anthoff (born August 12, 1946 in Munich) is a German theatre and television actor.

== Biography ==
Gerd Anthoff started his acting career in 1967 and became a permanent member of the ensemble at the Bavarian State Theatre in 1970, where among other roles he played Nantwein in the play Der Brandner Kasper for 27 years. He also took part in many TV films and series.

== Films and Series ==
- 1970: Die seltsamen Methoden des Franz Josef Wanninger (1 episode)
- 1981: In der Sache J. Robert Oppenheimer (filmed theatre performance)
- 1986: Weißblaue Geschichten (2 episodes)
- 1987: Professor Bernhardi (filmed theatre performance)
- 1987–2004: The Old Fox (6 episodes)
- 1988: Zur Freiheit (2 episodes)
- 1988–1995: Derrick (5 episodes)
- 1989: Joseph Filser – Bilder aus dem Leben eines Bayerischen Abgeordneten
- 1990–1992: Löwengrube – Die Grandauers und ihre Zeit (22 episodes)
- 1992: Die Hausmeisterin (5 episodes)
- 1992–2003: SOKO 5113 (5 episodes)
- 1993–1994: Wildbach (2 episodes)
- 1995, 1999: Café Meineid (2 episodes)
- 1996: Tatort (1 episode)
- 1996–2009: Der Bulle von Tölz (18 episodes)
- 1999, 2001: Siska (2 episodes)
- 2002–2019: Unter Verdacht
- 2004: SOKO Kitzbühel (1 episode)
- 2004: München 7 (1 episode)
- 2004–2006: Zwei am großen See
- 2008: Die Rosenheim-Cops (1 episode)
- 2008–2009: Der Kaiser von Schexing (24 episodes)
- 2010: The Holy Land of Tyrol
- 2012: Das Traumschiff (1 episode)
- 2013: Im Schleudergang (6 episodes)
- 2019–2020: Reiterhof Wildenstein

== Awards ==
- 1995: Bayerischer Fernsehpreis
- 2003: Adolf-Grimme-Preis
- 2010: Bavarian Order of Merit
- 2011: Gold medal München leuchtet for his achievements as a Bavarian Actor
- 2013: Pro meritis scientiae et litterarum

== Sources ==
- Internet movie data base.
- Biography at kino.de.
- Gerd Anthoff, der scheue Atheist, in: Süddeutsche Zeitung, December 21, 2016.
