= Alexandra Schiffer =

German actress and art historian

- Born: 1982 (age 42–43); Munich, West Germany
- Occupation(s): Actress, art historian
- Spouse: Thomas Christl
- Children: 3
- Parent(s): Michaela May; Jack Schiffer

Alexandra Schiffer, married name Alexandra Christl (born 1982) is a German actress and art historian.

== Life and career ==
Schiffer is the daughter of Michaela May and Jack Schiffer and older sister of Lilian Schiffer. She studied art history in London. She is married to the investment banker Thomas Christl, has three children and works for Sotheby’s in London as a specialist in impressionism and modern art.

== Filmography ==
- 1993: Zwei Halbe sind noch lange kein Ganzes
- 1994: Unsere Schule ist die Beste
- 1995: Hallo, Onkel Doc!
- 1996: Der Bulle von Tölz: Tod am Altar
- 1996: Männer sind was Wunderbares
- 1998: Der Bergdoktor
- 1998: Hallo, Onkel Doc!
- 1998: Ärzte
- 1998: Papa, ich hol’ dich raus
- 1999: Unser Lehrer Doktor Specht
- 1999: Am Anfang war der Seitensprung
- 2001/2002: Der blaue Vogel
- 2003/2006: SOKO München
- 2007: Der Komödienstadel: Alles fest im Griff
- 2010: Eine Sennerin zum Verlieben
