= Tatjana Kästel =

German actress (born 1982)

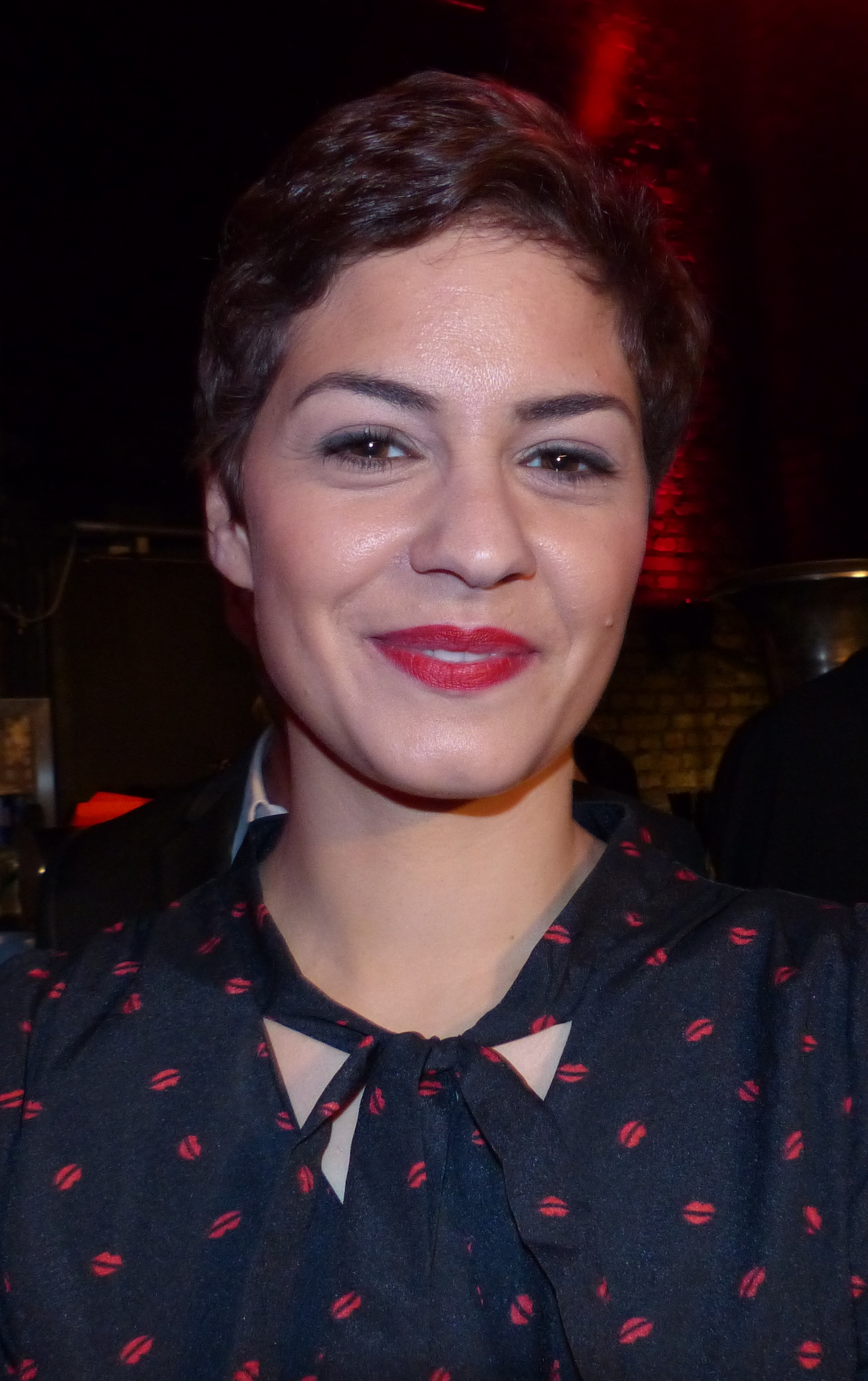
Tatjana Kästel in 2013

Tatjana Kästel (born 20 March 1982 in Karlsruhe) is a German actress who currently plays Rebecca von Lahnstein on the hit German show Verbotene Liebe (Forbidden Love).

== Professional career ==
Kästel studied at the University Mozarteum in Salzburg, Austria between 2000 and 2004. She was awarded the "Class Actors Sat.1 Talent Award for Best Actress."

Between 2004 and 2010 Kästel worked at the Staatstheater Mainz. She has also performed in other films and miniseries.

=== Role on Verbotene Liebe (Forbidden Love) ===
In 2012 she landed the role of Countess Rebecca von Lahnstein on the hit series Verbotene Liebe, where she is still currently working. Kästel gained international attention and praise for her performance when her character eventually fell in love with Marlene von Lahnstein (portrayed by Melanie Kogler). Between 2012 and 2014 Kästel's character struggled with her feelings with Marlene, who at the time was in a relationship with her brother, Count Tristan von Lahnstein (portrayed by Jens Hartwig). Ultimately, Kästel's character falls in love and has a romantic relationship with Marlene, which received an international following. Kästel was named one of AfterEllen's "Top 25 Lesbian/Bi Characters on TV (Right Now)" in 2013, along with her co-star Kogler. They were two of only three non-English speaking stars to be named on the list. Despite the couple's end in mid-2014 and Kogler's release from the show, Kästel continues to act in a starring role.

== Filmography ==
- 2003: Medicopter 117 – Jedes Leben zählt
- 2004: Vier im Flur (Short film)
- 2004: Mit Herz und Handschellen
- 2004: SK Kölsch
- 2005: Loslassen (Short film)
- 2010: Ein Fall für zwei
- 2011: Idiotentest
- 2011: Wohnen auf Bewährung (Short film)
- seit 2011: Verbotene Liebe
- 2012: Der letzte Bulle

== Awards ==
- 2004: Sat.1 Talent Award (actor category), best female actress
