= Dora Altmann =

German actress

- Born: Dora Tremmel; 6 February 1881; Munich, Kingdom of Bavaria, German Empire
- Died: 24 December 1971 (aged 90); Munich, West Germany
- Occupation: Actress
- Years active: 1908–1971
- Height: 5 ft 1 in (1.55 m)

Dora Altmann (born Dora Tremmel, 6 February 1881 – 24 December 1971) was a German actress, she performed as a singer and in theatre, but was noted for her decade-long career in later life, from the age of 80, starting in 1961, appearing in television series and having a small uncredited appearance in the film Willy Wonka and the Chocolate Factory.

== Biography ==
Altmann was born, as Dora Tremmel, on 6 February 1886 to Munich magistrate Theodor Tremmel. She graduated from the Riemerschmid Commercial School and initially pursued a civil profession.

In 1908, without the knowledge of her parents, she joined the Paul Kister folk singer society, which played in the Gärtnerbräu on Reichenbachstrasse. In 1915 she went on tour with her husband Richard Altmann and his music quartet Buntes Münchner Brettl.

In 1947 she was brought to the Platzl by Michl Lang, where she gave the nasty old woman for 24 years until her death. Here she also helped Bally Prell in October 1953 before her premiere as the Beauty Queen of Schneizlreuth with a ribbon from her bodice to fasten the crown on the debutante's head.

She made her television debut at the age of 80 in 1961 as Veronika in Die drei Eisbären. In 1971 she was cast in the uncredited role of Grandma Georgina in Willy Wonka & the Chocolate Factory. Her last television role was as Ms. Windegger in the Tatort episode "Wenn Steine sprechen," broadcast in 1972.

In February 1971, she celebrated her birthday with friends from Platzl and died on Christmas Eve, 1971 aged 85 and was buried in a cemetery in Munich East with her husband Richard Altmann. Bally Prell sang at the memorial service.

== Selected filmography ==
Year	Title	Role	Notes
1961	Der Komödienstadel - Die drei Eisbären	Die Alte, Veronika	German TV
1961	Funkstreife Isar 12	Oma	German TV
1963	Als ich noch der Waldbauernbub war		German TV
1964	Die fünfte Kolonne		German TV
1965	Der Ruepp		German TV
1965	Die seltsamen Methoden des Franz Josef Wanninger		German TV
1966	Der Komödienstadel	Die alte Sterzerin	German TV
1966	Endkampf	Oma	German TV
1967	Das Kriminalmuseum - Teerosen		German TV
1968	Der Holledauer Schimmel	Die alte Walperin	German TV
1969	Der Komödienstadel - Das Wunder des heiligen Florian	Die alte Lechnerin	German TV
1971	Mathias Kneissl		
1971	Königlich Bayerisches Amtsgericht - Der Wilderer und das Gespenst		German TV
1971	Willy Wonka & the Chocolate Factory	Grandma Georgina	
1972	Tatort - Wenn Steine sprechen		German TV
1972	Alpha Alpha		German TV
