= Erich Hallhuber =

Bavarian actor (1951–2003)

Erich Hallhuber

Erich Hallhuber (July 14, 1951 – September 17, 2003) was a Bavarian actor. He was born in Munich and worked in theatre, opera, television and film.

== Background ==
Erich Huber Hallhuber was born in Munich, Germany. His father was an opera singer and actor as well.

== Death ==
Hallhuber died from epileptic seizure in his Munich apartment in 2003.

== Works ==
His works include:

- Rossini
- Der Stellvertreter
- Café Meineid
- Löwengrube – Die Grandauers und ihre Zeit
- Kriminaltango

== Selected filmography ==
- 1976: Munich (TV Movie) - Franz von Riggauer
- 1983-1985: Polizeiinspektion 1 (TV Series) - Stefan Keller / Heinz Plötzl, Polizeihauptwachtmeister
- 1983-1993: Derrick (TV Series) - Viktor Lange / Roland Scholler / Dr. Römer
- 1983-2003: The Old Fox (TV Series) - Max Brauer / Bertram Zabelsdorf / Martin Bernried / Peter Hubmann / Wolfgang Aust
- 1985-2000: Tatort (TV Series) - Hans Riedl / Bruno Richert
- 1987-1988: Captain James Cook (TV Mini Series) - Lt. John Gore
- 1988: How much of human love needs (TV Movie) - Rolf
- 1989: Boomerang Boomerang - Seiters
- 1989: Ein Fall für zwei (TV Series) - Felix Hartwig
- 1989: Frederick Forsyth Presents: Just Another Secret (TV Movie) - Dieter Oberg
- 1989: Double Play (TV Movie) - Dr. Konrad Thoss
- 1990: La belle Anglaise (TV Series) - Struhler
- 1990-2003: Café Meineid (TV Series) - Richter Heinz Wunder
- 1991-1992: Lion's Den (TV Series)
- 1991-1994: Anwalt Abel (TV Series) - Dr. Unselt
- 1991: Eine erste Liebe
- 1992: Regina auf den Stufen (TV Series) - Paul Oldenhoff
- 1993: The Great Bellheim (TV Mini Series) - Alex Barnes
- 1993: Der Millionenerbe (TV Series) - Karl Lüderitz
- 1993: Happy Holiday (TV Series) - Martin
- 1993: Die Männer vom K3 (TV Series) - Alfons Moosbacher
- 1994-1995: Immenhof (TV Series) - Stefan Christiansen
- 1995: Escape to Paradise (TV Mini Series) - Hanno Hellmann
- 1997: Rossini - Bankier Rudi Hopf
- 1997-1998: On the Nockherberg (TV Series) - Bruder Barnabas
- 1997-2000: Der Bulle von Tölz (TV Series) - Dr. Raimund Vogler / Mann bei Auktion
- 1998-2001: SOKO 5113 (TV Series) - Ralf von Waldow / Gerd Trautmann
- 1998-2003: Das Traumschiff (TV Series) - Rüdiger Kluge / Peter Böhmert
- 1999: The Sternbergs (TV Series) - Fabian Sternberg
- 2000: Die Verbrechen des Professor Capellari (TV Series) - Wolfgang Kruse
- 2000: Siska (TV Series) - Lothar Hinze
- 2001: A love in Majorca (TV Movie) - Paul Blesing
- 2001: Dance with the Devil (TV Movie) - Schumann
- 2002: Amen. - Von Rutta
- 2002: Wilsberg (TV Series) - Pfarrer Hollein
- 2003: In the name of the Lord (TV Movie) - Pater Albert
- 2004: Heiter bis tödlich: München 7 (TV Series) - Oberamtsrat Rudolf Kalisch
