= Horst Kummeth =

German television actor, writer and director

Horst Kummeth (born 27 December 1956 in Forchheim, West Germany) is a German television actor, writer and director.

== Selected filmography ==
- Derrick - Season 11, Episode 02: "Die Verführung" (1984)
