= Michaela May =

German film and television actress (born 1952)

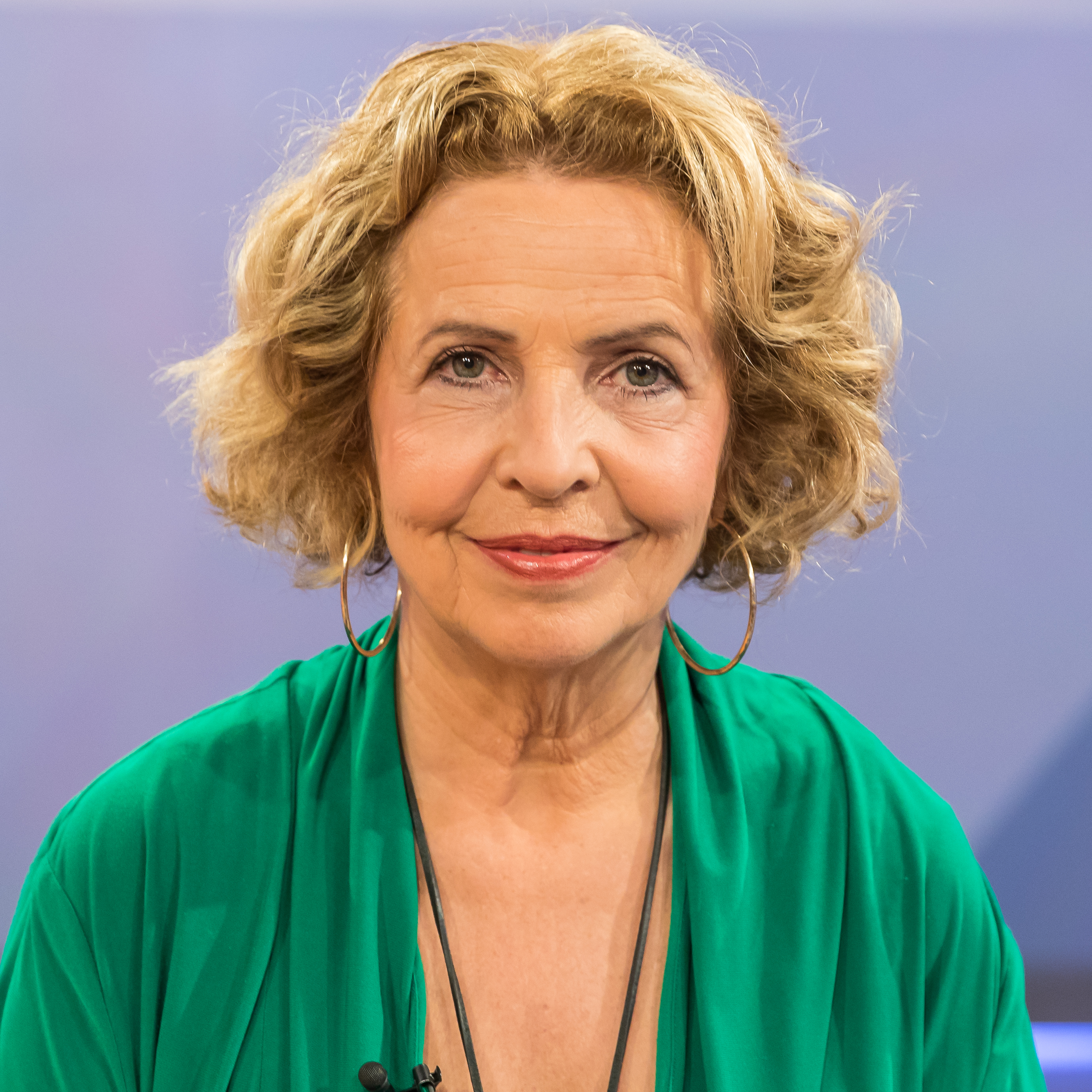
- Michaela May in 2019
- Born: Gertraud Elisabeth Berta Franziska Mittermayr; 18 March 1952 (age 74); Munich, Bavaria, West Germany
- Other name: Gertraud Mittermayr
- Occupation: Actress
- Years active: 1965– (film)
- Spouses: Jack Schiffer (m. 1980; div. 2004) Bernd Schadewald (m. 2006)
- Children: Alexandra Schiffer; Lilian Schiffer

Michaela May (born Gertraud Elisabeth Berta Franziska Mittermayr; 18 March 1952) is a German film and television actress.

== Life and career ==
May, who was born and raised in Munich, took ballet lessons from the age of seven, and as a ten-year-old she was on stage in a children's ballet. As Gertraud Mittermayr, she had her screen debut in 1965 in Uncle Tom's Cabin under Géza von Radványi. After graduating from high school, she completed an apprenticeship as a kindergarten teacher and also attended an acting school. In 1967 she appeared in a television series as a dancer. On the advice of her agency, she has appeared under the stage name Michaela May since the film Flucht ohne Weg (1967). "Michaela" is a given name of her choice that she liked, and "May" is part of her real name.

She then worked as an actress at the theater. In 1970 she made her stage debut at the Komödie am Kurfürstendamm in Berlin, and in 1972, she appeared there in Sauvajon's play A Handful of Nettles. In Munich, she played in the psychological thriller Gaslicht in the comedy in the Bayerischer Hof. With the successful television series Munich Stories (1974), she established herself as a busy serial actress. She also became known through the Eurocheque card advertising that came up around 1975, in which her name could be found on oversized check cards in all post and bank branches.

In 1980, May married the lawyer Jack Schiffer, with whom she has two daughters — Alexandra (* 1982) and Lilian Schiffer (* 1988), both in whom are also actresses. In 2006, May married her second husband, the director Bernd Schadewald. She lives in Munich.

== Other work ==
May has been a guardian angel and ambassador for cystic fibrosis patients since 1990. In 2014, she became an honorary member of the patient organization Mukoviszidose e. V. On her homepage, she calls for sponsorships and donations for the SOS Children's Villages at readings and events. The actress has supported Welthungerhilfe for several years and has visited aid organization projects in India in 2010 and Madagascar in 2016. Since 2019, May, together with her actor colleague Elmar Wepper, has been the patron of the non-profit organization Retla e.V., which is active in helping the elderly. There, she is involved in the "Telephone Angel" campaign against the loneliness of older people in the Corona crisis.

== Selected filmography ==
- Uncle Tom's Cabin (1965)
- Heidi (1965)
- Der Tod läuft hinterher (1967, TV miniseries)
- Dead Body on Broadway (1969)
- How Would You Like to Have It? (1983)
- Lovers (1995, TV film)
- Das merkwürdige Verhalten geschlechtsreifer Großstädter zur Paarungszeit (1998)
- Hochzeit zu viert (2001, TV film)
- Unterwegs mit Elsa (2013)
- Family Party (2015)

== Bibliography ==
- Goble, Alan (1999). The complete index to literary sources in film. London: Bowker-Saur. ISBN 978-3-11-095194-3. OCLC 868959494.
