= Franziska Stömmer =

Franziska Stömmer (16 September 1922 – 21 June 2004) was a German folk and character actress.

== Life ==
Stömmer was born on 16 September 1922 in Eichendorf, Bavaria.

After studying at Otto Falckenberg's acting school, Stömmer was seen on stages in Reichenberg and Munich in the 1940s, but interrupted her career at the request of her husband Wolfgang Eichberger (1911–1963). It was not until the end of the 1950s that she returned as an actress and appeared in several films, television series (including Königlich Bayerisches Amtsgericht, Meister Eder und sein Pumuckl and Die zweite Heimat – Chronik einer Jugend) and radio plays. She became more widely known as Grandma Soleder, first in the radio series Die Grandauers und ihre Zeit alongside Karl Obermayr and Ilse Neubauer and then nationwide in the television series Löwengrube (1989 to 1992), where she acted alongside Jörg Hube and Christine Neubauer.

At the end of the 1990s, the penniless actress moved into a retirement home in Munich, where she died in 2004. She was buried in the Solln Forest Cemetery in Munich.

== Filmography ==
=== Cinema ===
- 1965: Aunt Frieda
- 1976: Kings of the Road
- 1979: Bloodline

=== Television (selection) ===
- 1959: Kasimir und Karoline
- 1964: Die Verbrecher
- 1965: Die Reise nach Steiermark (TV movie)
- 1966: Stahlnetz: Der fünfte Mann (TV series episode)
- 1967: Report of a Coward (TV movie)
- 1971: Strange Stories: Conjuring at Midnight
- 1971: Eyewitnesses Must Be Blind (TV movie)
- 1972: Adele Spitzeder (TV movie)
- 1972–1987: Tatort (TV series)
  - 1972: Münchner Kindl
  - 1973: Weißblaue Turnschuhe
  - 1976: Wohnheim Westendstraße
  - 1987: Pension Tosca oder Die Sterne lügen nicht
- 1973: Der Komödienstadel: The Three Village Saints
- 1975: Der Wohltäter
- 1975–1976: Spannagl & Sohn (TV series, 8 episodes)
- 1976: Inspection Lauenstadt: Der Kompagnon (television series)
- 1978: Derrick: Ein Hinterhalt (TV series episode)
- 1978: Polizeiinspektion 1: Die Referendarinnen (TV series episode)
- 1979: Andreas Vöst
- 1980: Glaube Liebe Hoffnung
- 1982: The Old Fox: Ich werde dich töten (TV series episode)
- 1982: Meister Eder und sein Pumuckl (TV series, 2 episodes)
- 1984: Derrick: Manuels Pflegerin (TV series episode)
- 1985: Hochzeit (TV movie, director: Kurt Wilhelm)
- 1987: Hans im Glück (2 episodes)
- 1988: Lindenstraße (television series, 2 episodes)
- 1988–1992: Die zweite Heimat – Chronik einer Jugend (episodes 3, 4, 8, 9 and 10)
- 1989–1992: Löwengrube – Die Grandauers und ihre Zeit (television series, 27 episodes)
- 1993: Madame Bäurin
- 1997: Mali (BR two-parter, director: Rainer Wolffhardt)
- 1997: Herbert und Schnipsi (Herbert's mother)
- 1998: Der Bulle von Tölz: Mord im Irrenhaus (TV series episode)
