= Café Meineid =

German television series

- Genre: Comedy
- Created by: Franz Xaver Bogner
- Country of origin: Germany
- No. of episodes: 147

Production
- Running time: 22 minutes

Original release
- Release: 1989 – 2002

Café Meineid (Café Perjury) is a German courtroom comedy television series based on actual cases. The series aired 147 episodes from 1990 to 2003 and ended with the death of lead actor Erich Hallhuber.
