= Anton Feichtner =

German television actor

Anton Feichtner (born 1942 in Garching an der Alz, Germany) is a German television actor.

== Selected filmography ==
- Derrick - Season 6, Episode 12: "Ein Todesengel" (1979)
- Derrick - Season 7, Episode 5: "Ein tödlicher Preis" (1980)
- Derrick - Season 7, Episode 11: "Pricker" (1980)
- Derrick - Season 9, Episode 7: "Hausmusik" (1982)
- Derrick - Season 11, Episode 8: "Ein Mörder zu wenig" (1984)
