= Maria Peschek =

German comedian, actress and playwright (1953–2023)

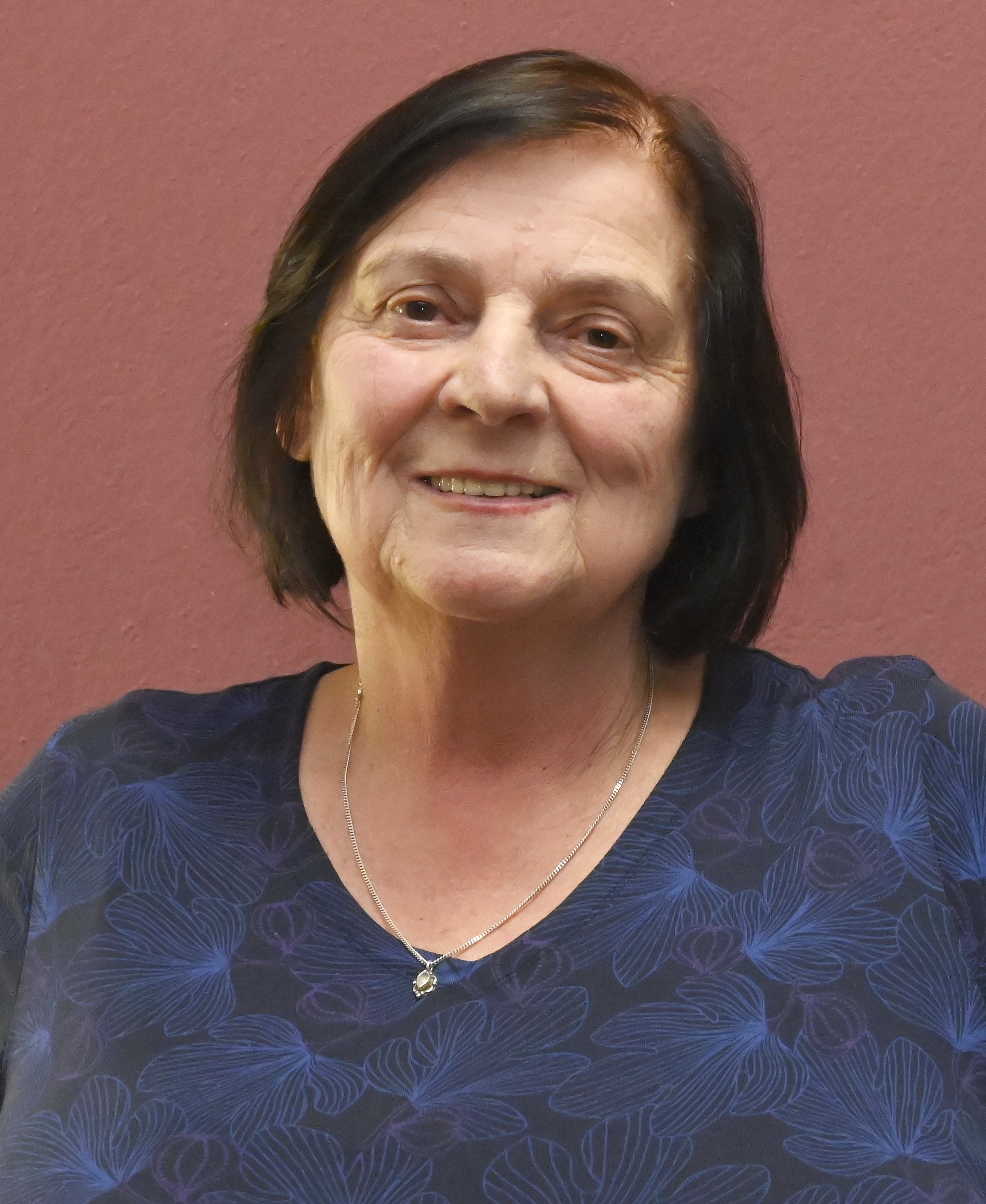
- Peschek in 2019
- Born: 12 August 1953; Weng, Landshut, Bavaria, West Germany
- Died: 8 June 2023 (aged 69)

Maria Peschek (12 August 1953 – 8 June 2023) was a German comedian, actress and playwright.

== Life and career ==
Born in Weng, Bavaria, Peschek grew up in Munich, and graduated in acting from the Otto Falckenberg School of the Performing Arts. After several character roles on stage and on TV series, she had her breakout in 1985, when she ranked second in the Scharfrichterbeil cabaret contest playing the Ratschkathl character Paula Pirschl. Since then she successfully played the character in cabaret, radio and television shows, notably becoming a regular in the Bayerischer Rundfunk show Radiospitzen. On stage, she was mainly associated with the Tams Theatre in Munich, for which she often served as a playwright and an actress. In 2003, she formed the comedy duo "Beppi and Charli" with actress Annette Spola.

During her career Peschek was the recipient of numerous awards and honors, notably a Schwabing Art Prize, a Bayerischer Poetentaler, a Dieter Hildebrandt Prize and an Ernst-Hoferichter-Preis. She died of heart attack on 8 June 2023, at the age of 69.
